= Outline of eugenics =

Overview of and topical guide to eugenics

Outline of Eugenics
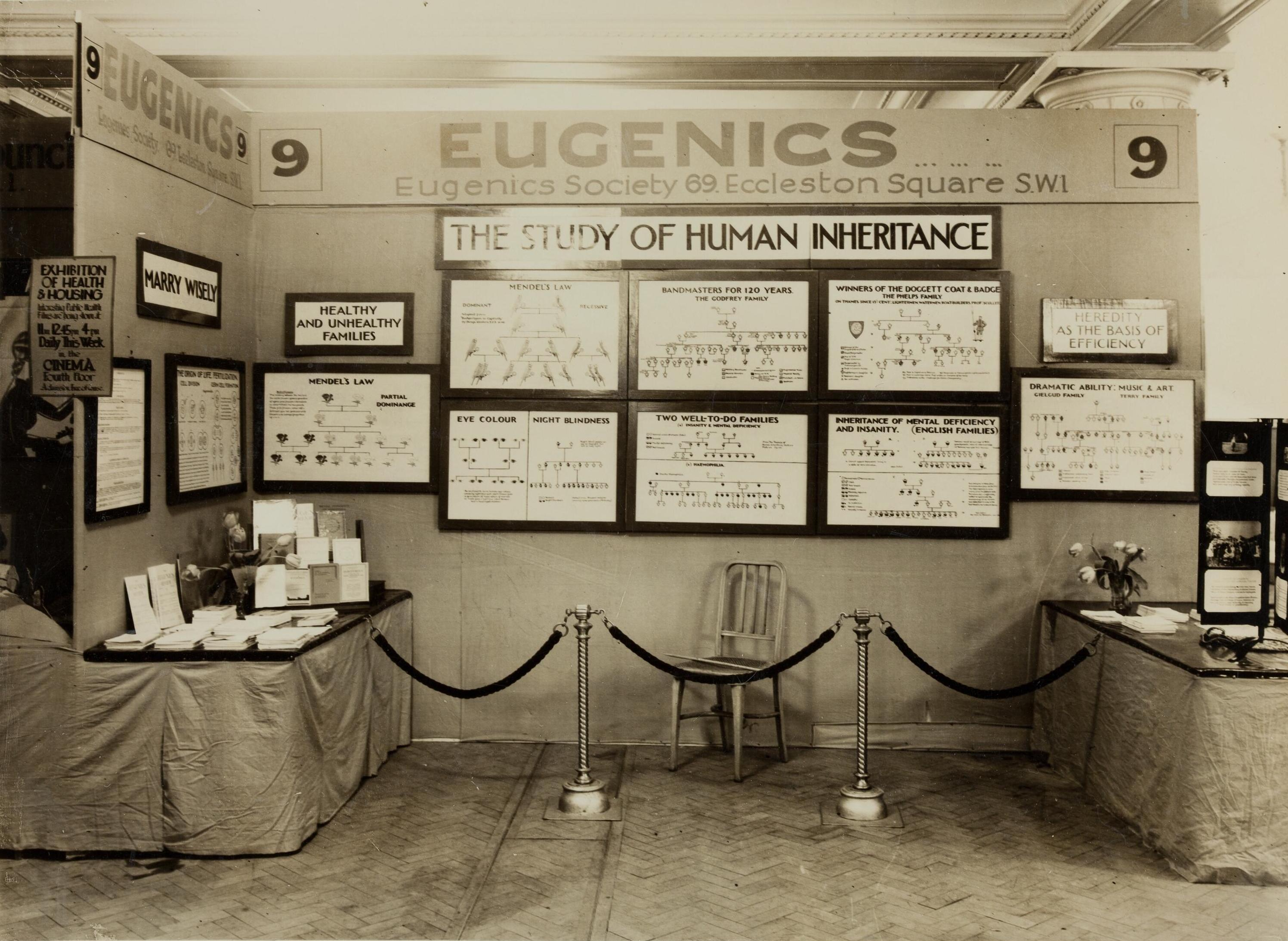
- 1930s exhibit by the Eugenics Society
- Term coined: 1883
- Status: Largely discredited
- Methods: Compulsory sterilization, Euthanasia
- Programs: Aktion T4; Lebensborn; Kinder der Landstrasse
- Related ideologies: Racial hygiene Scientific racism Social Darwinism
- Organizations: Eugenics Record Office; American Eugenics Society; Adelphi Genetics Forum; Kaiser Wilhelm Institute of Anthropology, Human Heredity, and Eugenics
- References: Bibliography of eugenics Bibliography of the history of eugenics Glossary of eugenics Timeline of Eugenics

The following outline is provided as an overview of and topical guide to eugenics.

Eugenics (Note: /juːˈdʒɛnɪks/ yoo-JEN-iks; from Ancient Greek εύ̃ (eû) 'good, well' and -γενής (genḗs) 'born, come into being, growing/grown') is a largely discredited set of beliefs and practices that aim to improve the genetic quality of a human population. Historically, eugenicists have attempted to alter the frequency of various human phenotypes by inhibiting the fertility of those considered inferior, often through forced sterilization, or promoting that of those considered superior.

== Main articles ==
- Eugenics
- History of eugenics
- Compulsory sterilization
- Nazi eugenics
- Eugenics in the United States
- Scientific racism
- Social Darwinism

== Reference and navigation ==
- Glossary of eugenics
- Timeline of eugenics
- Bibliography of eugenics
- Bibliography of the history of eugenics

== Concepts ==
- Designer baby
- Disability-selective abortion
- Dysgenics
- Fertility and intelligence
- Genetic discrimination
- New eugenics
- Race suicide
- Racial hygiene
- Social cleansing
- Social Darwinism
- Survival of the fittest
- TESCREAL

== Ideologies ==
=== Eugenic feminism ===
- Eugenic feminism
- The Famous Five (Canada)
- Herland (novel)
- Hildegart Rodríguez Carballeira
- With Her in Ourland

=== Scientific racism ===
- 1995 University of Maryland conference on crime and genetics
- Anglo-Saxonism
- Anthropological criminology
- Aryanism
- Ashkenazi Jewish intelligence
- The Bell Curve
- Craniometry
- History of anthropometry
- History of the race and intelligence controversy
- Human Diversity Foundation
- An Investigation of Global Policy with the Yamato Race as Nucleus
- Nordicism
- Notes and Queries on Anthropology
- OpenPsych
- Political abuse of psychiatry
- Race and intelligence
- Race, Evolution, and Behavior
- Race-norming
- The Rising Tide of Color Against White World-Supremacy
- Scientific racism
- Washington Summit Publishers

== History ==
- Eugenics manifesto
- History of eugenics
- Medical experimentation in Africa
- Scientific Charity Movement
- Social degeneration
- Social hygiene movement
- Social purity movement

== Compulsory sterilization ==
- Compulsory sterilization
- Forced contraception of women in Greenland
- Forced sterilization in Peru
- Give Us Our Skeletons
- National Population Program
- No más bebés
- Plan Verde

== Eugenics by country ==
=== Canada ===
- Compulsory sterilization in Canada
- Living Archives on Eugenics in Western Canada
- Leilani Muir
- Sexual Sterilization Act
- The Sterilization of Leilani Muir

=== Spain and Latin America ===
- Blanqueamiento
- Eugenics in Mexico
- Ham's Redemption
- Hispanic eugenics
- Lost children of Francoism
- Motherhood in Francoist Spain
- La raza cósmica
- Women's sexuality in Francoist Spain

=== Switzerland ===
- Children of the Open Road
- Human sterilization in Switzerland
- Kinder der Landstrasse
- Lubo (film)
- Mariella Mehr
- Pro Juventute
- Swiss children coercion reparation initiative
- Waldhaus Psychiatric Clinic Genealogical Archives

=== United Kingdom ===
- Brock Report
- London Conference on Intelligence
- Sir Ronald Fisher window

=== United States ===
- Joe Arridy
- Average Young American Male (1921)
- Ben-Ishmael Tribe
- DezNat
- Eugenics in California
- Eugenics in Minnesota
- Eugenics in Oregon
- Eugenics in the United States
- Eugenics Survey of Vermont
- Heredity Commission
- Human Biodiversity Institute
- Immigration Act of 1917
- Immigration Act of 1924
- Jukes family
- Pierrepont Noyes
- Oneida stirpiculture
- Personal life of Jeffrey Epstein
- Population Association of America
- Racial uplift
- Ralstonism
- Repository for Germinal Choice
- State schools for people with disabilities
- Elizabeth Tuttle
- Virginia State Colony for Epileptics and Feebleminded

==== Sterilization in the United States ====
- Arizona State Hospital
- Buck v. Bell
- Carrie Buck
- Compulsory sterilization of disabled people in the U.S. prison system
- Doe ex. rel. Tarlow v. District of Columbia
- Nancy Hernandez
- Ann Cooper Hewitt
- Irwin County Detention Center
- Madrigal v. Quilligan
- La Operación
- Poe v. Lynchburg Training School & Hospital
- Relf sisters
- Skinner v. Oklahoma
- Sterilization law in the United States
- Sterilization of Latinas
- Sterilization of Native American women
- Stump v. Sparkman
- U.S. sterilization policies in Puerto Rico
- Virginia Sterilization Act of 1924

=== Nazi Germany ===
- Action 14f13
- Alles Leben ist Kampf
- Anton Loibl GmbH
- Hans Asperger
- Child euthanasia in Nazi Germany
- Dasein ohne Leben
- Deaf organizations during the Holocaust
- Doctors' Trial
- Euthanasia trials
- Expert Committee on Questions of Population and Racial Policy
- Fischer–Saller scale
- Law for the Prevention of Hereditarily Diseased Offspring
- Lebensborn
- Life unworthy of life
- Moringen concentration camp
- Nazi eugenics
- Nuremberg Laws
- Racial policy of Nazi Germany
- Wilhelm Rediess
- Friedrich Ruttner
- Spring of Life (2000 film)
- Sterilization of deaf people in Nazi Germany
- Untermensch

==== Aktion T4 ====
- Aktion Brandt
- Aktion T4
- Carlshof Institutions
- Erbkrank
- Gemeinnützige Krankentransport GmbH
- I Accuse (1941 film)
- Leon Jaworski
- Provincial Mental Sanatorium Kortau
- Lothar Kreyssig
- Massacre of patients at the Kobierzyn psychiatric hospital
- Memorandum Authorizing Involuntary Euthanasia
- Memorial to the Victims of National Socialist 'Euthanasia' Killings
- List of Nazi doctors
- Nazi euthanasia and the Catholic Church
- Andreas Rett
- Alice Ricciardi-von Platen
- T4-Gutachter
- Tiergartenstraße

==== Killing centres ====
- Am Spiegelgrund clinic
- Bernburg killing centre
- Brandenburg killing centre
- Grafeneck killing centre
- Gugging
- Hadamar killing centre
- Hartheim killing centre
- Kalmenhof
- Soldau concentration camp
- Sonnenstein killing centre

==== People ====
- Rosemarie Albrecht
- Erich Bauer
- August Becker
- Rudolf Beckmann
- Werner Blankenburg
- Kurt Bolender
- Philipp Bouhler
- Viktor Brack
- Karl Brandt
- Paul Bredow
- Werner Catel
- Leonardo Conti
- Max de Crinis
- Irmfried Eberl
- Kurt Franz
- Karl Frenzel
- Erich Fuchs
- Ernst-Robert Grawitz
- Heinrich Gross
- Lorenz Hackenholt
- Richard von Hegener
- Hans Heinze
- Otto Hellmuth
- Gottlieb Hering
- Werner Heyde
- Josef Hirtreiter
- Waldemar Hoven
- Irmgard Huber
- Ernst Illing
- Alfred Ittner
- Helmut Kallmeyer
- Wilhelm Koppe
- Erwin Lambert
- Henryk Mania
- Friedrich Mauz
- Willi Mentz
- Hermann Michel
- August Miete
- Paul Nitsche
- Josef Oberhauser
- Friedrich Panse
- Philipp, Landgrave of Hesse
- Karl Pötzinger
- Franz Reichleitner
- Carl-Heinz Rodenberg
- Carl Schneider
- Johannes Heinrich Schultz
- Walter Schultze
- Franz Schwede
- Otto Stadie
- Franz Stangl
- Ernst Stengelin
- Karl Steubl
- Franz Suchomel
- Siegfried Uiberreither
- Werner Villinger
- Gustav Wagner
- Erich Wasicky
- Albert Widmann
- Christian Wirth
- Franz Wolf (SS officer)
- Ernst Zierke

==== Victims ====
- Olga Benário Prestes
- Adolf Böhm
- Hilde Ephraim
- Martin Gauger
- Paul Gösch
- Luise Greger
- Jakob van Hoddis
- Maria Michał Kowalski
- Gerhard Kretschmar
- Carl Langhein
- Elfriede Lohse-Wächtler
- Ida Maly
- Princess Maria Karoline of Saxe-Coburg and Gotha
- Franz Pohl

==== Kaiser Wilhelm Institute of Anthropology ====
- Wolfgang Abel
- Peter Emil Becker
- Eugen Fischer
- Kaiser Wilhelm Institute of Anthropology, Human Heredity, and Eugenics
- Irawati Karve
- Fritz Lenz
- Karin Magnussen
- Josef Mengele
- Helmut Poppendick

=== Other countries ===
- Compulsory sterilisation in Sweden
- Eugenics in France
- Eugenics in Japan
- German interracial marriage debate (1912)
- Iron Fist Campaign
- Persecution of Uyghurs in China
- Population planning in Singapore
- Something Like a War
- Uttawar forced sterilisations
- Volkskörper

== Organizations ==
- Adelphi Genetics Forum
- Alberta Eugenics Board
- American Association for the Study and Prevention of Infant Mortality
- American Eugenics Society
- Co-operative Women's Guild
- Elwyn (company)
- Eugenics Board of North Carolina
- Eugenics Record Office
- Foundation for Research and Education on Eugenics and Dysgenics
- French Foundation for the Study of Human Problems
- Galton Laboratory
- German Society for Racial Hygiene
- Gobineau Association
- Hereditary Health Court
- Human Betterment Foundation
- Human Betterment League
- Institutions for Defective Delinquents
- International Association for the Advancement of Ethnology and Eugenics
- International Eugenics Conference
- International Federation of Eugenics Organizations
- Julius Klaus-Stiftung
- Oneida Community
- Pathfinder International
- Pioneer Fund
- Race Betterment Foundation
- Racial Hygiene Association of New South Wales
- Rockefeller Foundation
- Society for the Right to Die
- State Institute for Racial Biology

== People ==
=== American ===
- Jane Addams
- Clairette Papin Armstrong
- Guy W. Bailey
- Richard Barrett (lawyer)
- Norman Bel Geddes
- Maurice Bigelow
- Elizabeth Blackwell
- Anna Blount
- Mary Carson Breckinridge
- Carl Brigham
- Lathrop Brown
- Luther Burbank
- Guy Irving Burch
- Edgar Rice Burroughs
- Charles Codman Cabot
- William E. Castle
- Harry Chandler
- Robert C. Cook
- John Merle Coulter
- Earnest Sevier Cox
- Charles Davenport
- Gertrude Crotty Davenport
- Eugenie Mary Ladenburg Davie
- James J. Davis
- Joseph DeJarnette
- Lydia Allen DeVilbiss
- Charles Fremont Dight
- Malcolm Donald
- George Draper (physician)
- Wickliffe Draper
- W. E. B. Du Bois
- George Eastman
- Thomas F. Ellis
- Jeffrey Epstein
- Arthur Estabrook
- Henry Pratt Fairchild
- Samuel Simeon Fels
- Walter E. Fernald
- Irving Fisher
- Diana Fleischman
- Joseph Fletcher
- Clarence Gamble
- Henry Garrett (psychologist)
- Marcus Garvey
- Charlotte Perkins Gilman
- John Glad
- Henry H. Goddard
- Charles Goethe
- Willystine Goodsell
- E. S. Gosney
- Linda Gottfredson
- Robert Klark Graham
- Madison Grant
- A. James Gregor
- Henry Rice Guild
- Alan Frank Guttmacher
- Harry J. Haiselden
- Prescott F. Hall
- Richard Hanania
- Garrett Hardin
- John Marshall Harlan II
- Moses Harman
- Henry Harpending
- Mary Williamson Harriman
- James L. Hart
- Frederick W. Hatch (psychiatrist)
- Willet M. Hays
- Martin Luther Holbrook
- Oliver Wendell Holmes Jr.
- Samuel Jackson Holmes
- Luther Emmett Holt
- Aleš Hrdlička
- Ellsworth Huntington
- Henry S. Huntington
- Dwight Ingle
- William T. Innes
- Augustus Sol Invictus
- Seymour Itzkoff
- Herbert Spencer Jennings
- Albert Johnson (Washington politician)
- Roswell Hill Johnson
- David Starr Jordan
- Helen Keller
- Ida Augusta Keller
- John Harvey Kellogg
- Robert Foster Kennedy
- Wilhelmine Key
- Ben Klassen
- Rufus B. von KleinSmid
- Sigard Adolphus Knopf
- James P. Kranz Jr.
- Wallace Kuralt
- Robert E. Kuttner
- Walter Landauer
- Christopher Langan
- Harry H. Laughlin
- Anton LaVey
- Joseph LeConte
- Joshua Lederberg
- William Gordon Lennox
- Nell Battle Lewis
- Charles Lindbergh
- C. C. Little
- Lana Lokteff
- Jack London
- Madge Macklin
- Charles Martin (Oregon politician)
- Onera Amelia Merritt-Hawkes
- Adolf Meyer (psychiatrist)
- Edward M. Miller
- William Dawes Miller
- Robert Millikan
- Alice Lee Moqué
- Edwin D. Morgan (businessman)
- George Van Horn Moseley
- Hermann Joseph Muller
- Marian Olden
- Frederick Osborn
- Henry Fairfield Osborn
- R. Travis Osborne
- Marion A. Parrott
- Russell Pearce
- William Dudley Pelley
- Elmer Pendell
- Henry Farnham Perkins
- Cornelia Marvin Pierce
- Walter M. Pierce
- Walter Plecker
- Paul Popenoe
- Charles Francis Potter
- A. S. Priddy
- William J. Robinson
- John D. Rockefeller Jr.
- Aaron Rosanoff
- Mary Harriman Rumsey
- Herbert Charles Sanborn
- Margaret Sanger
- Karl Schakel
- Ada Estelle Schweitzer
- Harry L. Shapiro
- Harry Clay Sharp
- William Herbert Sheldon
- William Shockley
- William Gayley Simpson
- Elmer Ernest Southard
- Randolph L. Speight
- Leo Stanley
- Morris Steggerda
- Lothrop Stoddard
- Aubrey E. Strode
- Donald A. Swan
- John Tanton
- F. W. Taussig
- Woolsey Teller
- Lewis Terman
- Nikola Tesla
- Edward Thorndike
- Allen W. Thurman
- William Lawrence Tower
- John B. Trevor Jr.
- John B. Trevor Sr.
- Victor C. Vaughan
- Daniel Vining Jr.
- Stephen Sargent Visher
- Walter L. Voegtlin
- August Vollmer
- Francis E. Walter
- Robert DeCourcy Ward
- Harry F. Weyher Jr.
- Nathaniel Weyl
- Mary Traffarn Whitney
- Albert E. Wiggam
- Abraham Wolbarst
- Victoria Woodhull
- Robert Yerkes

=== Australian ===
- Nicholas Agar
- Richard Arthur (Australian politician)
- Richard James Arthur Berry
- Angela Elizabeth Booth
- John Eldridge (politician)
- Lillie Goodisson
- Aubrey Lewis
- Marion Louisa Piddington
- Stanley Porteus
- Ruby Sophia Rich

=== Austrian ===
- Christian von Ehrenfels
- Rudolf Goldscheid
- Max von Gruber
- Geza von Hoffmann
- Jörg Lanz von Liebenfels
- Fritz Schachermeyr
- Günther Schwab
- Julius Tandler
- Eduard Paul Tratz
- Julius Wagner-Jauregg

=== Brazilian ===
- Júlio Afrânio Peixoto
- Arnaldo Vieira de Carvalho
- Miguel Couto
- Lourenço Filho
- Renato Kehl
- Juliano Moreira
- Artur Neiva
- Raimundo Nina Rodrigues
- Wilson Leite Passos
- Oliveira Viana

=== British ===
- Leonard Arthur
- James Barr (physician)
- Florence Barrett
- George Bedborough
- Alexander Graham Bell
- Julia Bell (geneticist)
- William Beveridge
- Carlos Blacker
- Edward Brabrook
- Chris Brand
- Laurence Brock
- Cyril Burt
- Alexander Carr-Saunders
- Cedric Carter
- Raymond Cattell
- William Chapple (New Zealand politician)
- Elizabeth Chesser
- Archibald Church
- Stella Churchill
- Winston Churchill
- David Coleman (demographer)
- James Crichton-Browne
- J. H. Curle
- C. D. Darlington
- Charles Galton Darwin
- Leonard Darwin
- Ruth Darwin
- Mary Dendy
- Lord Malcolm Douglas-Hamilton
- Bessie Drysdale
- Charles Vickery Drysdale
- Binnie Dunlop
- Ethel M. Elderton
- Havelock Ellis
- Ronald Fisher
- E. B. Ford
- Agnes Fry
- Francis Galton
- Thomas John Gerrard
- John Walter Gregory
- J. B. S. Haldane
- Thomas Horder, 1st Baron Horder
- Vera Houghton
- Woods Hutchinson
- Julian Huxley
- William Ralph Inge
- Arthur Keith
- Arabella Kenealy
- John Maynard Keynes
- François Lafitte
- Nick Land
- Frida Laski
- Frederick Lindemann, 1st Viscount Cherwell
- Anthony Ludovici
- Richard Lynn
- Ernest MacBride
- Thomas Fauset MacDonald
- Bernard Mallet
- James Marchant
- William McDougall (psychologist)
- Stewart Andrew McDowall
- Raw Egg Nationalist
- Sybil Neville-Rolfe
- Emmeline Pankhurst
- Karl Pearson
- Roger Pearson (anthropologist)
- George Pitt-Rivers
- Humphry Rolleston
- Redcliffe Salaman
- Caleb Saleeby
- F. C. S. Schiller
- Albert Seward
- George Bernard Shaw
- Eliot Slater
- Marie Stopes
- Frances Swiney
- Richard Titmuss
- A. F. Tredgold
- John Tyndall (far-right activist)
- Alice Vickery
- Allan Warner (physician)
- Arnold Wilson
- Helena Rosa Wright

=== Canadian ===
- Charles Kirk Clarke
- Wallace Warren Cross
- Reginald Ruggles Gates
- Margaret Gunn
- George Hoadley (Alberta politician)
- Alvin Ratz Kaufman
- Watson Kirkconnell
- John M. MacEachran
- Nellie McClung
- Stefan Molyneux
- William B. Munro
- Emily Murphy
- Irene Parlby
- J. Philippe Rushton
- Robert Charles Wallace

=== Chinese ===
- He Jiankui
- Kang Youwei
- Pan Guangdan
- Zhang Jingsheng

=== Finnish ===
- Reidar Hedman
- Väinö Lassila
- Lauri Pihkala
- Martti Pihkala
- Hilja Riipinen

=== French ===
- André Bloch (mathematician)
- Maxime Blocq-Mascart
- Alexis Carrel
- Arthur de Gobineau
- George Montandon
- Bénédict Morel
- Adolphe Quetelet
- Jean Rostand
- Georges Vacher de Lapouge
- Serge Voronoff

=== German ===
- Otto Ammon
- Karl Astel
- Gertrud Bäumer
- Karl Binding
- Agnes Bluhm
- Hermann Boehm (eugenicist)
- Hermann Brauneck
- Hans Julius Duncker
- Charles Edward, Duke of Saxe-Coburg and Gotha
- Walter Gross (politician)
- Alfred Grotjahn
- Hans F. K. Günther
- Ernst Haeckel
- Willibald Hentschel
- Heinrich Himmler
- Adolf Hitler
- Alfred Hoche
- Max Hodann
- Franz Josef Kallmann
- Edwin Katzen-Ellenbogen
- Emil Kraepelin
- Hans Lubinus
- Gerhard Meisenberg
- Otfrid Mittmann
- Hans Nachtsheim
- Oda Olberg
- Alfred Ploetz
- Heinrich Wilhelm Poll
- Ernst Rodenwaldt
- Ernst Rüdin
- Arthur Ruppin
- Thilo Sarrazin
- Wilhelm Schallmayer
- Ludwig Schemann
- Richard Ungewitter
- Otmar Freiherr von Verschuer
- Ernst August Wagner
- Gerhard Wagner (physician)
- Wilhelm Weygandt

=== Italian ===
- Julius Evola
- Corrado Gini
- Giuseppe Sergi

=== Romanian ===
- Ion Agârbiceanu
- Gheorghe Banu
- Lotte Binder
- Alexandrina Cantacuzino
- Salvator Cupcea
- Traian Herseni
- Sabin Manuilă
- Gheorghe Marinescu
- Nicolae Paulescu
- Bronze Age Pervert
- Constantin Rădulescu-Motru
- Francisc Rainer
- Eugen Relgis
- Izabela Sadoveanu-Evan
- Florian Ștefănescu-Goangă
- Eraclie Sterian
- Alexandru Tzigara-Samurcaș

=== Spanish ===
- José María Albiñana
- Aurora Rodríguez Carballeira
- Matilde de la Torre
- Antonio Vallejo-Nájera

=== Swedish ===
- Gunnar Dahlberg
- Herman Bernhard Lundborg
- Bertil Lundman
- Herman Nilsson-Ehle

=== Swiss ===
- Eugen Bleuler
- Auguste Forel
- Johann Joseph Jörger
- Hans W. Maier
- Otto Schlaginhaufen
- Jenny Thomann-Koller
- Stavros Zurukzoglu

=== Other ===
- Amy Barrington
- Hans Betzhold
- Raquel Camaña
- Charles D'Arcy
- A. N. Field
- Ladislav Haškovec
- Eusebio Hernández Pérez
- Hiratsuka Raichō
- Lene Koch
- Norman Lowell
- Max Nordau
- Alfred Nossig
- Tenrei Ōta
- Nicolás Palacios
- Narayan Sitaram Phadke
- John Runnström
- Johan Scharffenberg
- Alexander Serebrovsky (geneticist)
- José Vasconcelos
- Varg Vikernes
- Augustyn Wróblewski

== Works ==
=== Books ===
- After Us, or the World as it Might Be
- Better-World Philosophy
- The Blood of the Nation
- Dwellers in the Vale of Siddem
- Eugenical Sterilization in the United States
- The Genetical Theory of Natural Selection
- Germany Must Perish!
- Hereditary Genius
- Heredity in Relation to Eugenics
- Illiberal Reformers
- Inquiries into Human Faculty and Its Development
- IQ and Global Inequality
- The Kallikak Family
- Man, the Unknown
- The Passing of the Great Race
- The Pivot of Civilization
- Racial Hygiene: Medicine Under the Nazis
- Sex Histories
- Superior: The Return of Race Science
- War Against the Weak
- Which Way Western Man?
- Why Fish Don't Exist

=== Periodicals ===
- American Renaissance (magazine)
- Annals of Eugenics
- Birth Control Review
- The Eugenics Review
- Journal of Social, Political and Economic Studies
- Mankind Quarterly
- Neue Anthropologie
- Neues Volk
- Süddeutsche Monatshefte

=== Fiction ===
- Bene Gesserit
- Beyond This Horizon
- The Bladerunner
- Brave New World
- Cylinder van Troffa
- The Foundling (Leary novel)
- Galactic Milieu
- Gallia (novel)
- The Gate to Women's Country
- Heart of a Dog
- Howard families
- Kwisatz Haderach
- The Marching Morons
- Moving the Mountain (novel)
- The Neanderthal Parallax
- Prelude to Christopher
- O Presidente Negro
- Rite of Passage (novel)
- Khan Noonien Singh
- Super soldier
- Triplanetary (novel)
- War World (series)
- Wild Seed (novel)

=== Films ===
- The Black Stork
- A Dangerous Idea: Eugenics, Genetics and the American Dream
- Dark Medicine
- Endgame (2007 film)
- The Escape (1914 film)
- Expelled: No Intelligence Allowed
- Freaks (1932 film)
- Gattaca
- Homo Sapiens 1900
- Maafa 21
- Man of Steel (film)
- Married in Name Only
- My Daughter Hildegart
- Never Look Away (2018 film)
- The New Man (film)
- Picnic on the Grass
- Tomorrow's Children
- The Very Idea
- Where Are My Children?

=== Television ===
- The Augments
- Borderland (Star Trek: Enterprise)
- Cold Station 12
- Eve (The X-Files)
- The Masterpiece Society
- Men Against Fire
- Space Seed
- Statistical Probabilities
