= Motherhood in Francoist Spain =

Francoist Spain: politicized motherhood

Motherhood in Francoist Spain was the definition of being a woman. Motherhood was important to the state because Hispanic eugenics saw women's bodies as state property. They were needed to rebuild Spain by creating a race of people aligned with the prevailing Catholic morality of the period. The regime then created numerous laws to enforce its vision of motherhood. These would not begin to relax until the late 1950s, and only face radical changes in the post-Franco period.

Women's daily lives centered around the home, where they were largely legally confined. This could leave many women socially isolated, especially if they were forced into internal migration as a result of economic reason. Up until at least the late 1960s, domestic life was hard as most households lacked fridges, televisions and cars. Only the death of Franco would see women finally able to socially be free of the household.

Abortion and contraception usage were both illegal. Women who did not want to be mothers who had abortions could be sent to prison, a penalty that continued even into near the end of the socialist transition period.

Many women in prison were also mothers. Most were allowed to keep their children until age three, before the state took custody of them so the children could be properly indoctrinated with statist ideology. Many pregnant women behind bars had their children kidnapped by the state, the names of their children legally changed, and then placed into homes of regime loyalists.

Mothers in exile had the support of Unión de Mujeres Españoles. Feminists never addressed the illegitimate concern of the regime defining womanhood as motherhood during the Francoist period. They only began to challenge this narrative after Franco's death in 1975.

== Regime definition and ideological and legal support ==
Hispanic eugenics was pioneered by doctors like Antonio Vallejo Nájera and Gregorio Marañón. Antes que te cases was published by Nájera in 1946, with one part saying, "Racial decadence is the result of many things but the most important is conjugal unhappiness in the most prosperous and happy of homes. ... Eugenic precepts may avoid morbid offspring. ... It is impossible a robust race without a sound preparation of youth for marriage, through Catholic orality. This little work is a minuscule contribution to the exaltation of the Fatherland." Marañón's 1921 Maternidad y feminismo, republished as a second edition in 1951, said, "The difference between the sexes is insurmountable. Such difference emerges from the anatomical surface of each man and woman, and it goes to the deepest, darkest roots of life, to the home of the cells."

Women in Francoist Spain in the immediate post-war period were viewed as essential towards the rebuilding of the country, with their most important aspect being viewed as their bodies. Francoist Spain believed women should become mothers, reproducing to support the needs of the state. They were to give themselves over to this task in both body and soul. A 28 December 1939 decree officially put the Women's Section of Falange in charge of preparing women for their role in the Spanish state as mothers and homemakers.

Motherhood became the primary social function of women in Francoist Spain. Still, while motherhood played this critical societal role it was one the regime only wanted to see perpetuated among those who shared in their political ideology. Children of mothers with leftist or Republican leanings were often removed from their care in order to prevent mothers from sharing their ideology with their offspring.

Dr. Luque was quoted in the SF magazine Y in 1938 as saying, "In the state, the woman/mother has to be the most important citizen. Those are the words that Hitler said in his fundamental program. Because we know he is totally right, and because we are aware of the importance of getting as many healthy children from healthy mothers as we can for our country at this moment, we have to make this statement come true, not only in words but in action."

The state set up a battle between women, by encouraging women to define themselves as mothers and state patriots or as prostitutes who opposed to the state. It was supposed by Pope Pius XII's 1951 direction on the purpose of Christian marriage, which said, "In accordance with the Creator's will, matrimony, as an institution of nature, has not as a primary and intimate end the personal perfection of the married couple but rather the procreation and upbringing of new life. ... One of the fundamental demands of the true moral order is the sincere acceptance of motherhood's function and duties." In the case of Spain, the Franco regime's imperative view was motherhood should only ever occur in the context of marriage.

Regime approved women's instructional manuals during the 1950s and 1960s followed the style of Spanish Baroque conduct manuals. Themes in these works included the marriage market in Spain, and how to navigate it in religious, political and sexual contexts. In their later period, they highlighted the growing gender conflicts in the family.

Single mothers were legally and socially marginalized by the state. This was because the state viewed single mothers as women who had disgraced themselves by having sex outside marriage.

Meaningful legal reforms for women did not begin to happen in the Civil Code until the late 1950s and early 1960s. These changes were a result of pressure by women to make the law more aligned with cultural shifts in attitudes. One such modification happened following a newspaper article by Mercedes Formica about a man who stabbed his wife to death. The modification in the 1889 Civil Code gave greater protections to married women. Other changes in law saw the home being redefined as less a husband's domain but a family domain. Married women were entitled to half a couple's common property, and husbands were required to get their wives' permission before selling women's half. When widowed woman with children remarried, she was now allowed to keep custody of her children in the new marriage. The Blood Revenge law was rescinded in 1963, with husbands and fathers no longer having the right to kill wives or daughters caught engaging in elicit sex acts. A reform in 1970 meant that women could prevent their husbands from putting their children up for adoption without their consent. The law changed in 1972 to give women more freedom from their fathers. It allowed women 22 years old and older to leave the familial home without the consent of their parents. The last major legal reform for women occurred in May 1975, when men were stripped of their automatic head of household status, with women no longer required by law to obey them or be forced to take their husbands' nationality.

Following Franco's death, Spain underwent massive change that culminated in the Constitution of 1978. This document returned Spain to being a country where women were guaranteed full equal rights under the law. Reforms in the post-Francoist period saw the Catholic Church lose official status in government, the age of legal majority moved from 21 to 18, and marriage defining men and women equally. A few years later, in July 1981, divorce was again legal with 260,000 legal separations and 195,000 divorces being processed between 1981 and 1990.

== Daily life ==
The 1938 Fuero del Trabajo law imposed upon women the role of housewife, by preventing them from participating in the workforce after they married so as to "liberate married women from the workshops and factories". From 1939 to 1946, there was a monthly allowance of 30 pesetas for families with two children. This allowance increased based on the number of additional children in the household.

Internal Spanish women migrants found life in Spain difficult during the 1940s, 1950s and 1960s as Francoist policy dictated they remain in the home. Unlike their husbands who could new develop social connections through outside employment, immigrant women were isolated having left behind their previous social support networks. In the Basque country, both Basque and Spanish women in the Basque country would remain socially isolated until the 1970s when younger women began to push their way inside the dominant culture. This included going to bars and restaurants.

In the 1940s, women were barred from a number of professions. These included being a magistrate, diplomat, notary, customs officer, stock broker, and prison doctor. This was because women's primary job was to be a homemaker. Domestic life in Spain in 1960 was different than today. Only 4% of households had fridges, while 1% had televisions and 4% had cars. The death of Franco in 1975 represented for women the start of a double transition, where they suddenly saw political and cultural power as a group that saw massive changes to their daily lives and the country itself transitioned to democracy.

Despite cultural changes brought upon society as a result of the transition to democracy, many Spanish women in the 1990s continued to support the concept that a women's most important role was the one in her home and that the church should play a center role in the most important acts in a woman's life. This belief is manifested in ideas like young women of the period still seeking out Catholic Church weddings, even if they were not practicing Catholics. It also manifested itself with men, in the belief that despite women earning commensurate salaries, men should not be involved with domestic duties like cleaning and taking care of children inside their household.

Schedule for housewife with husband and child by Sección Feminina in 1957
Weekday	6:00 - 7:30	7:30 - 9:00	9:00 - 9:45	9:45 - 10:45	10:45 - 12:00	12:00 - 12:30	12:30 - 13:00	13:00 - 14:00	14:15 - 17:00	17:15 - 17:30	17:30 - 19:00	19:00 - 20:00	20:30 - 21:00	20:30 - 21:00	21:00 - 22:00	22:00
Monday	Get up, make fire, prepare breakfast, prepare stew, beans, etc.	Fix bedroom. Personal hygiene. Send child to school.	Do shopping.	Clean house.	Prepare food. Collect child from school.	Eat with the family.	Tidy the kitchen.	Prepare clothing for washing. Take child to school.	Clean clothes. Leave them in bleach.	Collect child from school. Merienda.	Sewing.	Prepare dinner.	Dinner with the family.	Kitchen arrangement. Think about food for tomorrow. Put legumes in water.	Put child to bed.	Go to bed.
Tuesday	See above.	See above.	See above.	See above.	See above.	See above.	See above.	Rinse clothes. Take child to school.	Hang out the washing. Sewing.	See above.	See above.	See above.	See above.	See above.	See above.	See above.
Wednesday	See above.	See above.	See above.	See above.	See above.	See above.	See above.	Pick up clothes. Take child to school.	Review.	See above.	Sew a while. Do some reading.	See above.	See above.	See above.	See above.	See above.
Thursday	See above.	Arrange bedroom. There is no school.	Personal hygiene. Shopping.	See above.	Prepare food.	See above.	See above.	Iron clothes.	Iron delicates.	Prepare merienda. Go for a walk with the child, or to the children's section, if it rains.		See above.	See above.	See above.	See above.	See above.
Friday	See above.	Arrange kitchen.	See above.	School.	See above.	See above.	See above.	Clean and organize closet. Put away clothes.	Wash socks, stockings and kitchen towels.	Collect child from school. Merienda.	Go for a visit or to shop.	See above.	See above.	See above.	See above.	See above.
Saturday	See above.	Clean bedroom and bathroom. Take child to school.	Shopping.	See above.				Clean the whole kitchen.	Darn socks and stockings.	See above.	Shop for Sunday.	See above.	Bathe child.	Dinner and clean kitchen.	See above.	See above.
Sunday	Get up at 7, put fire and prepare breakfast and clean clothes.		Ready child to leave house, personal hygiene and prepare for mass at ten.	Light cleaning around the house and food preparation.		See above.	Tidy the kitchen.	Siesta.	In winter, a walk and merienda. In summer, sit and relax.	In summer, prepare dinner. In winter, family time.		In summer, a walk and dinner in the field. In winter, prepare and have dinner with the family.		Clean kitchen. Think about food for tomorrow.	See above.	See above.

== Fertility and maternal care ==
Spanish fertility rates during the Franco period had four stages. The first was from 1913 to 1940, with a range of around 25 to 30 live births per thousand women with a precipitous decline during the Civil War period. The second stage was from 1940 to 1964 with a range of around 20 births per thousand women. The third stage was from 1965 to 1974, where the rate was moderate for around a decade. The last stage was 1975 to 1989 with a drop to around 10 live births per thousand women.

Starting in 1950, the government started tracking the number of births at state-run maternity homes. In the period between 1950 and 1955, 91 state-run maternity homes assisted 39,939 mothers in giving birth. By 1956, these numbers had increased with 130 centers assisting 52,222 mothers.

Birth rate and women's marriage age
Year	Birth rate per thousand women	Percentages of marriages where women were under the age of 20	ref
1913	31	17	
1930	27	15	
1938	16	12	
1940	26	12.5	
1941	20	13	
1943	22	12	
1975	19	27	

== Abortion and contraception ==
Doctors in Francoist Spain had two roles: to be moral protectors of Spanish reproduction and to provide science-based medical services. This put male doctors in charge of women's birth control. When medical doctors in the Second Republic and early Francoist period defended birth control, it was on the eugenics grounds that it protected the health of both women and children, especially as it related to the spread of genetic disease and the spread of tuberculosis and sexually transmitted diseases.

1941 saw legislation that formally made abortion and conception usage illegal with attached punishments. Sex education was also banned, with punishments attached for teaching it. Condoms were illegal during almost the whole of the Franco regime. Most couples practicing family planning used coitus interruptus during the 1940s and 1950s. The Catholic Church in this period allowed couples to use the rhythm method. As American culture began to influence Spain more during the mid-1950s, Spaniards began to adopt more American birth control methods.

Despite contraception being illegal, by the mid-1960s, Spanish women had access to the contraceptive pill. Women could be prescribed the pill by their doctors if they were married and could make a case that they had a gynecological problem which the pill could fix, but this reason could not be a desire to avoid being pregnant. During the mid-1970s, the Catholic Church preached that no physical barrier should be present during sex, and that even post-coital washes were problematic as they interfered with the primary goal of sex being conception. The Catholic Church taught the only acceptable reproductive control methods were abstinence and the rhythm method.

Because abortion was illegal in Spain, during the 1970s, Spanish women who could afford it went to London to get abortions. In 1974, 2,863 Spanish women had abortions in London. In 1975, 4,230 Spanish women had abortions in London. In a four-month period in 1976, 2,726 Spanish women went to London for abortions. In 1979, 16,433 Spanish women had abortions in London. In 1981, 22,000 Spanish women went to London for an abortion.

The first organization created about women's reproductive health and birth control was opened in Madrid in 1976 by Federico Rubio. Asociación de Mujeres de Aluche was one of the earlier women's reproductive health and birth control centers, creating in the first years after the end of the dictatorship.

Ahead of the Year of the Woman, the government created eight commissions to investigate the status of Spanish women. The government used reports from these commissions to produce two reports that were published in 1975. They were La situación de la mujer en España and Memoria del Año Internacional de la Mujer. In their reports, single motherhood was identified as a problem, though they noted it was in decline which they attributed in part to the use of the pill and other contraceptives, and to women having abortions in other countries where the practice was legal.

In the period between 1974 and 1978, feminists protested for amnesty for women, including those convicted of abortion, contraception, adultery and prostitution-related offenses who were in prison. These feminists were attacked by the police using tear gas and smoke bombs. Feminists also held protests in support of the decriminalization of adultery, equality in the workforce, the right to assembly, the ability to strike, and the suppression of images the movement felt were degrading to women. Abortion remained illegal, with eleven women being convicted of having abortions in 1982. One of these eleven received a prison sentence of ten years. The law would not change until 1985, when medically induced abortions were allowed if a mother's life was at risk, if the pregnancy was a result of rape, or if the fetus had a deformity. 58,000 abortions would take place in Spain between 19871 and 1989. Poor women with few options would sometimes have an abortion by having someone hit them in the stomach.

In 1981, the Comisión Pro Derecho al aborto de Madrid produced a 39-page document detailing statistical information about abortion in Spain based on data from the Centro de Mujeres de Vallecas. Its data found that of the 820 women who had abortions, 68% were married, 3% were widowed and 29% were single. Of the 600 women were data was available, they found that 86.9% had their abortion before 12 weeks, that 72% had gone abroad despite limited financial resources to secure an abortion, and that 45.69% had an abortion for economic reasons.

1979 was a pivotal year for abortion rights with the Bilbao Trial (Spanish: Juicio de Bilbao). The trial involved ten women and one man who were prosecuted for performing abortions. Prosecutors announced their intention to seek prison time of more than 100 years. With the original trial announced on 26 October 1979, it was not held until 1982 as a result of being suspended several times in the interim. The trial absolved nine of the women involved. A man who induced the abortions and a woman who performed them were found guilty. The ruling was appealed, with the appeal being suspended several times before being heard at the end of 1983. The results of the appeal resulted in four women being acquitted, and six women and the man were given prison sentences. In the end, those seven would eventually be pardoned by the state. A protest was held outside the Palau de la Generalitat in 1982 in support of the Bilbao eleven. By that point, they had been in prison for six years. At least one woman had been denounced by her ex-husband. In addition to prison times, prosecutors were seeking to strip the accused of their right to vote. At the Palau de la Generalitat protest in Barcelona, the police violently acted protesters. Police give several women head wounds. An amnesty petition for the Bilbao 11 was signed by over 1,300 women, including politicians, singers, artists and journalists who all affirmed that they abortions too. All but the person who performed the abortions were given amnesty in 1982.

Abortion was made legal by Congress in 1983, but did not enter into legal effect until 1985 as Coalición Popular (now Partido Popular) challenged the constitutionality of the law. The decriminalization of abortion was allowed for three reasons. The first was that it was ethical in the case of rape. The second was it could be necessary to save the life of the mother. The third reason was that eugenic, allowing abortion in case of fetal malformation. Other countries were legalizing abortion at the same time. Portugal's Parliament made abortion legal in November 1982. Italy made abortion legal in May 1981 as a result of a referendum.

1974 percentages of women by education level and birth control method based on Fundación FOESSA survey
Birth control method known	Without any education	Primary education	Middle education	Technical and professional education	Higher education	All levels of education
None	24	14	6	8	8	12
Coitus interruptus	19	22	57	44	66	31
Rhythm method and derivatives	13	30	72	60	83	41
Condoms	36	44	71	71	82	51
The pill	37	60	79	76	80	64
No answer	27	18	9	6	4	16

== Motherhood in Prison ==
A law passed on 30 March 1940 meant Republican women could keep their children with them in prison until the child turned three years old. At this point, children were then put into state care to prevent the contagion of Republican thinking from spreading. The number of children removed from Republican mothers between 1944 and 1954 was 30,960. These children were not allowed to remain in contact with their families, and many found themselves in centers run by Auxilio Social. When mothers were released from prisons, they were often watched to make sure they were good mothers as defined by the state. Actively surveilled, many women lost custody of new children they had.

Children of prisoners were taught in Catholic schools, as part of efforts to indoctrinate them in regime ideology, that their parents were in prison because they were traitors to the state. At the orders of Antonio Vallejo Nágera, children of women at Madrid's women's only Las Ventas prison were removed from their mothers and put into orphanages in order to prevent them being contaminated by "Marxist fanaticism."

The regime encouraged the separation of children from their mothers when they were imprisoned. When children born in prison reached three years of age (which was not common when they intentionally received a hypocaloric diet that caused high mortality), and when there were no relatives who could take care of them, they were "protected" by the Feminine Section of the Falange, and in particular the Patterns of Redemption of Penalties that were in charge of educating the children of the detainees.

== Stolen children ==
In November 1940, the Ministry of the Interior published a decree on war orphans, namely children of parents shot or disappeared (exiles, forgotten in prisons, fugitives and clandestine), according to which only "irreproachable persons from the point of view of religious, ethical and national view" could obtain the guardianship of those children. In December 1941, a law allowed children who did not remember their name, have been repatriated or whose parents could not be located were registered in the Civil Registry under a new name, which facilitated that they could be adopted irregularly. This practice extended to the entire period of the Franco dictatorship.

The order of instruction made by the Criminal Investigation Court n ° 5 of the Spanish National Audience put the number of children of republican detainees whose identities were supposedly changed in the Civil Registry delivered to families who supported the Francoist regime at 30,960 in the period between 1944 -1954. Spanish associations put the number of stolen children between 1940 and 1990 at closer to 300,000. According to a study published by Ricard Vinyes, between 1944 and 1945, the Patronage of San Pablo accounted for 30,000 children of incarcerated and exiled children, to whom 12,000 would have to be added, protected by the Patronato de la Merced.

In its declaration condemning the Franco dictatorship of the 17 of March 2006 (Recommendation 1736, point 72, 73, 74 and 75), the Council of Europe said that the "lost children" are victims of Francoism, since their "surnames they were modified to allow their adoption by families addicted to the regime". He also affirmed that " the Franco regime invoked the 'protection of minors', but the idea that applied of this protection was not distinguished from a punitive regime ", and that "they were frequently separated from the other categories of children interned in State Institutions. and subjected to physical and psychological abuse".

Mothers on the losing side sometimes had their babies taken from them, with the process being more formalized following the end of the Spanish Civil War and continuing on into the early 1980s. This was mainly done to single mothers. Sister María Gómez Valbuena was one of the only people to be investigated for kidnapping of these children. The network doing it during the regime was Opus Dei linked Dr. Ignacio Villa Elizaga.

== Motherhood in Exile ==
Republican mothers abroad addressed the problem of specifically being targeted by Franco's regime by in their own way. Spanish Communist women in exile suggested mothers in this period should fade into the background, serving in roles that supported single women and men who could be more visible in the struggle against Franco. Communists emphasized a traditional view of motherhood espoused by Franco.

Republican mothers in exile created the Unión de Mujeres Españoles (UME) in France. The purpose of the organization was to legitimize political activity of mothers as being part of the broader efforts of "female consciousness." UME published a magazine called Mujeres Antifascistas Españolas. The publication linked Republican women in exile with those in Spain, including some who were in prison. It honored women's roles as front line combatants, and suggested the special role of motherhood made their voices more valuable when it came to speaking out against the problems of the Franco regime. This contrasted to Spanish Communist women in exile beliefs, which suggested mothers in this period should fade into the background, serving in roles that supported single women and men who could be more visible in the struggle against Franco. Communists emphasized a traditional view of motherhood espoused by Franco.

== Feminists and motherhood ==
One of the issues for feminists in the 1930s, 1940s, 1950s, and 1960s was they never were able to successfully challenge the regime's definition of womanhood as motherhood. Those who did were not viewed as representative of the movements they came from. This included feminists in the pre-Civil War period like Hildegart Rodriguez and Lucia Sánchez Saornil. More common was for feminists to embrace the concept of motherhood, with Federica Montseny among this type of feminist.

One of the key successes for feminists in the 1970s was they were able to challenge the overriding narrative that womanhood was defined around motherhood. They made gender identity based around shared female experiences, the ability to make choices, a social itinerary and constructing their own history separate from motherhood. "Sexuality is not motherhood" (Spanish: Sexualidad no es maternidad) became a slogan of many feminists and feminists organizations by the end of 1975.
