= Women's sexuality in Francoist Spain =

Women's sexuality in Francoist Spain was defined by the Church and by the State. The purpose in doing so was to have women serve the state exclusively through reproduction and guarding the morality of the state. Women's sexuality could only be understood through the prism of reproduction and motherhood. Defying this could have tremendous negative consequences for women, including being labeled a prostitute, being removed from her family home, being sent to a concentration camp, a Catholic run institution or to a prison. It was only after the death of Franco in 1975 that women in Spain were finally allowed to define their own sexuality. Understanding Francoist imposed definitions of female sexuality is critical to understanding modern Spanish female sexuality, especially as it relates to macho behavior and women's expected responses to it.

Female bodies were stripped of their physicality and the regime did everything in their power to desexualize them. They existed for reproductive purposes. Clothing norms were equally restrictive as they were designed to further emphasize the asexual nature of women. Women were required to dress demurely, with long sleeves or elbow, no necklines, long and loose materials.

Women were taught that their role was to belong to one man and one man only. Female virginity became very important, and women who lost their virginity before marriage were considered to have dishonored themselves and their families. They could be kicked out of their homes, be institutionalized, or be forced to take steps to hide evidence of loss of virginity by having clandestine abortions or engaging in infanticide. Lesbians were not recognized, as they challenged the regime narrative that women's sole purpose was to procreate. The regime tried everything they could to render lesbians invisible. Despite this, lesbians created their own underground culture.

== Francoists defining women's sexuality ==
Hispanic eugenics and pronatalism were viewed as key components of addressing the decline in the Spanish birth rate and the need for an increased population size to serve the needs of the Spanish state during the Francoist period. Policies around this eugenics program involved bans on abortion, infanticide, contraception and information around contraception. This practice was started as policy during the Dictatorship of Primo de Rivera, discontinued by the Second Republic and then picked up again as a national level policy by Francoists. Anything that was viewed by the state as interfering with women's reproduction activities and increasing the size of the Spanish population size were viewed as being in opposition to the state. All activities that stopped this began to become defined by the regime as crimes.

Because of state eugenics policies, women were unable to define their own sexuality in the Francoist period. Instead, the regime imposed its own strict and narrow definition of female sexuality upon women. They said that women were to be "submissive, devoted and devout". Femininity in the Francoist period is defined as submission and spirit of sacrifice. Morality in Spain rested upon women, with their bodies being the keepers of the country's well-being through moral behavior. Controlling women's sexuality was about the belief that doing so would make Spain a morally superior country.

Women were defined in Francoist Spain exclusively around the reproductive needs of the state, with women's sexuality only being allowed to expressed in that context. Consequently, women's sexuality was not a consideration in the Franco period. Women's sexuality was relegated in society exclusively to the realm of medicine, and only allowed to be discussed in medical literature by male doctors. Female adultery, homosexuality, masturbation and premarital sex were all considered by the regime to be forms of sexual aberrations. As much as the regime tried to control women's sexuality in the 1940s, it proved difficult to actually do so. A 1944 edition of Semanario de la SF said, "The life of every woman, despite what she may pretend, is nothing but a continuous desire to find somebody to whom she can succumb. Voluntary dependency, the offering of every minute, every desire and illusion is the most beautiful thing, because it implies the cleaning away of all the bad germs—vanity, selfishness, frivolity—by love." Women who violated the state imposed definitions of female sexuality put themselves at tremendous risk. This included being labeled a prostitute or sent away to a facility to try to change them into more moral women.

Prisons were used as places to try to reshape women's sexuality. Parents in the 1950s and 1960s exerted strong control over their daughters' sexuality.

Women's magazines were co-opted by the state to pressure women to conform to the state's definition of sexuality. The magazine told women how they should behave in the context of married life. Consultorio de Elana Francis was a radio program that aired in Spain between 1947 and 1984, where women were able to ask for advice on problems they had. Issues of marital gender violence often came up. The show was created by Angela Castells, a member of Sección Feminina, Patronato de Protección de la Mujer and Spanish League against Public Immorality, Spain's immorality police. It served a similar role, up to and including telling married women that they deserved to be raped or physically by their husbands and that these women should repent and stay with their abusers.

Student protests in the 1960s began to be a period where women's sexual liberation started to happen on university campuses. On the whole, these protests though were much more liberating for men and male sexuality than women, who might accompany men along as part of demonstration. "Sexuality is not motherhood" (Spanish: Sexualidad no es maternidad) became a slogan of many feminists and feminists organizations by the end of 1975.

Starting in the 1970s, the feminist movement has started a movement to give women control over their own bodies and reproductive capacity, something which they believed men had historically controlled through coercion and violence. Sexuality is covered in this context using a variety of political and cultural concepts, including abortion, gender roles, violence against women, reproductive health, contraceptives, family planning, sexual orientation and marriage. Sexuality is a private thing which requires the contradictory need to be discussed in a public political and legal context to insure that rights around sexuality cannot be ignored or separated from other aspects that can result in a loss of rights. Feminists have also pushed for a discussion and understanding of these issues and how they impact women's everyday lives.

The definitions of women's sexuality in the Francoist period are important for understanding the climate around women's sexuality in the 2010s, especially as it relates to macho behavior and women's expected responses to it.

=== Physical appearance and physique ===
In Francoist Spain, the female body was stripped of its physicality and made into a desexualized object. They existed only for utilitarian reasons only. They were things for use by the state to discover female moral and criminal transgressions. Despite Francoist invocations to desexualize women and transform them exclusively into mother figures, society still had idealized feminine forms that were often most visible in films of the era. In the earlier Franco period, this ideal feminine form was one with wide hips, prominent breasts and round faces. It would change, after the post war period, to involve women who were thinner by choice, as opposed to a result of starvation.

Physical education for women was often frowned upon by the regime. While exercise was viewed as important for preserving a women's ability to procreate and to avoid health problems, too much physical activity was frowned upon. Some sports like athletics were discouraged because participation in them was considered masculinizing.

Because of the support of sport for women in Spain through organizations like Sección Feminina, the ideal female body type was one that showed her strength. Attractive women were also much more likely to be flat chested. This notion of female beauty and body type was found in literature of the Francoist period. Because women's breasts were largely inaccessible to the male gaze as a result of clothing and cinematographic censorship, female beauty in the Francoist period often focused on legs and ankles. Agustina de Aragón was the first Spanish movie to feature a woman's naked breast. Released in 1950, the naked breast largely passed without comment as it was attached to a nursing mother, and breasts of nursing women were consider asexual.

Women themselves had contradictory desires over their own idealized form. On the one hand, women wanted to be slender, but on the other, they wanted prominent breasts and hips and to be voluptuous. Many of these women, no matter the contradiction in their beliefs around beauty, strove to maintain a beautiful external physical appearance for the purpose of finding a good husband. She wanted a body that was sexual, but that also signified she was caring and loving. At the same time, her thoughts around her own body had to be guarded as there were social consequences for appearing vain or coquettish. Good, wholesome, innocent and pure girls did not appear to give considerations for their body shape. Sección Feminina defines this for women, saying,

Is it good taste to exhibit the physical charms when you have a perfect body? It is not in good taste or good manners to display it blatantly; our education and our coquetry will agree to what extent discretion and decency allow us to reveal our charms.

=== Clothing and hair ===
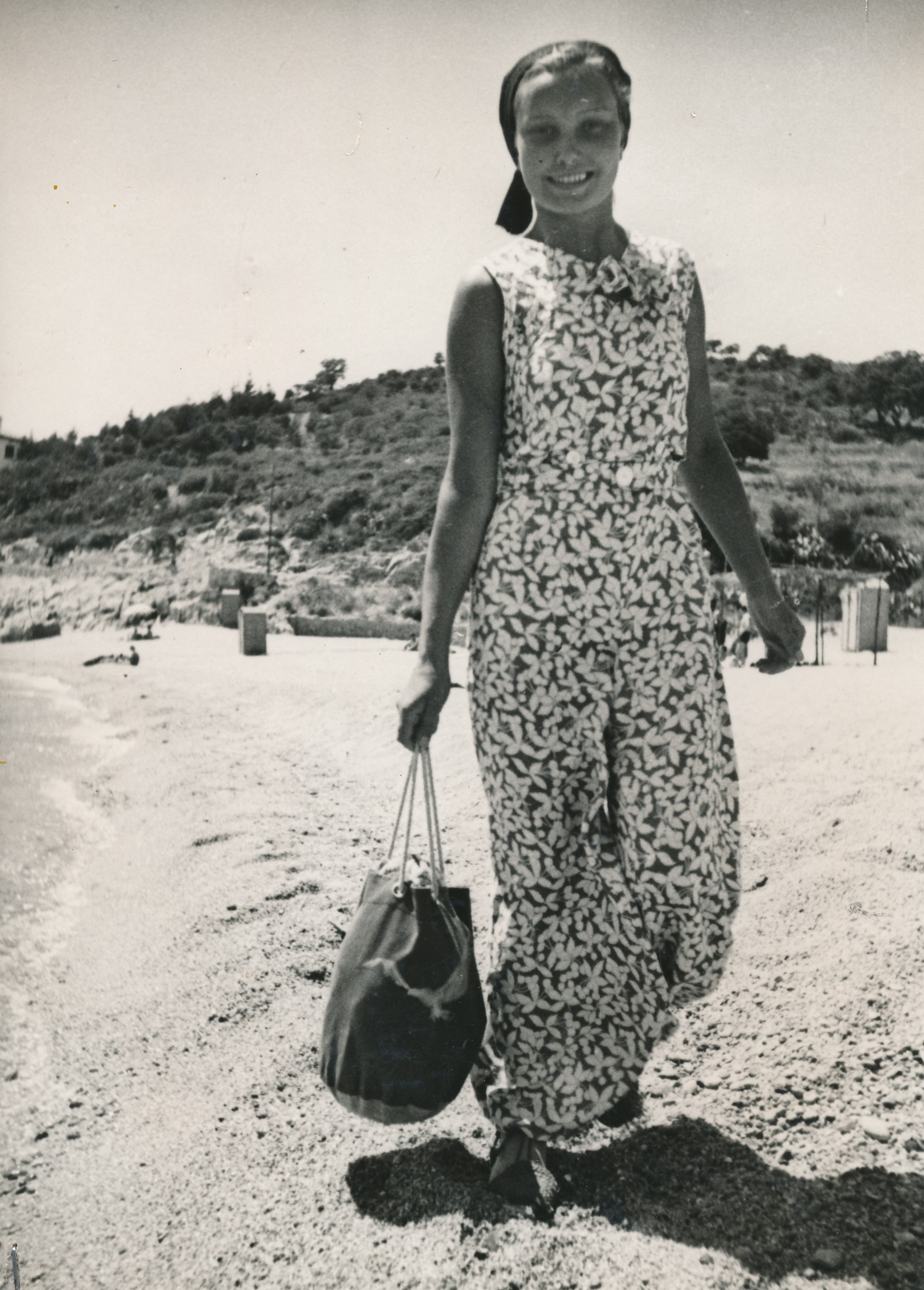
A woman on the beach in Costa Brava in 1959

Women were required to dress demurely, with long sleeves or elbow, no necklines, long and loose materials. Women were prohibited from wearing shorts or transparent materials. The regime purpose for this was to try to force women not to gain attention as a result of their bodies. Women "should be properly dressed, that is, with long sleeves or elbow, without necklines, with baggy skirts that will not indicate the details of the body nor they grab undue attention. The clothes could not be short and much less show through. Young women should not go out alone or be accompanied by men who were not from the family." Loose clothing was often worn to hide a woman's figure.

During the Franco regime, women were required to cover their hair in many contexts. This was to prevent them from showing their femininity and being sexual beings. Veils were quite common among conservative Catholic women even into the 1980s.

Women tried to fight these definitions in the 1960s by having short hair and wearing pants. In that same period, straight lines and geometric shapes began to play an important role in fashion, and more and more skin began to be exposed.

=== Virginity ===
Female sexuality as defined by the regime involved the woman being the property of one man. As a result, virginity was important, and women were expected to remain virgins until they married. Girls were taught that their virginity was the most precious gift they had that they could give to a future husband. A girl losing her virginity outside of marriage was a moral crime. If a girl lost her virginity before she got married, her whole family could be disgraced. In order for some women who became pregnant to maintain the illusion of being virgins, they had clandestine abortions or committed infanticide. Some girls who found themselves pregnant and not married were kicked out of their family homes by their parents and forced to live on the streets; this was done to save the honor of the rest of the family. Single-sex education was designed to prevent girls from losing their virginity.

Despite strong societal pressures during the 1940s for girls to remain virgins until marriage, 32.5% were, according to a survey by Dr. Serrano Vicens, not. At least 8% of girls also had engaged in simulated sex acts not involving penetration with boyfriends before they got married. This contrasted with their male counterparts who lost their virginity to prostitutes or maids and other women in employ in their households. Men faced their own issues as it related to female virgins. Society dictated that they demonstrate their virility and masculinity by having sex with many women. At the same time, they were also culturally charged with protecting women's virginity.

Teenaged girls could become wards of the state through Patronato de Proteccion a la Mujer. Starting in 1941 and lasting until 1985, girls were taken to centers run by nuns as part of a state goal to rehabilitate the "fallen". Girls put into these reformatories were subject to virginity tests conducted by nuns. This was done on a daily basis, with girls forced to sit on a hospital bed where a doctor would ask them if they were a virgin. After they said yes, the doctor would imply they were liars and then put a stick up a girl's vagina to check without her consent. Many girls became hysterical during this process.

=== Sexual orientation ===
Homosexuality was, according to the regime, a form of sexual aberration. Being a lesbian in this period was about being forced into the closet with no chance of escape. They hid their identities from family, friends, their church community and their employers. Homosexual women during the Franco period could only meet each other clandestinely, perpetuating a silencing of their voices and rendering them unintelligible to outsiders. The clandestine nature of their relationships rendered lesbians invisible and prone to having collective imagery about them negatively defined by the state and its apparatus. The need to constantly be alert to the potential of discovery of their orientation stressed out many lesbians. It could also lead to isolation, as they cut ties to groups who might discover they were lesbians. This included religious and social groups. Some lesbians could not deal with the pressures they faced and committed suicide.

Because of the Franco regime's beliefs about women, including an inability to understand lesbianism, there was an underground culture available for lesbian women. Where multiple men using public urinals was suspect, girls having parties without boys in attendance was viewed less circumspectly as it was assumed by many that they were being pure by not inviting boys. Their invisibility protected lesbians in ways that it did not protect men because many people believed lesbianism did not exist. Lesbians would often use code words, such as librarian or bookseller (Spanish: libreras), to identify one another. Younger lesbians might identify each other by asking, "Are you a comic?" (Spanish: ¿Eres tebeo?). Because beaches were gender segregated, it was often an easy place for lesbians to socialize. Lesbians created their own economic networks to insure their ability to survive. They also created their own spaces where they could feel free, including placed near Parallel and las Ramblas in Barcelona. Matilde Albarracín described their actions as they related to the regime and cultural attitudes of the time as, "So subversive."

There were arguments at the time over the way to be both a feminist and a lesbian. The lesbian political movement at the time largely concluded that lesbian sexuality "did not have to be soft or aggressive, nor follow any feminist or feminine pattern." Some radical feminists in the immediate transition period would choose lesbianism as a form of exerting control over their sexuality that had been repressed by the Franco regime.

Despite gay men being the more visible homosexuals in the Franco and transition period, women writers would be at the forefront of normalizing homosexuality in literature for the average Spanish reader in the final Franco years and first years of the transition. Women writers like Ester Tusquets were the first to break taboo subjects like female desire. Political feminism that saw lesbianism as a natural endpoint for women began to become a bigger theme in some feminist works of this period.

=== Sex ===
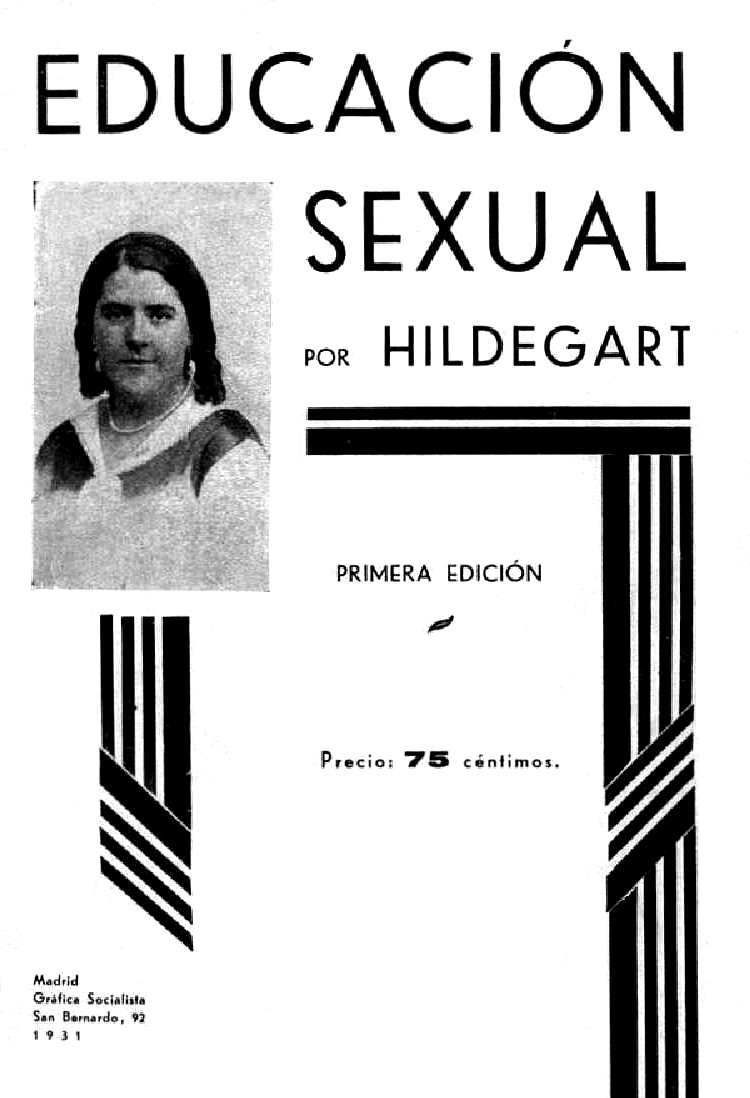
Educación Sexual by Hildegart Rodríguez Carballeira. This Spanish sex education guide was published in 1931 in Madrid, eight years before Francoism.

Sex was meant only for procreation. Girls were taught they were intellectually inferior to men, and that their role was to stay home and become mothers. Education was single gender to prevent giving girls ideas about sex with males. Despite sex for women for any purpose other than procreation being strongly condemned and prostitution being illegal after 1956, prostitution was nonetheless tolerated in support of male sexuality that was defined around their virility. Adultery was a form of sexual aberration. Sex before marriage was strongly condemned, but as a moral issue, not a criminal one. Violating this moral code, especially during the 1940s, could have strong negative consequences for women including being abandoned by their families. Women were constantly being watched and had to behave in circumspect ways to ensure their appearance of decency was maintained. For many women and girls, this could mean that no matter her own desires, she could not take the initiative if she found a man that she found interesting.

Some women were taught that their husbands should never see them naked. Conservative married Catholic women would only have sex with their husbands at night in the dark while clothed in their pajamas.

Women's sexual pleasure was not high on the list of their male partner's priorities when engaging in pre-marital. In the 1940s, only 2% of women knew about cunnilingus, while 2.8% had given their partners fellatio.

By the mid-1960s, sexual activity involving non-penetrative sex was a common feature in middle class heterosexual courtship. In premarital sexual caressing, only 40% of the caressing was done to women's genitals. Carles Carreras i Verdaguer said of the leftist and communist culture found in places like Barcelona and Ibiza in 1968, "It was time for the breaking of the family model and, for example, we did not have our vocabulary. People said 'my partner', but well ... The model was broken, even the communes tried to work without models and it was time to 'fuck, fuck, the world is going to end'." These attitudes were not common in student society. Rather, they represented a limited sexual vanguard in Spain's more liberal and counterculture places. Women in PCE were pressured to have sex in the mid-1960s and 1970s to prove that they were free. There was an element of lack of choice if they wanted to prove their leftist credentials. According to Merche Comalleba, "The PCE militants told us that we were some sluts, some whores, that our goals were neither feminist nor political nor anything". As a result of the rebound effect following the end of the dictatorship, Spanish women are more sexually liberated than some of their European counterparts.

During the mid-1970s, the Catholic Church preached that no physical barrier should be present during sex, and that even post-coital washes were problematic as they interfered with the primary goal of sex being conception. The Catholic Church taught the only acceptable reproductive control methods were abstinence and the rhythm method.

In May 1978, adultery was eliminated as a criminal offense in Spain's penal code. Definitions of abandonment were also changed, as they were not consistent for both sexes with women previously only being able to claim abandonment if her husband forced his wife to support his mistress while they were living in the same house. On 7 October 1978, the law was changed to decriminalize the sale of contraceptives, along with information on how to use them.

=== Orgasms ===
Women's sexuality said pleasure was not important and they had no right to it. Galician feminist Tensi Álvarez said of this, "It's very difficult, from the perspective of a young girl, to see what Francoism was. The woman had a little less than breeding function and satisfying male sexual needs. My generation was educated in obedience; we did not even have the right to orgasm or pleasure." Women who had pleasure during sex were often labeled whores and prostitutes, either in a real sense or in a metaphorical sense. The regime claimed that if a woman had an orgasm; it was an insult to her husband. Women who had orgasms were often told to go to church and confess this as a sin.

Complutense University of Madrid rector José Botella Llusiá said,

There are many women, mothers of numerous children, who confess they have not noticed more than very rarely, and some have never noticed anything, sexual pleasure, and this however, does not frustrate them, because women, although they say otherwise, what she looks for in a man is motherhood ... I have come to think that the woman is physiologically frigid, and even the excitement of the libido in the woman is a masculine character, and that it is not the female women who have for the opposite sex a greater attraction, but on the contrary.

A report published by José Antonio Valverde and Adolfo Abril said,

We can estimate female sexual dissatisfaction between 74% and 78%. This is very clear, that every hundred Spaniards with sexual activity usually within marriage, seventy-six do not find satisfaction; out of every hundred, seventy-six do not reach orgasm and, on many occasions, they have not even known it.

=== Masturbation ===
The subject of female masturbation was taboo. Masturbation was a sexual aberration. Masturbation could manifest itself as a physical or mental illness. Father García Figar said of the effects of masturbation,

Organic malnutrition. Body weakness. General anemia. Dental cavities. Slack legs. Sweat on the hands. Large pressure in the chest. Neck and back pain. Laziness and reluctance to work and even the impossibility of doing it. Shortening of sexual life, impossible to rescue later. Loss of attraction for the opposite sex and disgust for marriage. Sperm sterility. Null. Retentive. Darkness in the understanding. Obsessions and ravings. Weak will. Inability to sacrifice. Animal hobbies.

To prevent girls from masturbating while at boarding schools, staff would come into rooms to check that their hands were not under their blankets during the night. Some parents forbid their children from putting their hands in their pockets to prevent them from masturbating. Energy and purity by Tihamer Toth was a regime sanctioned novel that gave advice on how to avoid masturbation.

=== Abortion ===
On 24 January 1941, abortion was formally made a crime against the state by Franco. It had already been a crime based on the Código Penal de 1932. Doctors who performed abortions could be given sentences of between 6 years and 1 day to 14 years and 8 months in prison, along with fines between 2,500 and 50,000 pesetas. Doctors would lose any professional qualifications they had for a period of 10 to 20 years. Pharmacists or anyone in their employ who gave any substance or medicine that would be considered abortive could face the loss of their professional qualifications for five to ten years and fines of between 1,000 and 25,000 pesetas. Any doctor, midwife or other medical practitioner who observed an abortion was required by law to report it to the authorities. Failure to do so would result in a fine. At the same time, any sale of materials used for the purpose of contraception or promoting their usage could be imprisoned for between 1 month and 1 day to 2 months. Sex education was also banned, with punishments attached for teaching it. Pregnant women in prison in the early Franco period were beaten badly, often with the intention of causing an abortion.

The Franco government found an ally in their anti-abortion beliefs and practices in the Roman Catholic Church. Those within the Catholic Church wrote in support of the law, with Father Jaime Pujiula, Professor of the Colegio Máximo de San Ignacio de Sarriá and member of the Royal Academies of Sciences of Madrid and Medicine of Barcelona. saying, "The fruit that is lost criminally would be perhaps the most robust man, the healthiest, the most intelligent to raise the same society or to renew it or print new directions and directions." It is also an attack against population problems. of society and Eugenics, not only the women who cause the abortion, but the perverse midwives and doctors conspired with them to perpetrate the crime for the vile spirit of profit are responsible before God, before society and before the Eugenics. "

Women could and did go to prison for having abortions. During the 1940s in Almería, 9% of female prisoners were there because they had abortions, had committed infanticide or abandoned their children. This compared to 20.45% who were in prison for sexual offenses that mostly included prostitution, and 4.9% who were in prison for crimes against authority. The remaining prisoners were there for other offenses, like coercion, crimes against religion, weapons possession or having a false identity.

=== Contraceptives and family planning ===
Condoms were illegal during almost the whole of the Franco regime. While they were available in Spain, they were also almost impossible to come by. Some pharmacies did clandestinely sell them alongside diaphragms. Because of their connections to avoiding men spreading venereal disease, condoms were often associated with prostitution. Consequently, buying contraceptives would often be dependent on men to acquire them on behalf of their partners. Women were embarrassed to buy them. Most couples practicing family planning used coitus interruptus during the 1940s and 1950s. The Catholic Church in this period allowed couples to use the rhythm method. As American culture began to influence Spain more during the mid-1950s, Spaniards began to adopt more American birth control methods. By 1965, even most Spanish Catholics thought birth control was a reasonable option to control the number of children women had. 51.5% of Spanish Catholics believed that the rhythm method was ineffective. Even Spanish doctors agreed that birth control was important in family planning, even if 24% of them were generally opposed to birth control.

Prohibitions against the sale of contraception in Andalusia in the 1950s, 1960s and 1970s were largely ineffective as women had various means to try to limit the number of children they had. This was especially true for women engaging in sex outside of marriage at a time when that practice, along with having children when single, were highly condemned by the government. Women were willing to take risks to have sex for pleasure by using some form of birth control. In 1966, the first man was convicted in Spain for selling contraceptives. He was also charged with causing a public scandal. Because midwives appeared to be so frequently involved in sharing knowledge about abortion and contraceptives and performing abortions, the male led scientific community in Spain tried to marginalize these women. Professionalization in medicine would help to further relegate the importance of midwives in Spain. Further attempts to dislodge midwives from the birthing process included accusing them of witchcraft and quackery, trying to make them appear unscientific. This was all part of a medical and eugenic science driven effort to reduce the number of abortions in Spain.

Despite being contraception being illegal, by the mid-1960s, Spanish women had access to the contraceptive pill. It was first sold on the commercial market in the country in 1964, where Anovial 21 de Productos Quimicos Schering was also heavily advertised. Women could be prescribed the pill by their doctors if they were married and could make a case that they had a gynecological problem which the pill could fix, but this reason could not be a desire to avoid being pregnant. Its usage was largely only allowed for the regulation of a woman's period. Many married women found it difficult to get prescriptions from their doctors, having only more marginal luck when they sought out private practitioners. Consequently, most of the women who were on the pill were mostly married upper-middle class women. In 1970, 2 million units of the pill were sold in Spain. By 1975, official estimates suggested half a million Spanish women were on the pill. The media, both general and specialized, covered the pill, where it was known as an anovulatory treatment. Its introduction in Spain allowed women's sexuality to be discussed for the first time, especially in medical and religious publications and more generally in women's publications. Despite this, the most popular method in the 1960s was coitus interruptus.

At the time of Franco's death, almost all the laws related to female sexuality were still intact, including prohibitions on the use of contraceptives.

=== Rape and gender violence ===
Rape and gender violence was a problem that was a result of Nationalist attitudes developed during the Spanish Civil War. Sexual violence was common on the part of Nationalist forces and their allies during the Civil War. Falangist rearguard troops would rape and murder women in cemeteries, hospitals, farmhouses, and prisons. They would rape, torture and murder Socialists, young girls, nurses and milicianas. Regular Nationalists soldiers engaged in similar patterns of rape, torture and murder in places like Maials, Callus and Cantalpino. Moroccan Foreign Legionaries were used to commit rape against women to create terror among local populaces. Women in prison were not safe either; they were also raped, often facing death if they failed to have sex with their captors. The exact extent of the problem will likely never be known as there was less record keeping around women, and quantification attempts have largely resulted in the erasure of women's history.

After the Civil War ended, Spanish men returned home to a culture that insisted women were completely subservient to men, and where men were allowed to have sex with prostitutes and otherwise be promiscuous. Women were taught to be subservient and that their happiness was not important. This culture encouraged domestic violence by husbands towards wives, and it included rape. Laws made non-consensual sex illegal in some cases, but there was tremendous social pressure not to report this behavior. Women with Republican ties were often raped until at least the 1960s, with social acceptance of the practice. These women often tried to move to cities to become more anonymous. Prison was also not safe for women. They were raped and sexually harassed there too. Lidia Falcón O'Neill was one such victim in prison.

As a result of Franco's death in 1975 and the democratic transition starting, the first protest condemning violence against women was held in Barcelona in 1976. Age of consent laws changed two years later, along with laws about honesty. Men were also legally able to be considered rape victims. Divorce was legalized in 1981. Other legal reforms took place in 1983. Still, rape was not treated as a serious institutional problem inside Spain and victims had little recourse.

Historical memory laws in Spain have resulted in more attention about to the violence faced by women during the Spanish Civil War and the Francoist period. The Junta de Andalusia started offering women compensation for violence against them in 2010. Court cases also began to be explored against perpetrators of these crimes, with some action taking place in Spain but most of the attempts to prosecute taking place in Argentina.

=== Menstruation ===
Menstruation in the Francoist period was often a taboo subject. One woman related an experience about dealing with her period in this era as, "My grandmother bought me the new cotton panties and I put them in my school bag in case I got stained." Women often lacked information on their own physiology around menstrual cycles, pregnancy and birth. They had to learn on their own. One woman described this process during her teenaged years as,

Being in a town in Extremadura in the midst of Franco's repression in a town far from the capital, in one of the most backward regions of Spain, you can imagine! I read Bécquer, Machado, you read what I know! to Baroja! and you said, this world is not my world and what I'm living is not really what I need, you know, they are discoveries of mine, through literature I realized, I knew the importance of women, what I could to contribute the woman for the fact of being, that we created.

Another woman said about seeking information, "Because besides, I know ... the issue of taking your daughter to the gynecologist, it was unthinkable that my mother in my time took me to the gynecologist." One woman said of using a tampon, "The tampax was to hide it and hide the boxes because you are no longer a virgin. When I had the endometriosis they blamed the tampax, but come on, they can not be blamed because they themselves were ignorant, because it was a taboo subject, it had to be hidden and nothing was said." Another woman said of her experiences in the early 1970s, "Yes, I could not touch anything, I experienced it in the first person, it was an insane thing in that sense, there was no information or where to see it, it is not like now with the internet, I am 47 years old, the 70s were my puberty, my youth, and that is that there were no women's things in the municipal libraries either, and there was no way to document you, I remember going to the municipal library to see what organs I have, how they work ... and not There was not a book, but none, but the nuns did not know anything either, the things that we know is that, from pure experience, in that sense the first years, just like my mother, until later you inform yourself and good. ... that part you overcome the traumas as we overcome them all."

For religious women in the Francoist women, they did not go to church during their period. Women were strongly discouraged from participating in exercise activities when they were menstruating. Some women used menstruation as an excuse to avoid sex.

Women in prisons often had many issues around hygiene that were compounded when they during menstruation. Their jailers had little sympathy for the, and used it as just another way to humiliate prisoners.

As the pill became more widely used in Spain for regulating menstruation, some women had doctors who would fail to explain its contraceptive properties.

== Definition ==
The Conference on Population and Development (Cairo, 1994) and the Fourth World Conference on Women (Beijing) defined sexuality and reproductive rights as, "Rights of women and men to have control over their sexuality, to decide freely and responsibly without being subject to coercion, discrimination and violence; the right of all couples and individuals to freely and responsibly decide the number and spacing of their children and to have the information, education and the means to do so, as well as to reach the highest level of sexual and reproductive health."

The World Health Organization defined sexuality in 2006 as,

...a central aspect of being human throughout life encompasses sex, gender identities and roles, sexual orientation, eroticism, pleasure, intimacy and reproduction. Sexuality is experienced and expressed in thoughts, fantasies, desires, beliefs, attitudes, values, behaviours, practices, roles and relationships. While sexuality can include all of these dimensions, not all of them are always experienced or expressed. Sexuality is influenced by the interaction of biological, psychological, social, economic, political, cultural, legal, historical, religious and spiritual factors.

The Glosario de términos sobre diversidad afectivo sexual published by Spain's Ministerio de Sanidad, Servicios Sociales e Igualdad in April 2018 defines sexuality as, "Human sexuality is a central aspect of the human being present throughout his life. It covers sex, identities and gender roles, eroticism, pleasure, intimacy, reproduction and sexual orientation. It is lived and expressed through thoughts, fantasies, desires, beliefs, attitudes, values, behaviors, practices, roles and interpersonal relationships. Sexuality can include all those dimensions, however, not all of them are experienced or expressed always. Sexuality is influenced by the interaction of biological, social, economic, political, cultural, ethical, legal, historical, religious and spiritual factors."
