= Thomas C. Leonard =

American economist

Thomas C. Leonard is an American historian of economics and scholarly authority on American economic life during the late 19th and early 20th centuries at Princeton.

He is perhaps best known for his book Illiberal Reformers: Race, Eugenics and American Economics in the Progressive Era. In 2017, the History of Economics Society awarded Illiberal Reformers the Joseph J. Spengler Prize for book of the year.

== Selected publications ==
- Leonard, T. C. (2005). Retrospectives: Eugenics and economics in the progressive era. Journal of Economic Perspectives, 19(4), 207–224.
- Leonard, T. C. (2016). Illiberal reformers. Princeton University Press.
- Klamer A, Leonard TC (1994) So what's an economic metaphor? In: Mirowski P (ed) Natural images in economic thought: markets read in tooth and claw, pp 20–51. Cambridge University Press, Cambridge New York
- Leonard, T. C. (2000). The very idea of applying economics: The modern minimum-wage controversy and its antecedents. History of Political Economy, 32(Suppl_1), 117–144.
