= Johann Joseph Jörger =

Swiss psychiatrist and eugenicist (1860–1933)

- Born: October 21, 1860; Vals, Switzerland
- Died: August 31, 1933 (aged 72); Chur, Switzerland
- Occupation: Psychiatrist
- Known for: Founding director of the Waldhaus psychiatric clinic, Chur; eugenicist
- Spouse: Paulina Hubert (m. 1885)
- Children: 4, including Johann Benedikt Jörger and Paula Jörger

Johann Joseph Jörger (21 October 1860 – 31 August 1933) was a Swiss psychiatrist, founding director of the Waldhaus psychiatric clinic in Chur, and a prominent proponent of eugenics. His hereditary-biological research on Yenish families in Graubünden was used to legitimize the discrimination and persecution of the Yenish in 20th-century Switzerland, including forced child removals and sterilization.

== Life ==
Jörger was the only son of Johann Benedikt Jörger, a blacksmith and farmer, and Fidelia née Vieli, from Vals. After attending primary school in Vals and secondary school in Schwyz, he studied medicine at the University of Basel and the University of Zurich (1880–1884, doctorate at Basel in 1888). He worked as a physician in Andeer (for the village and its spa establishment) in 1885, then as assistant physician and deputy physician (1886–1891), and briefly as acting director (1889) of the Sankt Pirminsberg psychiatric clinic in Pfäfers.

In 1892, Jörger took over the direction of the newly founded Waldhaus psychiatric clinic in Chur, a post he held until 1930. He also participated in the founding of other institutions for people with mental illness, notably in Herisau (1908) and at the Justizvollzugsanstalt Realta (1919). In 1885 he married Paulina Hubert, from Vals, daughter of Johann Anton Hubert, a cook and baker. The couple had four children, among them Johann Benedikt Jörger, also a psychiatrist, and Paula Jörger, a teacher and feminist activist.

== Eugenic research and its consequences ==
As a psychiatrist, Jörger was particularly active in the field of eugenics. From the mid-1880s, he began compiling genealogies based on eugenics and racial biology concerning the Yenish of Graubünden. Drawing on these, he studied the cases of two families referred to by the pseudonyms "Zero" and "Markus"; his findings were published in 1919 under the title Psychiatrische Familiengeschichten by the German publisher Julius Springer-Verlag. In these texts, Jörger presented defamatory accounts of the alleged degeneration of these families, which he attempted to demonstrate "scientifically" across generations, relying chiefly on the theory of blastophthoria (damage to germ cells caused by alcohol) developed by Auguste Forel. He warned against the dangers of the spread of supposedly "inferior" genetic heritage and the financial burden placed on the public by the care of poor Yenish families.

Jörger's research in hereditary biology attracted wide interest beyond the field of psychiatry and served to "scientifically" legitimize the discrimination and persecution of the Yenish in the 20th century. Cantonal authorities and politicians in Graubünden drew on his writings to justify the introduction of the 1920 cantonal poor relief law, which provided for eugenic and coercive welfare measures against persons classified as "vagrants," including sterilization, prohibition of marriage, institutionalization, and child removal — the last of which Jörger was the first to advocate. The Psychiatrische Familiengeschichten served as the primary reference for the founding in 1926 by Pro Juventute of the "Kinder der Landstrasse" scheme. Its founder and director, Alfred Siegfried, repeatedly cited Jörger's work to justify the systematic dismantling of Yenish families and the placement of children in foster families or institutions (reform schools). Jörger's theories were also taken up in Nazi Germany, notably by Ernst Rüdin, who in 1933 participated in drafting the Law for the Prevention of Hereditary Disease in Posterity (the sterilization law).

== Fiction ==
Jörger wrote a series of short stories and novels about rural farm life and childhood, mostly in the Walser German dialect of his home village. Urchigi Lüt (1918) was a collection of several stories that had previously been published in newspapers and magazines. They were published in book form at the urging of the Schiers parish priest Benedikt Hartmann and Albert Bachmann, the editor-in-chief of the Schweizerisches Idiotikon, in which Jörger's writings in the local dialect are analysed. The 1920 novel Der hellig Garta depicts the submersion of the mountain village of Zervreila (in the municipality of Vals) beneath a reservoir. In 1926, the novel Die letzte Schattenmauer, written in standard German, was published; it deals with the fate and downfall of a proud farming family. In 1931, Jörger recorded his dialect story Eine bequeme Hochzeit on a record for the Berliner Phonogramm-Archiv. According to Albert Bachmann, Jörger's dialect writings are "among the finest […] that our rich dialect literature has to offer in works of this kind. […] There are true masterpieces of folk storytelling amongst them."

== Other activities ==
Jörger was a member of various professional associations, including the Swiss Society of Psychiatry, the Public Utility Society of the Canton of Graubünden, and the Swiss Alpine Club (SAC). He also wrote literary texts in the Vals dialect, in particular Urchigi Lüt (1918) and Dr hellig Garta (1920).

After Jörger's departure, his successor as director of Waldhaus, Gottlob Pflugfelder, continued in the 1950s to compile the documentation Jörger had begun and developed, under the pejorative name Sippenarchiv ("clan archive"), genealogical archives known as the Waldhaus Psychiatric Clinic Genealogical Archives.

== Bibliography ==
=== Works ===
- Jörger, Johann Joseph: Urchigi Lüt. Geschichten im Valserdialekte, 1918.
- Jörger, Johann Joseph: Psychiatrische Familiengeschichten, 1919.
- Jörger, Johann Joseph: Dr hellig Garta. Geschichte im Valserdialekt, 1920 (2nd ed. 2021).
- Jörger, Johann Joseph: "Die Vagantenfrage", in: Der Armenpfleger, 22/2, 1925, pp. 17–21; 22/3, 1925, pp. 25–30; 22/4, 1925, pp. 33–36.

=== Sources ===
- Jörger, Paula: "Johann Joseph Jörger, 1860–1933", in: Bedeutende Bündner aus fünf Jahrhunderten, vol. 2, 1970, pp. 321–332.

=== Secondary literature ===
- Mornaghini-Zweidler, Liliana: Der Psychiater Johann Joseph Jörger (1860–1933), 1975.
- Huonker, Thomas: Fahrendes Volk – verfolgt und verfemt. Jenische Lebensläufe, 1987, pp. 230–241.
- Galle, Sara: Kindswegnahmen. Das «Hilfswerk für die Kinder der Landstrasse» der Stiftung Pro Juventute im Kontext der schweizerischen Jugendfürsorge, 2016.
- Aliesch, Carmen: "Das Waldhaus, die Eugenik und die Jenischen im 20. Jahrhundert: Eine Untersuchung des sogenannten 'Sippenarchivs' der Psychiatrischen Klinik Waldhaus", in: Jahrbuch Historische Gesellschaft Graubünden, 147, 2017, pp. 101–144.
- Rietmann, Tanja: Fürsorgerische Zwangsmassnahmen. Anstaltsversorgungen, Fremdplatzierungen und Entmündigungen in Graubünden im 19. und 20. Jahrhundert, 2017.
- Gusset, Silas; Seglias, Loretta; Lengwiler, Martin: Versorgen, behandeln, pflegen. Geschichte der Psychiatrie in Graubünden, 2021.
