= Johann Benedikt Jörger =

Swiss psychiatrist and amateur playwright

- Born: August 16, 1886; Pfäfers, Switzerland
- Died: March 2, 1957 (aged 70); Chur, Switzerland
- Occupations: Psychiatrist, playwright, folklorist
- Known for: Director of Waldhaus Clinic, amateur theater, entomology

Johann Benedikt Jörger (16 August 1886 – 2 March 1957) was a Swiss psychiatrist, amateur playwright, folklorist, and entomologist from the canton of Graubünden. He directed the Waldhaus Clinic in Chur and made contributions to Swiss folk culture and natural history.

== Career ==
Jörger was born in Pfäfers and was the son of Johann Joseph Jörger. He remained unmarried throughout his life. After attending secondary school (Gymnasium) in Chur, he studied medicine at the universities of Basel, Florence, and Zurich, specializing in psychiatry and completing his doctorate in 1915.

He worked at the Rheinau psychiatric clinic and at the Burghölzli in Zurich, before joining the Waldhaus Clinic in Chur in 1918. Succeeding his father as director, he led the institution from 1930 to 1946. From 1947 to 1950, he served as interim director of the Sankt Pirminsberg institution in Pfäfers.

== Literary and cultural activities ==
In addition to numerous psychiatric publications, Jörger wrote two Christmas plays (1919, 1929) and around a dozen comedies, burlesque farces, and fairy-tale plays for amateur theater, some in the Chur dialect. He was also an art critic and was involved in heritage conservation and nature protection. As a folklorist, he participated actively in the movement for the preservation of Swiss traditional costumes, edited models for Graubünden cross-stitch patterns, and contributed to the planning of the historical pageant at the Swiss National Exhibition of 1939.

== Entomology ==
Jörger assembled a collection of 50,000 beetles (approximately 2,000 species, of which 500 were new records for the canton of Graubünden). The collection is held at the University of Basel.

== Bibliography ==
- Bündner Tagblatt, 9 March 1957
- Jahrbuch der Naturforschenden Gesellschaft von Graubünden, 87, 1957/1958, XIII–XXII (with bibliography)
