= Memorial to the Victims of National Socialist 'Euthanasia' Killings =

Memorial in Berlin, Germany

Memorial and Information Point for the Victims of National Socialist Euthanasia Killings
- Gedenk- und Informationsort für die Opfer der nationalsozialistischen "Euthanasie"-Morde
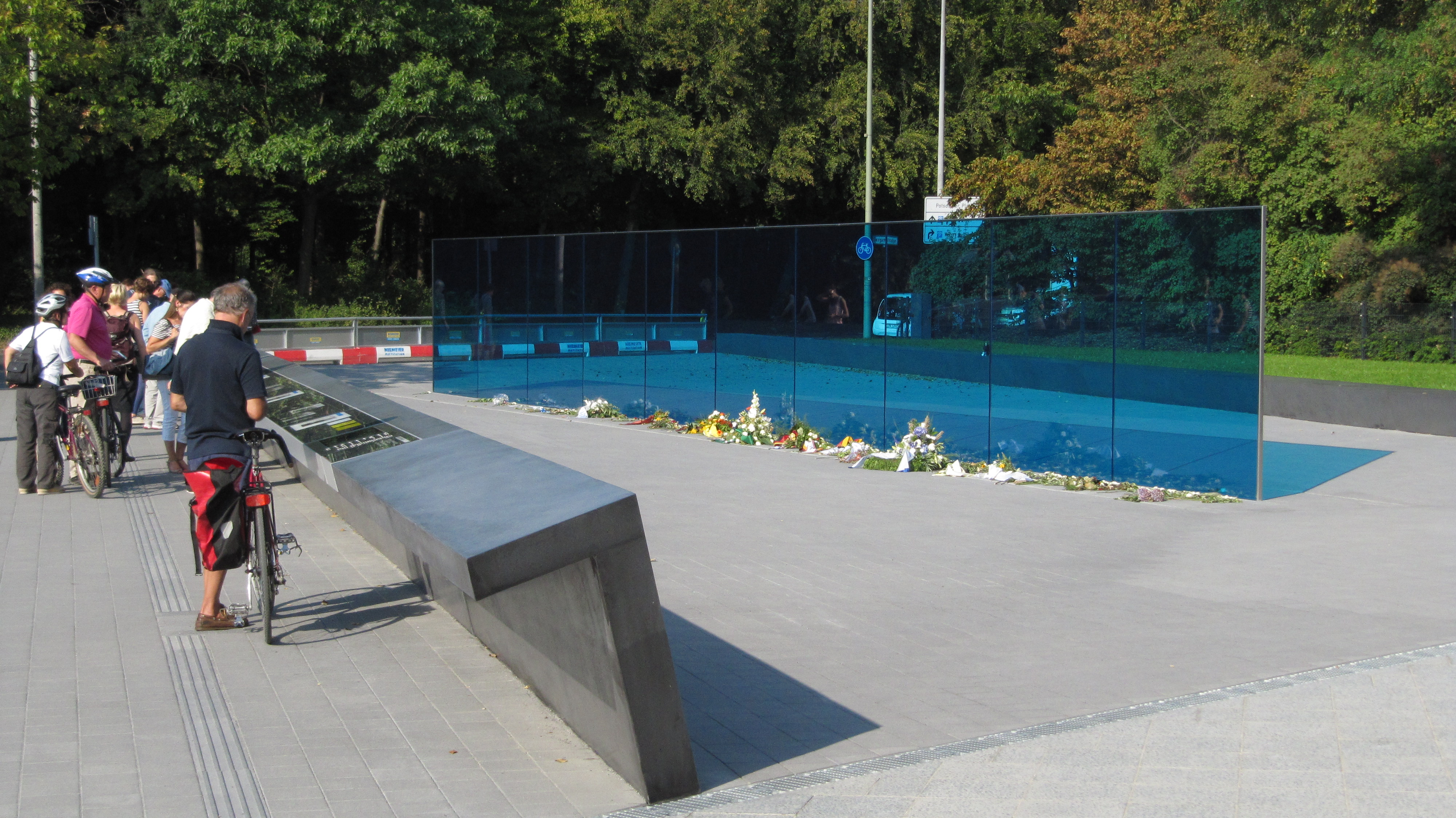
- The Memorial in 2014
- Interactive map of Memorial and Information Point for the Victims of National Socialist Euthanasia Killings
- Location: Berlin, Germany
- Coordinates: 52°30′38″N 13°22′10″E

The Memorial and Information Point for the Victims of National Socialist 'Euthanasia' Killings (German: Gedenk- und Informationsort für die Opfer der nationalsozialistischen "Euthanasie"-Morde) is a memorial in Berlin, Germany to the victims of Nazi Germany's state-sponsored involuntarily euthanasia program. Over 70,000 people were murdered between 1940–41 under official order of Aktion T4. Despite the program's technical cessation in August 1941, the killings continued in state-run institutions and care facilities until Germany's surrender in 1945. This amounted to a death toll of approximately 300,000.

== History ==
The targets of this genocide were those deemed to suffer from mental or physical illness. They were deemed as lesser beings by the Nazi party. The program fell in line with the ideas of eugenics and racial hygiene. Forced sterilizations were also methods used to target those with disabilities or illness under this Nazi program. The goal was to ensure that a new generation would have the most favorable genes, such as those inline with the ideals of the Aryan race. Only some of the doctors faced trials, such as those at Nuremberg, while most continued on with their jobs. This memorial brings awareness to the breadth of genocide committed during this time period.

Located at Tiergartenstrasse 4, 10785 Berlin, this memorial brings awareness to the atrocities that were planned there. During Nazi occupation, the headquarters for the Action T4 were located here. This area is also a special place for the memorial because it also coexists with other monuments, art installations, and information points to acknowledge the experiences of the people who died as a result of Action T4 legislature. The Curve sculpture, the Monument of the Grey Buses, and the Topography of Terror are just some of the memorials at Tiergartenstrasse. Berlin's Philharmonic is the only building on site that does not pay homage to the victims of euthanasia. This area has been reshaped to show the history of the location, while still allowing the city of Berlin to grow around it.

A contest was held by the state of Berlin to determine the design and the designer of the memorial. The winning design was crafted by architect Ursula Williams and landscape architects Nikolaus Koliusis and Heinz W. Hallmann. Their design incorporated at 24-meter wall made of blue glass set in concrete. The glass allows visitors to see through it as they sit on a concrete bench or peer through while gazing up from the information point. The memorial provides information about the history of the killings, how it is relevant today, and portraits of 10 victims. It was created to educate and allow visitors to reflect on the past it represents.

The German lower house of parliament (German; Deutscher Bundestag) voted on the creation of the monument in November 2011 (c). This then prompted the contest in Berlin and construction commenced once the winning team was selected for which the government contributed 500,000 Euros. After everything was finalized, it officially opened to the public on September 2, 2014 and is open 24 hours a day. With assistance from the government, the memorial became a reality.

The government held two important ceremonies to mark the progress of the memorial. The first ceremony was attended by the vice president of the lower house of German parliament – Wolfgang Thierse, government representative for the disabled – Hubert Hüppe, and Dilek Kolat Berlin's senator for integration. The officials were there to set the foundation stone for the monument. German minister for culture Monika Gruetters, Berlin mayor Klaus Wowereit, and two family members of victims were featured speakers during the second ceremony. This ceremony focused on the public unveiling of the monument. Gruetters shared that "every human life is worth living: that is the message sent out from this site," during her speech. The inauguration came to a close as guests placed flowers around the memorial.

The memorial was supported by select groups and departments who helped ensure its creation and success. These partners were found within the government and in private organizations. They found a "collaborative partner" in the Foundation Memorial to the Murdered Jews of Europe to help with planning and continue to be a part of the organization. The memorial additionally received government support from the Federal Commissioner for Department for Culture and Media, the mayor of Berlin, the Senate Chancellery (Cultural Affairs), and the Senate Department for Urban Development & the Environment. Funding also came from the Deutsche Forschungsgemeinschaft (DFG) and Professor Peter Funke, Vice President of DFG, represented them at the opening ceremony. Sigrid Falkenstein is one of the family members of victims who lobbied for the memorial. Gerrit Hohendork, specialist from the Technical University of Munich, also aided the project by doing research. It was a collaborative effort between multiple groups and people to lobby and support the monument dedicated to the euthanasia victims.

Particular German government officials have commented on the creation of the monument. Some of the officers advocated for the memorial in its early stages. "I personally welcome the notion of a memorial being erected in Berlin, as a symbol of recognition for the victims of Nazi euthanasia," Andreas Jürgens remarks. The former councilman is an activist for disability inclusion in Germany today. Bernd Neumann, Germany's State Minister for Culture, highlighted one of the goals of the memorial by stating that "educating people about the Nazis' crimes and honoring their victims remained an obligation for the country. Multiple German officials have commented on the memorial and what it represents. Deputy speaker of the German parliament, Ulla Schmidt, thinks that the memorial serves as "a worthy place to keep alive the memory of the some 300,000 disabled and ill people who were murdered." German chairman for the council for disabled persons, Adolf Bauer welcomed "this memorial greatly, as it will serve a means never to forget Nazi crimes committed against disabled people." The tone set by these officials, and their colleagues, arranged the way for the memorial to be created and sustained.

The German public has also openly reflected on the memorial. Some see the glass "as a symbol to inform people about the scope of the euthanasia murders." While others doubt the necessity of the memorial. A former history teacher remarked that she was "skeptical whether this is really a good idea, or just instrumentalizes the crimes of World War II in a suffering of yet another group." The memorial still provokes thought among the public, which is one of its goals as a representation of a very dark history.

The memorial stands as an information point and to remind people of the atrocities committed from 1940 to 1945. The dark past of the Nazi euthanasia program is highlighted in the installations at Tiergartenstrasse 4. It became possible with the help from multiple government departments and private institutions. There is still discussion among the German public about the purpose of the monument and its creation. The victims are commemorated in the creation of this monument. These people were the first to be systematically murdered by the Nazi party.
