= Karl Schakel =

American engineer and rancher (1921–2002)

- Born: October 20, 1921
- Died: September 10, 2002 (aged 80)

Karl Koett Schakel (October 20, 1921 - September 10, 2002) was an American engineer and rancher. He was also a director of the Pioneer Fund.

Schakel graduated from Purdue University with a degree in Aeronautical Engineering and was later a founder of a weapons systems and aeronautical engineering company. Later he was founder of a ranching-farming company operating in 12 countries on five continents.
