= Iron Fist Campaign =

The Iron Fist Campaign was a compulsory sterilization program conducted in the summer of 2010 by family planning officials in Puning, a county in Guangdong, China.

== Background ==
In 1979, the Chinese government introduced the one-child policy, which legally prevents couples from having more than one child, though there are some exemptions. The policy was created to address the country's overpopulation issue and economic problems.

By 2010, family planning efforts in Puning had diminished due to rapid economic growth in the area, as Guangdong had become the most successful manufacturing region in the People's Republic of China. However, local family planning officials were pressured to reduce births to meet the nationwide quotas. Chen Hong-Ping, the regional Communist Party chief, launched the Iron Fist Campaign in order to meet these demands.

== Campaign ==
In April 2010, a task force of approximately 600 local officials targeted 9,559 women who had violated the country's one-child policy. The women were required to report to government clinics to undergo sterilization. Family members of those women who had refused sterilization were detained indefinitely until the women complied with the procedure. In some cases, the women themselves were detained. Over the course of the 20-day campaign, 1,377 people were detained. From April to June, over 9,000 women were reported to have been sterilized as a result of the campaign.

== Criticism ==
News of the campaign did not make major headlines outside of local newspapers. He Yafu, an independent expert on family planning in China, suggested that the central government made an effort to conceal the results of the campaign because Chinese law specifically prohibited the means used to enforce it. Provincial officials have reported that the local Puning authorities will be investigated to determine the legality of their actions. Kate Allen of Amnesty International described the campaign as "appalling" and voiced her opinion that "authorities must condemn this practice immediately".
