= Willystine Goodsell =

Historian and feminist writer (1870–1962)

Willystine Goodsell (January 8, 1870 – May 31, 1962) was a historian and feminist writer who was a professor of history and philosophy at Teachers College, Columbia University. The AERA Women in Education SIG Award, founded in 1981, is also named in her honour.

== Life and career ==
Willystine Goodsell was born on January 8, 1870, in Wallingford, Connecticut, to Jacob Goodsell and Jennie Clark. She completed her education at Welch Training School, New Haven, Connecticut, and Teachers College, Columbia University. Her Masters dissertation, written in 1906, was entitled ‘The Relation of the Individual to Society in the Social Theories of Rousseau’. She completed her doctoral thesis The Conflict of Naturalism and Humanism under the supervision of John Dewey at Columbia. She later joined Teacher's College, Columbia as a faculty member, where she would remain for the next 31 years. She was the founder and first president of the Women's Faculty Club at Colombia and became a board member of the journal Social Frontier. Throughout her academic career she published work on a vast number of philosophical, anthropological, sociological and historical subjects. She was also a feminist, which became especially clear in her later works such as The Education of Women (1923), Pioneers of Women's Education in the United States (1931) and A History of Marriage and the Family (1935), in which she stated she wanted to “to reveal existing injustices and evils in the marriage relation”. In 1929 she noted the lack of academic jobs available to women, excepting women's colleges such as Wellesley College. Goodsell died on May 31, 1962, in New York City aged 92.

== Legacy ==
In 1981 the AERA Women in Education SIG Award funded by the Research on Women and Education Special Interest Group was named after Goodsell because she “dedicated her life to advancing opportunities and equal education for women”. The award is given yearly to an educator for supporting the education of women and girls through scholarship, activism or community building. Winners of the award include Julia Ballenger, a professor in the Department of Educational Leadership at A&M-Commerce (2022 winner) and Lynda Wiest, professor of Mathematics Education and Educational Equity at the University of Nevada (2020 winner).

== Selected publications ==
- Goodsell, Willystine. The conflict of Naturalism and Humanism. No. 33. Teachers college, Columbia university, 1910.
- Goodsell, Willystine. A History of the Family as a Social and Educational Institution. Macmillan, 1915.
- Goodsell, Willystine. The education of women: Its social background and its problems. Macmillan, 1923.
- Goodsell, Willystine. "Mary Adelaide Nutting: Educator and Builder." Teachers College Record 27, no. 5 (1925): 382-382.
- Goodsell, Willystine. Problems of the Family. Century Company, 1928.
- Goodsell, Willystine. "The Educational Opportunities of American Women—Theoretical and Actual." The Annals of the American Academy of Political and Social Science 143, no. 1 (1929): 1–13.
- Goodsell, Willystine. Pioneers of Women's Education in the United States: Emma Willard, Catherine Beecher, Mary Lyon. McGraw-Hill Book Company, Incorporated, 1931.
- Goodsell, Willystine. "The American Family in the Nineteenth Century." The Annals of the American Academy of Political and Social Science 160, no. 1 (1932): 13–22.
- Goodsell, Willystine. "The New Education As It Is: A Reply To Professor Kandel." Teachers College Record 34, no. 7 (1933): 539–551.
- Goodsell, Willystine. "The Size of Families of College and Non-College Women." American Journal of Sociology 41, no. 5 (1936): 585–597.
- Goodsell, Willystine. "Housing and the birth rate in Sweden." American Sociological Review 2, no. 6 (1937): 850–859.
- Goodsell, Willystine. "The New Eugenics and Education." Teachers College Record 1, no. 1 (1938): 113–117.
- Goodsell, Willystine. "Opportunities of American Women in Education and the Professions." Teachers College Record 6, no. 53 (1940): 214–216.
- Goodsell, Willystine. History of Marriage and the Family. (1945).
