= Hans Betzhold =

Chilean doctor and eugenicist

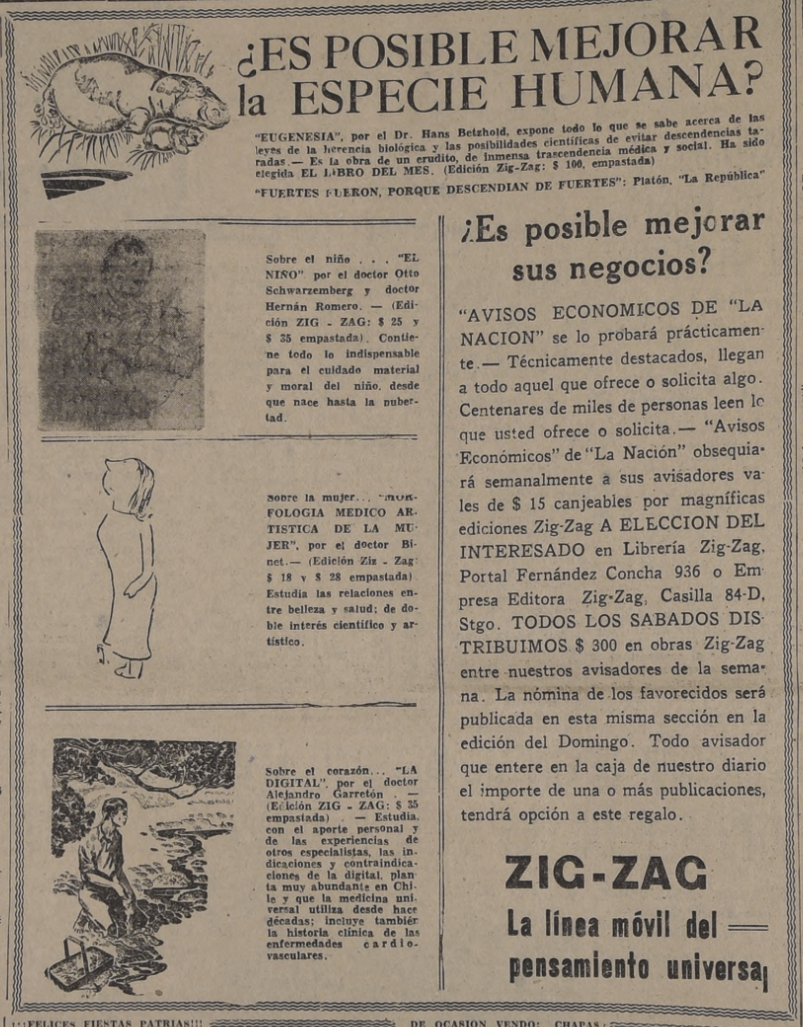
Betzhold's Eugenics became a best-seller. La Nación, 11 Sept. 1942

Hans Betzhold Hess was a Chilean doctor who advocated eugenics in his 1939 book Eugenesia (Eugenics). He was part of the Second Peruvian Conference on Eugenics held in Peru in 1943. He proposed a National Eugenics Department be established in Chile.

He advocated castration as a curative for sexual offenders and sought to eliminate vice and disease by creating a Chilean superman (superhombre) via eugenic selection. He advocated the use of sterilization to achieve "negative eugenics".

His book Eugenesia was published by Zig-Zag.
