= Compulsory sterilization of disabled people in the U.S. prison system =

Compulsory sterilization of disabled people in the U.S. prison system was permitted in the United States from 1907 to the 1960s, during which approximately 60,000 people were sterilized, two-thirds of these people being women. During this time, compulsory sterilization was motivated by eugenics. There is a lengthy history when it comes to compulsory sterilization in the United States and legislation allowing compulsory sterilization pertaining to developmentally disabled people, the U.S. prison system, and marginalized communities.

Compulsory sterilization is the unwanted and/or nonconsensual sterilization of both men and women. The main form of sterilization for women is tubal ligation and for men it is vasectomy.

== History and legislation ==
=== Indiana eugenics law ===
The first law concerning compulsory sterilization to be passed in the United States was in Indiana in 1907. The law was passed by Governor Frank J. Hanly, which permitted that certain individuals in state custody were to be mandatorily sterilized. This law was passed because of the belief held by Indiana authorities that "criminality, mental problems, and pauperism were hereditary". After the passage of this law, approximately thirty states followed suit and created compulsory sterilization laws based on the so-called scientific theory of eugenics.

=== Buck v. Bell (1927) ===
Buck v. Bell is a significant case in the eugenics movement in the United States because in this case the US Supreme Court allowed the forced sterilization of young woman Carrie Buck in the state of Virginia. Because of the ruling of this case, many women were forced to be sterilized as well. Buck, an inmate at the Virginia Colony for the Feebleminded, was deemed "feebleminded" and "sexually immoral" after becoming pregnant out of wedlock. After the birth of her child, Carrie Buck was sterilized. This case is so significant because from this, it was found by the Supreme Court that compulsory sterilization was within the police power of states, which therefore permitted the sterilization of both men and women. Still, primarily women like Carrie Buck were the victims of compulsory sterilization.

=== Patterns of compulsory sterilization following Buck v. Bell ===
Following the ruling of Buck v. Bell, it was found that nationwide, the amount of sterilizations performed rose dramatically, especially those performed on women. Prior to this ruling, sterilization cases between men and women were about the same. In the years 1928 to 1932, it was found that women were sterilized two times more than men were. As this pattern continued to progress and numbers continued to rise, it was found that approximately 30,000 sterilizations had been performed in the United States, with more than half of them taking place in California. States began to institute more programs concerning compulsory sterilization, and also began to better fund older programs concerning this practice.

=== Skinner v. Oklahoma (1942) ===
It was not until 1942 that there was another Supreme Court case, Skinner v. Oklahoma, that concerned the issue of compulsory sterilization, this time one that struck down Oklahoma's Criminal Sterilization Act of 1935. This statue stated that the state of Oklahoma was permitted to sterilize any person who had been convicted of three or more crimes "amounting to felonies involving moral turpitude." This was said to be a violation of the Equal Protection Clause of the Fourteenth Amendment, and the Supreme Court ruled in favor of this, therefore deeming the Oklahoma Criminal Sterilization Act of 1935 unconstitutional.

While this was progress for the repealing of the harsh compulsory sterilization laws nationwide and the Buck v. Bell ruling, it did not completely get rid of compulsory sterilization legislation in the United States. While states began to dissipate their sterilization laws, this case did not overturn Buck v. Bell and it did not completely cease cases of compulsory sterilization in the United States.

== Compulsory sterilization and developmentally disabled people ==
=== History ===
The compulsory sterilization of developmentally disabled people began in the late 19th century, even before the first state sterilization law was passed in 1907. From then on, the forced sterilizations of developmentally disabled people occurred in very high numbers until about the 1940s, when this number started to drop due to states beginning to repeal their laws allowing forced sterilization.

The theory of eugenics acted as the reasoning provided as to why developmentally disabled people were targeted and forcibly sterilized at high rates. These people were seen as a "danger to society" and the goal was to prevent them from reproducing, mostly because of the false pretenses held by society that mental disability was inheritable. One of the first instances recorded of compulsory sterilization in the United States took place at the Kansas State Asylum for Idiotic and Imbecile Youth. Beginning in 1894, Dr. Hoyt Pilcher authorized the sterilization of both boys and girls who lived in the facility. There were many other notable institutions that engaged in the same practices, some of which still operate today and mention their histories of sterilization abuse.

Buck v. Bell (1927) reinforced this by allowing the sterilization of Carrie Buck, who was deemed as "feeble minded similarly to her mother". In this ruling, it was stated by Justice Oliver Wendell Holmes Jr. that "society can prevent those who are manifestly unfit from continuing their kind ... three generations of imbeciles are enough". Many of these sterilizations took place in California, and it is thought that approximately 20,000 sterilizations of developmentally disabled people took place in California state homes and hospitals in the beginning half of the 20th century.

In recent years, much information has been uncovered concerning the forced sterilization of developmentally disabled people in the United States. It was found that developmentally disabled patients of state homes and hospitals were extremely vulnerable and taken advantage of by eugenicists and healthcare professionals and sterilized against their wills. It was also found that many physicians and social workers coerced their patients into being sterilized, with spoken consent not being required. In the present day, most states have repealed their sterilization laws and have passed other legislation to protect the human rights of their citizens.

=== Present-day struggles ===
Spanning from the early to the mid 20th century, approximately 60,000 people were forcibly sterilized in the United States. Based on the previous rulings of the Supreme Court, it is said that these 60,000 people had their fundamental human rights violated when they were forcibly sterilized. Many of these people demand redress and compensation, but have not been able to totally receive that. While state legislatures and governors in states where compulsory sterilizations were performed have issued apologies and have begun investigations into the cases of their citizen's forcible sterilizations, it has not completely amounted to victims getting proper compensation for their struggle. Because many states have repealed or amended their sterilization laws, cases brought about by victims do not fully hold up under present-day statutes. Further, some states' statutes of limitations prevent them from being able to assert claims of their forced sterilization.

== Compulsory sterilization in the United States prison system ==
=== History ===
Sterilization in the United States prison system dates back to the same origins as compulsory sterilization of developmentally disabled people. In the 1907 sterilization law passed by Indiana governor Frank J. Hanly, sterilization was made mandatory for "criminals, idiots, rapists, and imbeciles in state custody". From this, many Indiana men who were being held in Indiana State prisons were given vasectomies by Dr. Henry Sharp. Sharp even argued that "we owe it not only to ourselves, but to the future of our race and nation, to see that the defective and diseased do not multiply" when defending the sterilization procedures he performed. Following this, over 30 states enacted laws allowing sterilization of both developmentally disabled people and of criminals. In North Carolina, the heads of both state and penal institutions were given the right to sterilize, and oftentimes coerced people into forced sterilization by threatening to revoke social service benefits. As mentioned above, most states have repealed their legislation allowing sterilization, but forced sterilization still continues to be present, and a problem in the United States prison system.

=== Legislation ===
Sterilization in the U.S. prison system is something that is both incentivized and done as punishment to inmates. Oftentimes, people convicted of crimes involving child abuse are sentenced to compulsory sterilization, or offered lesser sentences if they agree to sterilization. One example of this was in 1993, Barbara and Ronald Gross were convicted of molesting their children and were both sentenced to ten years in prison. The Gross' were offered to be put on probation instead of serve their sentences by Judge Lynn Brown of Washington County, Tennessee. The circumstances of their probation included Barbara Gross agree to a tubal ligation.

There have been many instances of sentences being reduced, or even replaced by probation in which the circumstances require some sort of sterilization or forced birth control. Some cases of this include State v. Wilder, in which a young woman was convicted by a Florida court for smothering her newborn baby. She was sentenced to two years in prison and then ten years on probation, which required her to agree to not conceive during that time. While they told her she could not conceive, they did not say she had to be abstinent during that time period, therefore obliging her to undergo some sort of birth control procedure. Additionally, in multiple rulings concerning women convicted of child abuse, there have been requirements to either get a birth control implant and/or to not conceive during the probationary period. Some of these cases are People v. Johnson and State v. Carlton.

=== Present-day sterilization in the United States prison system ===
While sterilization laws have been repealed and new ones have been put in place to protect the bodily autonomy of people, there is still a major problem when it comes to the forced sterilization of women in the U.S. prison system. In California, it was found that over 100 women were unlawfully sterilized between the years of 2006 and 2010. Further, it was reported by the Center for Investigative Reporting that medical staffers at two California prisons with pregnant inmates targeted other inmates for sterilization who they thought would likely return to prison.

Another instance of modern-day compulsory sterilization was at the White County Jail in Tennessee. In 2016, Judge Sam Benningfield signed an order that permitted inmates at the White County Jail to get 30 days taken off their sentences if they underwent a birth control procedure. As of February 2017, approximately 32 women had received birth control implants and 38 men had agreed to getting vasectomies. This practice was ceased two years after it began and was said to be in violation of the 14th Amendment's Equal Protection and Due Process clauses. These are just some of the recent instances in which sterilization and incentivized birth control have been present in the U.S. Prison System.

== Sterilization in marginalized communities ==
=== Black women as targets ===
There is a long history when it comes to targeting marginalized women to be forcibly sterilized. While the prevalence of sterilization targeting developmentally disabled people stopped around the 1960s, members of marginalized communities are still the victims of forced sterilization. Relf v. Weinberger (1974) found that poor people were being forced to agree to sterilization when doctors would threaten to deny them welfare benefits and medical care. This case specifically involved Mary Alice and Minnie Relf, two black sisters who were 12-and 14-years-old. Their mother signed a consent form that was not explained to her or read prior, which ultimately led to the irreversible sterilization of her daughters. This is just one instance of the targeting of marginalized groups for forced sterilization. Further, the practice of "Mississippi appendectomies", which was another term for compulsory hysterectomies was practiced on women of color in the South at teaching hospitals as practice for medical students.

=== Recent allegations ===
More recently, allegations have surfaced that women at the Irwin County Detention Center in Georgia have been being transferred to a physician who has been performing forced hysterectomies on immigrant women without informed consent. When asked, the women stated that their procedures were not properly explained to them and they were also misinformed when told what procedures they would be undergoing. These claims are still being investigated, as whistleblower Dawn Wooten has just recently filed this complaint.

== See also ==
- Compulsory Sterilization
- Eugenics in the United States
