= François Lafitte =

French-born British political activist (1913–2002)

François Lafitte (3 August 1913—21 November 2002) was a French-born British political activist, social researcher, professor and abortion lobbyist. He was professor of social policy and administration at Birmingham University from 1958 to 1980 and chaired the British Pregnancy Advisory Service from 1968 to 1988.

In the 1930s, he was a member of the Communist Party of Great Britain, but left to join the elite think-tank, the Political and Economic Planning (PEP). As a member of the editorial board of The Times, Lafitte developed a close relationship with the Attlee ministry as an advocate of Keynsian economics and the welfare state. He played a significant role behind the scenes in lobbying for the legalisation of abortion in the United Kingdom, being associated with the Family Planning Association.

== Background ==
Lafitte's natural father was John Armistead Collier (1874—1947), an American anarchist political activist and his mother was Françoise Lafitte (better known as Françoise Delisle), a French anarchist and suffragette. In London, the two had formed a "free union" in 1912, that is to say an unlegalised marriage in line with anarchist philosophical principles. The relationship with short-lived and Lafitte was born in France, where he was given his mother's surname. His father returned to the United States and later married Phyllis Feningston (1896—1981), an American labour organiser and social worker. He was educated at the Collège Municipal in Maubeuge (near to the border with Belgium) and then St Olave's Grammar School in London. His mother had returned to London to live with Havelock Ellis, noted eugenicist and sexologist, who founded the British Society for the Study of Sex Psychology. According to The Guardian, "Throughout his life François sometimes indicated that he thought of himself as an adopted son of Havelock."

== Politics ==
After school, Lafitte was able to receive a privileged higher education at Worcester College, Oxford University. Although he had grown up in a radical political background anyway, he made his first independent forays into political activism by joining the October Club at Oxford University. The October Club; named for the Bolshevik's October Revolution in Russia; was a Marxist organisation and most of its members belonged to the Communist Party of Great Britain (which Lafitte himself joined too). Remaining a member of the Communist Party even after he had graduated, the Party sent him to Vienna and then he returned to England, working for the Communist Party in the East End of London. He did not gain much success during this time and so was sent to work within the Miners' International Federation as a research assistant by the Communist Party. He became disillusioned with the Party around the time of the Moscow trials, where various Old Bolsheviks were being prosecuted by the Soviet government for being part of a "Trotskyist terrorist conspiracy". He left the party in 1937.

Lafitte's real break came when his application to work as a research assistant at the Political and Economic Planning (PEP) think-tank was accepted. He was able to get this job due to his membership of the Eugenics Society and the connections of the wife of his late "adoptive father" (Edith Ellis). At the time Britain was at war with Nazi Germany and the Axis powers, as the Second World War was breaking out. Lafitte never had to serve in the British Armed Forces during the conflict due to medical exemption. The German invasion of the Netherlands sent the coalition government of the Churchill war ministry into a panic with the fear of a Nazi invasion of Britain and as part of the British anti-invasion preparations of the Second World War, "enemy aliens" were interned, as part of Churchill's "collar the lot" policy in regard to people in Britain originating from Axis nations. The government was unwilling to take any chances and considered that the profile of "political refugee" could be used as a cover for Axis agents in Britain. Lafitte, familiar with some of the far-left refugees from Austria from his Communist Party days, wrote the indignant work The Internment of Aliens (1940), criticising this approach, it was published as one of the Penguin Specials.

More generally, the Political and Economic Planning think-tank decided to plan the kind of society they would want in Britain after the War. They wanted to redesign the health and social services along state-led Keynesian lines and introduce a welfare state. The Common Wealth Party existed as a ginger-group promoting their ideas, essentially to pressure the Labour Party, while remaining independent of the Churchill-led coalition government: they had 5 MPs elected during the war. Lafitte himself published a work approaching the topic, Britain’s Way to Social Security (1945). He chaired a number of PEP research groups, including the health service (1943 until 1946) and housing policy (1948 until 1951). Lafitte was invited to join the editorial staff of The Times newspaper in 1943, having already written two leads. He worked for The Times as a special contributor and leader writer on social issues, putting across the agenda of the PEP, until 1959. This role allowed him a significant amount of influence, especially with the election of the Labour Party to power under the Attlee ministry (he developed a strong relationship with the government) and this allowed him to write informed articles about the development of the National Health Service. Lafitte bragged that a clause in the National Insurance Act 1946 could be called The Times clause, because it was lifted word-for-word from a piece he authored in The Times.

== Abortion ==
With the Conservatives keeping the welfare state in place after the government changed, Lafitte sought out new challenges and was appointed to the University of Birmingham in 1958. He was the dean of his faculty for three years. During this time, he stopped writing about the topics he was best known for and started to focus almost exclusively on birth control and abortion. The Family Planning Association (FPA) appointed him as chair of a working-party to publish a report and in 1963, Family Planning in the Sixties was published. Lafitte had touched on the subject briefly in his PEP days, but for the last decades of his career, this topic would become what he is best known for. He played a significant role behind the scenes in lobbying for the legalisation of abortion in the United Kingdom and what would become the Abortion Act 1967. He chaired the British Pregnancy Advisory Service (BPAS) from 1968 to 1988. Lafitte had been a founding member of BPAS when it was known as the Birmingham Pregnancy Advisory Service, along with the sexologist Martin Cole and Nan Smith.

== Personal life ==
François Lafitte married Eileen Saville in 1939 and had only one child together, Nicholas Lafitte, who died by suicide in his late 20s. The couple remained together for the rest of their lives, with Eileen dying in 1996.

== Bibliography ==
- The Internment of Aliens (1940)
- Britain’s Way to Social Security (1945)
- Family Planning in the Sixties (1964)
