= Illiberal Reformers =

2016 book by Thomas C. Leonard

- Author: Thomas C. Leonard
- Language: English
- Subject: Economic History
- Published: 2016
- Publication place: United States
- Media type: Print
- Pages: 233
- ISBN: 978-0-691-16959-0

Illiberal Reformers: Race, Eugenics, and American Economics in the Progressive Era is a book written by Thomas C. Leonard and published in 2016 by the Princeton University press which reevaluates several leading figures of the progressive era of American economics, and points out that many of the progressives of the late 19th and early 20th century who created policies such as minimum wage and maximum-hours laws, workmen’s compensation, progressive income taxes and many others had beliefs rooted in Darwinism, racial science, and eugenics, revealing a dark underside to the economic reformers often considered by history to be the altruists in the story of American economic progression.

== Overview ==
Illiberal Reformers begins with the history of the Gilded Age and the Progressive Era, discussing how the economy shifted from laissez-faire economics to what has come to be called progressivism. Progressivism, by Leonard's definition, is guided by the following core principles "First, modern government should be guided by science and not politics; and second an industrialized economy should be supervised, regulated, and investigated by the visible hand of a modern administrative state." Leonard details the three "act" process of the rise of progressive economics, beginning with higher education leading to the birth of economists, social scientist, as well as the new business of muckraking journalism. The second act in the rise of the progressives was the economic progressives convincing the American people and leaders that change was needed and that laissez-faire was neither economically nor socially justifiable. The final act in the rise of the progressives is that of the policy that came into place; this includes fixed minimum wage, mandatory public schooling, banning of child labor, maximum hours and many others.

The second part of Illiberal Reformers focuses on the untold part of the story of the rise of the progressives: the fact that the labor reform created by these progressives often sought to exclude immigrants, the disabled, women, and African American workers from the American workforce, which Leonard explains through several primary sources of the era.

== Reception ==
In his review for The New Republic, journalist and critic Malcolm Harris wrote that "conservatives can find a lot to like in Leonard's research, and at times it feels like a serious, credentialed version of Jonah Goldberg's screed Liberal Fascism." He concurs with Leonard that "[i]n the early twentieth century, progressives displayed an open contempt for individual rights," and that "[i]t's impossible to understand early twentieth-century progressives without eugenics." However, he concludes that "[i]t's difficult to suss out exactly what the lessons of Illiberal Reformers are for our present moment," because "[c]ontemporary progressives probably wouldn't recognize themselves in their predecessors except as through a Fox News funhouse mirror," and given the book's case, "there's no good guy left in the history book."

In a The New York Times review also covering Imbeciles by Adam Cohen, historian David Oshinsky wrote that the book is a "slim but vital account of the perils of intellectual arrogance in dealing with explosive social issues," noting that according to Leonard, "elite progressives gave respectable cover to the worst prejudices of the era—not to rabble-rouse, but because they believed them to be true."

Reviewing the book in the Journal of Economic Literature, economist Marshall I. Steinbaum and historian Bernard Weisberger wrote that it consists of "not intellectual history so much as motivated myth making," issuing "sweeping statements about what 'the progressives' believed, festooned with cherry-picked quotes and out-of-context examples..." They contend that the "decidedly problematic," "reactionary" views that Leonard ascribes to progressive economists were "common to a broad swath of the intellectual elite of that era," and that if they still hold any influence today, "it is rather though the intellectual descendants of the progressives' opponents, the expositors of laissez-faire..." They further argue that the progressives "contributed to the strengthening and improvement of American democracy" through initiatives such as worker's comp and food and drug regulation, and that "the real target of Leonard's book is this legacy, not the legacy of exclusion, eugenics, racism, and xenophobia."
