= Antonio Vallejo-Nájera =

Spanish psychiatrist (1889–1960)

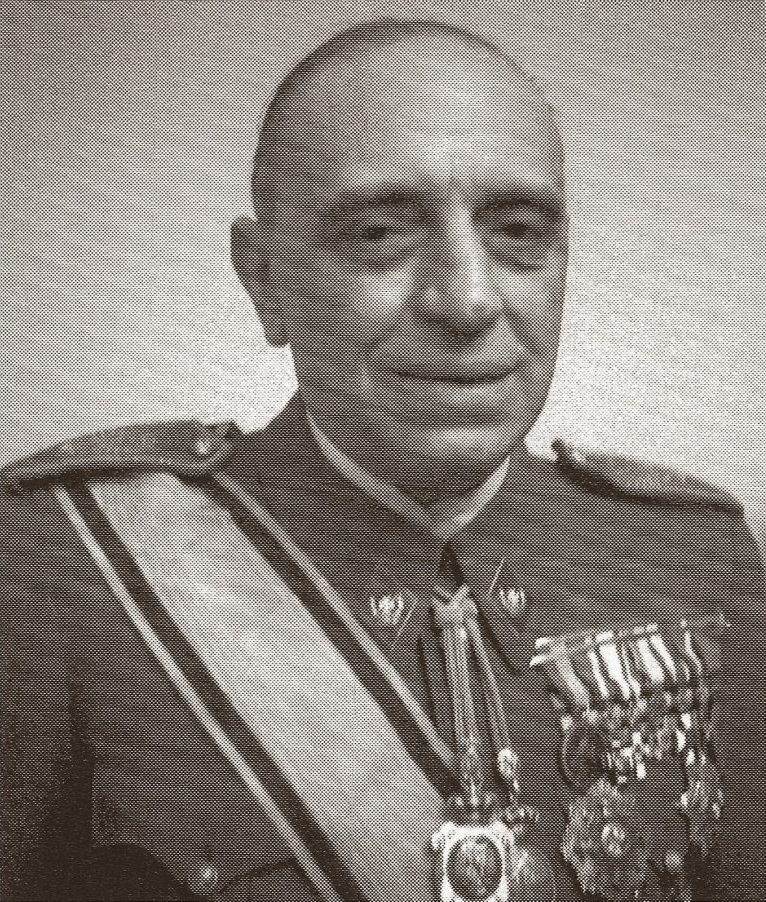
- Born: Antonio Vallejo-Nájera Lobón; 20 July 1888; Paredes de Nava, Spain
- Died: 25 February 1960 (aged 70); Madrid, Spain
- Education: University of Valladolid
- Occupations: psychiatrist, physician and university teacher
- Employer(s): University of Madrid, Spanish Military Health Corps
- Known for: Hispanic eugenics
- Children: Juan Antonio Vallejo-Nágera
- Awards: Grand Cross of the Civil Order of Health

Antonio Vallejo-Nájera (1888–1960) was a Spanish psychiatrist. He was interested in eugenics and proposed a link between Marxism and intellectual disability, something he sought to prove through experimenting on Republican prisoners. His ideas led to the thefts of many Spanish newborns and young children from their left-wing parents in Francoist Spain; as many as 30,000 children were taken from leftist families and placed with nationalist families. Vallejo-Nájera was rewarded for his assistance during the Spanish Civil War and he became a leading figure in Spanish psychiatry.

== Early life ==
Vallejo-Nájera was born in Paredes de Nava in 1889. He studied medicine at the University of Valladolid and joined the army’s sanitary corps in 1910, taking part in the Rif War between 1912 and 1915. During World War I he was posted to the military department at the Spanish Embassy in Berlin. There he met well-known figures of German psychiatry such as Hans Walter Gruhle, Julius Schwalbe and Ernst Kretschmer. He also conducted inspections of prisoner of war concentration camps, an activity for which he was awarded medals by Belgium and France after the war. On returning to Spain he worked at the Ciempozuelos Military Psychiatric Clinic. When the Civil War broke out he was a teacher of Psychiatry in the Military Sanitary Academy.

Vallejo-Nájera promoted in Spain a personal notion of eugenics, intending to reconcile German doctrines of racial hygiene from authors like Schwalbe with the requirements of Catholic moral doctrine, opposed to state-imposed measures of eugenic restriction. He advocated eugamia, a eugenic policy implemented through premarital orientation work based on the biopsychological assessment of a couple’s personality.

== Spanish Civil War and Francoist repression ==
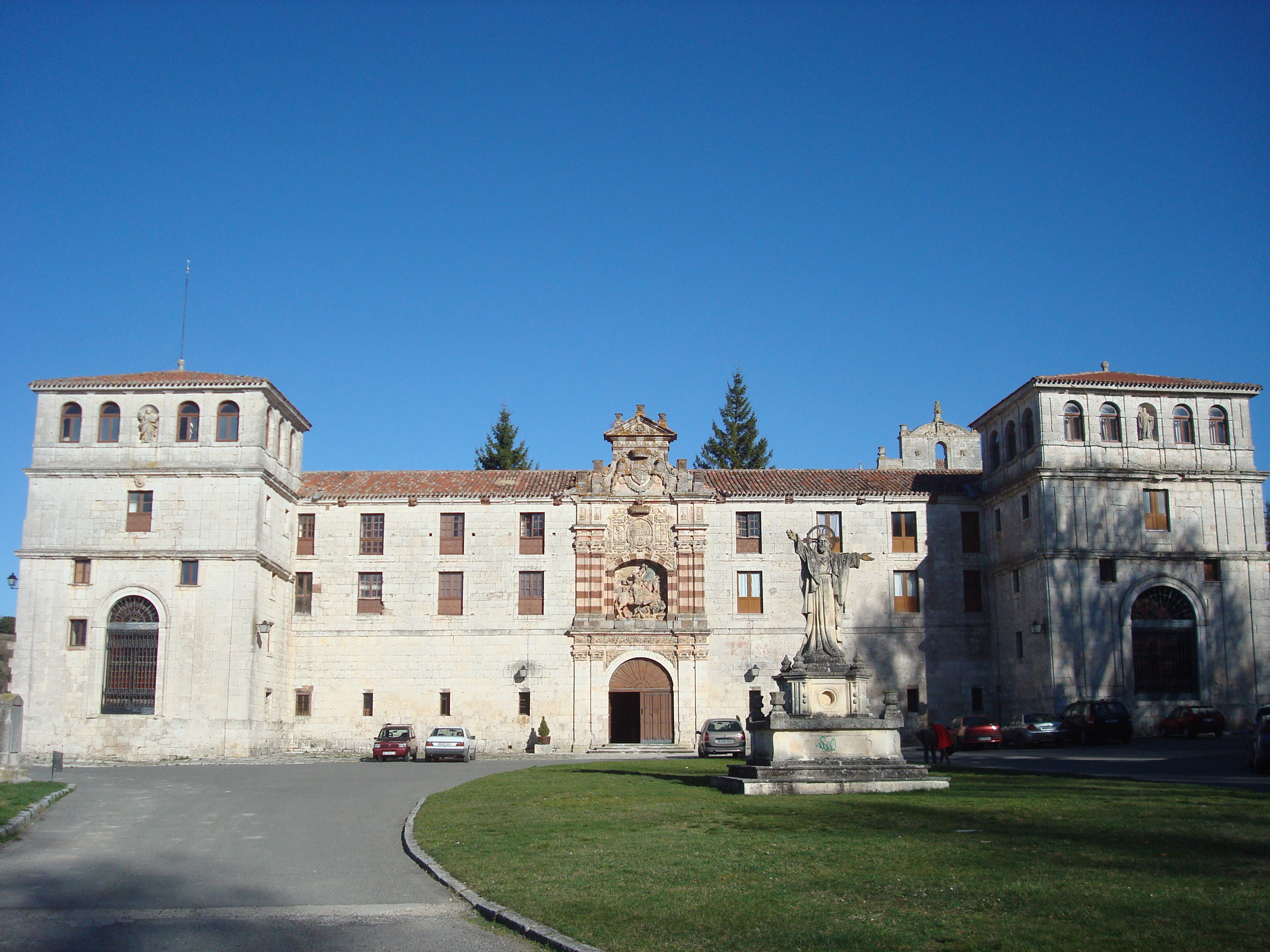
The monastery of San Pedro de Cardeña, which was used as a concentration camp and whose prisoners Vallejo-Nájera experimented on

During the Spanish Civil War he supported the nationalists. In 1938, he was made head of the Psychiatric Services for the nationalist army and set up the Gabinete de Investigaciones Psicológicas de la Inspección de Campos de Concentración de Prisioneros de Guerra (Psychological Research Bureau of Inspection of Prisoner of War Concentration Camps), a center for psychological investigations. The bureau was established near the San Pedro de Cardeña concentration camp and had fourteen clinics in the nationalist zone. Vallejo-Nájera carried out psychological tests on female Spanish Republican Army prisoners in Málaga and International Brigades members held in the monastery of San Pedro de Cardeña to establish "the bio-psychic roots of Marxism" and find the "red gene". With the latter group of prisoners, Vallejo-Nájera acted on the assumption that the prisoners were degenerate and prone to Marxist criminality. He explained "female revolutionary criminality" through the animal nature of the female psyche and the "marked sadistic nature" released when a political environment allowed women to "satisfy their latent sexual appetites". For Vallejo-Nájera, Marxists were genetic retards and Marxism was a mental illness: "A priori, it seems probable that psychopaths of all types would join the Marxist ranks... Since Marxism goes together with social immorality... we presume those fanatics who fought with arms will show schizoid temperaments".

Vallejo-Nájera’s conclusions were that the only way to prevent the racial dissolution of the Spanish was to take away the "red" children from their mothers in places "away from democratic environments and where the exaltation of bio-psychic racial qualities is encouraged". By 1943, 12,043 children had been taken from their mothers and handed over to orphanages or Francoist families, but the number of children taken away from their parents may be closer to 30,000. Furthermore, many children evacuated by the Republic to France, England and elsewhere were forced to return against the will of their parents. In some cases birth records were destroyed and the children's names changed in order to prevent any further contact with their parents. Vallejo-Nájera had a direct link to the Francoist regime's organization for war orphans, Auxilio Social, through his friend Jesús Ercilla Ortega.

Vallejo-Nájera contributed to the justification of the Francoist post-war repression. He said that the "reds" should: "suffer the punishment they deserve, with death the easiest of them all. Some will live in permanent exile... Others will lose their freedom, groaning for years in prisons, purging their crimes with forced work in order to earn their daily bread...". According to Paul Preston the "investigations" of Vallejo-Najera provided the Francoist State with "scientific" arguments in order to "justify their views on the subhuman nature of their adversaries".

== Later life ==
When the Civil War ended, Vallejo-Nájera's support for Francoism was rewarded by his appointment as Professor of Psychiatry at the University of Madrid. "He became one of the most influential figures in Spanish Psychiatry and Psychology in the forties and fifties: his name is among the 16 founders of the Spanish Psychological Society."

He died in 1960.

== See also ==
- White Terror (Spain)
- Karl Brandt
- Walter Gross
