= Waldhaus Psychiatric Clinic Genealogical Archives =

Archives at a Swiss psychiatric clinic

The Waldhaus Psychiatric Clinic Genealogical Archives (German: Stammbaumarchiv der Psychiatrischen Klinik Waldhaus) were a collection of genealogical records compiled at the Waldhaus Psychiatric Clinic in Chur, Switzerland, between 1951 and 1977. Created under the direction of psychiatrist Gottlob Pflugfelder, the archives contained more than 500 files documenting prominent Grisons families, particularly those of Yenish heritage. The archives, pejoratively known as Sippenarchiv (clan archives), were transferred to the Grisons State Archives in the early 1990s.

== Background and establishment ==
The genealogical archives built upon earlier work by Johann Joseph Jörger and Alfred Siegfried. Jörger, founder of the Waldhaus Clinic and its director from 1892 to 1930, had assembled documents on the Yenish people of Grisons and published an internationally recognized study titled Psychiatrische Familiengeschichten (Psychiatric Family Histories) in 1919 through Julius Springer-Verlag in Berlin. Siegfried, who served as long-time director of the "Children of the Road" program within Pro Juventute, had compiled files on children from Yenish families and transferred them to the clinic.

Gottlob Pflugfelder, originally from Basel, completed his psychiatric training from 1942 to 1950 at the cantonal Heil- und Pflegeanstalt Friedmatt institution. After briefly working at the Münsterlingen psychiatric clinic, which already maintained genealogical archives, he assumed directorship of the Waldhaus Clinic in 1951. Like his predecessor, Pflugfelder dedicated himself to the "study" of the Yenish people, expanding upon the existing documentation.

== Content and methodology ==
The 502 files in the archives, organized by surname, contained family trees of prominent families along with psychiatric assessments, medical histories, guardianship reports, and correspondence that Pflugfelder collected in addition to the regular patient files of the clinic. Among these files, 42 related entirely or partially to Yenish communities and contained information on 177 individuals. Although their proportion was small, these files were more comprehensive than average and were specially marked.

Pflugfelder was interested in various hereditary diseases and believed that the biological processes of heredity could be particularly well studied among Grisons Yenish families due to their numerous kinship connections. He viewed the non-sedentary lifestyle as being influenced by both genetic heritage and environment, though he placed greater emphasis on heredity. In his assessments, Pflugfelder equated Yenish ancestry, particularly non-sedentary behavior, with illness, often describing it using stigmatizing terms related to mental or moral deficiency. His theories aligned with eugenics movements of the time.

In his expert opinions, Pflugfelder frequently recommended guardianship, prevention of marriage, or sterilization as eugenic measures, typically targeting young, uneducated women. The remaining 460 family files have not yet been systematically researched.

== Public criticism and controversy ==
In 1988, Grisons journalist Hans Caprez drew public attention to the existence of the Waldhaus Clinic's genealogical archives in an article titled "Das grenzt an Rassismus" (This borders on racism) published in the Schweizerischer Beobachter. Together with Yenish writer Mariella Mehr, he criticized the clinic for systematically collecting information on Yenish families and demanded the destruction of the genealogical archives.

In response to these criticisms, after conducting a summary review of their contents, the Grisons government concluded that the archives only partially concerned the Yenish people, as they also contained numerous files on families not belonging to these groups. Benedikt Fontana, who had succeeded Pflugfelder in 1977, was then director of the clinic. He had authored a thesis in the 1960s based on Siegfried's ward files preserved in the archives, continuing a decades-long tradition of Yenish "studies" at the Waldhaus Clinic.

Following the public controversy, the archives were transferred to the Grisons State Archives in the early 1990s, where they remain under restricted access due to their sensitive nature and the privacy concerns surrounding the documented individuals and families.

== Bibliography ==
- Pflugfelder, Gottlob: "Das Vagantenwesen", in: Terra Grischuna, 20/1, 1961, pp. 29–30.
- Galle, Sara: "Bündner 'Vagantenfamilien' im Fokus der Pro Juventute. Die Zusammenarbeit der privaten Stiftung mit den Behörden und der psychiatrischen Klinik Waldhaus", in: Institut für Kulturforschung Graubünden (ed.): Puur und Kessler. Sesshafte und Fahrende in Graubünden, 2008, pp. 170–218.
- Aliesch, Carmen: "Das Waldhaus, die Eugenik und die Jenischen im 20. Jahrhundert: Eine Untersuchung des sogenannten 'Sippenarchivs' der Psychiatrischen Klinik Waldhaus", in: Jahrbuch Historische Gesellschaft Graubünden, 147, 2017, pp. 101–144.
- Gusset, Silas; Seglias, Loretta; Lengwiler, Martin: Versorgen, behandeln, pflegen. Geschichte der Psychiatrie in Graubünden, 2021.
