= Hispanic eugenics =

Eugenics as theorized or practiced in Spain

Hispanic eugenics are eugenics based around the political purification of a people, developed in Spain during the interwar period and put into practice in the Spanish Civil War, eventually being made into political policy in Francoist Spain. The concept was first expounded upon in the 1930s by men like Antonio Vallejo-Nájera and Gregorio Marañón. It was heavily influenced by Roman Catholicism. Much of this was realized through Francoist policies around the role of women and their bodies.

== Race and ideology ==
Eugenics in Spain in the late 1930s and through to the 1940s was not based on race, but instead on people's political alignment with the regime. Ricardo Campos said, "the racial question during the Franco era is complex." He went on to say, "despite the similarities of the Franco regime with the Italian and German fascism and the interest that the eugenics provoked, the strong Catholicism of the regime prevented its defense of the eugenic policies that were practiced in the Nazi Germany." Campos's translated text went on to say, "it was very difficult to racialize the Spanish population biologically because of the mixture that had been produced historically." Vallejo-Nágera in his 1937 work, Eugenics of the Hispanicity and Regeneration of the Race defined Hispanicness around spirituality and religion. The goal was the "strengthening psychologically" of the phenotype. Because Catholicism was opposed to negative eugenics, the only way to fight the degradation was through repression of abortion, euthanasia and contraception.

== Ideological pioneers ==
Hispanic eugenics was pioneered by doctors like Antonio Vallejo-Nájera and Gregorio Marañón. Antes que te cases was published by Nájera in 1946, with one part saying, "Racial decadence is the result of many things but the most important is conjugal unhappiness in the most prosperous and happy of homes. ... Eugenic precepts may avoid morbid offspring. ... It is impossible a robust race without a sound preparation of youth for marriage, through Catholic Morality. This little work is a minuscule contribution to the exaltation of the Fatherland." Vallejo Nájera's 1937 book, Eugenesia de la Hispanidad y la regeneración de la raza outlined the purpose of Hispanic eugenics as being about returning Spain to its historical glory by purifying not the Spanish race, but Spain's political ideology. Marañón's 1921 Maternidad y feminismo, republished as a second edition in 1951, said, "The difference between the sexes is insurmountable. Such difference emerges from the anatomical surface of each man and woman, and it goes to the deepest, darkest roots of life, to the home of the cells."

== Catholic influence ==
Science was viewed as a complement to Catholic eugenics in Spain. Hispanic eugenics has, in comparison to Nazi Germany, been tremendously influenced by the Catholic Church. In Francisco Haro's 1930 Eugenesia y Matrimonio, he wanted to see the introduction of marriage certificates to insure morality in eugenic practices through the use of positive population control instead of negative population control. His thinking was informed by Catholic tradition.

Hispanic eugenics were further supported out of condemnation of the left, who supported negative eugenics policies and who were anti-clerical in their outlook. This made Hispanic eugenicists more likely to support positive eugenics with a Catholic tie in.

== Women's reproduction in Spain ==
Doctors in Francoist Spain had two roles: to be moral protectors of Spanish reproduction and to provide science based medical services. This put male doctors in charge of women's birth control. When medical doctors in the Second Republic and early Francoist period defended birth control, it was on the eugenics grounds that it protected the health of both women and children, especially as it related to the spread of genetic disease and the spread of tuberculosis and sexually transmitted diseases.

Hispanic eugenics and pronatalism were viewed as key components of addressing the decline in the Spanish birth rate and the need for an increased population size to serve the needs of the Spanish state during the Francoist period. Policies around this eugenics program involved bans on abortion, infanticide, contraception and information around contraception. This practice was started as policy during the Dictatorship of Primo de Rivera, discontinued by the Second Republic and then picked up again as a national level policy by Francoists. Anything that was viewed by the state as interfering with women's reproduction activities and increasing the size of the Spanish population size were viewed as being in opposition to the state. All activities that stopped this began to become defined by the regime as crimes.

Anyone who did not fit into traditional gender norms and who expressed any deviance from Roman Catholic sexual norms was viewed as a sexual pervert. While some women quietly questioned their biologically determined place in society, male intellectuals provided rationals to support Francoist policies that used medical and biological sciences, along with anatomy and physiological studies. These works often drew on phrenological works by doctors such as Franz Joseph Gall that were later translated into Spanish. Carmen de Burgos Seguí published one such translation in La inferioridad mental de la mujer which said, "Many female characteristics are very similar to those of beasts; mainly the lack of a main of their own. Since the beginning of times they have functions like that, hence the human race would be stagnated in its original state if there were only women."

The Franco government found an ally in their anti-abortion beliefs and practices in the Roman Catholic Church. Those within the Catholic Church wrote in support of the law, with Father Jaime Pujiula, Professor of the Colegio Máximo de San Ignacio de Sarriá and member of the Royal Academies of Sciences of Madrid and Medicine of Barcelona saying, "The fruit that is lost criminally would be perhaps the most robust man, the healthiest, the most intelligent to raise the same society or to renew it or print new directions and directions." It is also an attack against population problems. of society and Eugenics, not only the women who cause the abortion, but the perverse midwives and doctors conspired with them to perpetrate the crime for the vile spirit of profit are responsible before God, before society and before the Eugenics."

Because midwives appeared to be so frequently involved in sharing knowledge about abortion and contraceptives and performing abortions, the male led scientific community in Spain tried to marginalize these women. Professionalization in medicine would help to further relegate the importance of midwives in Spain. Further attempts to dislodge midwives from the birthing process included accusing them of witchcraft and quackery, trying to make them appear unscientific. This was all part of a medical and eugenic science driven effort to reduce the number of abortions in Spain.

PSOE introduced legislation to legalize abortion in 1983 through an amendment to Spain's penal code. Abortion was finally made legal by Congress later that year by a vote of 186 - 50, but did not enter into legal effect until July 1985 as Coalición Popular (now Partido Popular) challenged the constitutionality of the law. The decriminalization of abortion was allowed for three reasons. The first was that it was ethical in the case of rape. The second was it could be a necessary to save the life of the mother. The third reason was that eugenic, allowing abortion in case of fetal malformation.

== History ==
A Hispanic eugenics conference took place from 21 April to 10 May 1933 in Madrid, where topics like eugenics, divorce, abortion, birth control and prostitution were discussed by over fifty intellectuals.

Catalan eugenics supporters were advocating their own form of Hispanic eugenics by 1934, with its leading advocates including Hermenegildo Puig i Sais, Josep A. Vandellós, Pompeu Fabra, and Francesiso Maspons. Josep A. Vandellós published his first book advocating Catalan eugenics in 1934. The Societat Catalana d'Eugenèsia was founded that year. Their purpose was to create an improved Catalan people.

== See also ==
- Blanqueamiento – Racial ideology favouring white skin
- Limpieza de sangre
- Eugen Relgis#Eugenics
