= Gender violence and rape in Francoist Spain and the democratic transition =

Aspect of Spanish history, 1936–1975

Gender violence and rape in Francoist Spain was a problem that was a result of Nationalist attitudes developed during the Spanish Civil War. Sexual violence was common on the part of Nationalist forces and their allies during the Civil War. Falangist rearguard troops would rape and murder women in cemeteries, hospitals, farmhouses, and prisons. They would rape, torture and murder socialists, young girls, nurses and milicianas.

Regular Nationalist soldiers engaged in similar patterns of rape, torture and murder in places like Maials, Callus and Cantalpino. Moroccan Foreign Legionaries were used to commit rape against women to instil terror among local populaces, using rape as a weapon of war. Women in prison were also raped, often facing death if they refused to have sex with their captors. The exact extent of the problem will likely never be known as there was less record keeping around women, and quantification attempts have largely resulted in the erasure of women's history.

After the Civil War ended, Spanish men returned home to a culture that insisted women were completely subservient to men, and where men were allowed to have sex with prostitutes and otherwise be promiscuous. Women were taught to be subservient and that their happiness was not important. This culture encouraged domestic violence by husbands towards wives, and it included rape. Laws made non-consensual sex illegal in some cases, but there was tremendous social pressure not to report this behavior. Women with Republican ties were often raped until at least the 1960s, with social acceptance of the practice. These women often tried to move to cities to become more anonymous. Some were raped and sexually harassed in prison, including Lidia Falcón O'Neill.

From 1941 to the early 1980s, the Women's Protection Board confined girls and young women deemed 'fallen or at risk of falling', even without having committed any crime, and forced them to give birth only to have their babies stolen.

As a result of Franco's death in 1975 and the democratic transition starting, the first protest condemning violence against women was held in Barcelona in 1976. Age of consent laws changed two years later, along with laws about honesty. Men were also legally able to be considered rape victims. Divorce was legalized in 1981. Other legal reforms took place in 1983. Still, rape was not treated as a serious institutional problem inside Spain and victims had little recourse. In 1987, Spain's Supreme Court ruled that rape victims did not need to prove they actively fought off their rapist to lodge a complaint.

Historical memory laws in Spain have resulted in more attention about to the violence faced by women during the Spanish Civil War and the Francoist period. The Junta de Andalusia started offering women compensation for violence against them in 2010. Court cases also began to be explored against perpetrators of these crimes, with some action taking place in Spain but most of the attempts to prosecute taking place in Argentina.

== History ==
=== Francoist forces in the Civil War period (1936 - 1939) ===
Repression against women by Nationalist forces has been difficult to understand as historians have traditionally been obsessed with quantifying the number dead, imprisoned and wounded. As much more detailed records were kept about men than women, the history of Francoist repression specifically targeting women has historically underrepresented women or devalued the specific repression women faced in this period. Much of the violence in this period was gendered, and there were efforts to dismiss, hide or downplay violence against women as part of further efforts to repress women. Quantification has largely resulted in the erasure of women's history.

Sexual violence was a commonly used tactic by Nationalist forces during the Spanish Civil War, aimed exclusively at women. It was coupled with other violence aimed at women, including forcing women to drink castor oil so they would uncontrollably soil themselves, taking children away from women in prison, taking children away from mothers and placing them in Nationalist homes before the mother was executed. Women were considered prizes of war; their bodies were considered part of a battlefield that Nationalist forces had to defeat. The purpose was to force women into subordination or to use women's trauma to control male family members.

Women and girls in Nationalist prisons were systematically raped. As a form of punishment, women sometimes were paraded through the streets wearing very little clothing. They were made to sing "Face to the sun". Their heads were often shaved in an attempt to humiliate them by stripping them of one of their outward signs of femininity. Many of these practices were borrowed from Italian fascists. To add to the humiliation of these women, many had their households ransacked, with all their valuables stolen by Nationalist supporters who then sold all their property on the black market. The Franco regime's actions against women during the Civil War were flagrant and unprosecuted violations of the 1898 Hague Convention and 1929 Geneva Convention. The total numbers of women who were victims of sexual violence and abuse during the Civil War will never be known.

Falangist troops acted as rearguard troops, serving in places captured by troops or where there had never really been any nationalist opposition. Daria and Mercedes Buxadé, two sisters from Barcelona, were participating in Republican action against Franco's nationalist forces in Mallorca in 1936. After being caught, Falangist troops gave them a virginity test, and then brutally and repeatedly raped the sisters. Margalida Jaume was in Mallorca in the same time, and Falangist also raped her. Pilar Sánchez, the wife of a socialist party member, was also hiding from Falangists. She too was discovered by a group of four Falangists who beat and raped her, before taking to her a cemetery where they raped her again and then executed her. All were thrown into common graves. During the Civil War, Falangists raped women in the courtyard of the hospital in Oviedo, and in the Melilla prison. Civil Guard corporal Juan Vadillo and Falangist Fernando Zamacola were both decorated by Nationalists forces after they raped women in Benamahoma.

In the town of Brenes, a woman was taken to a farmhouse, and then forced lay on the ground and roll up her dress to expose her genitals. After this was completed, Falangist Joaquín Barragán Díaz was given scissors so he could cut off all the woman's genital hair. He refused. A member of the Civil Guard was brought in to do this, but he only half finished removing her genital hair. Finally, the head of Falange de Brenes completed the job. Wife of a socialist councilor of a pueblo in Andalucia of El Gastor, María Torreño was beaten so badly that she miscarried. She was then abandoned by her Falangist torturers, and died a short time later as a result of the torture she had been subjected to. After Frasquita Avilés rejected a Falangist who fell in love with her, the Falangist killed her and then raped her in a cemetery.

In Fuentes de Andalucía, five young girls between the ages of 16 and 22 were raped, murdered and then thrown into a well by Falangists on 27 August 1936. Their names are María León Becerril, María Jesús Caro González, Joaquina Lora Muñoz, Coral García Lora and Josefa García Lora. Before their rapes and murders, they were forced to drink alcohol and perform oral sex on male Falangists and were paraded through the streets in only their underwear. After they were thrown in the well, the Falangists paraded through the town with the women's underwear hung like flags from their rifles and shotguns. Five female nurses from Barcelona were captured in Majorca after the Republican retreat. Falangists gave all intrusive virginity tests, and then engaged in group rape in Manacor. The next day, all five women were murdered in the Son Coletes cemetery. Following their deaths, Falangists tried to depict these Republican nurses as prostitutes to justify their actions. The reputations of these Republican nurses would not be rehabilitated until 2005.

Nationalists forces would rape girls as young as 12, sometimes repeatedly. One such incident occurred in Moguer. Sometimes Nationalist soldiers would stay in homes of poor families with no man present. They would take advantage of the situation to rape women in the household. In Peguerinos, two female nurses and other local women were raped by Falangists. Pregnant and non-pregnant women were raped and then executed in Spanish cities like Fuente de Cantos, Zafra, Almendralejo, Aguacho, Fuente del Maestre, Boecillo, Valdedios, Pallars Sobirá and Zufre. Sometimes after Falangists were done raping women, they would brand the breasts of their victims with the yoke and phalanx arrows, the Falangist symbol. In late 1938, a 17-year-old girl in Unarre was forced to watch her mother being executed, and then she was brutally gang raped and executed. When Nationalist troops occupied Vizcaya in the summer of 1937, their supporters engaged in wide scale sexual harassment. Women's heads were shaved, and some were publicly beaten while half naked. This caused psychological damage not just to the victims, but also to their families who had to bear witness to the abuse. Catholic Nationalist troops also engaged in sexual violence against Republican women. Led by General Mola, a group of regulars in Valdediós first raped fourteen nurses and a 15-year-old girl. They then murdered them.

Regular Nationalists soldiers raped at least four women in Maials. Another group of Nationalist regulars raped a woman, her daughter and her female cousin in Callus. When they were done, they then bayoneted the women. Other regulars in Marganell raped two women and then executed them by placing grenades between their legs. Regulars also raped several young women in Cantalpino. On 24 December 1938, four women in Maials were raped, including one who was raped at gunpoint in front of her husband and 7-year-old son. In Callús, a husband had to watch his wife, daughter and female cousin be raped by Regulars before they were bayoneted, also in front of him. Milicianas, female militia members, were also frequently raped by Nationalist supporters when captured on the battlefield. They also had their heads shaved.

Women and girls in Nationalists prisons were often raped. This was common in the Las Sales Prison, where women were removed by Falangists to their barracks to be raped. Thirty women were raped in the course of three months by two officials at the Albacete prison. The voices of victims could be heard screaming throughout the prison. Women in prison were constantly faced with guards who asked them for sexual favors in exchange for improving their situation in prison or the situation of other incarcerated relatives. Some female political prisoners in Vizcaya in late 1937 refused to have sex with their Nationalist military captors, even with the threat of being executed. The night after refusing, many were actually shot. The stories of these women's resistance were spread by word of mouth, and they became symbols of resistance for other women facing repression.

As a way of creating additional humiliation for women and their families, Nationalist troops would sometimes direct groups of Moroccan soldiers under their command to rape specific women and groups of women in villages. These sexual assaults were often so brutal that women victims died within hours. One such case occurred in Navalcarnero. Because many died, it makes getting approximate numbers of rape victims difficult. Another occurred in San Roque, with the anarchist woman subsequently being shot by a firing squad. Other incidents also occurred in Seville, which Gonzalo Queipo de Llano discussed on his radio program. This practice of using Moroccan Foreign Legion members to rape local women was a carryover from Spanish military actions in their colonial possessions. German soldiers offering Nationalists support during the Civil War would sometimes delight in taking photographs of violence committed by Spanish Moroccan Legionaries against women, including the removal of women's breasts. Despite Franco's attempts to intervene to stop this behavior, it continued.

Foreign Affairs magazine in October 1942 said of Francoist commanders, "They never denied that they had promised white women to the Moors when they entered Madrid. Sitting with the officers on a camp bivouac, I overheard them discussing the collusion of that promise; only some argued that a woman was still Spanish despite her "red" ideas. This practice was not denied either by El Mizzian, the only Moroccan officer of the Spanish army. I was with this soldier at the road junction of Navalcarnero when two Spanish girls, who seemed not to have turned twenty yet, were brought before him. One of them had worked in a textile factory in Barcelona and a union card was found on her jacket; the other, from Valencia, claimed not to have political convictions. After questioning them to get some information of a military nature, El Mizzian took them to a small building that had been the village school, where about forty Moors rested. When they reached the door, there was a howling scream from the throats of the soldiers. I attended the scene horrified and uselessly indignant. El Mizzian smiled affectionately when I protested what happened saying, "Oh, they will not live more than four hours.""

On extreme occasions, men were prosecuted in military courts for the violence they committed against women, though even then most male perpetrators were acquitted. Sevillian homosexual Falangist Andrés Díaz murdered his pregnant ex-wife Ana Lineros while she was giving birth, having taken her from jail and shaving her first. He then tried to hide her body. Díaz was acquitted of murder because the court ruled Lineros was a dangerous red, despite lots of testimony from other women who claimed she was not. In a case in Torre Alháquime, when there was a leadership in Falange, the incoming boss wrote an internal report that accused the outgoing leader as drunk, rapist and extortionist. For the most part, such written testimonies either do not exist, were destroyed or have gone missing.

Women in Extremadura who worked in homes of the rich as seamstresses tried to form a union in the spring of 1936. Following the start of the Civil War, these women were tried for their attempt to unionize. Their punishment was sexual abuse.

==== Gonzalo Queipo de Llano ====
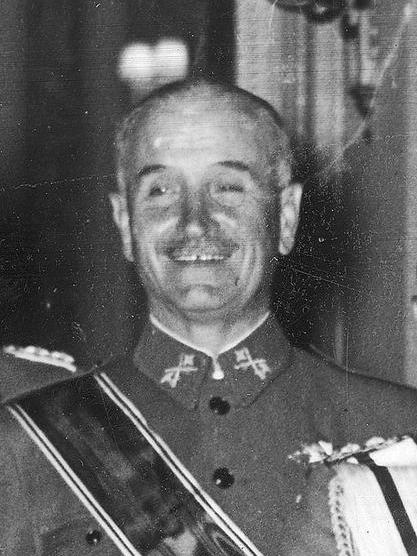
Gonzalo Queipo de Llano in Berlín in 1939.

Queipo de Llano had a radio program, where he said of the mass rape which occurred in Seville, "Our brave legionaries and regulars have taught the cowards of the reds what it means to be a man. And, by the way, also to women. After all, these communists and anarchists deserve it, have not they been playing free love? Now at least they will know what real men are and not sissy militiamen. They will not fight, no matter how hard they struggle and kick."

Queipo de Llano would also resort to calling Republican he opposed prostitutes. On his radio show, he said of Dolores Ibárruri "The famous Pasionaria has taken it with me because she does not realize that I admire her, for having managed to ascend from virgin of 30 reals to the first figure of the regime." His radio show was so explicit in its violence that it was sometimes censored by Francoist forces. Ahead of the Málaga–Almería road massacre, which saw thousands of women and children attempting to escape Malaga for Almería, "Yes, red scoundrel from Malaga, wait until I get there in ten days! I will sit in a café on Calle Larios drinking beer and for each sip of mine you will fall ten. I will fire ten … for each one of us who you shoot, even if I have to get you out of the grave to do it." Of the potential capture of Sevilla and Cordoba, he said, "Tomorrow we take Peñaflor, so let the women of the reds prepare their mourning shawls. We are determined to apply the law with inexorable firmness: Morón, Utrera, Puente Genil, to prepare graves. I authorize you to kill like any dog who resists you, that if you do so, you will be exempt from all guilt."

Rafael Alberti wrote a poem that was read of Nationalist radio by Queipo de Llano that said, "Tonight I take Malaga, / on Monday, I took Jerez, / Montilla and Cazalla Tuesday, / Wednesday, Chinchón, and on Thursday, / drunk and in the morning, / all the stables / Madrid, all the blocks, / mullendo cagajones, / they will give me their soft bed./ Oh, what a treat sleeping / taking for a pillow / and at the reach of the snout / two cribs of alfalfa. / What an honor to go to the tying / of the halter! What remarkable grace / receive in my hooves, / nailed with hooks, / the horseshoes that Franco / won by boldness in Africa! / I already have my back lowered, / my legs are already lowered, and my ears are growing, / already the teeth are lengthened, / the cinch comes short, / the reins are falling out of my way, / gallop, gallop … step. / I'll be in Madrid tomorrow, / that the schools close, / that the taverns open, / nothing of Universities, / of Institutes, nothing, nothing, / that the wine runs to the meeting / of a liberator of Spain. / - Attention! Radio Sevilla. / The general of this square, / foolish brave idiot, / Queipo de Llano, he doesn't say anything."

Nationalist supporters defined women two ways: Either as good, Catholic, self-sacrificing mothers, or immoral women who provoked men by their dress, showing off bare arms and using tight clothing to highlight their form. For figures like Gonzalo Queipo de Llano, these women were worth degenerating further through rape.

=== Francoist period (1939 - 1975) ===
When men returned home from the front lines of the Civil War, culture dictated they had a certain sexual freedom that women were denied. This included the ability to go out at night, have sex with prostitutes and otherwise be promiscuous. At the same time, the return of traditional Catholicism demanded the woman return to traditional roles such as the wife and mother.

Women were taught in the Francoist period that their purpose was to submit to their husbands, and this included in areas of sex where they were to humbly accede. Domestic violence, committed by men towards their spouses, was a rampant problem in Francoist Spain. This sort of violence against women was perfectly legal, and women had no recourse for dealing with it as they were considered legal property of their husbands. For many married women in the 1940s, 1950s and 1960s, sexual abuse was the norm in marriage. A woman from Córdoba named Theodora described her experiences with her husband in this period as, "I did not want, I did not want to [have sex]. Because if he came (…) Because he has always came late (…) Frozen from drinking and smoking, to me what I would like, if I came to a tart wine and I did not feel like it. But he, whether I wanted to or not, would take me and put me face up and go up and I gave him a speech and he did not care about me, that I had no pleasure." Some women would pretend to be menstruating to avoid having sex with their husbands.

The Penal Code of 1848 established the definition of sexual crimes in Spain. It would not be substantially altered until 1996, and was the major law related to this type of crime in the Francoist period. Title X had a section called "Crimes against honesty". This section deal with a number of crimes including adultery, rape and corruption of minors and kidnapping. Rape was specifically dealt with in article 363. It required that force or intimidation directed at the victim or deprivation "of reason or sense" on the part of the victim or the victim need to be under the age of 12 needed to be present for rape to occur. Dishonest abuse was another category related to sex crimes. This included things like anal penetration. Rape convictions lead to sentences of 12 to 20 years. Teachers, priests and authority figures could be imprisoned for having carnal knowledge of those under their care between the ages of 12 and 23, with a minor prison sentence of 4 to 6 years. If the charge was only of dishonest abuse, then prison time could be between 7 months and 6 years. Men could often avoid prison time by marrying their victims.

A law enacted by Franco in December 1941 said that pregnant women given death sentences would have their executions stayed until they gave birth. At that point, the baby would be given to the father if he was alive and in Spain. Otherwise, many of these women had their newborns taken from them where, had the last names of their baby changed, and then were given to loyal Nationalist families. This law helped formalize the stolen babies process, a process that would not end until the middle of the democratic transition. Estimates by activists put the number of stolen babies at around 30,960 boys and girls.

The Law of 6 November 1942 changed the criminal code around both rape and adultery. Women between the ages of 16 and 23 who were deceived into having sex could file a complaint again a man, which could see him going to prison for up to six months. If an honest woman was deceived into having carnal sex with a man and abuse was also involved, then he could receive 12 to 16 years in prison. Employers who abused honest women in their employ into having sex with them could also be imprisoned, though this sentence could be commuted if he married her. Financial penalties for committing rape were also increased.

The 1944 Penal Code said rape was a punishable offense when a girl was between 12 and 23 if she was a virgin, and between the ages of 17 and 23 if she was not. The 1944 Penal Code also made it so that in almost all cases, only married women and men they had affairs with could be guilty of adultery; married men were only guilty if they brought their mistresses to live in the marital home. The 1945 Law of Political Responsibilities punished anyone who showed any active or passive affinity towards the Second Republic or towards the "reds". In the Northwest Region of Murcia, only 2.49% of the arrests under the Law of Political Responsibilities involved women. Women guilty of this offense were not always charged this way.

A 1944 edition of Semanario de la SF said, "The life of every woman, despite what she may pretend, is nothing but a continuous desire to find somebody to whom she can succumb. Voluntary dependency, the offering of every minute, every desire and illusion is the most beautiful thing, because it implies the cleaning away of all the bad germs —vanity, selfishness, frivolity — by love."

Women in prison during the Francoist period continued to have their heads shaved as a way of denying their womanhood. Women in Francoist Spain were sometimes subject to forced abortions. The regime claimed that if a woman had an orgasm; it was an insult to her husband. Lidia Falcón O'Neill, arrested seven times, was abused so badly in Madrid's Yeseria prison and in Barcelona's Trinidad prison between 1960 and 1974 that she was left permanently damaged. While beating her, one guard shouted, "¡Now you will not give birth anymore, bitch witch!" Falcón later said of this, "In my case, in addition to the blows, one of the humiliations or insults that they repeated was 'bitch, that way you will not give birth anymore', because they hit me in the abdomen." She said of other women's experiences in prison with her, "Others were raped; luckily it did not happen to me. […] They undressed them … there is a macho sadism that enjoys a free woman to deliver her to his criminal instincts."

Children, both boys and girls, who lived in state-run boarding schools or in orphanages run by the Catholic Church were often subject to violence, degradation and rape. Julia Ferrer, who lived at the Casa de la Caridad in Barcelona, said of her own personal experience, "They took me to Sant Boi. Sometimes I would answer the nun and they would punish me with electric shock, but not because she was crazy, but as punishment."

Rape of women with Republican ties was common until at least the 1960s, with authorities generally treating male perpetrators as immune to prosecution. Everyone was taught to look the other way when violations of women occurred, and records of rape were not kept. Anita Sirgo and Tina Pérez were both raped while in prison as a result of their involvement in the 1962 Asturian mining strikes. The rapes took place as part of broader torture they were forced to submit to.

While rape was illegal in some instances in Spain, the crime was under-reported in the Franco period because women saw being a rape victim as a source of humiliation and shame. This was compounded by the fact that many victims were not highly educated and lacked the personal confidence to undergo a humiliating experience of reporting the act to the police who were often suspect of their claims or who would take the side of the rapist by default.

==== Consultorio de Elena Francis ====
Consultorio de Elena Francis was a radio program that aired in Spain between 1947 and 1984, where women were able to ask for advice on problems they had. Issues of marital gender violence often came up. The show was created by Angela Castells, a member of Sección Femenina, the Patronato de Protección de la Mujer and the Spanish League against Public Immorality, Spain's immorality police. Letters with delicate subject matters did not air, but did receive sometimes horrifying responses. Many women wrote to the show as they had no one else to turn to. None of the letters that have been preserved from the show use the word rape, but women writers described being raped using euphemisms, such as "He did what he wanted from me" and "I fall asleep and my brother does what he wants … "

Women who were abused by their husbands were routinely told to not leave home, to put up with his behavior, and that they were guilty of failing their husbands which was why they behaved violently towards them. Women wrote to describe being victims of gender violence. One woman, who described herself as a wretched wife whose husband beat her in front of her 10-year-old daughter, was told to, "Be brave, do not neglect your personal arrangement for a moment. And when he gets home, be willing to please him whenever he asks." Another woman talked about how her neighbor made her 15-year-old daughter pregnant, with Elena's advice being to give the child up for adoption. Another woman wrote in to say, "When I was 9 years old, my brother-in-law took advantage of my sexual curiosity to make me lose my purity." Elena Francis told this woman to confess, as she was partly to blame as she had sinned and encouraged her to continue to living in the home where the violation took place. One woman wrote asking what to do when she saw her husband out with his mistress, with Elena's response being, "If you see them together again, do not get upset; pretend that and offer the sacrifice to the Lord."

Another teenaged girl from Barcelona wrote in to say of her father, "I have to wait with resignation the day I do not doubt my father would hit me or step on my face as one day he did and I would be forever disgraced." The advice to women who were rape victims or victims of gender violence was that they should stay, endure and offer their suffering up to God.

==== The Women's Protection Board ====
The Board for the Protection of Women or Women's Protection Board (Spanish: Patronato de Protección a la Mujer) was a public institution in Francoist Spain, established in 1941 under the Ministry of Justice. Notorious for its human rights violations, baby abductions, and brutality, the Board targeted girls and young women, confining them in reformatories as part of the broader Francoist repression. It persisted during the democratic Transition and wasn't eventually dismantled until well into the first government of Felipe González.

During the Francoist period, this institution had closed internment centers, generally run by Catholic religious orders, which could confine girls and young women deemed 'fallen or at risk of falling', even without having committed any crime. They could be admitted to these centers starting at age 16 through police raids, for "immoral behavior," arbitrary reports from family members and individuals ("guardians of morals"), requests from civil and religious authorities, or at the request of the women themselves or their parents. In practice, however, girls as young as 11 were forcibly interned. Young women and girls were routinely trafficked to men and forced to bear children, only to have their babies stolen immediately afterwards.

==== Antonio González Pacheco (Billy the Kid) ====
Antonio González Pacheco, also known as Billy the Kid, was a Social Political Brigade policeman. Decorated for a medal for police merit, he was known for his enjoyment of imposing terror, particularly on women, that he professionally came into contact with while investigating or arresting them. One of his victims was Lidia Falcón.

One alleged incident took place in 1975 involving an 18-year-old girl name Rosa García Alcón who belonged to the Spanish Democratic University Federation (FUDE), Revolutionary Antifascist and Patriotic Front (FRAP). She said of her experience with González Pacheco following her arrest by two policemen that summer, "What I remember most was his mouth, very big, how he approached my face and yelled at me … more than fear it made me sick, it smelled very bad, it was very unpleasant, I do not remember asking anything, he just hit me like a crazy man. […] He used to call me a bitch, a slut, he was very contemptuous of women, very macho, and he enjoyed imposing terror, I could see it in his eyes." She went on to say, "One night they took me out in a car, Billy the Kid and three other police officers were saying that they were going to show me a safe house they had located, and they threatened me saying that they were going to take me to the Casa de Campo, to rape and leave me out there, that my family would never know about me again. […] Imagine, when I had just turned 18, handcuffed in a car with four men … I was a girl, when they threw me on the floor in interrogations, like I was wearing a dress, they said 'look, what the bitch teaches us', those sort of things."

Felisa Echegoyen was another González Pacheco survivor. She had just destroyed documentation about her political affiliations before González Pacheco broke into her house. She said of this, "He would approach your face and take your breath, which was repulsive because it smelled like alcohol. This was something he did a lot with women; he wanted to make us smaller, as if he were a monster."

Complaints against his ill-treatment of prisoners had been made to the police by 1974, but had not been acted on, even after the start of the democratic transition. The complaints, while he was still employed, would eventually total to 17. In 1974, the Municipal Court Number 19 in Madrid sentenced González Pacheco single day in prison and fined him 1,000 pesetas for abuse by Enrique Aguilar Benítez de Lugo. Other proceedings against her were dismissed as a result of the 1977 Amnesty Law.

In February 1975, Communist Youth member María Rumín was a 17-year-old when she became another one of his victims while she was defending free and quality publish schools at Plaza del Parterre in Carabanchel. She said of this, "Just to hear the name of Billy the Kid, my hair stood on end. I was detained for three days in the Puerta del Sol police station. No one warned my family and no one gave information about my whereabouts during those three days. My hair is still standing on end when I remember those days. Just to hear the name Billy the Kid makes my hair stand on end." González Pacheco broke her face by hitting it with his fists. González Pacheco also stole some of the money Rumín had on her when she entered detention.

=== Democratic transition period (1975 - 1986) ===
Franco died in November 1975. The first protest condemning violence against women was held in Barcelona in 1976. Women marched, chanting phrases like "Against rape, castration" (Spanish: Contra violación, castración), "We want to walk calmly" (Spanish: Queremos caminar tranquilas), "Let's make our night" (Spanish: Hagamos nuestra la noche), "Alone, drunk, I want to go home" (Spanish: Sola, borracha, quiero volver a casa) and "Enough of violations!" (Spanish: ¡Basta de violaciones!). At the time, rape was not treated as a serious institutional problem inside Spain, and rape victims had few rights.

The issue of age of consent was before the Congress in April 1978. It was changed from eighteen, to between twelve and sixteen. Between those ages, consent was allowed only if the other person did not have authority over the younger person. Issues around women's honesty as it related to rape accusations also disappeared in 1978. The Socialists also successfully got articles 436 and 442 repealed from the criminal code in April 1978. Reforms in the law in 1978 meant men could also be considered victims of rape. That year, contraception also became legal. Divorce also became legal in 1981.

A reform in 1983 said that a victim offering forgiveness to the perpetrator would not result in the dropping of criminal proceedings in the cases of rape, sexual abuse and kidnapping. Thefts of children from female political prisoners continued into the early 1980s. These mothers were often told their children were born dead, or had serious illness at birth and subsequently died. In 1987, Spain's Supreme Court ruled that rape victims did not need to prove they actively fought off their rapist to lodge a complaint.

=== Post Francoist Spain (1985 - present) ===
In the modern era, it is understood that the type of violence women experienced in the Spanish Civil War is common, having occurred throughout history in places like Troy and into the modern day in places like Darfur. Spain's has been criticized for "the complete forgetfulness within the law of the Historical Memory of the crimes against humanity against republican women." Prior to the 1990s, there was no way to tell in Spain that number of women who were killed by their boyfriends or husbands. The abuse and murder of women in Spain was a form of sexist terrorism and claimed more victims than that of ETA. El caso de los niños perdidos del franquismo by Miguel Ángel Rodríguez Arias ends with a demand that the Spanish government start "the opening of an effective and independent official investigation of all its crimes, as required by the European Court of Human Rights, which will lead to the clarification of the facts and the criminal prosecution of those responsible."

In 2010, the Junta de Andalusia compensated women who were forced to swallow castor oil or had their hair shave or forced to walk naked through their towns with €1,800. This compensation was a result of the Historical Memory Board of Andalusia. Similar compensations were offered to other victims of historical repression during the Spanish Civil War in Andalusia. Of the 2,742 people who received compensation under this scheme, only 5% were women.

On 16 March 2016, a case about Francoist sexual and gender violence was filed, citing human rights violations, in Argentina. The case was brought by Women's Link and was to be heard by María Servini de Cubría, the only Argentine judge reviewing Franco era human rights violations in the country. Of the six women named in the suit, five were murdered. They were Margalida Jaume Vendrel, Daria and Mercedes Buzadé Adroher, Pilar Sánchez Lladrés and Matilde Lanza Vaz. The other woman was Lidia Falcón, who was imprisoned repeatedly between 1960 and 1974. Glenys de Jesús said of Women's Link's need to file this, saying, "both for the crimes already reported within the cause and for which Women's Link adds now, apply a perspective that takes into account that violence that was used against women and men was direct, had a different impact, and a different meaning." She went on to say that, "not only of a different brutality, but also had a clear objective, which was to punish those women that the regime considered had broken with their social position." She continued, saying the goal of Francoist was to, "send a message of pressure to the whole society of what the model of female behavior should be and at the same time they used women to punish the men of the Republican side."

A new line of investigation into sexual abuse by the Franco regime was admitted in the National Criminal and Correctional Court No. 1 of Buenos Aires in October 2018. A more general case about human rights violations by the regime had first been opened in Argentina in 2010.

Antonio González Pacheco benefited from the Amnesty Law in October 1977. Argentine Justice placed an international arrest warrant for González Pacheco in 2013 as part of their broader investigation into human rights abuses by the Francoist regime. People first tried to bring charges in Spain against Antonio González Pacheco in the Spain's National Court in 2014. González Pacheco was finally investigated in 2018 as a result of seven complaints filed in Madrid that alleged crimes against humanity. Only one of the seven cases was investigated for torture related offenses. The government argued against the cases being accepted as his actions and those of other men in the Spanish police were not part of a systemic pattern designed to repress a specific part of the population. González Pacheco was never stripped of any of his honors by the Spanish state, despite the allegations later made against him.

== See also ==
- Francoist Spain
- Lost children of Francoism
- National Catholicism
- Sección Femenina
- White Terror (Spain)
- Women prisoners in Francoist Spain
- Women's Protection Board
