= Victoria Zárate Zurita =

Spanish teacher and trade unionist

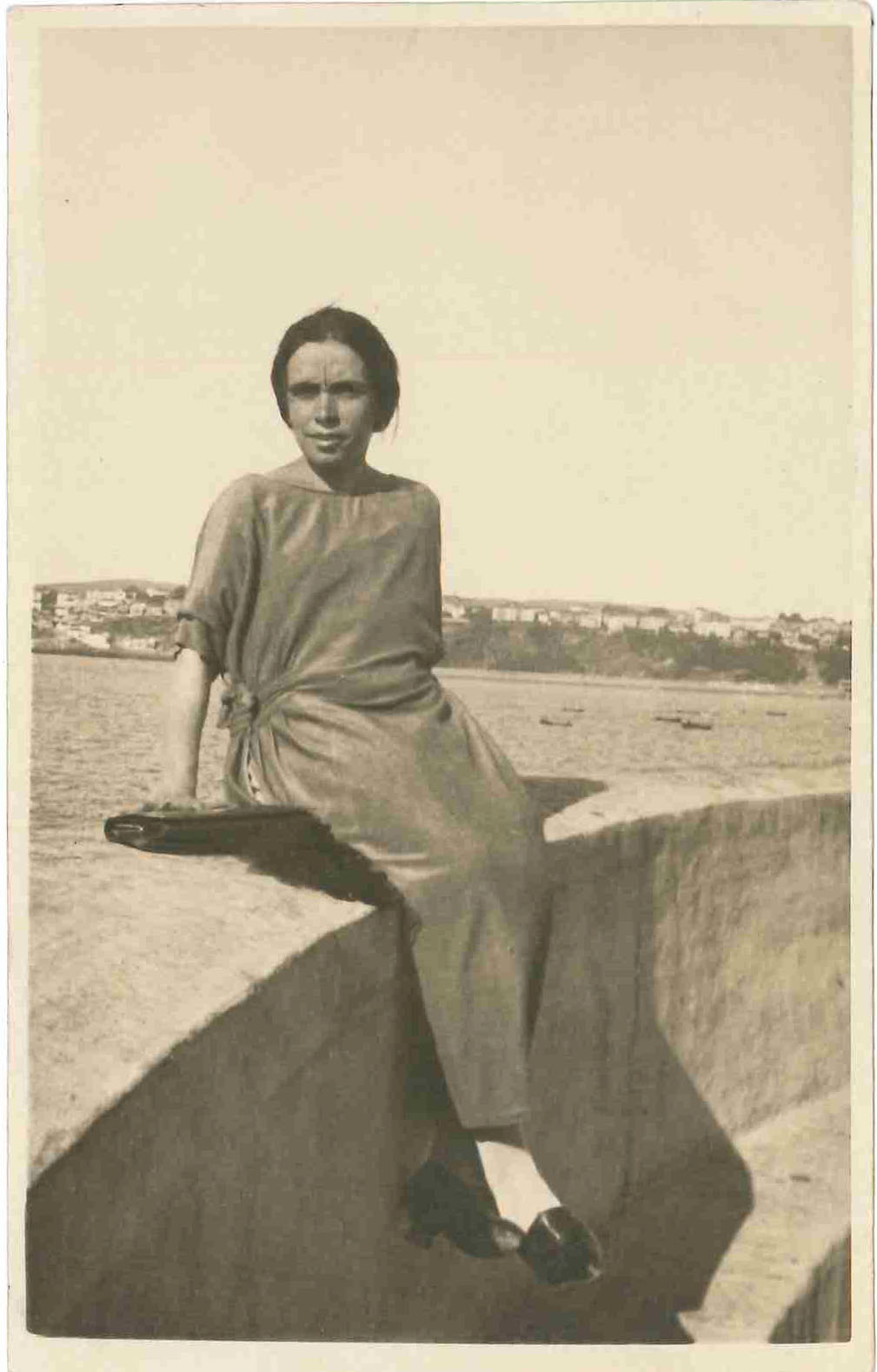
- Victoria Zárate Zurita (undated)
- Born: October 7, 1893; Madrid, Spain
- Died: December 6, 1964 (aged 71); Lisbon, Portugal
- Occupations: teacher and trade unionist, of socialist and communist ideology
- Known for: tortured and imprisoned by Franco's regime

Victoria Zárate Zurita (Madrid, October 7, 1893 - Lisbon, December 6, 1964) was a Spanish republican teacher and trade unionist, of socialist and communist ideology, who was tortured and imprisoned by Franco's regime.

== Biography ==
Victoria Zárate Zurita was born in Madrid, Spain.

She studied teaching at the Escuela Normal de Madrid from 1912 to 1915. From April 1916, she worked at the Escuela Graduada de Niñas No. 4, in the Bailén School Group in Madrid, where she stayed until 1922, the year in which she exchanged her position with the teacher in Cadalso de los Vidrios (Madrid).

She joined the General Association of Teachers of the Unión General de Trabajadores (UGT) in 1918. She participated as a delegate of the Federación de Trabajadores de la Enseñanza (FETE) in the XIV Congress of the UGT held in 1920 together with the pedagogue Lorenzo Luzuriaga, among others. At this congress, the educational program of the UGT was created, which was one of the germs of what later became the educational program of the Second Spanish Republic.

She belonged to the Radical Socialist Republican Party, although later, at the beginning of the Civil War, she joined the Communist Party. In 1931, she distributed to the deputies who were drafting the constitution a manifesto calling for the Republic to be totally secular. She distributed it together with Victoriana Herrero, Enriqueta Echevarría, and Concepción Martín de Antonio, all representatives of left-wing political forces. That same year, Zárate Zurita participated in the Ateneo de Madrid in the homage to the teacher Cayetano Ripoll, the last victim of the Inquisition, on the occasion of the centenary of his death, with a dissertation on La religión en la escuela. In 1932, she was a member of the pedagogy commission of that institution, presided over by the anthropologist Luis de Hoyos Sainz, and was reelected for several years.

She participated in the founding of the New Education Movement in Spain; affiliated to the International of the same name. She was part of its first executive board as treasurer on April 5, 1931, together with Luzuriaga as president, Manuel Bartolomé Cossío and Américo Castro, among others. In 1931, she was elected member of the executive committee of FETE presided by Rodolfo Llopis.

On February 11, 1933, Zárate Zurita signed the manifesto of the founding of the International Association of Friends of the Soviet Union with the aim of disseminating the progress made in that country. Along with her, renowned people from both the political and intellectual spheres signed: the writers Antonio Machado, Federico García Lorca, Concha Espina. and the politicians Clara Campoamor and Victoria Kent, among others.

When the Spanish coup of July 1936 occurred, Zárate Zurita worked at the José Espronceda School Group in Madrid. That same year, she was appointed vice-president of the Junta Central de Huérfanos del Magisterio, a position she held until 1939. In January 1937, she was appointed administrative director of the Instituto Obrero de Valencia.

In July 1939, she returned to Madrid where she was arrested and, after being tortured, was sentenced to 12 years in prison. She was imprisoned in Bilbao for two years, after which she returned to Madrid on parole and devoted herself to private teaching. In March 1953, her depuration file was reviewed and she was reinstated to the service with the sanction of "postponement in the ranks for two years, transfer out of the province for five years and disqualification to hold positions of leadership and trust".

== Death and legacy ==
Victoria Zárate Zurita died in Lisbon, Portugal on December 6, 1964.

The Instituto Obrero Cultural Association annually awards the Victoria Zarate Zurita prize. The award recognizes the work of the students of Contemporary history internships at the University of Valencia, who are trained in this association.

== See also ==
- Women in 1940s Spain
- Women prisoners in Francoist Spain
- Women in the Communist Party of Spain in the Spanish Civil War
