= Women prisoners in Francoist Spain =

Women prisoners in Francoist Spain were often there because of specific repression aimed at women. During the Civil War, many women were in prison because family members had Republican sympathies or the authorities wanted to lure out male Republican affiliated relatives; it was not a result of anything the women did themselves. The Law of Political Responsibilities, adopted on 13 February 1939, made such repression easier and was not formally removed from the Criminal Code until 1966. Prisoners and people in concentration camps, both male and female, would total over three quarters of a million by the end of the Spanish Civil War. Of these, 14,000 women were held in the Las Ventas Model prison in Madrid.

The official start of the Francoist period in late 1939 saw the continuation of specific repression against women through the prison system and the death penalty. Pregnancy did not allow women to escape either execution or unsanitary conditions that led to high rates of infant death. Women could also find themselves incarcerated in reformatories without trial for violating female morality in a parallel prison-type system. Housed in overcrowded conditions, women were forced to support Catholicism if they were to avoid harassment or obtain benefits. They were threatened with hunger and ran the risk of contracting diseases like typhus.

During the democratic transition period, women took to the streets to demand freedom for political prisoners. Partial amnesty came in late 1976, with a general amnesty in 1977. In post-Francoist Spain, female prisoners have largely been forgotten as victims of regime repression. Bones of many female Francoist victims remain scattered throughout the countryside. In 2014, an Argentine court began investigating abuses suffered by some women at the hands of Antonio González Pacheco in Madrid while they were incarcerated.

== History ==
=== Francoist forces in the Civil War period (1936–1939) ===
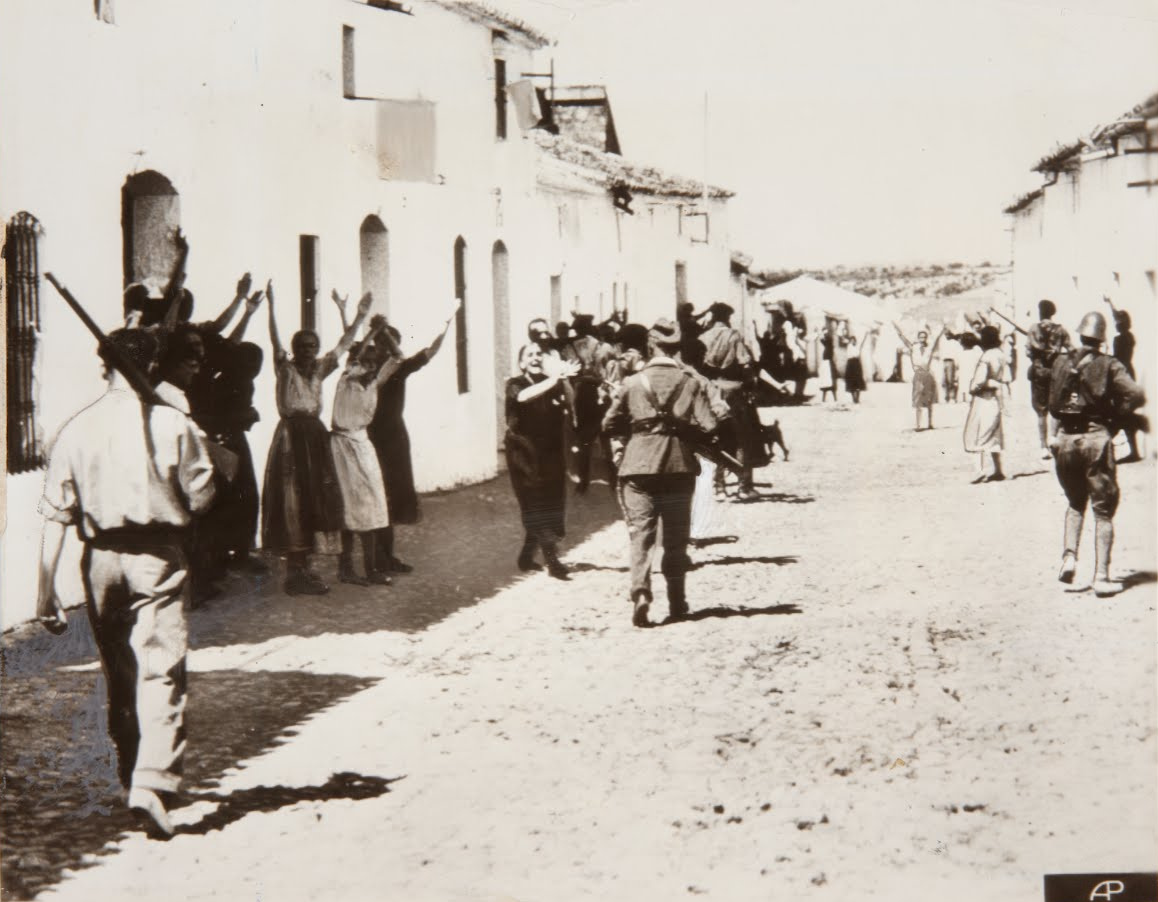
Women pleading with Nationalists for the lives of prisoners in Constantina, Seville in 1936.

The Franco regime organized reprisals against women from the start of the Civil War. Many of the women had committed no wrongdoing and were targeted only because they had family members with Republican sympathies. That was particularly true of housewives who found themselves in prison. Matilde Eiroa commented, "They were often used as bait to attract the men of the family who fled." War councils proscribed punishments, and of the people they ordered executed, 5% were women. Women were victims of Franco's repression. More than 100 were sentenced to death by the war councils and executed, many of them in Madrid and Andalusia. The best known case in Spain is Las Trece Rosas, who were shot in August 1939. Many wives, widows, sisters or daughters of republicans were humiliated and punished "with marching through the streets of the town and the dispossession of their property."

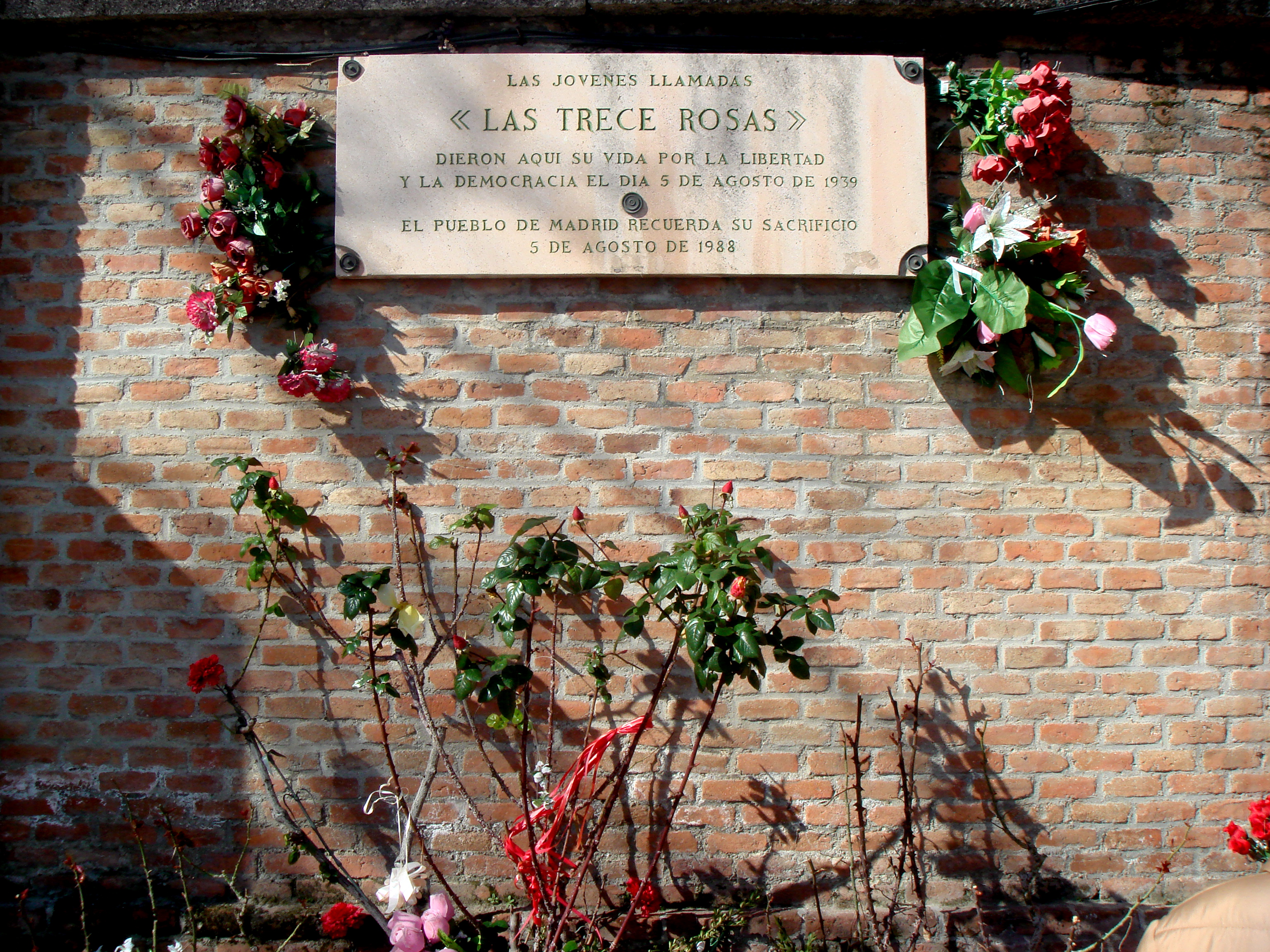
Plaque in the cemetery wall in honor of Las Trece Rosas.

The Law of Political Responsibilities (Spanish: Ley de Responsabilidades Políticas) was issued by the Francoist dictatorship on 13 February 1939 two months before the end of the Spanish Civil War. The Law targeted all loyalist supporters of the Second Spanish Republic and penalized membership in the Popular Front of the defeated republic. The law declared guilty of a crime of military rebellion, all those who were members of a Popular Front party from 1 October 1934 and all of those who had opposed the military Coup d'état of the 17–18 July including all the government officers of the Republic and all the members of the Republican Armed Forces. The law was retroactive and could be applied as far back as October 1934, a juridical aberration, for those who had followed the laws of the legally constituted Government of the Spanish Republic. They were suddenly prosecuted for "helping rebellion".

The Law of Political Responsibilities established fines and expropriations for defendants and their families (from 100 pesetas to the confiscation of all the accused's assets). Furthermore, additional penalties included restriction of professional activities, limitation of freedom of residence, and forfeiture of Spanish citizenship. Deceased and disappeared persons could be held responsible and their families inherited the economic sanctions.

By 1939, there were officially over 270,000 prisoners in Spain. There were also around 500,000 people in concentration camps. When people were detained, Franco used them as cheap slave labor. Among those in camps, 90,000 were in worker battalions. Another 47,000 were in military battalions. Of these, 13,779 were involved in urban reconstruction projects while 9,500 of those involved in military battalions worked on fortifications, while another 8,898 worked on re-cooping war materials. Many of these prisoners and concentration camp victims were women. By the end of the war, the Nationalist run women's only Las Ventas Model prison in Madrid had over 14,000 women. More than 190 concentration camps, holding 170,000 prisoners in 1938 and between 367,000 and about half a million prisoners remaineded when the war ended in 1939. Most of the camps were created during Spanish Civil War, only a few being created in the following years. Hostal de San Marcos de León concentration camp held 7,000 men and 300 women from 1936 until 1939.

Caserón de la Goleta, the prison for women in Málaga, held thousands of women over its history. Women found themselves there for a wide variety of offenses including infidelity, divorce or lesbian relationships. They were there also because the state determined they were delinquents, alcoholics, psychopaths or "degenerate" women. For women imprisoned in the earliest period of the prison's history, they had no ability to defend themselves, as they were there as a result of war council sentences. The conditions for the 4,000 female prisoners at Caserón de la Goleta were horrible and unhygienic, with prisoners crammed into small spaces that helped to spread disease.

=== Francoist period (1939–1975) ===
In the first days of the Francoist period, it was a crime to be a mother, daughter, sister or wife of a "red", and this could be punished with long prison sentences or death. The Law of Political Responsibilities, reformed in 1942 and in force until 1966, was promulgated in order to give a legal cover to the repression carried out during the dismantlement of the Spanish republican institutions, as well as to penalize those who had remained loyal to the legally established government at the time of the July 1936 military rebellion against the Spanish Republic. The punishment for being a female relative of a "red" male was resurrected between 1945 and 1947, when there was a surge in guerrilla activity. This resulted in a large number of rural women swelling the ranks of Spanish prisons, including in women's prisons in Madrid, Córdoba, Málaga and Segovia. They had received sentences of 20 to 30 years merely for feeding "red" male relatives. Age did not matter, as girls as young as nine were sent to prison where they would be physically assaulted by guards.

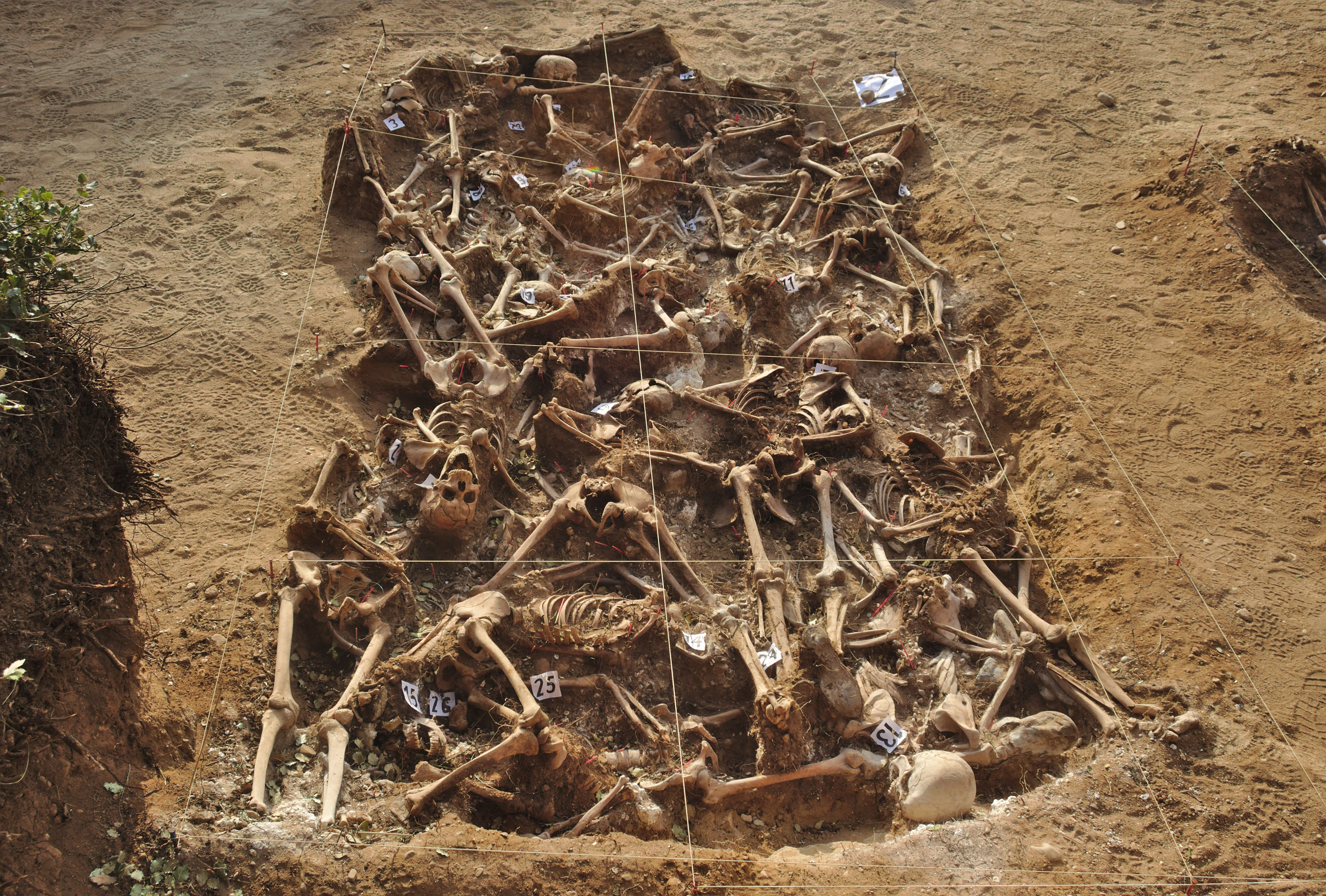
Common grave in Estépar, province of Burgos, with 26 victims of the Republican side. The excavation took place in the months of July and August 2014.

Republican women were also victims of the repression in postwar Spain. Thousands of women suffered public humiliation (being paraded naked through the streets, being shaved and forced to ingest castor oil so they would soil themselves in public), sexual harassment and rape. In many cases, the houses and goods of the widows of Republicans were confiscated by the government. Thus, many Republican women, living in total poverty, were forced into prostitution. According to Paul Preston, "The increase in prostitution both benefited Francoist men who thereby slaked their lust and also reassured them that 'red' women were a fount of dirt and corruption". Furthermore, thousands of women were executed (for example the 13 roses) among them pregnant women. One judge said: "We cannot wait seven months to execute a woman".

From the 1940s to the 1980s, families, religious figures and strangers could all report women to the authorities for violating female morality. These women then could then be imprisoned without trial in reformatories. Examples of the reasons women were incarcerated included "having gone with the comparsas of the Marisol Film Artist" and "not obeying her mother. She likes the street a lot and does not want to work." These reformatories did not close until the 1980s, and only then as a result of abuse documented by the women involved.

Prisoners at Caserón de la Goleta were between 13 and 85 years old, the vast majority between 21 and 40. 38% were known to be married, while 17% were single and 18% widowed, the remainder having unknown marital status. Because of a desire to protect their family or out of antipathy towards the church, some women did not to reveal their marital status to the authorities. Most of the women in the prison were illiterate; the prison did not try to teach them and instead focused on giving them gender-specific jobs like sewing which did not require literacy skills.

The Law of Political Responsibilities was only nominally repealed in February 1945. A Comisión Liquidadora de Responsabilidades Políticas (Commission for the Discharge of Political Responsibilities) remained in operation until 1966 when the law was effectively abolished. Between 1939 and 1945, 500,000 persons out a population of 23,000,000 (2% of the population of Spain) were subject to Political Responsibilities proceedings. To relieve prison overcrowding, concentration camps were opened, where prisoners were forced to engage in manual labor. Because of economic problems in the 1950s and as part of efforts to appear less totalitarian abroad, the regime released many women from prison.

During the 1940s, there was an increase in the number of women in Málaga sentenced to Caserón de la Goleta for crimes related to food acquisition. There was a severe shortage of food in the city and typhus was common. Women would arrive at the prison and happily suck on orange peel because that was more than was available on the streets of Málaga. There was no protection from typhus and other diseases which continued to spread throughout the prison as women were placed six to a room designed for two. The prison closed in 1954, with its prisoners moved to a provincial jail on the Cártama road. The Local Police Headquarters in Malaga were later built in the facility that held Caserón de la Goleta.

One way to leave prison early was for women to convert to Catholicism and demonstrate repentance. This type of early release was not a result of prison conduct or prison officials, but of Catholic priests who acted as agents for Franco. Even with early release promised, women would often have to wait for high holy days to actually be released. Nuns in charge of left-wing prisoners could be particularly cruel. They shaved the heads of women and forced them to drink castor oil. They coerced women to accept the Catholic faith. They monitored prisoners compliance with Catholic rites. Nuns were culpable in the stolen children scandal, assisting the state in removing children from "red" mothers.
Women in prisons often had many problems with hygiene that were compounded during menstruation. Their jailers had little sympathy for them, simply using their condition to humiliate them. During the 1940s and 1950s, Francoism allowed for prisoners to be redeemed by the Church. Consequently, promulgating the faith was often made a condition of release. One rule required that for prisoners with children to receive subsidies, they needed to be married. As a result, many women married behind bars and had their children baptized as Roman Catholics.

An intake file of a teenager named Ana María in 1948 in Seville who had been placed into government care for her own protection.

Most of the resistance in Spain during the early Francoist period was a result of guerrillas who coordinated their activities in the interior both with political militants in exile and with militants in prison. Most of Spain's militant women who remained in Spain were in prison or had gone underground where they served as important figures in coordinating activities between all three groups. Prisons in this case proved invaluable for many militant women as they allowed them to rebuild their activist networks or create new ones. They were also one of the biggest sources of female resistance to the Franco regime by exercising daily resistance behind prison walls.

Many women and some men were imprisoned for adultery. They were rarely discussed. In re-education programs at women's prisons, Sección Feminina taught things such as "When your husband returns from work, offer to take off his shoes. If you have a hobby, try not to bore him by talking about it; if you should apply facial cream or hair curlers, wait until he is asleep; if he suggests joining an activity, then humbly agree."

Caserón de la Goleta, the women's prison in Málaga, had horrible conditions for women prisoners. Women were packed into tiny, unhygienic cubicles where conditions were so bad that they facilitated the spread of disease. Food often consisted of fruit peels or edible waste. A third of the prisoners by the end of 1939 were there on charges of committing faults against the regime. Many of those remaining were there as retaliation for relatives having disappeared or fled into exile. Guards, and visiting church and regime officials would often sexually assault female prisoners.

During the Francoist period, Caserón de la Goleta frequently faced food shortages and many children prisoners died of starvation. Prisoners were often served dumplings made of legumes that were banned in 1967 because they were so toxic. Female prisoners also were given fruits and vegetables that were unwashed and unpeeled. This led to women developing ulcers and stomach pains. Women in the prison finally had enough and went on a hunger strike. The results were minor, women only gaining the addition of some clean potatoes and other cleaned vegetables. Women also later held another protest, this one over the lack of shower facilities. They succeeded in getting another shower but still had to contend with a facility without any hot water. Luisa, a prisoner there, said of her experiences, "Life there was horrible. There were only eight women when I arrived, but it soon filled up. The food, the vigilantes, the death of the compañeras, the interrogations, the punishment cells ... There are many things to tell."

The Women's Prison of Les Corts in Barcelona held thousands of women between 1939 and 1955. It was run by a Catholic religious order. In its first year, 11 women from the prison were executed at Campo de la Bota. That first year, the prison held 2,000 female prisoners and at least 40 children. During the 1940s, women were forced to work in the prison's orchard. During the 1950s, they worked in a sewing workshop. The prison was closed in October 1955, with its 263 female prisoners and 19 children being transferred to Barcelona's Model Prison. Prostitutes were held at facilities run by nuns through Patronato de Proteccion a la Mujer from 1941 to 1985. They were always a minority, representing between 7 and 10% of the population. They would be put into cells next to girls abandoned by their families, spending only a few nights. According to Carlos Álvarez, a researcher at the University of the Basque Country, "Their confinement fulfilled two objectives: on the one hand to separate them from the rest of society so that they did not influence it, and on the other to be 'rehabilitated', along the path of redemption."

Frente Armado Feminista was a feminist group created around 1970, dedicated to the violent overthrow of the Franco regime. Its members included Isabel Grau, Inés Fuentes Fernández, Marta Aguilar Gallego, Pilar Ortega García and Maite Caballero Hidalgo. The Valencia-based group had plans to attack an annex at the Trinitat Vella women's prison in Barcelona run by the nuns of the Crusades of Christ the King. As none in the group had connections to student movements or unionist activities, they believed they were safe from state surveillance. The group created their own manifesto of their demands for the regime as it related to the rights of women. Police discovered their plans, and the women tried to hide all evidence of their documents, manifestos, books and magazines. Nonetheless, they still found their copy of The Manual of the Urban Guerrilla. The police violently beat the women, and in the coming days, most would die as a result of suicide or extrajudicial killings. Consequently, following this incident and the detention of other PCE-connected students and staff, the Governing Board of the University of Valencia started enacting repressive policies against teachers, refusing to renew their teaching contracts for political reasons and enacting sanctions against the students.

Women were held at the Madrid offices of General Directorate of Security during the early 1970s. Some women at the facility were tortured by Antonio González Pacheco. They included Felisa Echegoyen and Ángela Gutiérrez.

==== Specific prisoners ====
María Lacrampe had joined UGT in 1932 and become involved with the 1934 Asturian Revolution. In November 1937, she became the secretary of the Asociación Socialista de Madrid. As part of her work, she helped bringing Spanish Republican children into exile in Belgium. At the conclusion of the war, she unsuccessfully tried to escape via boat, claiming she was a French citizen. By June 1939, she was in the Las Ventas Prison in Madrid, where she used her time to work as a nurse assisting children of other female prisoners.

Victoria Zárate Zurita had been a member of the executive committee of the UGT-aligned Federación de Trabajadores de la Enseñanza (FETE). She was arrested and savagely tortured while in prison. Valencia FETE executive committee member Ángela Semper was imprisoned from the end of the Civil War until 1944. Neither woman managed to escape Spain.

Matilde Landa was a prisoner at the Can Salas jail in Palma de Majorca. While at the prison from the time of her arrest during the Civil War to 1942, she was subjected to constant psychological torture at the hands of the Little Sisters of the Poor who attempted to convert her to Catholicism and punish her for her Republican ties. On 26 September 1942, after years of abuse in Can Salas, she committed suicide to escape the daily psychological torture.

Women who were affiliated with UGT were disappeared during the early Francoist period. Those UGT women who were in prison faced deplorable conditions. Ángeles Malonda was one of the UGT women imprisoned during the Franco regime as a result of her involvement with the union during the Civil War.

=== Democratic transition period (1975 - 1986) ===
Franco died in late 1975. During 1975 and 1976, one of the major goals of Spain's leftist political organizations was to gain political freedom and obtain amnesty for political prisoners. They were granted partial amnesty by September 1976. The issue of dual militancy raised problems for Primeras Jornadas por la Liberación de la Mujer. Some of the participants wanted to attend a general demonstration demanding the release of and amnesty for political prisoners at Madrid's Carabanchel prison. Other women wanted to protest in front of Madrid's Yeserías prison which housed women. After much discussion, the group decided not to suspend the Primeras Jornadas, and instead allow participants to choose either demonstration. This helped consolidate and unify the broader feminist movement.

Releasing all political prisoners was a part of the transition to democracy after the death of Francisco Franco in 1975. The freeing of political prisoners was part of the Spanish 1977 Amnesty Law, promulgated on 15 October 1977 and enforced on the 17th.

=== Post Francoist Spain (1985 — present) ===
Female prisoners have been highly critical of the history of the Spanish Civil War and the Francoist period. The communist leader Juana Doña said, "Women have been given just a few lines in the mass of volumes written about the Civil War." Lidia Falcón said, "For them the most beautiful and vibrant literary pages have been published. They are seldom mentioned in the plurality of words that is always masculine." Only a small plaque at the site of the Caserón de la Goleta prison exists to allow people to remember the suffering that took place by women at the prison.

Many of the victims of Francoist repression were buried in mass graves scattered throughout Spain, often outside the cemeteries and scattered throughout the countryside, and without their death being recorded in the civil registries. Since the early 2000s, various associations of victims of Franco as the Association for the Recovery of Historical Memory have been responsible for locating these pits to identify the remains of those executed and transfer them to their families for a decent burial. The law of historical memory, approved in December 2007, seeks to make effective the new rights recognized for the victims of the Franco regime on the same basis as the victims of the other side, omitting to recognize in practice the existence of the victims and mass graves produced by the Republican side. It has established a map of graves and victims that is constantly updated.

In 2014, an Argentinian judge issued warrant for the arrest of Antonio González Pacheco, a Spanish policeman accused of torturing prisoners during Franco's military rule, but the Spanish High Court refused to honor it explaining that time had run out in accordance with the statute of limitations.

== Teenage prisoners ==
Teenage girls could become wards of the state through the so-called Board for the Protection of Women. Starting in 1941 and lasting until 1985, girls were taken to centers run by nuns as part of a state goal to rehabilitate the "fallen". Some of these girls were dropped off by parents who just no longer wanted to care for them, such was the case of Raquel Castillo. Some girls were put into state custody because they were denounced by family members. Marian Torralbo was denounced by her brother, a member of Acción Católica, for partying. All were incarcerated without a trial. Women could not leave in many cases until they were 25-years-old, when they reached legal adult maturity for women.

Girls put into these reformatories were subject to virginity tests conducted by nuns. This was done on a daily basis, with girls forced to sit on a hospital bed where a doctor would ask them if they were a virgin. After they said yes, the doctor would imply they were liars and then put a stick up a girl's vagina to check without her consent. Many girls became hysterical during this process. The law changed in 1985 around girls taken into state custody, and no longer allowed minors to be placed under the control of the state for their own protection. Following this, all remaining reformatories were closed.

== Pregnant prisoners ==
Pregnant women in prison in the early Franco period were beaten badly, often with the intention of causing an abortion. Pregnant women would be forced to give birth in unsanitary prison conditions, and infant mortality was a problem with many infants dying. At the Nationalist run women's only Las Ventas Model prison in Madrid, many women in prison were raped by guards and became pregnant as a result. This had swollen the size of the prison to include a further 12,000 Republican child prisoners.

María Topete Fernández was part of prison leadership at the Prison for Nursing Mothers in Madrid. Held up as a model for being the first of its kind in Europe, the prison had problems with infant mortality. While the Law of Maternal and Infant Health in June 1941 reduced infant deaths by a small fraction, imprisoned Republican women would not see any improved rates until 1943, significant improvements occurring only in 1952 when the prison's rationing system was abandoned.

== Stolen children ==
In November 1940, the Ministry of the Interior published a decree on war orphans, namely the children of parents shot or missing (exiles, forgotten in prisons, fugitives and clandestine cases), according to which only "irreproachable persons under religious, ethical and national considerations" could obtain their guardianship. In December 1941, a law allowed children who did not remember their name, who had been repatriated or whose parents could not be located, to be entered in the Civil Registry under a new name. This facilitated irregular adoption. The practice extended through the entire period of the Franco dictatorship.

The order of instruction made by Criminal Investigation Court No. 5 of the Spanish National Audience put the number of children of republican detainees whose identities were supposedly changed in the Civil Registry and who were delivered to families supporting the Francoist regime at 30,960 in the period between 1944 and 1954. Spanish associations put the number of stolen children between 1940 and 1990 at closer to 300,000. According to a study published by Ricard Vinyes, between 1944 and 1945, the Patronage of San Pablo accounted for 30,000 children of incarcerated and exiled children, to whom 12,000 would have to be added, protected by the Patronato de la Merced.

In its declaration condemning the Franco dictatorship of 17 March 2006 (Recommendation 1736, points 72, 73, 74 and 75), the Council of Europe said that the "lost children" are victims of Francoism, since their "surnames they were modified to allow their adoption by families addicted to the regime". It also affirmed that " the Franco regime invoked the 'protection of minors', but the idea that applied to this protection was not distinguished from a punitive regime", and that "they were frequently separated from the other categories of children interned in State Institutions and subjected to physical and psychological abuse".

== Children of prisoners ==
Children of prisoners were taught in Catholic schools, as part of efforts to indoctrinate them in regime ideology, that their parents were in prison because they were traitors to the state. On the orders of Antonio Vallejo Nágera, children of women at Madrid's women-only Las Ventas prison were removed from their mothers and put into orphanages in order to prevent them being contaminated by "Marxist fanaticism."

The regime encouraged the separation of children from their mothers when they were imprisoned. When children born in prison reached three years of age (which was not common when they intentionally received a hypocaloric diet that caused high mortality), and when there were no relatives who could take care of them, they were "protected" by the Feminine Section of the Falange, and in particular the Patterns of Redemption of Penalties that were charged with educating the children of the detainees.
