= Marcos Ana =

Spanish poet

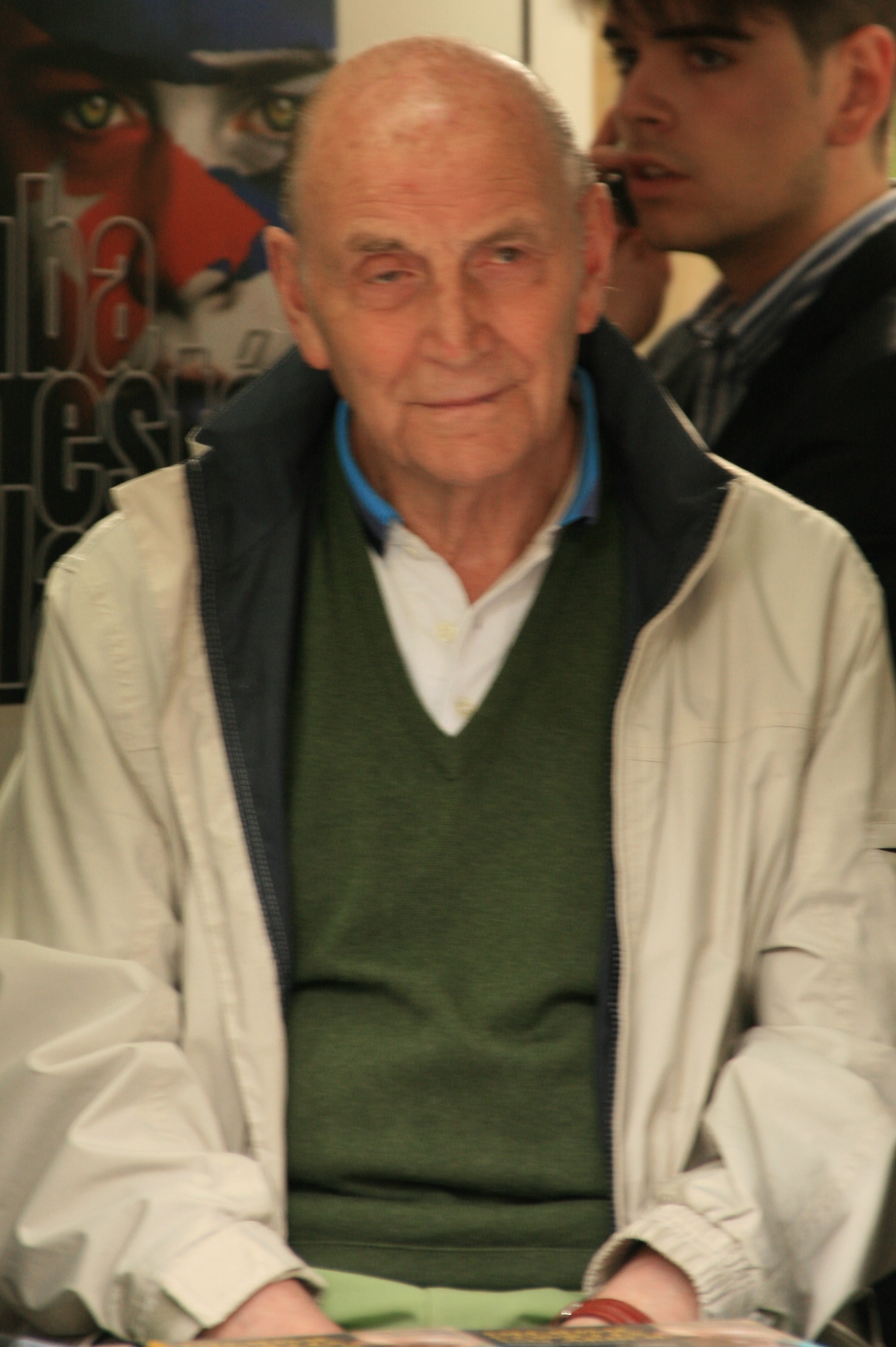
Marcos Ana in Madrid (June 2009)

Fernando Macarro Castillo (20 January 1920 in Alconada – 24 November 2016 in Madrid), better known by his pseudonym Marcos Ana, was a Spanish poet and is considered by numerous sources Spain's longest serving political prisoner. Under the dictatorship of Francoist Spain, he was convicted of the murder of three people (a priest, a postman and a farmer) at the age of 19 in 1939, crimes he always denied having committed. He was released in 1961 after 23 years of imprisonment.

He spent 23 years in prison, longer than any other republican combatant, being released in 1961 and exiled in Paris. He told his story in the 2007 memoir Tell Me What a Tree Is Like

He was born in the hamlet of San Vicente, which belongs to the municipality of Alconada in Salamanca, although he spent his childhood in Ventosa del Río Almar, also in the same province, within a very poor family of day laborers, deeply Catholic. The youngest of four siblings, Fernando Macarro spent his childhood in Ventosa del Río Almar with his parents. His older siblings emigrated to Alcalá de Henares, and in the early 1930s, his older sister Margarita secured a job for his father in the town of Alcalá, prompting Fernando and his parents to move there. His education was limited, and at the age of twelve or thirteen, he left school and began working as a shop assistant to contribute to the family income. At barely sixteen, he joined the Socialist Youth, which shortly before the Civil War became the Unified Socialist Youth (JSU), under the communist umbrella. Alongside this, he gradually abandoned religion.

He joined the front at the outbreak of the Spanish Civil War in 1936, in the "Liberty" militia battalion of the JSU, fighting in the Peguerinos area of the Sierra de Guadarrama during the early days of the conflict. When the militias were militarized and the Republican Army was formed, he was forced to leave the battlefield because he was underage. Marcos Ana returned to Alcalá de Henares, where he became the general secretary of the JSU in the region. During the war, he joined the Communist Party of Spain. In January 1937, his father died in a Legion Condor bombing over Alcalá. Macarro couldn't join the regular army until he turned 18 in 1938. He worked as a political commissioner in the 44th Mixed Brigade (stationed in El Pardo) and later as a political instructor for the youth in the 8th Division of the Central Army, also in El Pardo, a role he held until the end of the war. Before the total siege of the capital, he managed to escape towards Levante, like many other Republican army leaders, Popular Front organizations, or Republic state officials. Like many others, Macarro arrived at the port of Alicante hoping for rescue by a ship. Unable to reach any vessel due to the Francoist naval blockade, he surrendered to the Italian units (the Littorio Division) encircling the port on March 31 and was captured and confined, first in the Almendros prisoner camp, and later in the Albatera concentration camp. A few days later, he escaped and made his way back to Madrid, where he was detained again a week after arriving, having been betrayed by a police informant.

== See also ==
- Political prisoners in Francoist Spain
