= Women's Protection Board =

Defunct Spanish institution

The Board for the Protection of Women or Women's Protection Board (Spanish: Patronato de Protección a la Mujer) was a public institution in Francoist Spain, established in 1941 under the Ministry of Justice. Infamous for its brutality, human rights violations, and involvement in baby abductions, the Board targeted girls and young women, confining them in reformatories as part of the broader Francoist repression. The institution remained active in post-Francoist Spain, and was only fully dismantled well into the first government of Felipe González.

During Franco's regime, the Board operated closed internment centers, usually run by Catholic religious orders, which confined girls and young women considered "fallen" or "at risk of falling," even if they had committed no crime. At its peak, these centers simultaneously held more than 41,000 girls and young women—around 1.7% of all females aged 15–24 in Spain at the time. Admissions could occur from age 16, triggered by police raids against "immoral behavior", arbitrary accusations by relatives or self-appointed "guardians of morals", requests from civil and religious authorities, or even by personal request from parents or the young women themselves. In practice, however, girls as young as 11 were forcibly interned.

The Patronato was structured into a National Board—whose honorary president was the dictator's wife, Carmen Polo—and fifty provincial boards.

In 1996, a large number of documents related to the Board and the whereabouts of babies born in its centers went missing.

== History ==
In 1902, a Royal Decree of July 11 established the "Royal Board for the Repression of White Slavery" (Spanish: Patronato Real para la Represión de la Trata de Blancas) within the Ministry of Justice, later reformed in 1904 and 1909. With the arrival of the Second Republic, it was reorganized in 1931 as the Board for the Protection of Women and was dissolved in 1935, transferring its powers to the Superior Council for the Protection of Minors. The Board was re-established after the Francoist victory in the Spanish Civil War on November 6, 1941, and wasn't finally dissolved until 1985, with its responsibilities for women's protection transferred to the autonomous communities.

Writer Consuelo García del Cid Guerra brought to light the history of abuses, tortures, baby theft (the lost children of Francoism), and human rights violations committed by the Board with her book Las desterradas hijas de Eva (2012). The author herself experienced these Francoist reformatories. In May 2023, she spoke at the Parliament of Catalonia about the Board, requesting a specific investigative commission and public apology from the religious congregations operating the institution's centers.

== Functions and operation ==
According to Article 4 of the Decree of November 6, 1941, the Board's purpose was the "moral dignification of women, especially young women, to prevent their exploitation, steer them away from vice, and educate them according to the teachings of the Catholic Church." However, this education was, in reality, minimal or non-existent. Instead, it played a pivotal role in the repression of women during Franco's regime in Spain. Contrary to its purported mission of protecting them, the Patronato was primarily tasked with strictly enforcing the repressive values of National Catholicism using coercive and brutal methods. Many girls and young women who were just considered wayward, disobedient, or promiscuous, as well as unmarried pregnant teenagers, were locked up without having actually committed any crime, even according to Francoist law.

Some of these girls were dropped off by parents who just no longer wanted to care for them. Others were put into state custody because they were denounced by family members. For instance, a Marian Torralbo was denounced by her brother—a member of Acción Católica—for partying. All were incarcerated without a trial. Women could not leave in many cases until they were 25 years old, their legal adult maturity age under Francoist law.

Girls put into these reformatories were first subject to virginity tests conducted by nuns. This was done on a daily basis, with girls forced to sit on a hospital bed where a doctor would ask them if they were a virgin. After they said yes, the doctor would imply they were liars and then put a stick up a girl's vagina to check without her consent. Many girls became "hysterical" during this process.

The Patronato enforced two types of moral control: a "hidden" one targeting individual "immoral" activities of women, such as prostitution or homosexuality, and an "ostensible" one surveilling public spaces for any sign of nonconformity. The year 1952 marked a significant increase in the number of young women interned, driven by legal reforms affecting young women's status and the Francoist state's response to cultural changes threatening traditional gender roles. Its expansion, with over 900 Catholic-run centers, reflected the regime's struggle against modernization and its insistence on traditional ideals. The institution's immense power is evident in the rising numbers of girls and women interned, reaching over 41,000 by 1965, or about 1.7% of all females aged 15–24.

The law was eventually changed in 1985, and no longer allowed minors to be forcibly placed under the control of the state "for their own protection," without having committed any crime or being actually endangered, under judicial oversight. Following this, all remaining reformatories were closed. The Patronato, along with the Court of Public Order (TOP), symbolized state mechanisms enforcing Francoist repression. Contemporary scholars and activists continue to push for recognition of these women's experiences—often overlooked in official narratives— advocating for their recognition as victims of Francoist persecution.

=== Missing documents ===
In 1996, over 1,500 boxes, out of a total of 1,564, containing key documentation about the Board and the whereabouts of babies born in its centers, were lost in a "flood" at the Ministry of Labor, where they were stored. The contents of these boxes had never been studied or inventoried.

== See also ==
- Gender violence and rape in Francoist Spain and the democratic transition
- Magdalene Laundries in Ireland
- Prostitution in Spain
- Sección Femenina
- White Terror (Spain)
- Women prisoners in Francoist Spain

== Bibliography ==
- Consuelo García del Cid Guerra (2012): Las desterradas hijas de Eva. Algon Ed. ISBN 978-84-938407-9-2
- Consuelo García del Cid Guerra (2015): Ruega por nosotras. Algon Ed. ISBN 978-84-944025-7-9
- Consuelo García del Cid Guerra (2021): Las insurrectas del Patronato de Protección a la Mujer. Anantes Ed. ISBN 978-84-122441-7-5
- Marta García and María Palau (2023): Indignas hijas de su Patria - Crónicas del Patronato de Protección a la Mujer en el País Valencià. Institució Alfons el Magnànim Ed. - Centre Valencià d'Estudis i d'Investigació. ISBN 978-84-1156-008-5.

=== Novelized ===
- Montse Alabarta Gomis and Lourdes Moraga (2023): Margaritas Blancas: Mujeres Invisibles. Letra Minúscula Ed. ISBN 978-84-197051-1-2
