= Political prisoners in Francoist Spain =

Political prisoners in Francoist Spain were interned in concentration camps, prisons and mental institutions. At the end of the Spanish Civil War, according to the Francoist State's figures, there were more than 270,000 men and women held in prisons, and some 500,000 had fled into exile. In the Second World War, large numbers of refugees from Spain were returned or interned in Nazi concentration camps as stateless enemies.

Releasing all political prisoners was a part of the transition to democracy after the death of the caudillo Francisco Franco in 1975. The freeing of political prisoners was part of the Spanish 1977 Amnesty Law, promulgated on 15 October 1977, and entered into force on 17 October of that same year.

In 2014, an Argentinian judge issued warrants for the arrest of Antonio González Pacheco, a Spanish policeman accused of torturing prisoners during Franco's military rule, but the Spanish High Court refused on the basis that the statute of limitations had run out on the accusation against him.

== Website ==
A website called the "Portal de Víctimas de la Guerra Civil y Represaliados del Franquismo" is maintained under the auspices of the Ministry of Education, Culture and Sport. As the name implies, it makes available information regarding victims of the Civil War and the Francoist State. As some of the victims were refugees, the portal not only draws on Spanish archival material, but also foreign sources, including information about Spanish people held in Nazi concentration camps.

== See also ==
- Marcos Ana - Spain's longest serving political prisoner (1939–1961)
