= Lost children of Francoism =

Children taken from Republican parents

The lost children of Francoism (Spanish: niños perdidos del franquismo, niños robados por el franquismo; Catalan: nens perduts del franquisme, nens furtats pel franquisme; Galician: nenos do franquismo, pícaros roubados polo Franquismo) were the children abducted from Republican parents, who were either in jail or had been assassinated by Nationalist troops, during the Spanish Civil War and Francoist Spain, and later from random citizens or girls confined in the notorious Women's Protection Board. The kidnapped children were sometimes also victims of child trafficking and forced adoption.

The numbers of stolen children are highly speculative because these children were often not registered upon birth, and even when they had been registered, archives were destroyed later; these figures may include children who became orphaned as a result of the Civil War (1936–1939) and, therefore, do not fall under the same category as children taken away from their parents by the regime after the war for political or social reasons.

== Hispanic eugenics ==
Hispanic eugenics was pioneered by doctors like Antonio Vallejo Nájera and Gregorio Marañón. Antes que te cases was published by Nájera in 1946, with one part saying, "Racial decadence is the result of many things but the most important is conjugal unhappiness in the most prosperous and happy of homes. ... Eugenic precepts may avoid morbid offspring. ... It is impossible a robust race without a sound preparation of youth for marriage, through Catholic Morality. This little work is a minuscule contribution to the exaltation of the Fatherland." Marañón's 1921 Maternidad y feminismo, republished as a second edition in 1951, said, "The difference between the sexes is insurmountable. Such difference emerges from the anatomical surface of each man and woman, and it goes to the deepest, darkest roots of life, to the home of the cells."

Eugenics in Spain in the late 1930s and through to the 1940s was not based on race, but instead on people's political alignment with the regime. Ricardo Campos said, "the racial question during the Franco era is complex." He went on to say, "despite the similarities of the Franco regime with the Italian and German fascism and the interest that the eugenics provoked, the strong Catholicism of the regime prevented its defense of the eugenic policies that were practiced in the Nazi Germany." Campos went on to say, "it was very difficult to racialize the Spanish population biologically because of the mixture that had been produced historically." Vallejo-Nágera in his 1937 work, "Eugenics of the Hispanicity and Regeneration of the Race" defined Hispanicness around spirituality and religion. The goal was the "strengthening psychologically" of the phenotype. Because Catholicism was opposed to negative eugenics, the only way to fight the degradation was through repression of abortion, euthanasia and contraception.

Women in Francoist Spain in the immediate post-war period were viewed as essential towards the rebuilding of the country, with their most important aspect being viewed as their bodies. Francoist Spain believed women should become mothers, reproducing to support the needs of the state. They were to give themselves over to this task in both body and soul. Dr. Luque was quoted in the SF magazine Y in 1938 as saying, "In the state, the woman/mother has to be the most important citizen. Those are the words that Hitler said in his fundamental program. Because we know he is totally right, and because we are aware of the importance of getting as many healthy children from healthy mothers as we can for our country at this moment, we have to make this statement come true, not only in words but in action."

== State indoctrination of orphaned children ==
As it has been reported by factions that opposed the Francoist government, alleged "kidnappings" could have been done to benefit couples who sided with the Francoist regime and wished to have children. Some claim that the "kidnapping" of children eventually became a state policy. It has been said that the Ministry of Justice adopted the responsibility of "collecting" the children whose parents had been assassinated, jailed, or had disappeared, with the goal of indoctrinating them with the new state model. By 1943, 12,043 Republican children were in state custody.

=== Prisons ===
Republican mothers and their children faced repression both inside and outside jail. There are numerous oral testimonies from women recounting many types of humiliation. The living conditions in jails were grievous: the massive number of arrests made prisoners live in extreme overcrowding. Food was scarce, and hygiene was poor. Many children who entered jail with their mothers died there. Those who survived were separated from their mothers and, in many cases, given up for illegal adoptions, as the law stated that children could not remain in jail with their mothers after the age of three years. Other children ended up in convents, forced to convert to Catholicism.

A law passed on 30 March 1940 meant Republican women could keep their children with them in prison until the child turned three years old. Children were then put into state care to prevent the 'contagion' of Republican thinking from spreading. The number of children removed from Republican mothers between 1944 and 1954 was 30,960. The children were not allowed to remain in contact with their families, and many found themselves in centers run by Auxilio Social. When mothers were released from prisons, they were often watched to make sure that they were 'good mothers' as defined by the state. Actively surveilled, many women lost custody of new children they had.

Caserón de la Goleta, the women's prison in Málaga, had horrible conditions for women prisoners. Women were packed into tiny, unhygienic cubicles where conditions were so bad that they facilitated the spread of disease. Food often consisted of fruit peels or edible waste. Many of the inmates were there as retaliation for relatives having disappeared or fled into exile. Guards and visiting church and regime officials would often sexually assault female prisoners. Pregnant women would be forced to give birth in unsanitary prison conditions, and infant mortality was a serious issue.

María Topete Fernández was part of prison leadership at the Prison for Nursing Mothers in Madrid. Held up as a model for being the first of its kind in Europe, the prison had problems with infant mortality. While the Law of Maternal and Infant Health in June 1941 reduced infant deaths by a small amount, imprisoned Republican women would not see improved rates until 1943, and significant improvement until 1952, when the prison's rationing system was abandoned.

The punishment of being a female relative of a "red" male was resurrected between 1945 and 1947, when there was a surge in guerrilla activity. This resulted in a large number of rural women swelling the populations of Spanish prisons, including in Madrid, Córdoba, Málaga and Segovia. They had received sentences of 20 to 30 years merely for feeding "red" male relatives. Age did not matter, as girls as young as nine were sent to prison, where they would be physically assaulted by guards.

Children of prisoners were taught in Catholic schools, as part of efforts to indoctrinate them in regime ideology, that their parents were in prison because they were traitors to the state.

=== Nuestra Señora de La Almudena ===
Single pregnant teenaged girls were particularly vulnerable in the Francoist period, with the state assuming guardianship of them and their children at the Peña Grande maternity prison, officially known as Nuestra Señora de La Almudena, until the girls turned 25 years old. Girls found themselves there as a result of being taken in by the police or relatives dropping them off at the facility. A special wing existed for some women who voluntarily checked in and had the money to afford to hide their pregnancies.

In some cases, the state would line the pregnant women in a row, bring in men who had paid a fee and allow them to choose among the woman for one to marry or work in his home; the women would never know beforehand the purpose. The men would sometimes also return the women they had selected, indicating they were not happy with their choice and then pick out a new woman. It was primarily from the Peña Grande maternity prison that children part of the 'stolen babies' scandal were taken, with women continuing to be imprisoned there until 1984. The conditions at the state-supported facility were so bad that girls would commit suicide by jumping off the top floor stairwell.

María Ángeles Martínez was one woman kept at the Peña Grande facility while she was pregnant. She said about her experience, "I entered as a 19-year-old, in August of 1975. I was an orphan and I had just gotten pregnant, so my sister-in-law, who wanted to get rid of me, told me 'get dressed we're going', and without knowing where she was going, she brought me here." She described the nuns: "They told me what I was going to do with a daughter, how I was going to feed her, if they had thrown me out of the house, if I was a wretch, and she was going to be one too." She described the process of giving birth, "I was in the dilatation room, and with half a head already out and they told me that I had to walk alone to the operating room and get on the gurney. I went with all the care, but she was born with a deformed skull. When they saw it, they stopped insisting I give her to them. I think that's why I did not lose my daughter."

=== Repatriation of children ===
During the war, many parents sent their children to foreign countries, including Britain, France and Russia, out of concern. Franco, after winning the war, declared that those children needed to return to Spain, with or without parental permission. The regime turned the repatriation of the minors into a large propaganda operation. A 1940 law stated that the legal authority of children in facilities belonging to the human rights' group Auxilio Social ("Social Aid") would automatically be transferred to the state. That created a risk that parents would forever lose their children if they sent them to foreign countries.

== Later years ==
Victims' groups have stated that the baby kidnappings developed into a business that continued into the 1980s. In January 2011, the families of 261 babies who disappeared in hospitals over a period of fifty years put forward their cases to the attorney general in Madrid. This began when two brothers were told by their foster father that he had bought them from a priest; the pair then went to the media and the story spread, encouraging others to come forward. Evidence consisted of the testimony of nurses and people who admitted illegally adopting babies, with hospital staff, nuns and priests suspected of being part of an organised network. People underwent DNA tests in the hope of reuniting their families but there were few matches. Many graves of dead infants were dug up for DNA-testing but some contained no remains while others contained those of an adult. Lawyers involved in some cases estimate the number of abducted children to be up to 300,000.

From 1941 to the early 1980s, the Women's Protection Board confined pregnant girls and young women deemed 'fallen or at risk of falling', even without having committed a crime, and stole their babies.

The Spanish Catholic Church had a controlling role in hospitals and social services because of Franco. The purpose of these abductions changed from ideological reasons to targeting parents, whom the network considered "morally- or economically-deficient" and in some cases, they charged money. Parents were mostly told that their children had died, and since the hospitals managed the burials, they never saw the bodies. In many cases the records went missing, either accidentally or because they were destroyed.

In one case, an 89-year-old woman confirmed that in 1969 a priest and a doctor encouraged her to fake a pregnancy so that she could receive a child due to be born at another clinic. Another involved undertakers in Málaga, who said that on some occasions they buried empty coffins supposedly containing children who had been born at a local hospital. Spanish law, under which the identity of an unmarried infant's mother could be recorded as 'unknown' to protect her anonymity is alleged to have facilitated these kidnappings. The 1977 Amnesty Law, passed two years after Franco's death, has never been repealed, rejected by the judiciary and opposed by politicians. This hindered the investigation of these traffickings as a national crime against humanity.

As late as 1996, a large number of documents regarding the Women's Protection Board and the whereabouts of babies born in its facilities went missing. These documents had never been studied or properly inventoried.

== Legal and moral reparations ==
Jurist Baltasar Garzón, who believed that the crimes committed constituted crimes against humanity, urged the attorney general and judges investigating the case to sanction those at fault and to pay reparations to victims in such a way that they could regain their lost identities.

Garzón included in his cited statistics, based on historical sources, that more than 30,000 Republican children had been under the "tutelage" of the Francoist regime between 1944 and 1954. He also specified that these children were kidnapped or forcefully repatriated by the Falange, and that children's names were changed so that they could be given to families in favor of the Francoist regime. They never returned to their original families, and Garzón considers these children part of the Francoist victims.

In 2006, the Council of Europe was the first international organization to recognize Republican children whose last names had been changed.

== Forensic investigation ==
A 2026 study by researchers of the National Institute of Toxicology and Forensic Sciences, published in Forensic Science International: Genetics, rejects the number of 300,000 cases. They do not deny the coerced adoptions by the Women's Protection board or the 30,000 children placed in state care after their parents died, were imprisoned, exiled, in hiding or disappeared. The researchers reject the hypothesis of systemic theft of babies or that babies were declared dead and then abducted.

== Works ==
=== Filmography ===
- Els nens perduts del franquisme (The lost children of Francoism), by Montserrat Armengou and Ricard Belis – 2002 documentary on the kidnappings during the war
- Franco's Legacy—Spain's Stolen Children - 2017.

=== Books ===
This topic is addressed in the novel Fountains of Silence by Ruta Sepetys, in which the author goes into detail.

=== Periodicals ===
The article "Taken Under Fascism, Spain's 'Stolen Babies' Are Learning the Truth" by Nicholas Casey in The New York Times covers the specific story of Ana Belén Pintado and the role of the Catholic Church in these abductions.

== See also ==
- Gender violence and rape in Francoist Spain and the democratic transition
- Women's Protection Board
- White Terror (Spain)
- Grandmothers of the Plaza de Mayo
- Stolen Generation

== Works cited ==
- Armengou, Montse; Belis, Ricard (2004). Las fosas del silencio [The graves of silence] (in Spanish) (Plaza y Janés ed.).
- Rodríguez Arias, Miguel Ángel (2008). El caso de los niños perdidos del franquismo: crimen contra la humanidad [The case of the lost children of Francoism: crimes against humanity] (in Spanish). Valencia: Tirant lo Blanch. ISBN 978-8498763034.
