= Women in 1940s Spain =

Period in the history of women in Spain

Women in 1940s Spain were mainly recognised as mothers and homemakers.

== The 1940s ==
The 1940s and 1950s were a dark period in Spanish history, where the country was still recovering from the effects of the Spanish Civil War. The economy was poor and people suffered a huge number of deprivations as a result of the loss of life and the repressive nature of the regime which sought to vanquish any and all remaining Republican support by going after anyone who had been affiliated with or expressed any sympathies towards the Second Republic.

The end of World War II meant Franco felt threatened by the extinction of other European fascist regimes on the continent. To ensure his and the regime's continued existence, he took more further steps to purge visible to outsider European fascist elements. This resulted in increased lack of coherence for the regime's fascist based ideology. Steps included referring to the government as "autoritarismo" or "régimen conservador de desarrollo", merging fascist organizations like Falange with more traditional, Catholic organizations to repress Falange's more overt fascist elements, and by not trying to portray the regime as aggressive towards other nations.

During the Franco period, families of dead and disappeared Republicans were prohibited from mourning publicly. They could not retrieve bodies. They could not give them headstones. They could not wear mourning garb. They could not cry about the loss of their loved ones in public. Displays of grief were only allowed in the private domain, and often centered around photographs the family had of their dead and missing. Photos became a source of comfort, dignity and resistance. They were passed down from generation so families would not forget their histories.

Women were generally not part of the founding of guerrilla groups operating in the 1940s. They were brought in later, as part of a disaffected class, through personal and political contacts. Almost all women involved with guerrilla groups were from rural areas and had family involved. This differed from the previous period, where many fighters came from the middle class and urban areas. One group women belonged to was Agrupación guerrillera de Levante y Aragón (AGLA).

In the 1940s, women were barred from a number of professions. These included being a magistrate, diplomat, notary, customs officer, stock broker, and prison doctor. This was because women were expected to be homemakers.

From the 1940s to the 1980s, women were able to be reported to the authorities for violating female morality. These women could then be imprisoned in reformatories without a trial. Women were incarcerated for a variety of reasons including: being a comparsa, not obeying her mother, going out too often, and reluctance to work.

In Barcelona during the 1940s, women had to be accompanied by a male relative if they wanted to be out on the street at night; they could not go out unaccompanied. Internal Spanish female migrants found life in Spain difficult during the 1940s, 1950s and 1960s as Francoist policy dictated they remain in the home. Unlike their husbands who could new develop social connections through outside employment, immigrant women were isolated having left behind their social networks in their home countries.

During the 1940s, the number of women in Málaga sentenced to Caserón de la Goleta for food acquisition related crimes increased. The city itself had a severe food shortage and typhus was common. Some women would willingly get sent to prison in order to be able to suck on leftover orange peels because that was considered to be more plentiful than what was available on the streets. The prison was rife with typhus and other diseases whose spread throughout the prison was aided by the cramped conditions where women were put six to a room designed for two.

During the 1940s and 1950s, Francoism said prisoners could be redeemed by the Church. Consequently, promulgating the faith was often made a condition of release. In order for prisoners with children to receive subsidies, they needed to be married. As a result, many women got married behind bars and had their children baptized as Roman Catholics.

The most popular novels written by women in the 1940s and 1950s were romance novels (Spanish: novelas rosas), outselling all other types of women's writings. These were not serious literary works, but were intended for mass consumption. This period was male-dominated and literary establishments refused to take women's literary efforts seriously. Consequently, there was very little serious criticism of women's writings. When their works were criticized, they were often compared only to works of other women. Some criticism in literary publications would comment on a female writers appearance, while taking very little note of her actual writings. When socially acclaimed women writers like Carmen Nonell were recognized, they were recognized in ways that sought to erase their gender.

== Women's rights and feminism ==
One of the issues for feminists in the 1930s and 1940s was that they never were able to successfully challenge the regime's definition of womanhood as motherhood. Those who did were not viewed as representative of the movements they came from. This included feminists in the pre-Civil War period such as Hildegart Rodriguez and Lucia Sánchez Saornil. It was more common for feminists to embrace the concept of motherhood, with Federica Montseny as an example.

Women in the Cortes Españolas provided negligible contributions to the body during the 1940s and 1950s, these women would be more influential during the 1960s and 1970s as Spain's economy changed and broader Spanish culture demanded contradictory and complex things from women as the regime tried to keep the changing culture in line with its fascist ideology.

Most women in the 1940s were not politically active, involved with guerrilla groups or militants. They were women dealing with hardship, poverty and the imposition of gender norms that imposed on their everyday lives. Their process of coping and surviving often made their personal activities intersect with activism as they subtly challenged the limits imposed by the regime.

The 1940s saw the emergence of the chicas topolino. Named after an Italian car, women in this movement wore wedge shoes with cork soles, skirts worn a little longer than the knee, nylon stockings and tight dresses. They went to dances and smoked. They wanted to go to the Chicote and smoke American cigarettes. They tried to imitate famous actresses of this period such as Amparo Rivelles, Concha Monte, Irene Dunne or Myrna Loy. They were most prominent on the Catalan coast, where they were scandalized for wearing bikinis. In this period, these chicas Topolino are considered to be the Spanish feminists of 1940s Spain.

A group of female novelists had started writing in the 1940s. During the 1960s, their work began to emerge and describe feminist life in post-Civil War Spain.

=== Abortion and contraception ===
Birth rate and women's marriage age
Year	Birth rate per thousand women	Percentages of marriages where women were under the age of 20	ref
1938	16	12	
1940	26	12.5	
1941	20	13	
1943	22	12	

Eugenics in Spain in the late 1930s and through to the 1940s was not based on race, but instead on people's political alignment with the regime. Ricardo Campos said, "the racial question during the Franco era is complex." He went on to say, "despite the similarities of the Franco regime with the Italian and German fascism and the interest that the eugenics provoked, the strong Catholicism of the regime prevented its defense of the eugenic policies that were practiced in the Nazi Germany." Campos went on to say, "it was very difficult to racialize the Spanish population biologically because of the mixture that had been produced historically." Vallejo-Nágera in his 1937 work, "Eugenics of the Hispanicity and Regeneration of the Race" defined Hispanicness around spirituality and religion. The goal was the"strengthening psychologically" of the phenotype. Because Catholicism was opposed to negative eugenics, the only way to impose eugenic policies was through repression of abortion, euthanasia and contraception. Doctors in Francoist Spain had two roles: to be moral protectors of Spanish reproduction and to provide science based medical services. This put male doctors in charge of women's birth control. When medical doctors in the Second Republic and early Francoist period defended birth control, it was on the eugenics grounds that it protected the health of both women and children as it curbed the spread of genetic disease and tuberculosis and sexually transmitted diseases.

Women could and did go to prison for having abortions. During the 1940s in Almería, 9% of female prisoners were there because they had abortions, had committed infanticide or abandoned their children. This compared to 20.45% who were in prison for sexual offenses that mostly included prostitution, and 4.9% who were in prison for crimes against authority. The remaining prisoners were there for other offenses, like coercion, crimes against religion, weapons possession or having a false identity.

Abortion was not allowed to be discussed in society, with women intentionally kept ignorant. Abortion, along with other facets of women's sexuality, was only allowed to be discussed in a medical setting by male doctors. Abortion was not allowed to be discussed in newspapers. The few newspapers that did mention abortions, used euphemisms. One example was in an article by Pedro Galán Bergua in Heraldo de Aragón dated 1 January 1942: "The evil is not in those who marry, but in the married who are satisfied with the reduced offspring and go to methods condemned by God and for the country."

State-controlled and state-supported religious, medical, and legislative newspapers from the 1940s give an impression that all women accepted the imposition of the state around the topic of abortion and its relation to the need for the maintenance of the population size. Despite this, one estimate in 1943 by Matemólogo de la Sanidad Nacional Angel Clavero Núñez estimated one abortion for every three live births; they estimated that 125,000 abortions were performed every year. Abortions were generally only recorded when a woman had a resulting health complication.

Between 1940 and 1950, there were 44 abortions reported in the province of Zaragoza. 29 of these involved single women or widows. Judicial documents indicate single women and widows had abortions to avoid the disgrace of having a child outside of marriage.

Prostitution was quite common in Zaragoza in the 1940s and was tolerated by the local government. Despite this, prostitutes were often charged with the respective crimes of corruption of minors and having abortions, most of whom were minors themselves. Prostitutes were also the group most likely being charged with engaging in birth control methods. Married women who had abortions tended to do so as a form of birth control, to limit the number of children that were in their family. Women in Zaragoza who were found guilty of having abortions tapped into a network to get assistance, with 38 of 44 cases involving help from other women including mothers, sisters, neighbors and friends. These women provided information, contacted the midwife or acted as a support to the woman seeking the abortion. The abortions were performed using things like knitting needles, parsley stems, vaginal irritants, physical trauma, probes, mustard baths, or ingesting substances. Most of these methods were passed on to women via an oral tradition. Where municipality was known, 21 came from the city of Zaragoza while 15 came from more rural areas. This was despite regime efforts to make the rural areas appear like they were more ideologically aligned with it. 10 women in Luna were found guilty of having abortions, in an extreme case of what appeared to be a coordinated effort to hide the existence of an underage prostitution ring. Most of the girls were unable to sign their own names when brought in by the Guardia Civil.

Because midwives appeared to be so frequently involved in sharing knowledge about abortion and contraceptives and performing abortions, the male led scientific community in Spain tried to marginalize these women. Professionalization in medicine and growing interests in furthering the idea of male doctors aided in lessening the importance of midwives in Spain. Further attempts to dislodge midwives from the birthing process included accusing them of witchcraft and quackery, trying to make them appear unscientific. This was all part of a medical and eugenic science driven effort to reduce the number of abortions in Spain.

For women who had abortions in the 1940s, they did not appear to do so out of any conscious effort to subvert the regime's ideological position around the role of women; rather, these women were trying to protect themselves, their families and their economic well-being by taking the only step available to them in the face of an unwanted pregnancy.

Most couples practicing family planning used coitus interruptus during the 1940s and 1950s. The Catholic Church in this period allowed couples to use the rhythm method. As American culture began to influence Spain more during the mid-1950s, Spaniards began to adopt more American birth control methods.

=== Childcare ===
One of the most important female labor activities in the Francoist period, especially between 1940 and 1970, was childcare. The regime used Sección Femenina and Acción Católica to impose its pro-natalist policies on Spain through the concept of traditional womanhood, that demanded among other things that women tend to the home and be primary caregivers to their children. This was expected of women, even if they were required to take on extra work inside the home or they were able to pay someone to do basic domestic tasks. Men were expected to be in the workforce, providing a steady income that would cover the costs of running the household. In this period, there was no differentiation between paid and domestic work for women. Both were viewed as part of the same purpose of women serving Spanish society.

=== Divorce ===
During the Franco period, there was the concept of "hidden divorce". These were declarations by the Spanish Catholic Church that a marriage was nullified. They were different from ecclesiastical courts dissolution of marriages. These annulments were only allowed because of Pauline privilege, where the church may grant a nullification for a marriage where neither spouse has been baptized. This method of nullification may only be granted when one spouse wishes to convert to Catholicism and the other does not. This allows the converted Catholic spouse to be able to remarry a practicing Catholic.

Another way a marriage could end under Catholic law was known as Petrine privilege. A divorce could be granted if the married coupled included a Catholic and non-Catholic spouse, where the Catholic spouse wanted the separation so they could remarry to a Catholic.

=== Education ===
The Women's Section of the Falange (Sección Femenina) offered classes for women. Their focus was on discrediting feminist discourse from the Second Republic and supporting the state in defining the role of women as wives and mothers. Out of the realization that not all women would marry, Sección Feminina also offered women classes designed to prepare them to immigrate to a new country.

In Jaén, almost all of the vocational educational opportunities for women were organized by Sección Feminina. Courses were in embroidery, cooking, domestic economy, childcare, and manual jobs. Advertisements for these courses said they were about "equipping future housewives with minimal knowledge to be tomorrow good wives, good mothers and ultimately good Spaniards."

During the 1940s, there was a paper shortage, which resulted in a major drop in the number of available printed publications. This impacted literacy rates.

Literacy rate percentages in Spain from 1800 to 2010 (Note: The methods of counting vary and are not consistent. When multiple sources are used, a range is used instead of an exact number to account for the difference.)
Year	Women's literacy rate	Men's	Total population	ref
1935	67			
1940	71.6	76.9	76.83 - 82.8	
1950	81.7		82.66	

The Elementary Education Act of 1945 was created specifically for the purpose of furthering gender roles by indoctrinating children in these roles at a young age. Girls were taught at this age that their role was to become perfect housewives, that one of their most important roles was to always remain faithful to their husbands, and that they should always delegate to and defer to men. Girls were taught that they were to be housewives. Any other career option would be dishonorable to her family.

Primary school attendance totals and percentages
Year	All students	Population aged 5 – 14 years	Percentage enrolled	ref
1930	2598000	4876000	53.3	
1940	3012000	5501000	54.7	
1950	2791000	4762000	58.6	

While musical education for boys was largely just learning of patriotic songs in the 1940s, girls in secondary education had music theory classes, learned popular songs and received extensive musical education. Patriotic songs were sometimes neglected but were given the same general importance. Textbooks of this period wrote women out of history, except where they reinforced women's roles as mothers.

Enrollment percentages in secondary education
Year	% girls	% boys	ref
1939–1940	36	66	
1940–1941	35.9	64.1	
1944–1945	35	65	
1950–1951	35.2	64.8	

During the Franco period, there were two jobs open to women that necessitated a university education. They were nursing, teaching and childcare. Women were barred from legal and diplomatic careers by law, so there were no university programs open to women in this period. The most popular degrees were in Pharmacy, Philosophy and Letters, Education Sciences, Philology, Geography, and History. The least popular subjects for girls in this period were Chemistry, Law, Medicine, and Veterinary Science.

Women's enrollment nation at Spanish universities
Year	Total women enrolled	Percentage of all students university who were women	ref
1936	2588	8.8	
1940		13.2	
1950		13.9 - 14.5	

=== Employment ===
Numerous obstacles were placed on the work of women, especially married women, and restrictions were placed on their registration in the placement registers and her husband's authorization was required in order to be employed. Numerous labor ordinances stipulated that the woman as soon as she got married had to leave her job, being compensated with a dowry. The access of women to a large part of the bodies of the public administration, such as lawyer of the State, judge, prosecutor, diplomat, property registrar, notary, labor inspector, exchange agent, was prevented by law. Women were also prohibited from taking any jobs related to the military as it was thought that they needed to be protected from war. However, these measures could not prevent women from working because families often could not survive on one salary. Despite this, they were paid much less than men. Women also participated in labor disputes that, according to a provincial delegate of the OSE, "for reasons of their sex and special way of reacting, it is very difficult to convince with reasons, or to discuss them with arguments".

In the 1940s, women were barred from a number of professions. This was because a women's primary job was thought to be a homemaker. Women were prevented from getting jobs in the public sector. This included jobs at the Ministry of Justice, being lawyers or judges. Teachers were purged from the classroom on a regular basis for a variety of reasons. In Valencia, these included providing sex education and providing information about contraceptives. Women who worked would receive a salary 70% less than that of men working the exact same job.

In the 1940s, women comprised only 15% of workers in the industrial section and 23% in the service sector, which included domestic servants. A lack of jobs in the 1940s also led to widespread resentment against women, as some men believed that women were stealing their jobs and were interfering with their right to work. This often meant women were vulnerable to being paid less or accepting casual jobs.

Women who did work were doubly burdened, as they were expected to main the home, take care of the children all the while doing their job outside the home. Married women with young children often had to spend most of their time at working full-time jobs where she was expected to work 40 to 48 hours a week. Successful married women in the workforce in the 1940s, 1950s and 1960s were often blind to their own privilege, and they were often unsympathetic to other women with similar burdens. Women working outside the home in the 1940s were often demeaned and devalued by others in society, who were unsympathetic to their economic situation and tried to impose their beliefs that these women should be at home.

One of the differences between nursing as an occupation in Spain and in Anglo-Saxon culture was Anglo-Saxon women's nursing had deep roots in the feminist movement. In Spain, nursing was viewed as a lower rung in the broader Spanish medical hierarchy. Even in the face of international programs like the Red Cross and visiting medical professionals from abroad, Spanish medicine resisted making its hierarchy and teaching practices less sexist. Men and women received different training for the same roles, be it being a midwife, nurse or medical practitioner. Training for women was focused on deference to male colleagues and on her supposed inferior intellect. In Francoist Spain, female nurses were treated as carers, while male nurses were treated as healers. This was a result of gender biases in teaching, and in gender biases around the concept of the scientific knowledge possessed by each gender and how it is expressed in a medical context. Caring was more centered around the home, while healing was done outside the home; this system comported with Spanish gender roles.

=== Guardianship ===
An intake file of a teenager named Ana María in 1948 in Seville who had been placed into government care for her own protection.

Up until the mid-1960s, Franco's legal system gave husbands near total control over their wives. This would not change until women started playing a more central role in the Spanish economy.

In Barcelona during the 1940s, women had to be accompanied by male relatives if they wanted to be out on the street at night; they could not go out unaccompanied. This was as a result of a national policy that imposed curfews on women.

Daughters had limited options to leave their father's households in the 1940s. They could leave through marriage which would subsequently put them under their husband's household. They could also leave if one of their parents died and then remarried. Even then, girls still needed permission from a judge, and a place to live in the house of another relative.

Teenage girls could become wards of the state through Patronato de Proteccion a la Mujer. Starting in 1941 and lasting until 1985, girls were taken to centers called reformatories run by nuns as part of a state goal to rehabilitate the "fallen". Some of these girls were dropped off by parents who no longer wanted to care for them, such was the case of Raquel Castillo. Some girls were put into state custody because they were denounced by family members. Marian Torralbo was denounced by her brother, a member of Acción Católica, for partying. All were incarcerated without a trial. In most cases, these girls could not leave until they were 25-years-old, when they became of age and were considered legal adult women. Girls put into these reformatories were subject to virginity tests conducted by nuns. This was done on a daily basis, with girls forced to sit on a hospital bed where a doctor would ask them if they were a virgin and conduct a pelvic exam, often without their consent. Many girls would become traumatised from this procedure. The law changed in 1985 around girls taken into state custody, and no longer allowed minors to be placed under the control of the state for their own protection. Following this, all remaining reformatories were closed.

For many married women in this period, sexual abuse was the norm in marriage. A woman from Cordoba named Theodora described her experiences with her husband in this period as, "I did not want, I did not want to [have sex]. Because if he came (...) Because he has always came late (...) Frozen from drinking and smoking, to me what I would like, if I came to a tart wine and I did not feel like it. But he, whether I wanted to or not, would take me and put me face up and go up and I gave him a speech and he did not care about me, that I had no pleasure." Some women would pretend to be menstruating to avoid having sex with their husbands.

=== Suffrage ===
Between 1939 and 1976, the opportunities to vote on the national level were nearly non-existent in Spain. There were three national referendums, and two elections for attorneys to represent families in the courts. There were also eight municipal elections. Because of controls by the dictatorship, elected municipal and legislative officials were limited in changes they could enact.

Women nominally maintained the right to vote, one of the view rights that carried over from the Second Republic to the Francoist period. Universal suffrage existed in Spain during the dictatorship, but the only time people could vote was during referendums and for municipal officials. While direct voting was allowed, repression of women still existed as only the head of household could vote. This largely excluded women, as only widowed women were generally considered heads of household. Most public efforts around franchising of women in this period were based on regime attempts to be perceived abroad as more democratic, and did not necessarily lead to greater numbers of eligible voters or meaningful and free elections that could result in undermining the regime.

== By year ==
=== 1940 ===
Franco issued an order in May 1940 that said, "Any person who wishes to exhume the corpse of one of his relatives who were killed by the red horde, to inter them again in the cemetery, you can request it to the civil governor of the corresponding province." The government provided this service at no cost. The regime did not offer anything comparable for families of victims of Nationalist aggression.

During the Civil War, from his seat of government in Burgos, Franco issued a declaration in April 1938 that promised pensions to widows and orphans of Nationalist forces captured by Republicans. His regime extended these benefits in December 1940 to widows and orphans of all nationalist troops and Nationalist supporters killed by Republicans. This was further extended in July 1941 to any Nationalist civil servants killed during the war. In December 1931, these pensions were extended to the parents of priests killed during the war.

Adoración Campo Cañedo was the first woman from this region to head for the bush, joining guerrillas in 1940. She was followed by Alida González, sisters Antonia y Consuelo Rodríguez Montes, Alberta Viñales Martínez, Alpidia Moral Alonso and Asunción Macías Fernández. Alpidia Moral Alonso and Asunción Macías Fernández both died in the bush as a result of their combat activities.

The literacy rate for women was 67% in 1935. The rate had increased to 77% in 1940.

A law passed on 30 March 1940 meant Republican women could keep their children with them in prison until the child turned three years old. At this point, children were then put into state care to prevent Republican thinking from spreading.

In November 1940, the Ministry of the Interior published a decree on war orphans, namely children of parents shot or disappeared (exiles, forgotten in prisons, fugitives and clandestine), according to which only "irreproachable persons from the point of view of religious, ethical and national view" could obtain the guardianship of those children.

=== 1941 ===
1941 saw legislation that banned sex education, with punishments attached for teaching it.

All legislation passed in Spain between 1936 and 1941 that was not decreed by Franco was repealed in 1941. 1941 saw legislation that formally made abortion and conception usage illegal with attached punishments. Sex education was also banned, with punishments attached for teaching it. The Penal Code of 1870 was reintroduced in 1944, making adult and crimes of passion illegal and punishable by the state.

In December 1941, a law allowed children who did not remember their name, have been repatriated or whose parents could not be located were registered in the Civil Registry under a new name, which facilitated that they could be adopted irregularly. This practice extended to the entire period of the Franco dictatorship.

A law enacted by Franco in December 1941 stated that pregnant women given death sentences would have their executions delayed until they gave birth. At that point, the baby would be given to the father if he was alive and in Spain. Otherwise, many of these women had their newborns taken from them. The babies' surnames were changed, and they were given to loyal Nationalist families. This law helped to formalize the stolen babies process, a process that would not end until the middle of the democratic transition. Estimates by activists put the number of stolen babies at around 30,960 boys and girls.

On 10 March 1941, a Ministerial Order was made that allowed couples to have civil marriages. This was a new interpretation of EDL 1889/1. It was an amendment of Article 42 of the Civil Code. Civil marriages could take place though if both partners could provide a justification for not being Catholic and not wishing to have a Catholic marriage. Consequently, few civil marriages took place, aided by the fact that such marriages were considered by the government and society to be a rejection of the Spanish state.

On 24 January 1941, abortion was formally made a crime against the state by Franco. Doctors who performed abortions could be given sentences of between 6 years and 1 day to 14 years and 8 months in prison, along with fines between 2,500 and 50,000 pesetas. Doctors would lose any professional qualifications they had for a period of 10 to 20 years. Pharmacists or anyone in their employ who gave any substance or medicine that would be considered abortive could face the loss of their professional qualifications for 5 to 10 years and fines of between 1,000 and 25,000 pesetas. Any doctor, midwife or other medical practitioner who observed an abortion was required by law to report it to the authorities. Failure to do so would result in a fine. At the same time, any sale of materials used for the purpose of contraception or promoting their usage could be imprisoned for between 1 month and 1 day to 2 months. Sex education was also banned, with punishments attached for teaching it.

María Topete Fernández was part of prison leadership at the Prison for Nursing Mothers in Madrid. Held up as a model for being the first of its kind in Europe, the prison had problems with infant mortality. While the Law of Maternal and Infant Health in June 1941 reduced infant deaths by a small fraction, imprisoned Republican women would not see improved rates until 1943, and significant improvement until 1952 when the prison's rationing system was abandoned.

Prostitutes were held at facilities run by nuns through Patronato de Proteccion a la Mujer from 1941 to 1985. They would be put into cells next to girls abandoned by their families, spending only a few nights. According to Carlos Álvarez, researcher at the University of the Basque Country, "Their confinement fulfilled two objectives: on the one hand to separate them from the rest of society so that they did not influence it, and on the other hand to be 'rehabilitated', along the path of redemption."

=== 1942 ===
Franco created an appointed Cortes Españolas in 1942. The Cortes Españolas acted as a pseudo-representational body. Selection for the body was done indirectly, through other political organs of the state, including state sanctioned unions, city councils and state run businesses. The inaugural sitting included two women, Pilar Primo de Rivera and Mercedes Sainz Ortiz de Urbina. Thirteen total women would go on to serve in ten different sessions. Franco appointed four of them. The 1942 Referendum Act said in Article 2, "The referendum will be held among all the men and women of the Nation over twenty-one years [...]"

The Labor Regulation Act of 1942 stated women had to sign a voluntary dismissal form within a month of being married that resulted in them losing their job. After that, these newly married women had to wait two years before they could re-enter the workforce and only then, if they had permission from their husband.

In 1942, the average seamstress made 6.74 pesetas a day. The average female agricultural worker made 7.08 pesetas a day. This, coupled with lacking an employed male partner, made it very difficult for them to hire midwives who might assist them in an abortion as they were paid between 40 and 525 pesetas to attend births and abortions.

Working pregnant women had some government support when it came to childcare as a result of the 1942 Ley de Sanidad Infantil y Maternal. They were given six weeks of "paid rest" after the birth of their child, a cash prize from the government if they made the choice to breastfeed their child, and a year of childcare services. Despite this, women working outside the home was considered detrimental to the health of their children, with a mortality rate of 63 per 1000 births for housewives versus 74 for women who worked in the home, and 162 for women who worked outside the home. Women who did breastfeed their babies and who worked outside the home were strongly condemned. The only general exception was widows.

In the first days of the Francoist period, it was a crime for a woman to be mother, daughter, sister or wife of a "red", and this could be punished with long prison sentences or death. The Law of Political Responsibilities, reformed in 1942 and in force until 1966, was promulgated in order to give a legal cover to the repression carried out during the dismantlement of the Spanish republican institutions, as well as to penalize those who had remained loyal to the legally established government at the time of the July 1936 military rebellion against the Spanish Republic.

Matilde Landa was a prisoner at the Can Salas jail in Palma de Majorca. While at the prison from the time of her arrest during the Civil War to 1942, she was subjected to constant psychological torture at the hands of the Little Sisters of the Poor who attempted to convert her to Catholicism and punish her for her Republican ties. On 26 September 1942, after years of abuse in Can Salas, she committed suicide to escape the daily psychological torture.

In 1942, Spanish Republican groups in exile met in Mexico, forming the Unión Democrática Española (UDE). Participants included PSOE, UGT, Izquierda Republicana (IR), Unión Republicana (UR), Partido Republicano Federal (PRF), Unió de Rabassaires and Aliança Nacional de Catalunya (ANC). Partido Comunista Española (PCE) was excluded as communists were out of favor following the end of the Spanish Civil War. The goal of the meeting was to establish an alternative Juan Negrín led government abroad in opposition to Franco. PCE had similar goals but by December 1942, their writings excluded all possibility of joining with other Republican forces.

Foreign Affairs magazine in October 1942 said of Francoist commanders, "They never denied that they had promised white women to the Moors when they entered Madrid. Sitting with the officers on a camp bivouac, I overheard them discussing the collusion of that promise; only some argued that a woman was still Spanish despite her "red" ideas. This practice was not denied either by El Mizzian, the only Moroccan officer of the Spanish army. I was with this soldier at the road junction of Navalcarnero when two Spanish girls, who seemed not to have turned twenty yet, were brought before him. One of them had worked in a textile factory in Barcelona and a union card was found on her jacket; the other, from Valencia, claimed not to have political convictions. After questioning them to get some information of a military nature, El Mizzian took them to a small building that had been the village school, where about forty Moors rested. When they reached the door, there was a howling scream from the throats of the soldiers. I attended the scene horrified and uselessly indignant. El Mizzian smiled affectionately when I protested what happened saying, "Oh, they will not live more than four hours.""

The Law of 6 November 1942 changed the criminal code around both rape and adultery. Women between the ages of 16 and 23 who were deceived into having sex could file a complaint against a man, which could see him going to prison for up to six months. If a woman was deceived into having sex with a man and abuse was also involved, then he could receive 12 to 16 years in prison. Employers who abused women in their employ into having sex with them could also be imprisoned, though this sentence could be commuted if he married her. Financial penalties for committing rape were also increased.

=== 1943 ===
The 1943 Ley de Ordenación Universitaria saw major reforms by the regime to university education in that knowledge acquisition was made secondary to the promotion of patriotic values, with knowledge being shared needing to comport with these values and align with state promoted Catholic dogma. The law had thirteen chapters and 101 articles and provisions. Most importantly, this legislation made the Catholic Church the final arbitrator of all knowledge. Universities, under this law, became the cornerstone of developing a new, elite Spanish leadership. They also became transmitters of Spanish identity. Foreign and secular teachings were banned; education's purpose was to support the fatherland. Private universities were no longer to function autonomously, with the Federation of Catholic School Students being taken over by the Spanish University Syndicate. The 1943 lay required that all women at university complete six months of social service in state institutions under the guidance Sección Femenina's S.E.U supervision. This service was about reminding women of their role in the state.

Pilar Primo de Rivera attended the 1943 National Council of Spanish Education Service as the leader of the Women's Section. While an influential leader at the first edition of the National Council, she took pains to make sure her rhetoric was that which indicated a subordinate role because she was a woman. She said of women's education at the conference, "In regard to the role of women in the Party, we should unilaterally consider the condition of woman, and as a secondary thing her profession, work, et cetera, because even if she is a good worker, a good student, or a good teacher, principally, she is a woman, with a determined goal to accomplish, that, sometimes, accidentally, brings her to the University and to the workplace." She continued, arguing that women had never offered anything as they lacked intelligence and creativity, that they never discovered anything, and that they needed guidance from men to interpret information.

A 1943 law changed the age of majority for single women to 21. Despite turning 21, women could not move out at that age unless their fathers gave permission; they would have to wait until they turned 25 years old in order to move out on their own. The only exception was if the woman married, or entered a convent. The Labor Contracts Act of 1944 meant women needed permission of husbands before they were able to sign an employment contract.

Women's suffrage also changed because of rules around the age of majority and the voting age. The age of majority for women became 23 as a result of the imposition of the reintroduction of the Civil Code of 1889, article 321. This would change in 1943, when the age of majority was lowered to 21 so as to be consistent for both genders. An additional clause stipulated women did not reach a majority until they were 25 unless they were married or joined a convent remained. No elections or referendums took place in the period between 1939 and 1944; despite legal changes in the age of majority, women continued to be disenfranchised as the dictatorship did not hold elections.

=== 1944 ===
A 1944 edition of Semanario de la SF said, "The life of every woman, despite what she may pretend, is nothing but a continuous desire to find somebody to whom she can succumb. Voluntary dependency, the offering of every minute, every desire and illusion is the most beautiful thing, because it implies the cleaning away of all the bad germs -- vanity, selfishness, frivolity -- by love."

Municipal elections entailed three categories. These included union elections, corporate and entities, and family representatives. The first municipal union elections took place in 1944. The union elections of 1944 were broadly boycotted by many union works who were skeptical of the regime's actions. These elections were controlled by Franco through the right-wing Falange. UGT and CNT continued to boycott union elections into the 1950s and 1960s, as they saw them as legitimizing the regime.

The criminal code was modified in the Código Penal de 1944, with an addition of criminal punishment for third parties giving a woman an abortion without her consent or unintentionally causing an abortion when being violent towards a pregnant woman. Both offenses resulted in minor prison time.

The Penal Code of 1870 was reintroduced in 1944, making adultery and crimes of passion illegal and punishable by the state. Women could be sent to prison for committing adultery. They could be punished with six months to two years in prison if their husbands went to the courts and accused them of adultery. In some cases, they could receive sentences of up to six years and lose custody of their children. Husbands could withdraw the charge at any time, with women ending up with an ipso facto sentence. Women could not report their husbands to the authorities for committing acts of infidelity. Men were only considered to have committed adultery when they brought the affair partner into the marital home to live or if knowledge of a man's affair caused a public scandal. The regime's adultery laws were based on the Siete Partidas, established by Alfonso X, and designed to punish women for having sex outside of marriage. Article 449 of the Penal Code said, "Adultery will be punished with the penalty of minor prison time. The married woman who lies with a man who is not her husband commits adultery, and the one who lies with her, knowing that she is married, even if the marriage is declared null and void. " It continued, saying, "No penalty shall be imposed for the crime of adultery except by virtue of the grievance of the aggrieved husband". And it was still completed with one more article, "The husband may at any time remit the sentence imposed on his consort." What constituted adultery under the law was not always consistent, and standards for evidence against men accused of adultery were higher than women accused of adultery.

The 1944 Penal Code allowed for blood revenge, but only in cases where a husband caught his wife in the sexual act of committing adultery, not when a wife caught her husband. The law also said parents could kill their daughters if the daughter was 22 years old or younger, and they caught her having sex with a man. This was found in Article 438. Protests had taken place in the 1920s by women opposed to earlier versions of the law. Husbands and parents were still punished under the law for these killings, but the consequences were small and mostly included only an exile from his home of a distance greater than 25 kilometers of a few years. There was no punishment if the husband only gave serious injuries to his wife. The code said, "The husband who, if his wife is caught in adultery, will kill the woman or the adulterer on the spot or cause them one of the serious injuries, will be punished with banishment. If it causes them second-class injuries, they will be free of punishment. These rules are applicable to parents in the same circumstances, with respect to their daughters under twenty-three years of age and their corruptors, as long as they lived in their father's house."

The Labor Contracts Act of 1944 meant women needed permission of husbands before they were able to sign an employment contract. This act also had a clause that said to work in industrial or commercial sector jobs, women needed to have proof they had been vaccinated and a doctor's note saying they did not have a contagious disease; no similar requirement existed for men.

The number of children removed from Republican mothers between 1944 and 1954 was 30,960. These children were not allowed to remain in contact with their families, and many found themselves in centers run by Auxilio Social. When mothers were released from prisons, they were often watched to make sure they were good mothers as defined by the state. Actively surveiled, many women lost custody of new children they had.

The order of instruction made by the Criminal Investigation Court n ° 5 of the Spanish National Audience put the number of children of republican detainees whose identities were supposedly changed in the Civil Registry delivered to families who supported the Francoist regime at 30,960 in the period between 1944 -1954. Spanish associations put the number of stolen children between 1940 and 1990 at closer to 300,000. According to a study published by Ricard Vinyes, between 1944 and 1945, the Patronage of San Pablo accounted for 30,000 children of incarcerated and exiled children, to whom 12,000 would have to be added, protected by the Patronato de la Merced.

Valencia FETE executive committee member Ángela Semper was imprisoned from the end of the Civil War until 1944. She never managed to escape Spain.

The 1944 Penal Code said rape was a punishable offense when a girl was between 12 and 23 if she was a virgin, and between the ages of 17 and 23 if she was not a virgin. The 1944 Penal Code also made it so that in almost all cases, only married women and men they had affairs with could be guilty of adultery; married men were only guilty if they brought their mistresses to live in the marital home. The 1945 Law of Political Responsibilities punished anyone who showed any active or passive affinity towards the Second Republic or towards the "reds". In the Northwest Region of Murcia, only 2.49% of the arrests under the Law of Political Responsibilities involved women. Women guilty of this offense were not always charged this way.

A 1944 edition of Semanario de la SF said, "The life of every woman, despite what she may pretend, is nothing but a continuous desire to find somebody to whom she can succumb. Voluntary dependency, the offering of every minute, every desire and illusion is the most beautiful thing, because it implies the cleaning away of all the bad germs -- vanity, selfishness, frivolity -- by love."

=== 1945 ===
Up until 1945, Nazi Germany collaborated with the Franco regime despite Spain's official neutral position. The end of World War II saw Franco left as the last fascist leader in Western Europe, with other Western nations boycotting the country for a number of years. This contributed to some starvation events in Spain. The economy of Spain was devastated, and people would buy and sell used toothbrushes, and sell fountain pens on installment plans.

The voting age for women changed again in 1945, when the age for some women was lowered to 18. According to Article 5 of the Decree of 29 September 1945, voters included, "Spaniards, neighbors and people over 21 years, or emancipated people over the age of 18, men or women, under whose dependence other persons coexist in the same home."

The Law of Political Responsibilities was only nominally repealed in February 1945. A Comisión Liquidadora de Responsabilidades Políticas (Commission for the Discharge of Political Responsibilities) remained in operation until 1966 when the law was effectively abolished. Between 1939 and 1945, 500,000 persons out a population of 23,000,000 (2% of the population of Spain) were subject to Political Responsibilities proceedings. To relieve prison overcrowding, concentration camps were opened, where prisoners were forced to engage in manual labor.

Numerous obstacles were placed on the work of women, especially married women, and restrictions were placed on their registration in the placement registers and the husband's authorization to be hired. In addition, numerous labor ordinances stipulated that the woman as soon as she got married had to leave her job, being compensated with a dowry. A so-called "plus family" function, established in 1945, served as a financial aid whose purpose was "to strengthen the family and its Christian tradition, the perfect society and the foundation of the Nation." In addition, the access of women to a large part of the bodies of the public administration, especially to superiors, was prevented by law as a lawyer of the State, judge, prosecutor, diplomat, property registrar, notary, labor inspector, exchange agent and stock exchange, etc.

Reforms were made to primary school education in 1945, with the goal of bringing students into political alignment with the state and of ensuring social stability. The Elementary Education Act of 1945 was an important change from the last nineteenth century pedagogy previously used in schools. It was created specifically for the purpose of furthering gender roles by indoctrinating children in these roles at a young age. Girls were taught at this age that their role was to become perfect housewives, that one of their most important roles was to always remain faithful to their husbands, and that they should always delegate to and defer to men. Girls were taught that their future careers were to be housewives. Any other career option would be dishonorable to her family. The Elementary Education Act of 1945 included a set of principles to be implemented in the curriculum that integrated religious, patriotic and nationalism. Article 11 of the 1945 addressed the education of girls, saying "the feminine primary education will prepare especially for domestic household, crafts and industry life." The subjects for girls included in the curriculum for girls: housework, cooking, sewing, gardening, nursing and childcare for the care of children. Primary education was divided into two stages, the first from 6 to 10 years and the second from 10 to 12 years old. Importantly, the new curriculum was sex segregated, with girls being taught their place was home in the home and being given a skill set for that. The Catholic Church was placed in charge of the curriculum in this system, in both private and state run schools. This reform included a requirement that all children had compulsory school attendance from the ages of 6 to 12 and public schools were to receive government subsidies. The Franco government though did not require the state to establish educational facilities in more rural areas as they claimed they lacked funding to do so, which left the Catholic Church and other private organizations in charge of education delivery. Classrooms had pictures of Franco and José Antonio Primo de Rivera. Primary schools started the day with hoisting the Spanish flag, and singing nationalist songs like El cara al sol. National holidays included El día de la victoria, el 18 de Julio, La fiesta de la raza and Día de la Hispanidad.

The 1945 Fuero de los Españoles established that marriage was an indissoluble union. A so-called "plus family" function, established in 1945, served as a financial aid whose purpose was "to strengthen the family and its Christian tradition, the perfect society and the foundation of the Nation." In addition, women were prevented from accessing most careers in the public administration sector. The 1945 Plus de Cargas Familiares had a negative impact on women's ability to work.

Carmen Laforet was the most important Spanish woman novelist during the 1940s, with her novel Nada published in 1945. It challenged the regime by showing a dirty underside that served as a counterpoint to the triumphalism of the Nationalists. Ana María Matute was one of the most important Spanish women novelists of the 1950s and 1960s. Her works were similar to that of Laforet and had Civil War themes, but represented a perspective of a child.

The most significant piece of Spanish lesbian literature in the early and middle Franco period was Oculto sendero by Elena Fortún, which while never officially published until 2017 was circulating by 1945 and told the fictionalized account of a Spanish lesbian in exile. The author was more famous for other works.

=== 1946 ===
Starting in May 1946, Sección Feminina, in conjunction with their magazine Ventanal, began an hour long Monday night weekly radio program that focused on women's writers. Their first interview was with Rosa María Cajal. They would also interview Blanca Espinar, Dolores Pérez Camarero, María José Pomar, Carmen Martín de la Escalara and María Antonia Morales. Despite their intention of promoting women's writers, most of their interviews and commentary were often in support of state goals, namely in reinforcing women as being passive with their primary role being wives and mothers, not writers.

Women led the 1946 factory strikes in Bertrand and Serra de Manresa.

Ads concerning the sale of photographs of Rita Hayworth in the movie Gilda are strictly prohibited.

In 1946, women political prisoners in Madrid's Las Ventas prison held a hunger strike to protest the poor quality of food they were provided. Women from socialist, communist and anarchist organizations came together behind bars to coordinate the strike. While they were successful in seeing food quality improved, prison officials subsequently reorganized the prison population to prevent further political collaboration within the confines of the prison.

=== 1947 ===
A referendum on the Succession Law of 1947 was held, with women being allowed to vote. Despite this, the law prohibited women from being allowed to succeed the Spanish throne. The new law prohibited women from being allowed to succeed the Spanish throne. Voter turnout was alleged by the regime to be 100%. While Pilar Primo de Rivera was loyal to the regime, there were some instances where as leader of the Women's Section she opposed Franco's moves. One instance included the 1947 Law of Succession.

Asunción Cubero Royo was arrested in 1947. Authorities suspected her of planning an attack on the main railway line Barracas and Rubielos de Mora in Aragón, and of serving as a liaison to Guerrilleros de Levante. Guerrilleros de Levante were aligned with PCE, and were their most important group in Aragón in the 1940s. The militant son of Asunción Cubero Royo described their work as, "By 1946, Consejos de Resistencia was strong, women played a fundamental role, incorporated into the struggle through the Consejos de Resistencia, developing mail routes between cities and towns; they are part of the reliable information service. Among other things they work weaving wool, making gloves, jerseys, scarves for the prisoners and guerrillas. [...] The Consejo de Resistencia de la Estación de Rubielos has many links to Albentosa and Los Mases, to which Asunción Cubero Royo belonged (detained at the end of 1947), maintaining the link between the Communist Party and Valencia and the guerrillas. Like others, they work tirelessly knitting for prisoners and guerrillas."

During the Spanish Civil War, PCE adapted the slogan, "Men to front, women to the rearguard." (Spanish: “los hombres al frente, las mujeres a la retaguardia”). This gender divided thinking continued in the Francoist period as PCE rebuilt. Women were to be organized separately from male guerrilla groups, both in the interior and the exterior. With this thinking, Unión de Mujeres Españolas (UME) was created by the PCE, and renamed Unión de Mujeres Antifascistas Españolas (UMAE) in 1947. UMAE attracted large numbers of Spanish exiles in France in the immediate post-war period. It faced more challenges recruiting members in the interior. The group published a magazine in France called “Noticias del interior”, which discussed the activities of UMAE women working in the interior and manifestos written by these militants.

The International Socialist Conference in Zurich in June 1947, with García Perez serving as the secretary of the Feminine Section of PSOE.

=== 1948 ===
"At school, I never understood why they highlighted spiritual exercises around a sexual theme. And on the sexual issue, of course, they never talked about consummating sexual relationships; that only existed in the minds of evil beings. But they did give us class and all kinds of information, especially kisses. I especially admired the screw kiss. They told us how the kids play, how you can never allow a boy to give you his hand, because the hand passes to the arm, and the arm is already lost. The dances, the look of a boy ... It was all sin. I remember that when we prepared the confession, which was weekly, they always made us talk, and it was very difficult for me to talk about the so-called impure desires."

— A woman in Zaragoza of her formal sex education in the 1960s, Actitudes de las mujeres bajo el primer Franquismo: La práctica del aborto en Zaragoza durante los años 40,

Despite legal prohibitions against teaching sex education in the early Franco period, sex education was still taught using other modes, such as an instruction books with names such as Castidad y Juventud (English: Chastity and Youth) which was published in 1948. It borrowed from German models, and was centered around morality of the individual.

Madrid held municipal elections in 1948, the first such elections since the end of the Civil War. Only heads of household could vote, which disenfranchised most women. Voters had few options, all of them involving right-wing candidates, most Falangists, who belonged to official parties or who were unofficial candidates. Records show that was an abstention rate of 40%.

The Madrid municipal elections of 1954 had the same conditions as 1948 for voting. The candidates were primarily made up of official party candidates and monarchists who had become disconnected from the regime. While allowing these right wing monarchists to run, government used all its available tools to discourage voters from supporting them. Voter abstention in these elections was 67%. The official party candidates got votes ranging between 7,000 and 22,000 while the highest vote total for a monarchist candidate was 7,600.

García Perez moved to Mexico in February 1948. Carmen García Bloise joined the socialist movement as the daughter of a Spanish PSOE exile in Paris in 1948 when joined Juventudes Socialistas.

=== 1949 ===
After December 1949, there is no evidence that women were allowed in an Agrupación Guerrillera de Levante y Aragón. Women were placed far away from guerrillas in safe houses holding multiple families. Esperanza Martínez and Remedios Montero were the only two women allowed to live in the mountains among guerrillas in Aragon after December 1949, but they held lower status, were not allowed to stand guard and were frequently moved to protected areas. At the same time, they were not given menial tasks, such as being required to cook and clean.

The 16 July 1949 Law of Middle and Professional Schools established specialized courses to support industries such as farming, industrial labor, mining and fishing. It also established professional courses for women. These educational opportunities were expanded with the 20 July 1955 Law of Professional Industrial Training, which saw women's opportunities increase with access to technical training in industries such as fishing and administration. Escuelas de Hogar taught tomestic activities like cooking and infant care.

Julene Azpeitia was a teacher involved with PNV before the Civil War. She fled Spain following the war, but returned by 1947 where she took a teaching job at a Provincial Councila school of Bilbao. The regime punished her with jail time in 1949, and was let out in 1952.
