= Antonio González Pacheco =

Spanish police officer (1946–2020)

Billy el Niño
- Born: Antonio González Pacheco; 10 October 1946; Aldea del Cano, Spain
- Died: 7 May 2020 (aged 73); Madrid, Spain
- Occupation: Police inspector

Antonio González Pacheco (10 October 1946 – 7 May 2020), known also as Billy the Kid (Billy el Niño), was a Spanish police inspector in Francoist Spain who was charged with 13 counts of torture and sought for extradition by an Argentine judge in 2014. María Romilda Servini had called for the indictment. The request for extradition was refused by the Spanish High Court on the basis that the statute of limitations had run out on the accusation against him.

He competed in a half-marathon in Madrid in 2010.

He previously had a pension that was 1.5 times larger than the usual one and he had four medals of honour, which was revealed by a report from the Ministry of the Interior in 2018. That year interior minister Fernando Grande-Marlaska began efforts to determine whether the state can terminate the honours and pensions.

== Death ==
He died on 7 May 2020 from COVID-19 during the COVID-19 pandemic in Spain at the age of 73.

== See also ==
- Political prisoners in Francoist Spain
- Human rights in Spain
- Argentina-Spain relations
