= Julius Klaus-Stiftung =

Swiss eugenic research foundation established in 1921

Julius Klaus Foundation
- Julius Klaus-Stiftung für Genetik und Sozialanthropologie
- Formation: 1921
- Founder: Julius Klaus
- Type: Foundation
- Legal status: Active (renamed)
- Purpose: Eugenics research, heredity studies, racial hygiene
- Headquarters: Zurich, Switzerland
- Fields: Genetics, Anthropology, Eugenics
- President: Otto Schlaginhaufen (1921-1968)
- Key people: Julius Klaus, Otto Schlaginhaufen, Alfred Ernst, Adolf Barth
- Affiliations: International Federation of Eugenics Organizations
- Endowment: 1.3 million Swiss francs (1921)
- Formerly called: Julius Klaus-Stiftung für Vererbungsforschung, Sozialanthropologie und Rassenhygiene

The Julius Klaus Foundation (German: Julius Klaus-Stiftung für Genetik und Sozialanthropologie, "Julius Klaus Foundation for Genetics and Social Anthropology") is a Swiss research foundation currently focused on genetics and social anthropology. The foundation operates under the auspices of the University of Zurich and supports research in modern genetic sciences. While still active, it is no longer a leading scientific actor.

It was originally established in 1921 as the Julius Klaus-Stiftung für Vererbungsforschung, Sozialanthropologie und Rassenhygiene ("Julius Klaus Foundation for Heredity Research, Social Anthropology and Racial Hygiene"), as a eugenics research institution with substantial financial resources. For several decades, it served as Switzerland's principal eugenic institution, promoting heredity and "racial" research oriented toward eugenics at the University of Zurich. The foundation contributed significantly to maintaining Zurich as a global center of eugenic research even after World War I.

== Foundation and early leadership ==
Julius Klaus, who came from a wealthy industrial family in the Zurich Oberland, decided to dedicate his entire fortune to "racial hygiene" after his death. He established a foundation for this purpose, which included his family physician Adolf Barth, anthropologist Otto Schlaginhaufen, and botanist Alfred Ernst. Schlaginhaufen and Ernst, who had conducted research in colonial contexts in Southeast Asia, significantly shaped the institution. They were the principal drafters of the foundation's regulations and served on its board of directors for nearly half a century, with Schlaginhaufen serving as president from 1921 to 1968.

The foundation's statutes, recognized as a public foundation by the Zurich government in 1921, defined its goals as encompassing all "scientifically-based efforts [...] whose purpose is the preparation and implementation of practical reforms for the improvement of the white race." This formulation reflected a typical amalgamation of racism and eugenics characteristic of the eugenic movement that had gained momentum after World War I.

== International connections ==
In 1923, the Julius Klaus Foundation joined the Permanent International Eugenics Committee (from 1925 the International Federation of Eugenics Organizations, IFEO). In 1934, it hosted the IFEO's international assembly, which was increasingly controlled and instrumentalized by the Nazis to propagate worldwide the eugenic measures adopted in Germany.

== Relationship with University of Zurich ==
The foundation maintained close ties with the University of Zurich. Of the seven members of the board of directors, five continuously belonged to the university's faculty, including influential scientists in the fields of anthropology, medicine, botany, zoology, and political economy, as well as serving rectors. A member of the cantonal government of Zurich also sat on the board of directors. Notable members included, besides Schlaginhaufen and Ernst, councilors of state Oskar Wettstein and Robert Briner, as well as professors Heinrich Zangger, Eugen Grossmann, Hans Steiner, Alfred Vogt, Wilhelm Löffler, Hans Rudolf Schinz, and Ernst Hadorn.

== Research activities and funding ==
Endowed with capital of approximately 1.3 million Swiss francs in 1921, the Julius Klaus Foundation played an important role in research policy. It primarily funded heredity studies, which were intended to constitute the scientific basis for "racial hygiene" reforms. The projects it supported included research on "race," medical genetics analyses, and experimental genetics work. The foundation also created a library and published its own journal, the Archiv der Julius Klaus-Stiftung für Vererbungsforschung, Sozialanthropologie und Rassenhygiene. It also allocated smaller sums to "practical racial hygiene," including eugenic propaganda, marriage counseling, and sterilization.

== Post-war transformation ==
The Julius Klaus Foundation only lost its importance after World War II. In 1971, the board of directors decided to change the foundation's name and goals, as concepts such as "racial hygiene" were too strongly reminiscent of Nazism. Renamed the Julius Klaus-Stiftung für Genetik und Sozialanthropologie ("Julius Klaus Foundation for Genetics and Social Anthropology"), it now aimed to promote "human hereditary health." In the 21st century, the Julius Klaus Foundation remains active but is no longer a leading scientific actor.

== Bibliography ==
- Archiv der Julius Klaus-Stiftung für Vererbungsforschung, Sozialanthropologie und Rassenhygiene, 1925-1971.
- Keller, Christoph: Der Schädelvermesser. Otto Schlaginhaufen – Anthropologe und Rassenhygieniker. Eine biographische Reportage, 1995.
- Schmutz, Hans-Konrad: "Schokolade und Messzirkel – Zur Steuerung rassenhygienischer Forschungsprojekte an der Universität Zürich in den zwanziger und dreissiger Jahren", in: Höxtermann, Ekkehard; Kaasch, Joachim; Kaasch, Michael (ed.): Berichte zur Geschichte und Theorie der Ökologie und weitere Beiträge zur 9. Jahrestagung der DGGTB in Neuburg a. d. Donau 2000, 2001, pp. 305–317.
- Germann, Pascal: Laboratorien der Vererbung. Rassenforschung und Humangenetik in der Schweiz, 1900-1970, 2016.
