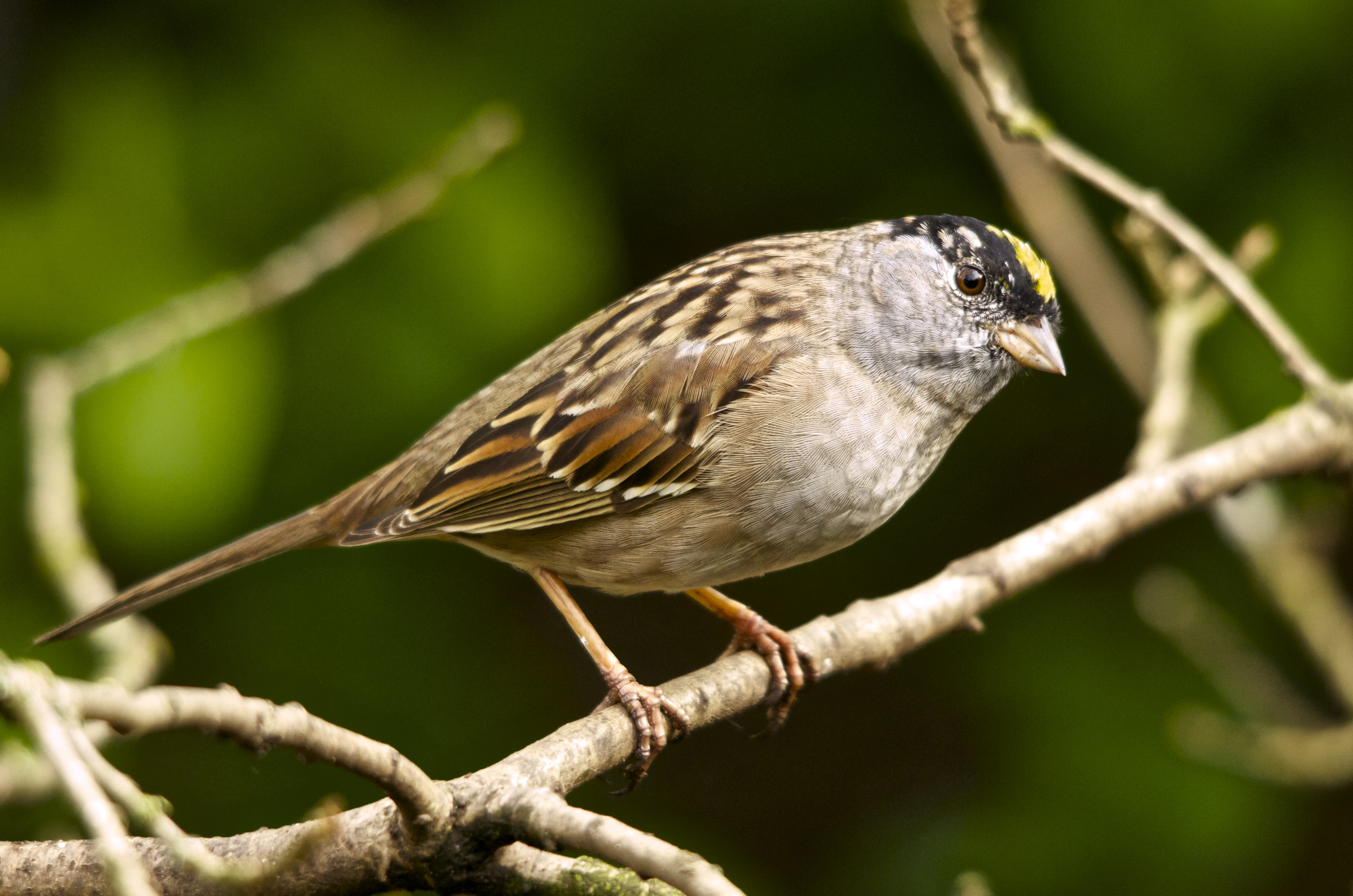
- Adult; males and females are similarly plumaged

Conservation status
- Least Concern (IUCN 3.1)

Scientific classification
- Kingdom: Animalia
- Phylum: Chordata
- Class: Aves
- Order: Passeriformes
- Family: Passerellidae
- Genus: Zonotrichia
- Species: Z. atricapilla

Binomial name
- Zonotrichia atricapilla (Gmelin, 1789)
- Range of Z. atricapilla Breeding Migration Nonbreeding

Synonyms
- Emberiza atricapilla Gmelin, 1789; Zonotrichia coronata Pallas, 1844

= Golden-crowned sparrow =

Golden-crowned sparrow Temporal range: Late Pleistocene–present

Species of bird

The golden-crowned sparrow (Zonotrichia atricapilla) is a large New World sparrow found in the western part of North America.

== Systematics ==
The golden-crowned sparrow is one of five species in the genus Zonotrichia, a group of large American sparrows. It has no subspecies. It is a sister species with, and very closely related to, the white-crowned sparrow; studies of mitochondrial DNA show the two evolved into separate species very recently in geologic time. The white-throated sparrow is a slightly more distant relative. Hybridization with both white-crowned and white-throated sparrows has been reported.

Ornithologist John Latham first described the species in his book General Synopsis of Birds in 1781, but he thought it was a variety of what he called the "black-crowned bunting" and neglected to give it a scientific name. That lapse was corrected in 1789, when Johann Friedrich Gmelin assigned it the name Emberiza atricapilla in the 13th edition of Systema naturae. Various authorities in the 1800s (including John James Audubon) placed it in the genus Fringilla, but many assigned it to its current genus, Zonotrichia, once William Swainson had established that genus. Peter Simon Pallas described the same species in 1844 as Zonotrichia coronata and, for much of the 1800s, this was the name used by most authorities.

In the bird's scientific name, the genus name Zonotrichia is a compound word: from Ancient Greek ζώνη (zone, transl. band) and θρίξ (thrix, transl. hair). The specific epithet atricapilla is Latin for "black-haired": ater (transl. black) and capillus (transl. hair of the head).

== Description ==
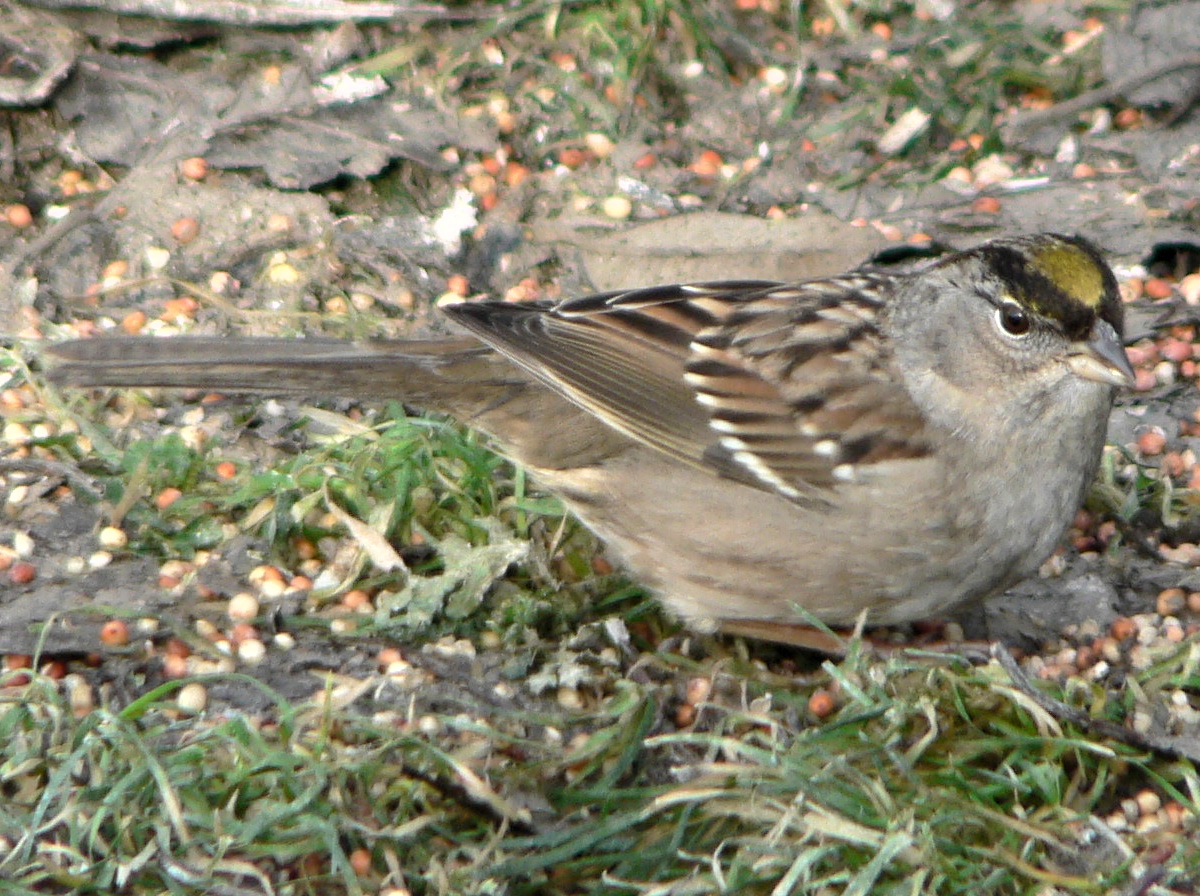
The size and color of its crown patches help to determine a bird's status among its flock mates.

Measuring 15–18 cm (6–7 in) in length with a wingspan of 24.75 cm (9.74 in) and ranging from 19.0 to 35.4 g (0.67 to 1.25 oz) in mass, the adult golden-crowned sparrow is fairly large for an American sparrow. Like all Zonotrichia sparrows, it has a relatively long, square-tipped tail and a slightly peaked crown. Males and females are similarly plumaged, though males average slightly larger than females. Other than a plain gray nape, the adult's upperparts are grayish-brown, with broad brownish-black streaks on the back and scapulars, and an unstreaked rump. Its underparts are gray, slightly paler on the belly and buffier on the flanks. Its wings and tail are brown, and it shows two white wing bars. Its legs are pale brown, and its bill is dark, with the upper mandible darker than the lower. Its iris is brown.

In the breeding season, the golden-crowned sparrow has a broad yellow central crown stripe which becomes pale gray towards the back of the head.

=== Similar species ===
Although its distinctive crown patches allow for easy identification of the adult golden-crowned sparrow in breeding plumage, an immature or non-breeding bird might be mistaken for a white-crowned or white-throated sparrow. It is distinguished from the former by its crown pattern and dusky (rather than pale pink or yellowish) bill, and from the latter by its larger size, plain throat, and lack of a buff-colored central crown stripe. A young or non-breeding bird may also resemble a female house sparrow, but can be distinguished by its larger size, darker plumage, longer tail and (usually) some amount of dull yellow feathering on its forehead.

== Distribution and habitat ==
The golden-crowned sparrow is common along the western edge of North America. It is a migratory species, breeding from north-central Alaska (including the Aleutian Islands as far west as Unimak Island) and central Yukon south to the northwestern corner of the US state of Washington, and wintering from southern coastal Alaska to northern Baja California. It has been recorded as a vagrant in Japan and Russia, and occasionally strays as far as the eastern coast of North America, from Nova Scotia to Florida. In the winter, it is generally found in brushy areas, (particularly chaparral), usually in dense shrubs.

== Behavior ==
The golden-crowned sparrow spends its winters in flocks with conspecifics, but also often with other sparrow species, especially white-crowned sparrows. Flock territories typically range in size from 15–20 acres (6.1–8.1 ha). Individual birds remain with the same flock for the entire winter and return to the same wintering site each year. Studies show that the golden-crowned sparrow's black and gold head stripes are used to signal social status in wintering flocks. Such signals help to reduce the incidence of confrontation between flock mates, thereby reducing such potential costs as injuries or the unnecessary expenditure of energy. The size and color of a bird's crown patches are better predictors of dominance (indicating which bird will avoid confrontation with another) than are the bird's size or sex. Birds with similarly sized gold crown patches are far more likely to engage in agonistic behavior than are those showing differences, and the outcomes of such confrontations can be predicted based on the color of their black stripes. This suggests that social status in this species involves more complexity than a single signal will allow, and that the multiple color patches allow a gradient of interactions between flock mates.

=== Feeding ===
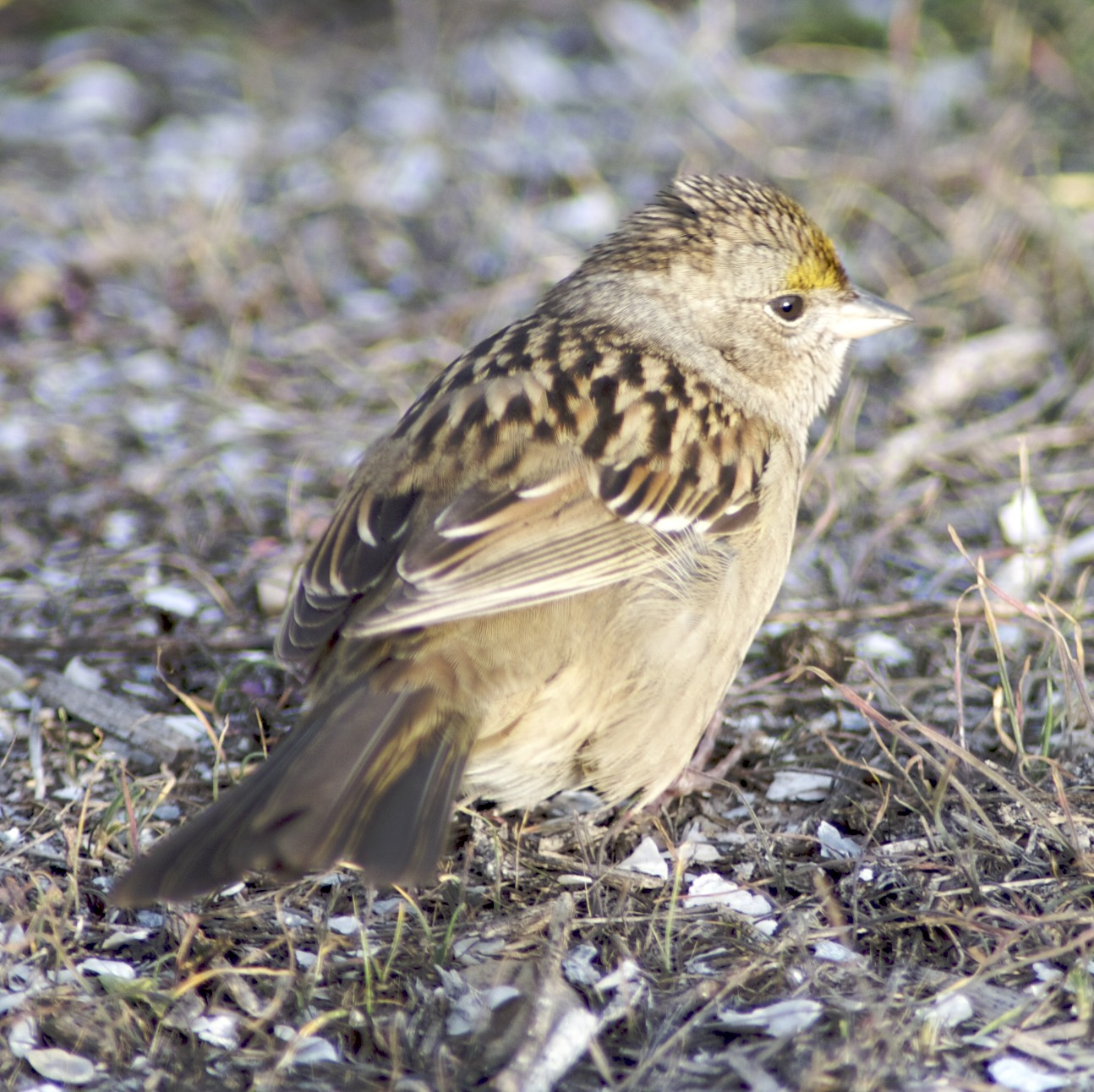
Immature birds lack the distinctive head stripes of adults.

Like other Zonotrichia sparrows, the golden-crowned sparrow feeds on the ground, where it forages by pecking and scratching. It also occasionally leaps into the air after insects or gleans them from foliage. Its diet, particularly in the winter, consists primarily of plant material; items include seeds, berries, flowers and buds, as well as the occasional crawling insect. The species is an important destroyer of weed seeds on the Pacific Slope, with various ryegrasses, fescues, bromes, pigweeds, chickweeds, mulleins, filarees, common knotweed and poison oak among its known food sources. Paired birds commonly forage together, with the male following the female.

The species shows two weight peaks each year: one in mid-winter, and a much higher one shortly before it begins its migration north in the spring. The latter elevated weight is maintained until the bird reaches its breeding grounds.

=== Breeding and lifespan ===
The breeding season runs from late May through early August. Males on the breeding ground sing throughout the day from an exposed perch. The nest is a bulky cup built by the female. Located on the ground (or occasionally on a low branch), it is made of dried plant material and lined with hair, fine grasses and feathers. The female typically lays five eggs, though clutches of three to five have been recorded. The eggs, which are pale green, oval and heavily spotted with reddish-brown, measure (0.65–0.67)×(0.80–0.82) mm (0.026×0.031 in). They are incubated by the female for 11–14 days. The young are altricial—born naked, blind and helpless—but fledge from the nest within 12 days. Both parents feed the young.

The oldest known golden-crowned sparrow lived at least 10 years and 6 months; it was banded as an adult one winter, and recaptured nine winters later.

=== Voice ===
The song is a three-note whistle, descending in pitch. It is very distinctive, and often described as oh-dear-me. The call also sounds like the words I'm so weary, so Alaskan gold miners along the trails called this bird "Weary Willie". However, birds in the mountains of British Columbia have been reported to have a trill on the third note, rather than a clear whistle as in other populations. These songs are heard mainly in the breeding season, but also in the wintering grounds just after fall migration as well as just before they take off for spring migration. Like other Zonotrichia sparrows, it has a sharp, distinctive call note, which is transcribed as tsew.

== Conservation and threats ==
The International Union for Conservation of Nature lists the golden-crowned sparrow as a species of least concern. The sparrow's extremely large range and population size lift it well above the thresholds used to designate an imperiled species, and data from Christmas Bird Counts show that its numbers are stable or increasing. Throughout its range, it is protected by the Migratory Bird Treaty Act of 1918, and many of its wintering grounds are in protected areas, including national forests and national wildlife refuges.

As with other flock-living passerines, the golden-crowned sparrow is prone to elevated levels of feather mites. It serves as a host for chiggers, chewing lice, including Machaerilaemus maestum, and hippoboscid flies, including Ornithoica vicina. Diseases which are known to affect it include canarypox. A number of predators prey on the golden-crowned sparrow at some point in its life cycle. These include northern and loggerhead shrikes, sharp-shinned and Cooper's hawks, northern harriers, merlins, mountain pygmy owls, western screech owls, barn owls, feral cats, and Columbian ground squirrels.
