= Supergene =

Cluster of genes

A supergene is a chromosomal region encompassing multiple neighboring genes that are inherited together because of close genetic linkage, i.e. much less recombination than would normally be expected. This mode of inheritance can be due to genomic rearrangements between supergene variants.

A supergene region can contain few, functionally related genes that clearly contribute to a shared phenotype.

== Phenotypes encoded by supergenes ==
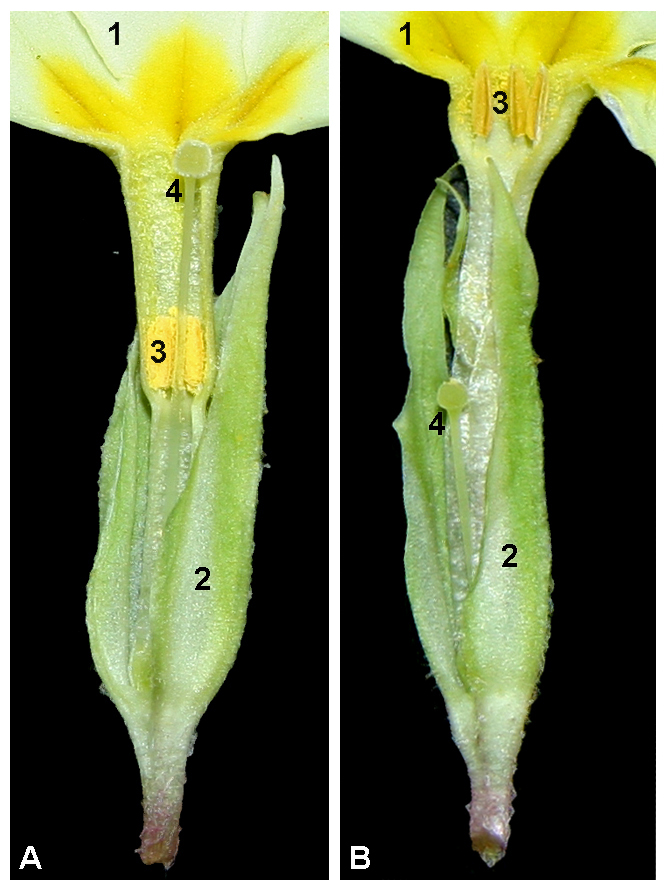
Pin (A) and thrum (B) flowers of Primula vulgaris are controlled by a supergene.

Supergenes have cis-effects due to multiple loci (which may be within a gene, or within a single gene's regulatory region), and tight linkage. They are classically polymorphic, whereby different supergene variants code for different phenotypes.

Classic supergenes include many sex chromosomes, the Primula heterostyly locus, which controls "pin" and "thrum" types, and the locus controlling Batesian mimetic polymorphism in Papilio memnon butterflies. Recently discovered supergenes are responsible for complex phenotypes including color-morphs in the white-throated sparrow.

Primula supergene. Pin and thrum morphs of Primula have effects on genetic compatibility (pin style x thrum pollen, or thrum style x pin pollen matings are successful, while pin x pin, and thrum x thrum matings are rarely successful due to pollen-style incompatibility), and have different style length, anther height in the corolla tube, pollen size, and papilla size on the stigma. Each of these effects is controlled by a different locus in the same supergene, but recombinants are occasionally found with traits combining those of "pin" and "thrum" morphs.

== Origin ==
The earliest use of the term "supergene" may be in an article by A. Ernst (1936) in the journal Archiv der Julius Klaus-Stiftung für Vererbungsforschung, Sozialanthropologie und Rassenhygiene.

Classically, supergenes were hypothesized to have evolved from less tightly-linked genes coming together via chromosomal rearrangement or reduced crossing over, due to selection for particular multilocus phenotypes. For instance, in Batesian mimicry supergenes in species such as Papilio memnon, genes are required to affect hind-wing, fore-wing, and body colour, and also the presence or absence of long projections (the "tails" of swallowtail butterflies).

The case for the accumulative origin for supergenes was originally based on the work of Nabours on polymorphism for colour and pattern in grouse locusts (Tetrigidae). In Acridium arenosum the colour-patterns are controlled by thirteen genes on the same chromosome, which reassort (recombine) fairly easily. They also occur in Apotettix eurycephalus where they form two tightly linked groups, between which there is 7% crossing-over. Furthermore, in Paratettix texanus there appears to be complete suppression of crossing-over among 24 out of 25 of the colour-pattern genes, which can be distinguished by comparing their effects with those found in other species. Analysis of Nabour's data by Darlington & Mather concluded that the genes responsible for the morphs of Paratettix texanus have been gradually aggregated into a group which acts as a single switch-mechanism. This explanation was accepted by E.B. Ford and incorporated into his accounts of ecological genetics.

This process might involve suppression of crossing-over, translocation of chromosome fragments and possibly occasional cistron duplication. That crossing-over can be suppressed by selection has been known for many years; Detlefsen and Roberts were able to reduce recombination between the loci for white eyes (w) and miniature wings (m) in Drosophila melanogaster from the normal 36% to 6% in one line and 0.6% in another.

Debate has tended to centre round the question, could the component genes in a super-gene have started off on separate chromosomes, with subsequent reorganization, or is it necessary for them to start on the same chromosome? Many scientists today believe the latter, because some linkage disequilibrium is initially needed to select for tighter linkage, and linkage disequilibrium requires both the previous existence of polymorphisms via some other process, like natural selection, favouring gene combinations. If genes are weakly linked, it is probable that the rarer advantageous haplotype dies out, leading to the loss of polymorphism at the other locus.

Most people, following J.R.G. Turner, therefore argue that supergenes arose in situ due to selection for correlated and epistatic traits, which just happened to have been possible to select via the existence of suitable loci closely linked to the original variant. Turner calls this a "sieve" explanation, and the Turner explanation might be called the "Turner sieve" hypothesis. Maynard Smith agreed with this view in his authoritative textbook. Nevertheless, the question is not definitively settled. The problem is connected to an even larger question, the evolution of evolvability.

== Genomic structure ==
Genomic rearrangements can suppress recombination. While chromosomal inversions are the most commonly studied rearrangements in this context, complex rearrangements (i.e., nested inversions, inverted translocations, etc.) can create similar conditions and are an active field of study.

Suppressed recombination leads to accumulation of repetitive elements (including to degenerative expansion) in early supergene evolution [Ref Papaya, Fire ant], and to changes in gene expression [ref Fire ant, anther smut].

== Gene complexes are not supergenes ==
Gene complexes, in contrast, are simply tightly linked groups of genes, often created via gene duplication (sometimes called tandem duplication if the duplicates remain side-by-side). Here, each gene has similar though slightly diverged function. For example, the human major histocompatibility complex (MHC) region is a complex of tightly linked genes all acting in the immune system, but has no claim to be a supergene, even though the component genes very likely have epistatic effects and are in strong disequilibrium due in part to selection.

== Reading ==
Berdan EL, Flatt T, Kozak GM, Lotterhos KE, Wielstra B. 2022 Genomic architecture of supergenes: connecting form and function. Phil. Trans. R. Soc. B 377: 20210192
