= Anton Rehmann =

Austrian botanist

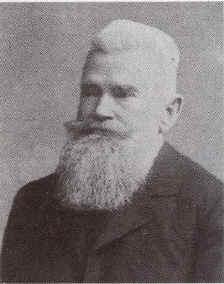
- Born: Antoni Rehman; 13 May 1840; Free City of Kraków
- Died: 13 January 1917 (aged 76); Lwow, Galicia
- Education: Jagiellonian University
- Scientific career
- Workplaces: Jagiellonian University; University of Lviv
- Author abbrev. (botany): Rehmann

Antoni Rehman aka Anton Rehman (13 May 1840 Kraków – 13 January 1917 Lwow, Galicia) was a Polish geographer, geomorphologist, botanist and explorer. He published mostly in German journals in Austria and is regarded as an Austrian botanist, as Galicia was at that time part of the Austro-Hungarian Empire.

Anton was the son of master chimney sweeps Józef Rehman (1812–1882) and Anna Piotrowski. From 1860 to 1863 he studied science and geography at the Jagiellonian University in Krakow and in 1864 was awarded a PhD. in Botany, after specialising in the bryophytes. In 1865 he explored the steppes of Podolia, the banks of the Dniester and the Tschornohora Mountains in Ukraine. In 1866–67 he studied the anatomy of plants in Munich with Carl Wilhelm von Naegeli. In 1868 he traveled through southern Russia and a year later was appointed professor of Plant Anatomy at the University of Krakow.

Between 1873 and 1874 he traveled to the Caucasus and the Crimea. He traveled through South Africa from 1875 to 1877 and again from 1879 to 1880, becoming acquainted with the San, the Khoikhoi, and the Bantu. While in South Africa he collected over 9 000 specimens, and Ignaz von Szyszylowicz made a start in their listing. Two parts of the listing appeared in a Polish journal in 1887–88, but because of friction the specimens were returned to Rehmann who sold them to Schinz in 1889. Dixon and Gepp listed his 680 mosses in a Kew Bulletin of 1923. These included the collections of John Medley Wood and McLea which Rehmann had acquired while in South Africa. His first visit covered the George and Knysna areas from where he moved on to Cape Town, Tulbagh, Ceres, Worcester, Touws River, Matjiesfontein and back to Ceres.

In 1882 he became a professor at Lviv University, while from 1884 to 1897 he was botanist and lecturer at the Veterinary College. From 1887 he was Dean of the Faculty of Philosophy and in 1888–89 the rector. He was a member of the Scientific Society in Krakow, the physiographic Commission of the Cracow Academy of scholarship and the Natural Science Nicholas Copernicus Society, serving as president in 1888–89. In 1910 he retired.

During his work and travels, he collected enormous amounts of herbarium material. To this day his specimens may be found in herbaria around the world, including those of Krakow and Lemberg. The bryophyte specimens were partly organised and distributed in exsiccatae and exsiccata-like series, the first under the title Musci Austro-Africani (1875-77).) He described several new plant taxa, including a variety of the herb wormwood (Artemisia absinthium L. var calcigena Rehm.) that is considered endemic to the Pieniny mountains and is on the Red list of threatened plants in Poland.

== Publications ==
- Travel sketches from southern Africa (1881)
- Echoes from southern Africa (1884)
- The Tatras from a physical and geographical perspective (1895)
