= Schinz =

Schinz is a Swiss surname. Notable people with the surname include:

- Albert Schinz (1870–1943), American editor and academic
- Hans Schinz (1858–1941), Swiss explorer and botanist
- Hans Rudolf Schinz (1891–1966), Swiss radiologist
- Heinrich Rudolf Schinz (1777–1861), Swiss physician and naturalist
