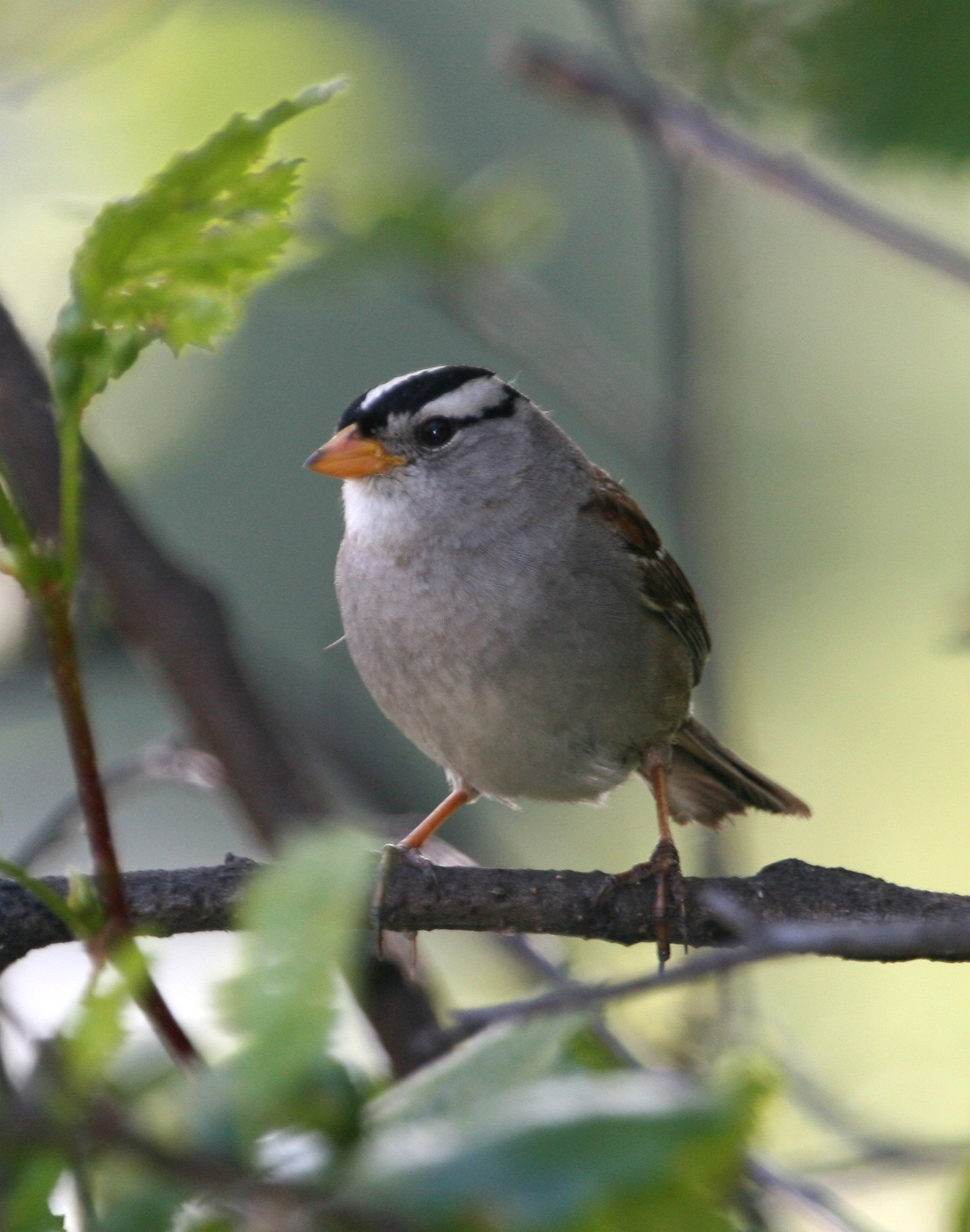
- White-crowned sparrow (Zonotrichia leucophrys)

Scientific classification
- Kingdom: Animalia
- Phylum: Chordata
- Class: Aves
- Order: Passeriformes
- Family: Passerellidae
- Genus: Zonotrichia; Swainson, 1832

Type species
- Zonotrichia albicollis Latham, 1790

Species
- Z. leucophrys Z. albicollis Z. atricapilla Z. capensis Z. querula †Z. robusta

= Zonotrichia =

Genus of birds

Zonotrichia is a genus of five extant American sparrows of the family Passerellidae. Four of the species are North American, but the rufous-collared sparrow breeds in highlands from the extreme southeast of Mexico to Tierra del Fuego, and on Hispaniola.

== Etymology ==
The genus name Zonotrichia is from Ancient Greek ζώνη (zone, transl. band) and θρίξ (thrix, transl. hair).

== Species ==
The species in the genus Zonotrichia are:

Image	Scientific name	Common name	Distribution
	Zonotrichia leucophrys	White-crowned sparrow	North America
	Zonotrichia albicollis	White-throated sparrow	Canada and New England
	Zonotrichia atricapilla	Golden-crowned sparrow	north-central Alaska (including the Aleutian Islands as far west as Unimak Island) and central Yukon south to the northwestern corner of the US state of Washington, and wintering from southern coastal Alaska to northern Baja California
	Zonotrichia capensis	Rufous-collared sparrow	south-east of Mexico to Tierra del Fuego, and on the island of Hispaniola
	Zonotrichia querula	Harris's sparrow	north part of central Canada (primarily the Northwest Territories and Nunavut, ranging slightly into northern Manitoba and Saskatchewan)
	†Zonotrichia robusta		Miramar Formation, Argentina (Pleistocene)

These birds have brown backs streaked with black, and distinctive head markings. Their cup nests, built by the female, are of plant material lined with fine grasses and constructed on the ground, low in a tree or bush, or in a niche in a wall.

The female lays brown-blotched greenish-blue or greenish white eggs, which she incubates for 12–14 days. The male helps in feeding the chicks.

Zonotrichia sparrows feed on the ground on seeds, fallen grain, insects and spiders.
