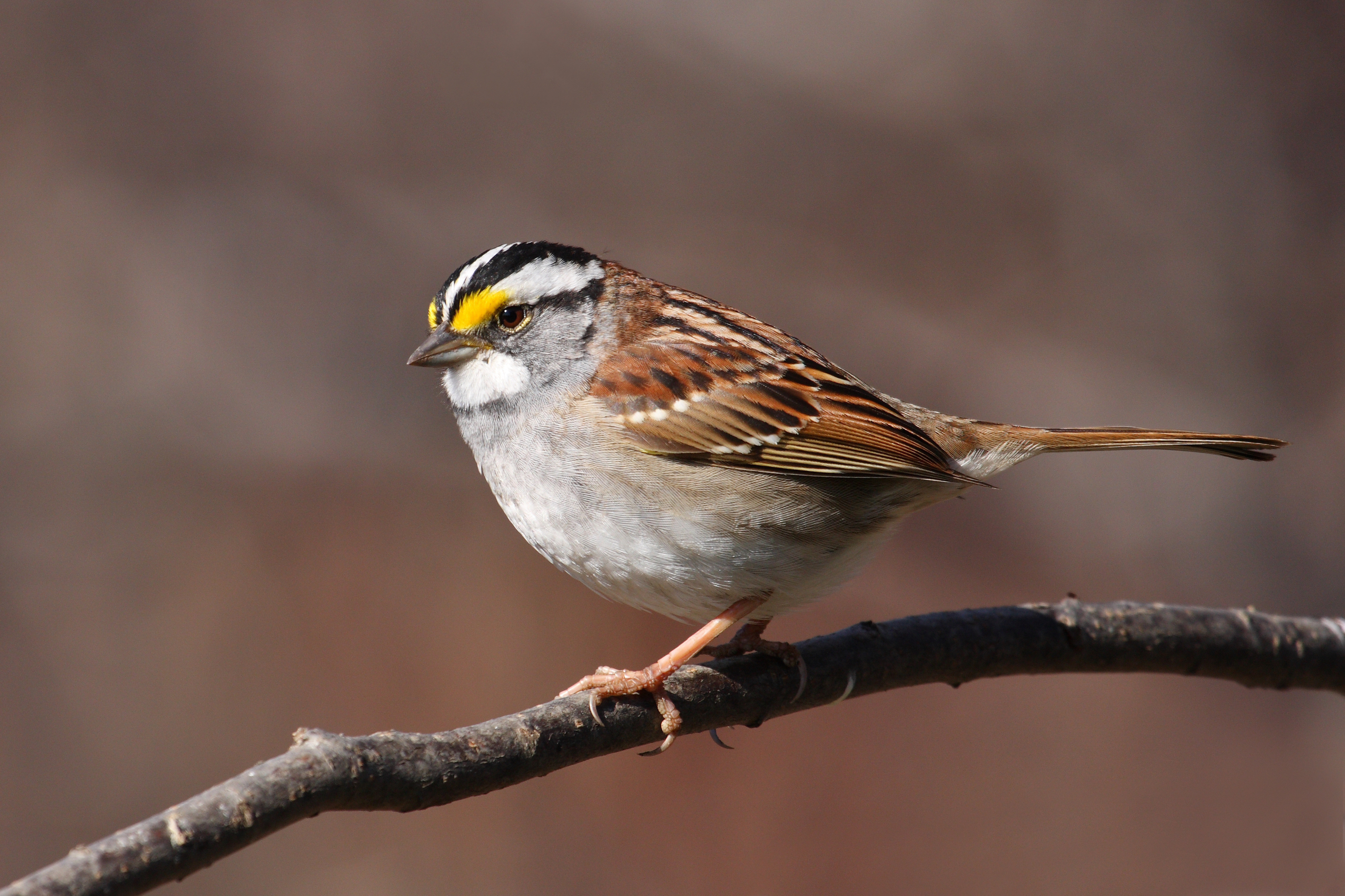
- White-throated sparrow in Cap Tourmente National Wildlife Area, Quebec, Canada

Conservation status
- Least Concern (IUCN 3.1)

Scientific classification
- Kingdom: Animalia
- Phylum: Chordata
- Class: Aves
- Order: Passeriformes
- Family: Passerellidae
- Genus: Zonotrichia
- Species: Z. albicollis

Binomial name
- Zonotrichia albicollis (Gmelin, JF, 1789)
- Range Year-round Breeding areas Migration areas Non-breeding areas

Audio
- Song

= White-throated sparrow =

Species of bird

The white-throated sparrow (Zonotrichia albicollis) is a passerine bird of the New World sparrow family Passerellidae. It breeds in northern North America and winters in the southern United States.

== Taxonomy ==
In 1760 the English naturalist George Edwards included an illustration and a description of the white-throated sparrow in the second volume of his Gleanings of Natural History. He used the current English name. Edwards based his hand-coloured etching on a "neat drawing in colours" supplied by the American naturalist William Bartram from Philadelphia in Pennsylvania. When the German naturalist Johann Friedrich Gmelin revised and expanded Carl Linnaeus's Systema Naturae in 1789 he included the white-throated sparrow. He placed it with the finches in the genus Fringilla and coined the binomial name Fringilla albicollis. The white-throated sparrow is now one of five American sparrows placed in the genus Zonotrichia that was introduced by William Swainson in 1832. The genus name is from Ancient Greek ζωνη (zōnē) meaning "band" and θριξ (thrix), τριχος (trikhos) meaning "hair". The specific epithet albicollis combines Latin albus meaning "white" with Modern Latin -collis meaning "necked". The species is monotypic: no subspecies are recognised.

== Description ==
The white-throated sparrow is a passerine bird of the New World sparrow family Passerellidae. It measures 15 to 19 cm (5.9 to 7.5 in) in length with a wingspan of 23 cm (9.1 in). Typical weight is 22 to 32 g (0.78 to 1.13 oz), with an average of 26 g (0.92 oz). Among standard measurements, the wing chord is 6.3 to 7.9 cm (2.5 to 3.1 in), the tail is 6.8 to 7.7 cm (2.7 to 3.0 in), the bill is 1 to 1.2 cm (0.39 to 0.47 in) and the tarsus is 2.2 to 2.4 cm (0.87 to 0.94 in). They are similar in appearance to the white-crowned sparrow, but with white throat markings and yellow lores.

There are two adult plumage variations known as the tan-striped and white-striped forms. On the white-striped form the crown is black with a white central stripe. The supercilium is white as well. The auriculars are gray with the upper edge forming a black eye line.

On the tan form, the crown is dark brown with a tan central stripe. The supercilium is tan as well. The auriculars are gray/light brown with the upper edge forming a brown eye line. Both variations feature dark eyes, a white throat, yellow lores and gray bill. There is variation and some individuals may show dark lateral stripes of each side of the throat.

They almost always pair with the opposite color morph for breeding. The two color morphs occur in approximately equal numbers. Both male and female white-striped birds are more aggressive than tan-striped birds during the breeding season. The aggression is linked to an increased rate of estrogen receptor alpha expression in white-striped birds.

The breast has gray/tan streaks and the streaks continue down the flanks but the belly is generally light gray. The wings are rufous with two distinct white wing bars. Sexes are morphologically similar.

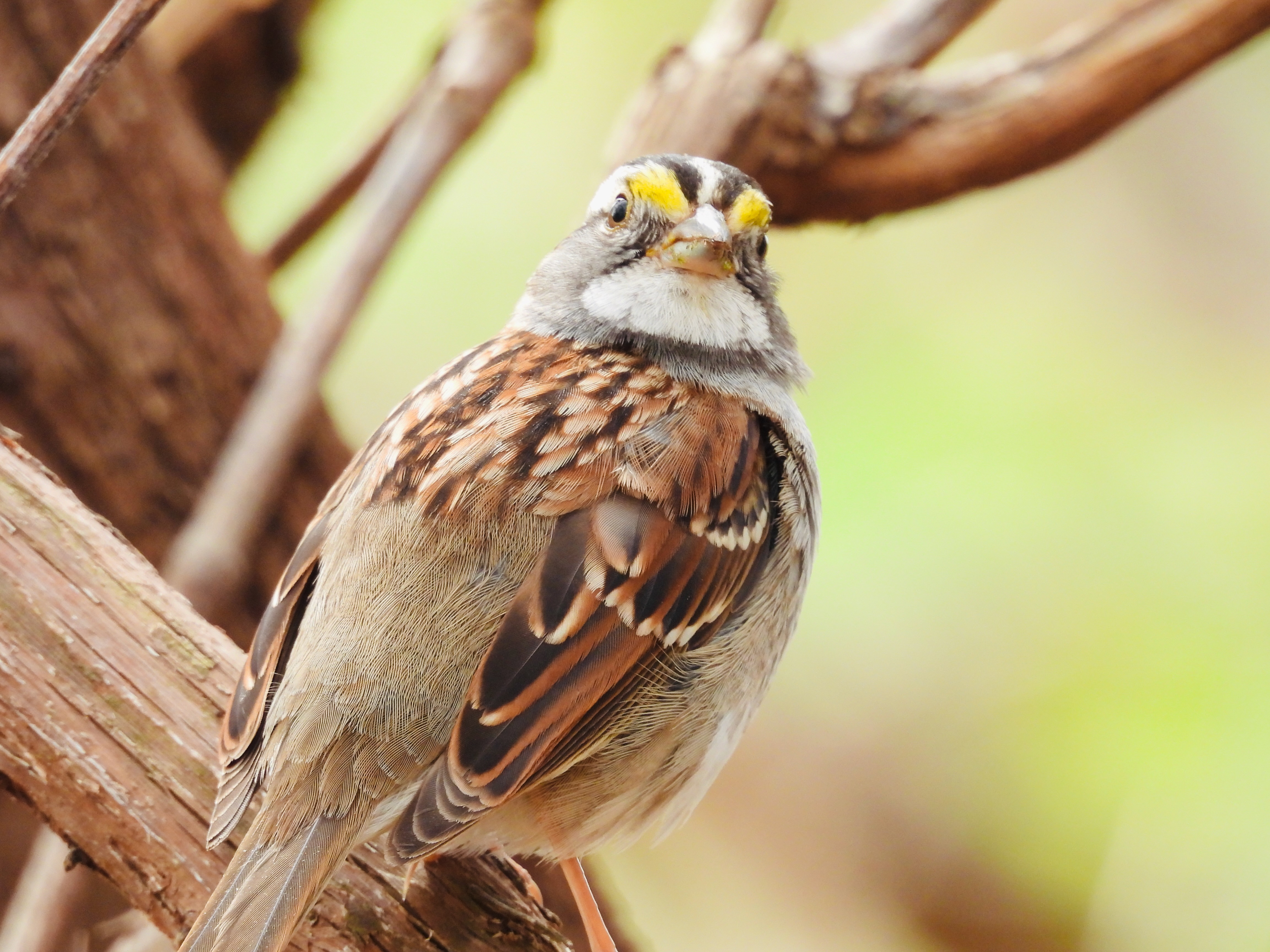
Head turned toward viewer, showing eponymous white throat; in Virginia.

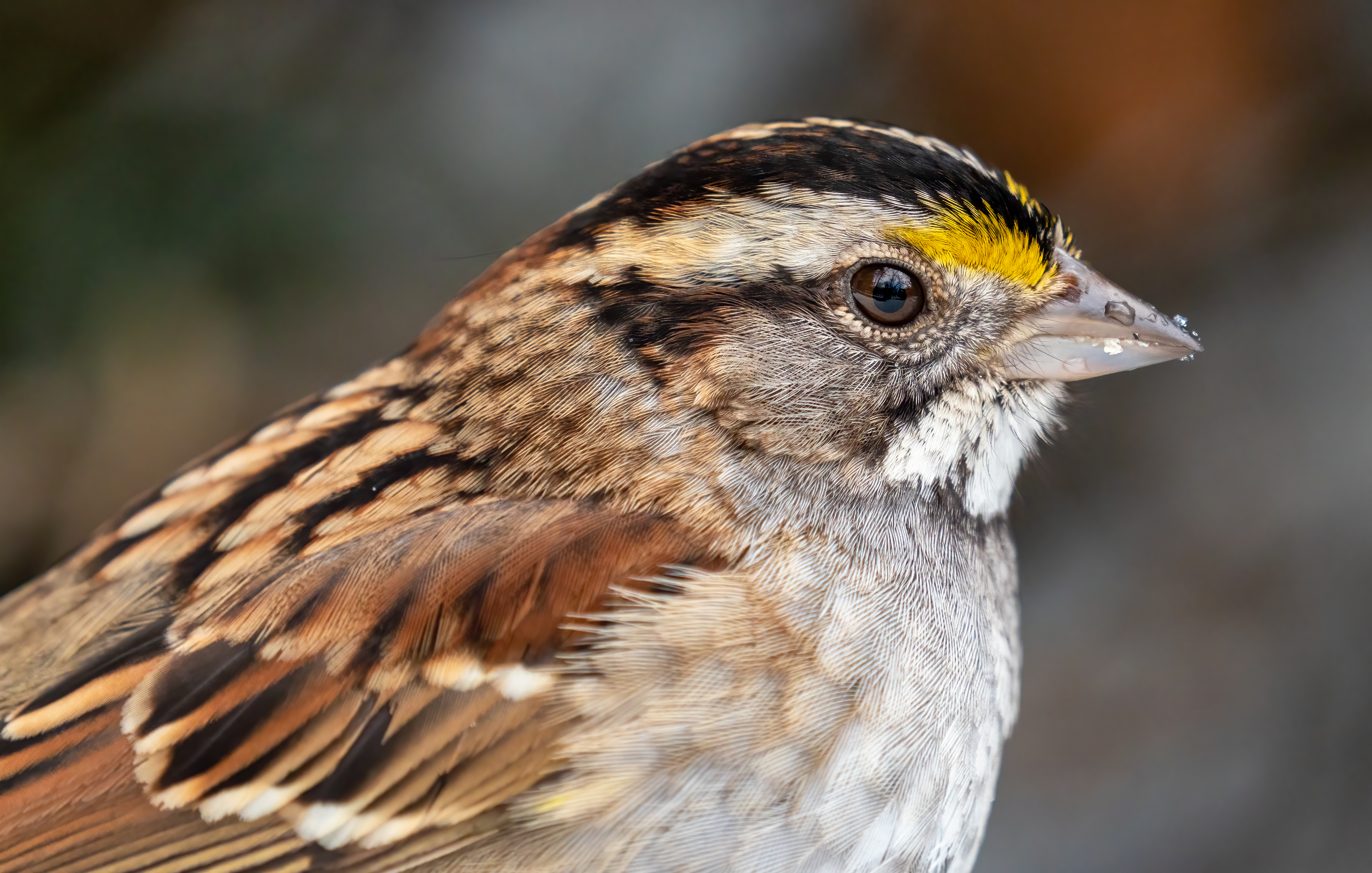
Head in profile, showing in high detail the eye, white throat, and yellow lore.

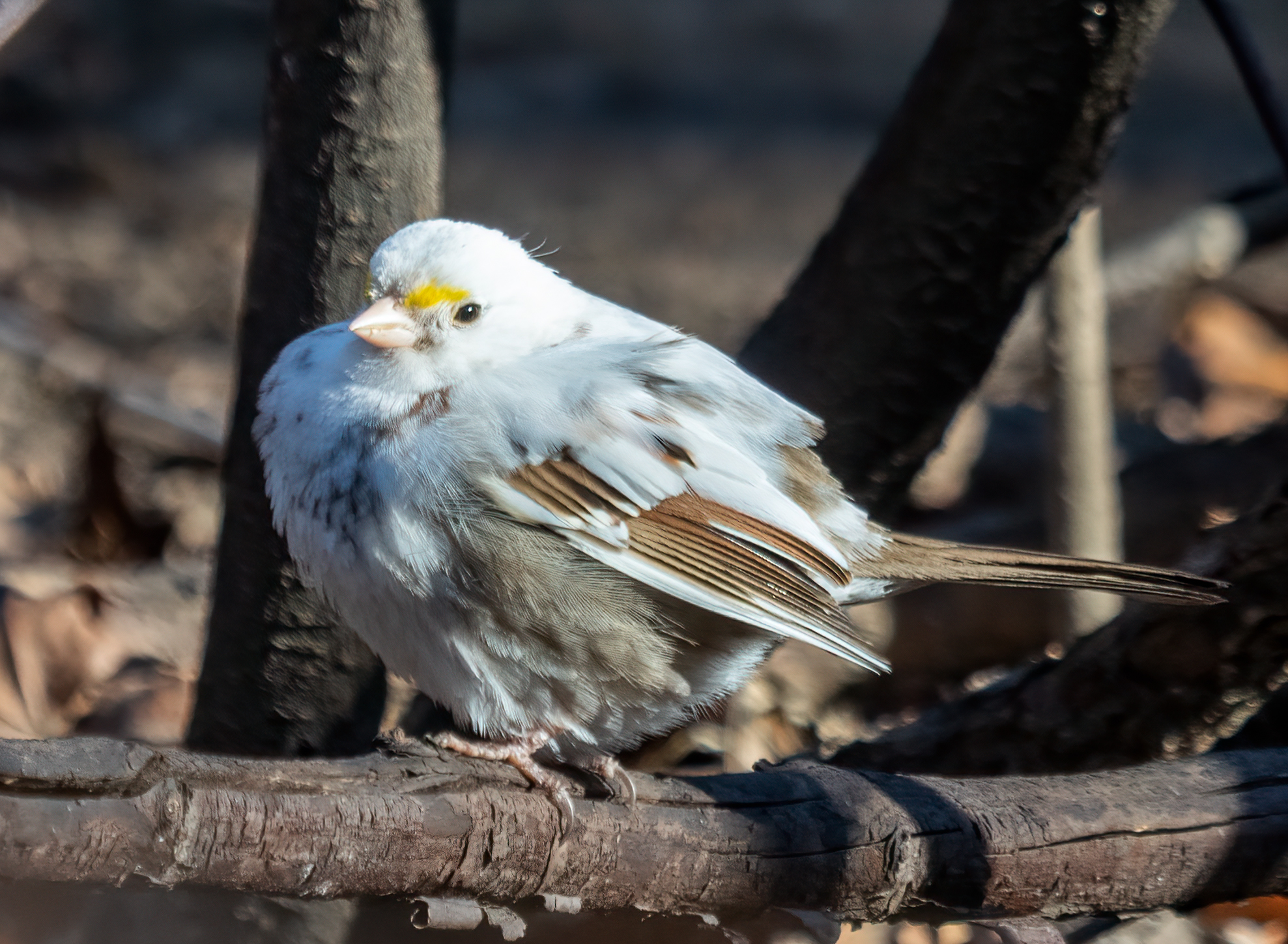
White-throated sparrow with leucism in New York.

== Behavior ==
=== Breeding ===
White-throated sparrows breed in central Canada and New England. They nest either on the ground under shrubs or low in trees in deciduous or mixed forest areas and lay three to five brown-marked blue or green-white eggs.

The tan and white morphs of white-throated sparrows use different reproductive strategies. Tan males invest in parental care and guard their mates from others searching for extra pair copulations (EPCs). White males invest in securing additional mates and EPCs through song advertisement and intruding into neighboring territory. Female morphs have similar differences, where tan females invest in parental care and white females solicit EPCs and engage in brood parasitism, leaving their eggs in another's nest to be raised and fed. Mating with the opposite morphs and using alternative reproductive strategies helps maintain competitive equilibrium. This behaviour has been described genetically to follow from the chromosomal inversion of a supergene which acts as an extra pair of sex-determining genes, resulting in four phenotypes that reproduce in a disassortative mating pattern.

=== Wintering and migration ===
In winter, this species migrates to the southern and eastern United States. They are differential migrants with females migrating farther, increasing the proportion of females at lower latitudes in the Atlantic flyway. Females are smaller so they would not perform as optimally at colder, higher latitudes, and females avoid competition with the dominant males of the winter hierarchies by migrating farther. There is also no benefit for females to be among the first to return after winter, so migrating farther allows the males to return and establish territory a few weeks before their arrival. It stays year round in the Atlantic provinces of Canada. This bird is a rare vagrant to western Europe. Alongside some other species such as the cardinal, dark-eyed junco, song sparrow and chickadees, this species ranks among the most abundant native birds during winter in eastern North America.

Despite a high level of conspecific rivalry within white-throated sparrows, this species is often dominated by other seed-eating winter residents, even those that are no larger than itself like the song sparrow, and thus may endure high levels of predation while foraging since restricted to sub-optimal sites at times by competition. Not to mention numerous mammalian carnivores, at least ten avian predators often hunt them and they are among the most regular prey species for some smaller raptors, i.e. the sharp-shinned hawk and eastern screech-owl.

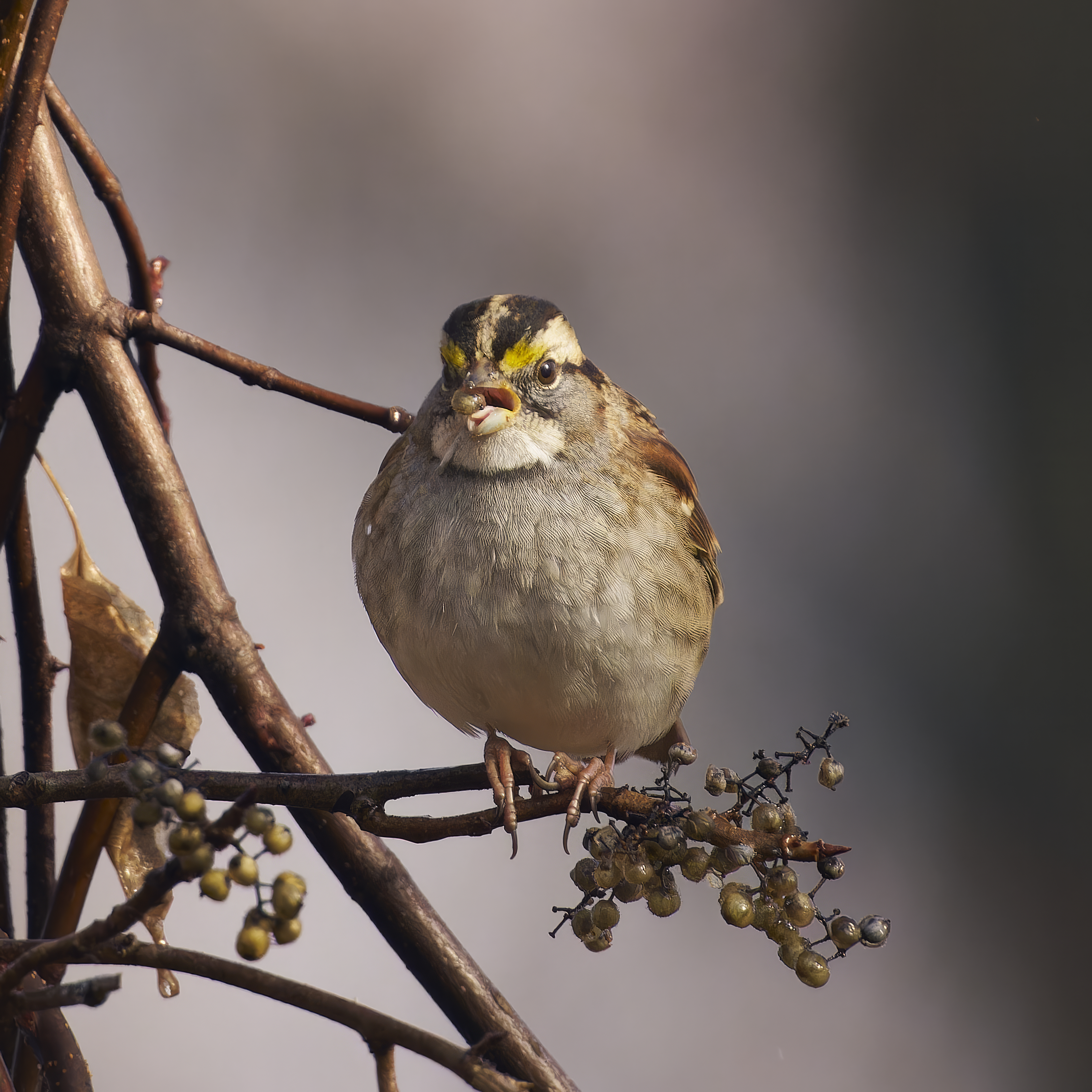
Eating poison ivy berries

=== Diet ===
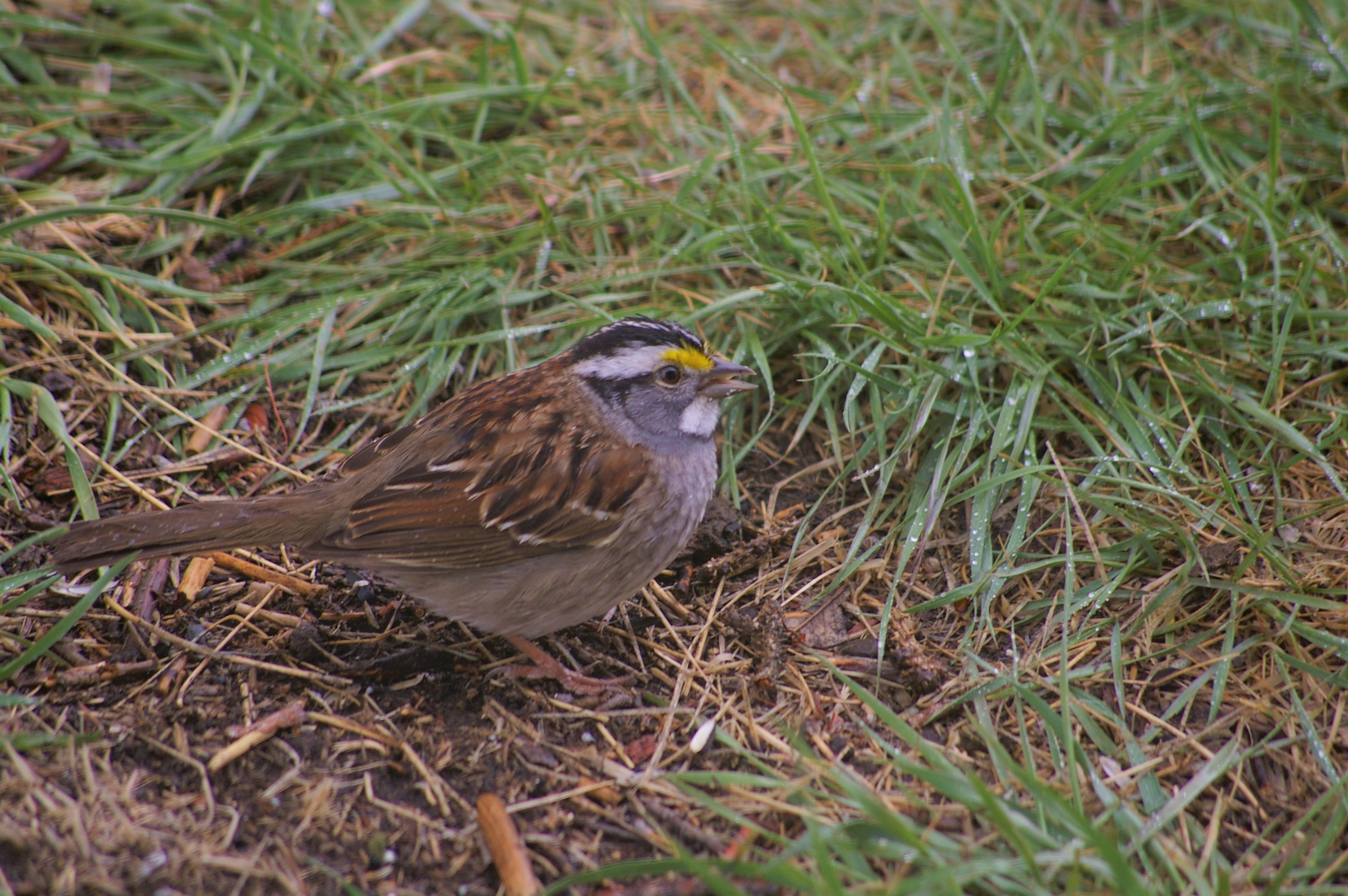
White-throated sparrows prefer to forage on the ground.

These birds forage on the ground under or near thickets or in low vegetation by kicking backward with both feet simultaneously. They mainly eat seeds, insects and berries, and are attracted to bird feeders. Blackberries, grapes, and rose hips are some fruits they eat. One of their favorite seeds is millet, but they will also feed on black oil sunflower and different seeds. During the summer, insects and other small invertebrates make up a larger portion of their diet.

== Song and calls ==
Song of the white-throated sparrow

White-throated sparrows produce song laterally through the left side of their syrinx, and control of their syrinx involves both their central and peripheral nervous systems. After damage to motor control of the left side of the syrinx, individuals were still able to produce sound but their song pattern was distorted, indicating the left side chiefly controls their production of song. There are at least two distinct songs sung by this species. One consists of an initial note, followed by three or so repeated notes at an interval of about a major third above. The second song consists of an initial note, a second a whole step lower, and a third note, repeated two or three times, about a minor third below that. This second song is commonly described by use of mnemonics with the cadence of "Po-or Sam Peabody, Peabody, Peabody" (or "O-oh sweet Canada, Canada, Canada"). The rhythm is very regular, and the timbre could be described as pinched. These musical intervals are only approximate; to a human ear the song often sounds out of tune. The repeated note will often change in pitch very slightly, contributing to this effect.

As reported by National Geographic in 2020, ornithologists have discovered a new song for the white-throated sparrow. This bird song begins in the same way as the typical song, but with a subtle difference: the repeating triplets, as in "Peabody", become doublets, as in "Cherry", ending with a final single tone. This new tune began to appear in British Columbia, Canada, and then spread east.

The white-throated sparrow also has at least two calls, in addition to its song.

== Threats ==
In a 2019 study based on monitoring efforts dating from 1978 to 2016, white-throated sparrows were found to be one of the most susceptible birds to building collisions, even being referred to as "super colliders". Whereas some common Chicago birds, such as warbling vireos (of which only two victims were found) or least flycatchers, only appeared dozens of times as fatalities, as many as 10,000 white-throated sparrows were found in the same period. This may well be caused by both their attraction to artificial light as well as their use of nocturnal flight calls, causing a positive feedback loop wherein the sparrows are constantly attracted by both light and sound to their demise.
