= Common knotweed =

Common knotweed is a common name for several plants and may refer to:

- Polygonum arenastrum
- Polygonum plebeium, native to South Asia
