= Otto Schlaginhaufen =

Swiss anthropologist (1879–1973)

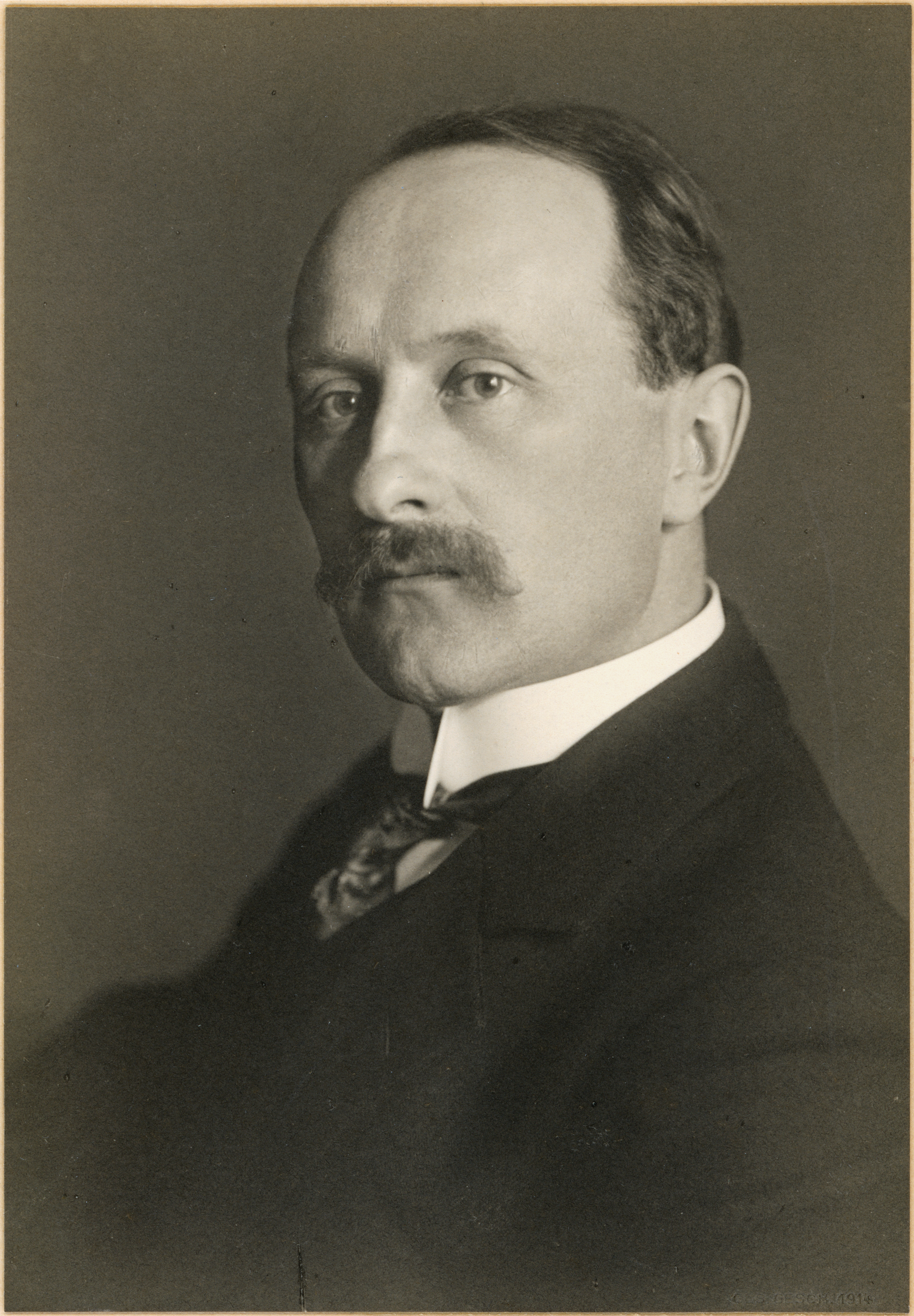
Otto Schlaginhaufen, 1914

Otto Schlaginhaufen (November 8, 1879 in St. Gallen – November 14, 1973 in Kilchberg) was a Swiss anthropologist, ethnologist and eugenicist.

== Selected works ==
- Anthropologia Helvetica: Ergebnisse anthropologischer Untersuchungen an den schweizerischen Stellungspflichtigen (in German)
  - I. Die Anthropologie der Eidgenonessenschaft (1946)
    - A. Text
    - B. Atlas
  - II. Die Anthropologie der Kantone und der natürlichen Landschaften (1959)
    - A. Text
    - B. Atlas
