= Hans Steiner =

Austrian-American professor of psychiatry

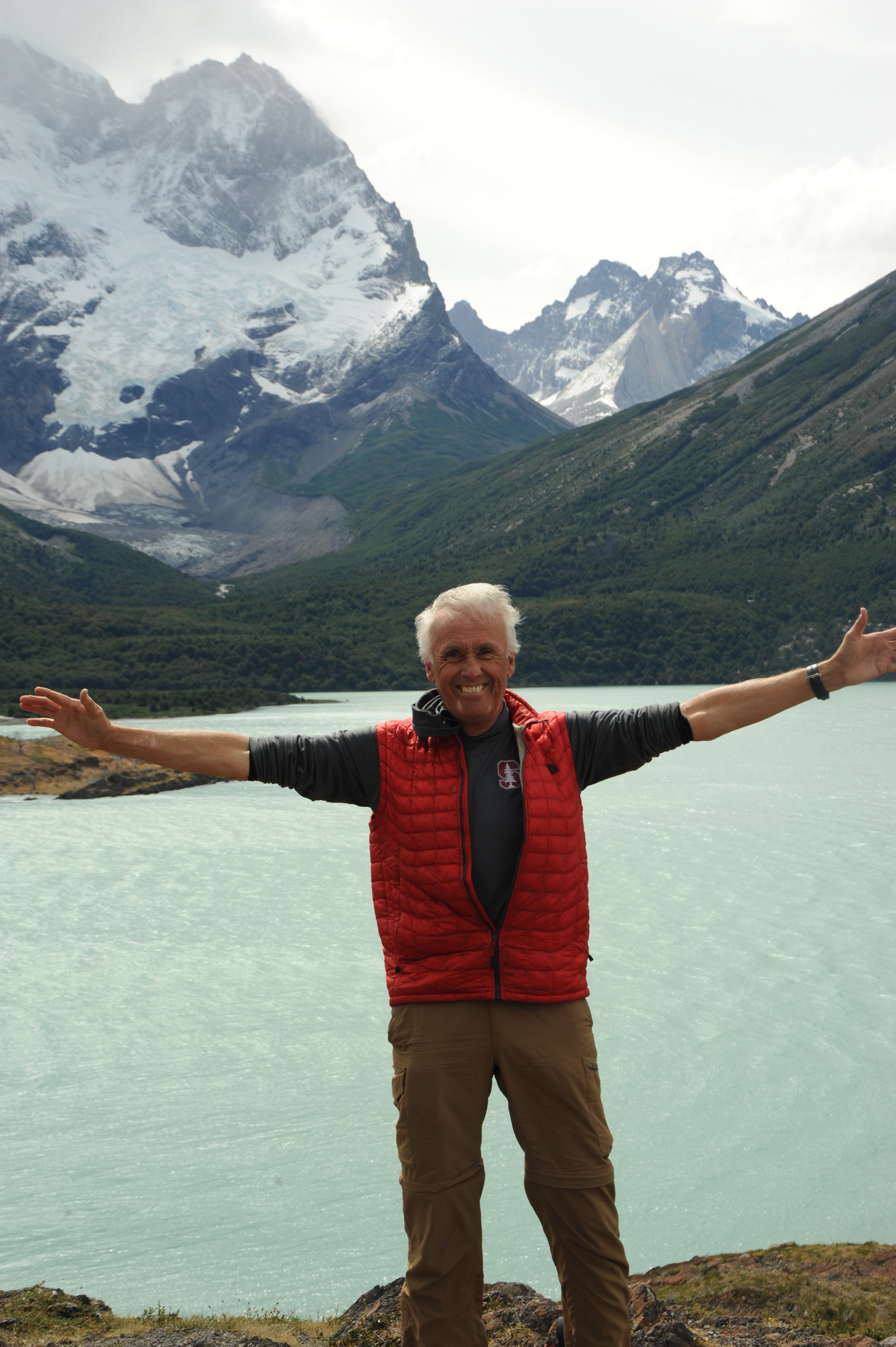
- Born: June 27, 1946; Vienna, Austria
- Died: October 17, 2022 (aged 76); Palo Alto, California, U.S.
- Education: University of Vienna (MD, 1972)

Hans Steiner (June 27, 1946 – October 17, 2022) was an Austrian-born American professor of psychiatry and behavioral sciences, child and adolescent psychiatry and human development at Stanford University, School of Medicine. In 2010 he was awarded Lifetime Distinguished Fellow by the American Psychiatric Association.

As an emeritus professor, he continued to teach and research and maintained a selective private practice in Palo Alto.

Steiner advocated the developmental psychopathology and developmental psychiatry perspective within psychiatry. He worked in the subfields of aggression, its normal and abnormal development; disruptive behavior disorders (such as conduct disorder, oppositional defiant disorder, attention-deficit hyperactivity disorder); eating disorders (anorexia nervosa, bulimia nervosa); trauma-related psychopathology (acute stress disorder, posttraumatic stress disorder, dissociative disorder, resilience); the overlap between psychiatric and other medical disorders (somatoform disorders, medical trauma); personality development across the life span, and sports psychology.

== Education ==
Steiner studied medicine at the medical faculty of the University of Vienna and was awarded the doctor medicinae universalis (Dr. med. univ.; title equivalent to M.D.) in 1972. After completing a rotating internship in internal medicine, surgery and obstetrics/gynecology at the Rudolfstiftung in Vienna, he came to the United States (1973) to complete his general psychiatry residency training at the State University of New York (SUNY), Upstate Medical Center, Syracuse, New York (1973–76). He then went on to fellowship training in child and adolescent psychiatry at the University of Michigan, Ann Arbor (1976–78), where he also was the chief resident in the years 1977–78.

== Creative writing ==
After becoming professor emeritus, Steiner returned to creative writing, producing short stories, novel, and poems. He had been active in these endeavors up to his years in medical school, writing in German at the time. His writings were in German and in English.

Steiner organized a group of physicians at Stanford who also write creatively, named the Pegasus Physicians. The group meets monthly and discusses works in progress or in the planning stage.

"Diagnosing the human condition: Stanford medical students add art, music and literature to studies" article: Diagnosing the human condition: Stanford medical students add art, music and literature to studies The Arts, Humanities & Medicine Program allows Stanford School of Medicine students to explore their artistic passions in conjunction with their medical studies.

== Death ==
Hans Steiner died in Palo Alto, California on October 17, 2022, at the age of 76.

== Bibliography ==
- Steiner, Hans. (1996): Treating Adolescents. Hoboken, NJ: Jossey-Bass. ISBN 0-7879-0206-3
- Steiner, Hans. (1997): Treating Preschool Children. Hoboken, NJ: Jossey-Bass. ISBN 0-7879-0877-0
- Steiner, Hans. (1997): Treating School-Age Children. Hoboken, NJ: Jossey-Bass. ISBN 0-7879-0878-9
- Steiner, Hans. (2004): Handbook of Mental Health Interventions in Children and Adolescents: An Integrated Developmental Approach (Editor). Hoboken, NJ: Jossey-Bass. ISBN 0-7879-6154-X
- Steiner, Hans. (2011): Fast Facts: Eating Disorders. Oxfordshire: Health Press Limited. ISBN 1-903734-91-6
- Steiner, Hans. (2011): On Becoming a Doctor, Fiction, Poetry, and Memoir (Editor). Stanford: Pegasus Physicians.
- Steiner, Hans. (2011): Handbook of Developmental Psychiatry (Editor). Hackensack: World Scientific Publishing. ISBN 981-4324-81-7

== Honors and awards ==
- Lifetime Distinguished Fellow, American Psychiatric Association (2010)
- Distinguished Fellow, American Psychiatric Association (2003)
- Fellow, American Academy of Child and Adolescent Psychiatry (1987)
- Fellow, American Academy of Psychosomatic Medicine (1990)
- Outstanding Mentor Award, American Academy of Child and Adolescent Psychiatry (1990-3, 1995–6, 1998–9, 2004)
- Dlin/Fischer Award for Significant Achievement in Clinical Research, American Academy of Psychosomatic Medicine (1990)
- Goldberger Award, American Medical Association (1996)
- One of 327 Best Mental Health Experts, Good Housekeeping (1994)
- Fellow, American Psychiatric Association (1992).
