= Hans Rudolf Schinz =

Swiss radiologist (1891–1966)

- Born: 13 December 1891; Zurich, Switzerland
- Died: 12 June 1966 (aged 74); Zurich, Switzerland
- Occupations: Radiologist; university teacher; politician
- Spouses: Dora Luise Strelin; Ginevra Rüesch
- Father: Hans Schinz

Hans Rudolf Schinz (13 December 1891 – 12 June 1966) was a Swiss radiologist. From 1918 to 1962 he headed the X-ray institute of the cantonal hospital of Zurich, and from 1947 to 1962 he was full professor of medical radiology at the University of Zurich. He gave the diagnostic and therapeutic radiology practiced in Zurich an international reputation.

== Biography ==
Hans Rudolf Schinz was born on 13 December 1891 in Zurich, the son of Hans Schinz. He was married first to Dora Luise Strelin and then to Ginevra Rüesch.

Schinz obtained his doctorate in medicine in Zurich in 1917. From 1918 to 1962 he headed the X-ray institute (Röntgeninstitut) of the cantonal hospital of Zurich (Kantonsspital Zürich). At the University of Zurich he became a Privatdozent in 1921, titular professor in 1926 and associate professor (ausserordentlicher Professor) in 1928, and he was full professor of medical radiology from 1947 to 1962.

From 1951 to 1963 Schinz was a member of the Cantonal Council of Zurich for the Free Democratic Party.

In 1928 Schinz published a widely noted textbook on X-ray diagnostics, and he gave the diagnostic and therapeutic radiology practiced in Zurich an international reputation. In 1958 the Technische Hochschule Stuttgart awarded him an honorary doctorate in natural sciences, and in 1961 the University of Tübingen an honorary doctorate in medicine. He died in Zurich on 12 June 1966.

== Bibliography ==
- H. Fritz-Niggli, "Prof. Dr. med. et Dr. rer. nat. h.c. H. R. Schinz zum 70. Geburtstag", in Fortschritte auf dem Gebiete der Röntgenstrahlen und der Nuklearmedizin, 95, 1961, no. 6
- Verhandlungen der Schweizerischen Naturforschenden Gesellschaft, 146, 1966, 271–275
