= Bibliography of the history of eugenics =

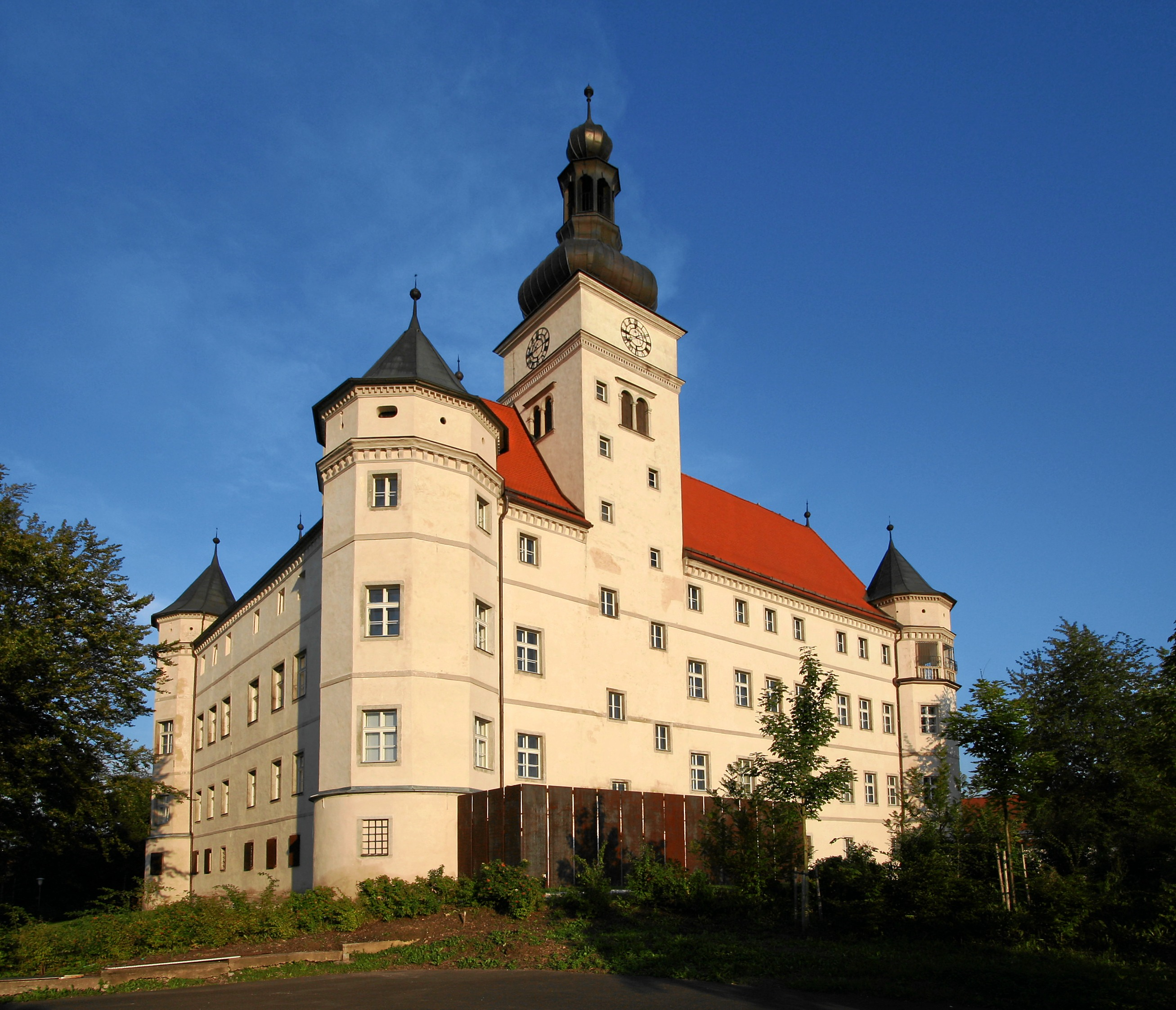
- Schloss Hartheim, a former centre for Nazi Germany's Aktion T4 campaign
- Subject: History of eugenics
- Chronological scope: Antiquity to the present
- Geographic scope: Europe, North America, Latin America, Africa, the Middle East, Asia and Australia
- Language: English-language scholarship
- Arrangement: Chronological, geographic and thematic
- Citation style: APA 7

The following is a bibliography of the history of eugenics. Works on the philosophy, ethics, science, law, culture and contemporary debates of eugenics are listed in the Bibliography of eugenics.

Eugenics (Note: /juːˈdʒɛnɪks/ yoo-JEN-iks; from Ancient Greek εύ̃ (eû) 'good, well' and -γενής (genḗs) 'born, come into being, growing/grown') is a largely discredited set of beliefs and practices that aim to improve the genetic quality of a human population. Historically, eugenicists have attempted to alter the frequency of various human phenotypes by inhibiting the fertility of those considered inferior, often through forced sterilization, or promoting that of those considered superior.

Bibliography contains academic level English language books (including translations) and journal articles, published mainly post World War II. (Note: Works published before World War II should be limited to areas where there are no significant post World War II books on the subject or when the work in question has significant historical merit. Primary sources are listed separately.) Book entries may have references to reviews published in academic journals or major newspapers when these could be considered helpful. These reference reviews also function as a resource to find other works on this subject.

Works listed here are cited in the notes or bibliographies of scholarly sources. Each is published by an academic or major trade press, written by a recognized expert, or substantially reviewed in scholarly journals; borderline cases are omitted. A selection of primary sources are included. Many of the books below carry their own bibliographies; see Further reading section for longer ones, and External links section for historical sites and museums.

Citations follow APA style. (Note: Entries are in plain text APA 7 format without templates; templates are used only for reviews and notes.) Books have citations to academic journal or mainstream published reviews when available. For books only partly about the subject, give relevant chapter or section titles where useful and available. Translators of the original-language edition are included when possible. In cases where a title or name has appeared with more than one English spelling, the most recent published form is used and a footnote documents any earlier title under which the work appeared.

== General surveys ==
- Allen, G. E. (2011). Eugenics and modern biology: Critiques of eugenics, 1910–1945. Annals of Human Genetics, 75(3), 314–325. doi:10.1111/j.1469-1809.2011.00649.x
- Bashford, A. (2010). Internationalism, cosmopolitanism, and eugenics. In A. Bashford & P. Levine (Eds.), The Oxford handbook of the history of eugenics (pp. 154–172). Oxford University Press. doi:10.1093/oxfordhb/9780195373141.013.0009
- Bashford, A., & Levine, P. (Eds.). (2010). The Oxford handbook of the history of eugenics. Oxford University Press. doi:10.1093/oxfordhb/9780195373141.001.0001
- Carlson, E. A. (2001). The unfit: A history of a bad idea. Cold Spring Harbor Laboratory Press.
- Dikötter, F. (1998). Race culture: Recent perspectives on the history of eugenics. The American Historical Review, 103(2), 467–478. doi:10.1086/ahr/103.2.467
- Gillette, A. (2007). Eugenics and the nature-nurture debate in the twentieth century. Palgrave Macmillan. doi:10.1057/9780230608900
- Kevles, D. J. (1985). In the name of eugenics: Genetics and the uses of human heredity. Alfred A. Knopf.
- Kühl, S. (2013). For the betterment of the race. Palgrave Macmillan. doi:10.1057/9781137286123
- Levine, P. (2017). Eugenics: A very short introduction. Oxford University Press. doi:10.1093/actrade/9780199385904.001.0001
- Paul, D. (1984). Eugenics and the left. Journal of the History of Ideas, 45(4), 567–590. JSTOR 2709374
- Paul, D. B. (1995). Controlling human heredity: 1865 to the present. Humanities Press.
- Paul, D. B. (1998). The politics of heredity: Essays on eugenics, biomedicine, and the nature-nurture debate. State University of New York Press.
- Roll-Hansen, N. (1988). The progress of eugenics: Growth of knowledge and change in ideology. History of Science, 26(3), 295–331. doi:10.1177/007327538802600303
- Roll-Hansen, N. (2010). Eugenics and the science of genetics. In A. Bashford & P. Levine (Eds.), The Oxford handbook of the history of eugenics (pp. 80–97). Oxford University Press. doi:10.1093/oxfordhb/9780195373141.013.0005
- Rutherford, A. (2022). Control: The dark history and troubling present of eugenics. Weidenfeld & Nicolson.

== Origins and precursors ==
- Gökyiğit, E. A. (1994). The reception of Francis Galton's Hereditary genius in the Victorian periodical press. Journal of the History of Biology, 27(2), 215–240. doi:10.1007/bf01062563
- Hawkins, M. (1997). Social Darwinism in European and American thought, 1860–1945: Nature as model and nature as threat. Cambridge University Press. doi:10.1017/cbo9780511558481
- Magnello, E. (2004). The reception of Mendelism by the biometricians and the early Mendelians (1899–1909). In M. Keynes, A. W. F. Edwards, & R. Peel (Eds.), A century of Mendelism in human genetics (pp. 19–32). CRC Press. doi:10.1201/9780203022368.ch3
- Mazumdar, P. M. H. (2002). 'Reform' eugenics and the decline of Mendelism. Trends in Genetics, 18(1), 48–52. doi:10.1016/s0168-9525(01)02551-3
- Paul, D. B. (2009). Darwin, social Darwinism and eugenics. In J. Hodge & G. Radick (Eds.), The Cambridge companion to Darwin (2nd ed., pp. 219–245). Cambridge University Press. doi:10.1017/ccol9780521884754.010
- Pick, D. (1989). Faces of degeneration: A European disorder, c. 1848–c. 1918. Cambridge University Press.
- Porter, T. M. (2018). Genetics in the madhouse: The unknown history of human heredity. Princeton University Press.
- Richards, M. (2004). Perfecting people: Selective breeding at the Oneida Community (1869–1879) and the eugenics movement. New Genetics and Society, 23(1), 47–71. doi:10.1080/1463677042000189615
- Waller, J. C. (2001). Ideas of heredity, reproduction and eugenics in Britain, 1800–1875. Studies in History and Philosophy of Science Part C: Studies in History and Philosophy of Biological and Biomedical Sciences, 32(3), 457–489. doi:10.1016/s1369-8486(00)00028-5

=== Antiquity ===
- Galton, D. J. (1998). Greek theories on eugenics. Journal of Medical Ethics, 24(4), 263–267. doi:10.1136/jme.24.4.263
- Güvercin, C. H., & Arda, B. (2008). Eugenics concept: From Plato to present. Human Reproduction & Genetic Ethics, 14(2), 20–26. doi:10.1558/hrge.v14i2.20
- Huys, M. (1996). The Spartan practice of selective infanticide and its parallels in ancient utopian tradition. Ancient Society, 27, 47–74. doi:10.2143/as.27.0.632397
- Scanlon, T. F. (2002). "Only we produce men": Spartan female athletics and eugenics. In Eros and Greek athletics (pp. 121–138). Oxford University Press. doi:10.1093/oso/9780195138894.003.0006
- Sneed, D. (2021). Disability and infanticide in ancient Greece. Hesperia, 90(4), 747–772. doi:10.2972/hesperia.90.4.0747

== By country and region ==
=== United States ===
- Allen, G. E. (1983). The misuse of biological hierarchies: The American eugenics movement, 1900–1940. History and Philosophy of the Life Sciences, 5(2), 105–128.
- Allen, G. E. (1989). Eugenics and American social history, 1880–1950. Genome, 31(2), 885–889. doi:10.1139/g89-156
- Allen, G. E. (1997). The social and economic origins of genetic determinism: A case history of the American eugenics movement, 1900–1940 and its lessons for today. Genetica, 99(2–3), 77–88. doi:10.1023/a:1018396529332
- Allen, G. E. (2013). "Culling the herd": Eugenics and the conservation movement in the United States, 1900–1940. Journal of the History of Biology, 46(1), 31–72. doi:10.1007/s10739-011-9317-1
- Bix, A. S. (1997). Experiences and voices of eugenics field-workers: 'Women's work' in biology. Social Studies of Science, 27(4), 625–668. doi:10.1177/030631297027004003
- Black, E. (2003). War against the weak: Eugenics and America's campaign to create a master race. Four Walls Eight Windows.
- Boudreau, E. B. (2005). "Yea, I have a goodly heritage": Health versus heredity in the Fitter Family Contests, 1920–1928. Journal of Family History, 30(4), 366–387. doi:10.1177/0363199005276359
- Bruinius, H. (2006). Better for all the world: The secret history of forced sterilization and America's quest for racial purity. Alfred A. Knopf.
- Cogdell, C. (2004). Eugenic design: Streamlining America in the 1930s. University of Pennsylvania Press.
- Cohen, A. (2016). Imbeciles: The Supreme Court, American eugenics, and the sterilization of Carrie Buck. Penguin Press.
- Comfort, N. (2012). The science of human perfection: How genes became the heart of American medicine. Yale University Press.
- Cooke, K. J. (1998). The limits of heredity: Nature and nurture in American eugenics before 1915. Journal of the History of Biology, 31(2), 263–278. doi:10.1023/a:1004387603971
- Crnic, M. (2009). Better babies: Social engineering for 'a better nation, a better world'. Endeavour, 33(1), 12–17. doi:10.1016/j.endeavour.2008.11.001
- Cuddy, L. A., & Roche, C. M. (Eds.). (2003). Evolution and eugenics in American literature and culture, 1880–1940: Essays on ideological conflict and complicity. Bucknell University Press.
- Currell, S., & Cogdell, C. (Eds.). (2006). Popular eugenics: National efficiency and American mass culture in the 1930s. Ohio University Press.
- Deutsch, N. (2009). Inventing America's worst family: Eugenics, Islam, and the fall and rise of the Tribe of Ishmael. University of California Press. doi:10.1525/9780520942707
- Dorr, G. M. (2008). Segregation's science: Eugenics and society in Virginia. University of Virginia Press.
- Dowbiggin, I. R. (1997). Keeping America sane: Psychiatry and eugenics in the United States and Canada, 1880–1940. Cornell University Press.
- English, D. K. (2004). Unnatural selections: Eugenics in American modernism and the Harlem Renaissance. University of North Carolina Press.
- Farber, S. A. (2008). U.S. scientists' role in the eugenics movement (1907–1939): A contemporary biologist's perspective. Zebrafish, 5(4), 243–245. doi:10.1089/zeb.2008.0576
- Gallagher, N. L. (1999). Breeding better Vermonters: The eugenics project in the Green Mountain State. University Press of New England.
- Gutiérrez, E. R. (2008). Fertile matters: The politics of Mexican-origin women's reproduction. University of Texas Press. doi:10.7560/716810
- Haller, M. H. (1963). Eugenics: Hereditarian attitudes in American thought. Rutgers University Press.
- Hansen, R., & King, D. (2013). Sterilized by the state: Eugenics, race, and the population scare in twentieth-century North America. Cambridge University Press. doi:10.1017/cbo9781139507554
- Jackson, C. (2000). Waste and whiteness: Zora Neale Hurston and the politics of eugenics. African American Review, 34(4), 639–660. JSTOR 2901423
- Kluchin, R. M. (2009). Fit to be tied: Sterilization and reproductive rights in America, 1950–1980. Rutgers University Press.
- Kuby, W. (2018). Eugenic marriage laws and the continuing crisis of out-of-state elopement. In Conjugal misconduct: Defying marriage law in the twentieth-century United States (pp. 109–145). Cambridge University Press. doi:10.1017/9781316673096.004
- Larson, E. J. (1995). Sex, race, and science: Eugenics in the Deep South. Johns Hopkins University Press.
- Lombardo, P. A. (2008). Three generations, no imbeciles: Eugenics, the Supreme Court, and Buck v. Bell. Johns Hopkins University Press.
- Luczak, E. B. (2015). Breeding and eugenics in the American literary imagination: Heredity rules in the twentieth century. Palgrave Macmillan. doi:10.1057/9781137545794
- Ludmerer, K. M. (1972). Genetics and American society: A historical appraisal. Johns Hopkins University Press.
- Micklos, D., & Carlson, E. (2000). Engineering American society: The lesson of eugenics. Nature Reviews Genetics, 1(2), 153–158. doi:10.1038/35038589
- Pernick, M. S. (1997). Eugenics and public health in American history. American Journal of Public Health, 87(11), 1767–1772. doi:10.2105/ajph.87.11.1767
- Pickens, D. K. (1968). Eugenics and the Progressives. Vanderbilt University Press.
- Rafter, N. H. (1992). Claims-making and socio-cultural context in the first U.S. eugenics campaign. Social Problems, 39(1), 17–34. doi:10.1525/sp.1992.39.1.03x0059g
- Reilly, P. R. (1991). The surgical solution: A history of involuntary sterilization in the United States. Johns Hopkins University Press.
- Roberts, D. (1997). Killing the black body: Race, reproduction, and the meaning of liberty. Pantheon Books.
- Rosen, C. (2004). Preaching eugenics: Religious leaders and the American eugenics movement. Oxford University Press. doi:10.1093/019515679x.001.0001
- Rydell, R. W. (1993). World of fairs: The Century-of-Progress expositions. University of Chicago Press.
- Schoen, J. (2005). Choice and coercion: Birth control, sterilization, and abortion in public health and welfare. University of North Carolina Press.
- Schoenl, W., & Peck, D. (2010). Advertising eugenics: Charles M. Goethe's campaign to improve the race. Endeavour, 34(2), 75–80. doi:10.1016/j.endeavour.2010.04.006
- Selden, S. (1999). Inheriting shame: The story of eugenics and racism in America. Teachers College Press.
- Smith, J. D. (1993). The eugenic assault on America: Scenes in red, white, and black. George Mason University Press.
- Stern, A. M. (2005). Eugenic nation: Faults and frontiers of better breeding in modern America. University of California Press.
- Stern, A. M. (2007). "We cannot make a silk purse out of a sow's ear": Eugenics in the Hoosier heartland. Indiana Magazine of History, 103(1).
- Wilson, P. K. (2002). Harry Laughlin's eugenic crusade to control the 'socially inadequate' in Progressive Era America. Patterns of Prejudice, 36(1), 49–67. doi:10.1080/003132202128811367
- Zuberi, T. (2025). Du Bois, demography, and eugenics. In A. D. Morris, M. Schwartz, C. Johnson-Odim, W. Allen, M. A. Hunter, K. L. Brown, & D. S. Green (Eds.), The Oxford handbook of W. E. B. Du Bois (pp. 413–432). Oxford University Press. doi:10.1093/oxfordhb/9780190062767.013.15

=== Britain ===
- Aylward, A. (2021). R.A. Fisher, eugenics, and the campaign for family allowances in interwar Britain. The British Journal for the History of Science, 54(4), 485–505. doi:10.1017/s0007087421000674
- Barker, D. (1989). The biology of stupidity: Genetics, eugenics and mental deficiency in the inter-war years. The British Journal for the History of Science, 22(3), 347–375. doi:10.1017/s0007087400026200
- Challis, D. (2013). The archaeology of race: The eugenic ideas of Francis Galton and Flinders Petrie. Bloomsbury Academic. doi:10.5040/9781472555786
- Farrall, L. A. (1985). The origins and growth of the English eugenics movement, 1865–1925. Garland Publishing.
- Freeden, M. (1979). Eugenics and progressive thought: A study in ideological affinity. The Historical Journal, 22(3), 645–671. doi:10.1017/S0018246X00017027
- Hanson, C. (2012). Eugenics, literature, and culture in post-war Britain. Routledge. doi:10.4324/9780203097915
- Jones, G. (1982). Eugenics and social policy between the wars. The Historical Journal, 25(3), 717–728. doi:10.1017/s0018246x00011882
- Jones, G. (1986). Social hygiene in twentieth century Britain. Croom Helm.
- Jones, G. (1992). Eugenics in Ireland: The Belfast Eugenics Society, 1911–15. Irish Historical Studies, 28(109), 81–95. doi:10.1017/s0021121400018599
- Magnello, M. E. (1999). The non-correlation of biometrics and eugenics: Rival forms of laboratory work in Karl Pearson's career at University College London, part 2. History of Science, 37(2), 123–150. doi:10.1177/007327539903700201
- Redvaldsen, D. (2024). A history of British eugenics since 1865: From Francis Galton to designer babies. Palgrave Macmillan. doi:10.1007/978-3-031-72290-5
- Searle, G. R. (1976). Eugenics and politics in Britain, 1900–1914. Noordhoff.
- Searle, G. R. (1979). Eugenics and politics in Britain in the 1930s. Annals of Science, 36(2), 159–169. doi:10.1080/00033797900200461
- Sheppard, K. L. (2010). Flinders Petrie and eugenics at UCL. Bulletin of the History of Archaeology, 20(1). doi:10.5334/bha.20103
- Soloway, R. A. (1990). Demography and degeneration: Eugenics and the declining birthrate in twentieth-century Britain. University of North Carolina Press.
- Stone, D. (2002). Breeding superman: Nietzsche, race and eugenics in Edwardian and interwar Britain. Liverpool University Press. doi:10.5949/upo9781846312694
- Thomson, M. (1998). The problem of mental deficiency: Eugenics, democracy, and social policy in Britain c. 1870–1959. Clarendon Press.
- Weindling, P. (2012). Julian Huxley and the continuity of eugenics in twentieth-century Britain. Journal of Modern European History, 10(4), 480–499. doi:10.17104/1611-8944_2012_4_480
- Woodhouse, J. (1982). Eugenics and the feeble-minded: The Parliamentary debates of 1912–14. History of Education, 11(2), 127–137. doi:10.1080/0046760820110205

=== Europe ===
- Cleminson, R. (2019). Anarchism and eugenics: An unlikely convergence, 1890–1940. Manchester University Press. doi:10.7765/9781526124470
- Lucassen, L. (2010). A brave new world: The left, social engineering, and eugenics in twentieth-century Europe. International Review of Social History, 55(2), 265–296. doi:10.1017/s0020859010000209
- Pols, H. (2010). Eugenics in the Netherlands and the Dutch East Indies. In A. Bashford & P. Levine (Eds.), The Oxford handbook of the history of eugenics (pp. 347–362). Oxford University Press. doi:10.1093/oxfordhb/9780195373141.013.0021
- Spektorowski, A. (2004). The eugenic temptation in socialism: Sweden, Germany, and the Soviet Union. Comparative Studies in Society and History, 46(1), 84–106. doi:10.1017/s0010417504000052
- Spektorowski, A., & Ireni-Saban, L. (2013). Politics of eugenics: Productionism, population, and national welfare. Routledge. doi:10.4324/9780203740231
- Turda, M. (2010). Modernism and eugenics. Palgrave Macmillan.

==== France ====
- Fogarty, R. S., & Osborne, M. A. (2010). Eugenics in France and the colonies. In A. Bashford & P. Levine (Eds.), The Oxford handbook of the history of eugenics (pp. 332–346). Oxford University Press. doi:10.1093/oxfordhb/9780195373141.013.0020
- Redvaldsen, D. (2025). Eugenics and natalism in France, 1912–1942: The case of the Croix-de-Feu and Parti Social Français. The European Legacy, 30(8), 947–967. doi:10.1080/10848770.2025.2558361
- Reggiani, A. H. (2002). Alexis Carrel, the unknown: Eugenics and population research under Vichy. French Historical Studies, 25(2), 331–356. doi:10.1215/00161071-25-2-331
- Rosental, P.-A. (2012). Eugenics and social security in France before and after the Vichy regime. Journal of Modern European History, 10(4), 540–562. doi:10.17104/1611-8944_2012_4_540
- Schneider, W. H. (1982). Toward the improvement of the human race: The history of eugenics in France. The Journal of Modern History, 54(2), 268–291. doi:10.1086/244134
- Schneider, W. H. (1990). Quality and quantity: The quest for biological regeneration in twentieth-century France. Cambridge University Press.
- Sonn, R. D. (2005). "Your body is yours": Anarchism, birth control, and eugenics in interwar France. Journal of the History of Sexuality, 14(4), 415–432. doi:10.1353/sex.2006.0045

==== Germany ====
- Hales, B. (2024). Cinematically transmitted disease: Eugenics and film in Weimar and Nazi Germany. Berghahn Books. doi:10.1515/9781805394815
- Herzog, D. (2024). The question of unworthy life: Eugenics and Germany's twentieth century. Princeton University Press. doi:10.1515/9780691261683
- Hong, Y.-S. (1998). From the welfare state to the racial state: Eugenics and welfare reform, 1928–1934. In Welfare, modernity, and the Weimar state, 1919–1933 (pp. 239–276). Princeton University Press. doi:10.1515/9781400864751.239
- Joseph, J., & Wetzel, N. A. (2013). Ernst Rüdin: Hitler's racial hygiene mastermind. Journal of the History of Biology, 46(1), 1–30. doi:10.1007/s10739-012-9344-6
- Usborne, C. (1992). The politics of the body in Weimar Germany: Women's reproductive rights and duties. Macmillan.
- Weindling, P. (1985). Weimar eugenics: The Kaiser Wilhelm Institute for Anthropology, Human Heredity and Eugenics in social context. Annals of Science, 42(3), 303–318. doi:10.1080/00033798500200221
- Weindling, P. (1989). Health, race and German politics between national unification and Nazism, 1870–1945. Cambridge University Press.
- Weindling, P. (2010). German eugenics and the wider world: Beyond the racial state. In A. Bashford & P. Levine (Eds.), The Oxford handbook of the history of eugenics (pp. 315–331). Oxford University Press. doi:10.1093/oxfordhb/9780195373141.013.0019
- Weiss, S. F. (1986). Wilhelm Schallmayer and the logic of German eugenics. Isis, 77(1), 33–46. doi:10.1086/354037

===== Nazi Germany =====
- Allen, G. E. (2004). Was Nazi eugenics created in the US? EMBO Reports, 5(5), 451–452. doi:10.1038/sj.embor.7400158
- Aly, G., Chroust, P., & Pross, C. (1994). Cleansing the fatherland: Nazi medicine and racial hygiene (B. Cooper, Trans.). Johns Hopkins University Press. doi:10.56021/9780801847752
- Bachrach, S. (2004). In the name of public health — Nazi racial hygiene. New England Journal of Medicine, 351(5), 417–420. doi:10.1056/nejmp048136
- Biddiss, M. (1997). Disease and dictatorship: The case of Hitler's Reich. Journal of the Royal Society of Medicine, 90(6), 342–346. doi:10.1177/014107689709000616
- Bock, G. (1983). Racism and sexism in Nazi Germany: Motherhood, compulsory sterilization, and the state. Signs: Journal of Women in Culture and Society, 8(3), 400–421. doi:10.1086/493983
- Burleigh, M., & Wippermann, W. (1991). The racial state: Germany 1933–1945. Cambridge University Press.
- Czech, H. (2007). From welfare to selection: Vienna's public health office and the implementation of racial hygiene policies under the Nazi regime. In M. Turda & P. J. Weindling (Eds.), "Blood and homeland": Eugenics and racial nationalism in Central and Southeast Europe, 1900–1940 (pp. 317–334). Central European University Press. doi:10.1515/9786155211041-017
- Czech, H. (2018). Hans Asperger, National Socialism, and "race hygiene" in Nazi-era Vienna. Molecular Autism, 9(1), Article 29. doi:10.1186/s13229-018-0208-6
- David, H. P., Fleischhacker, J., & Höhn, C. (1988). Abortion and eugenics in Nazi Germany. Population and Development Review, 14(1), 81–112. JSTOR 1972501
- Ehrenreich, E. (2007). The Nazi ancestral proof: Genealogy, racial science, and the final solution. Indiana University Press. doi:10.2979/4979.0
- Glass, J. M. (1997). Life unworthy of life: Racial phobia and mass murder in Hitler's Germany. Basic Books.
- Hart, B. W. (2012). Watching the 'eugenic experiment' unfold: The mixed views of British eugenicists toward Nazi Germany in the early 1930s. Journal of the History of Biology, 45(1), 33–63. doi:10.1007/s10739-010-9259-z
- Kühl, S. (1994). The Nazi connection: Eugenics, American racism, and German National Socialism. Oxford University Press.
- Kuntz, D., & Bachrach, S. D. (Eds.). (2004). Deadly medicine: Creating the master race. United States Holocaust Memorial Museum.
- Lifton, R. J. (1986). The Nazi doctors: Medical killing and the psychology of genocide. Basic Books.
- Müller-Hill, B. (1988). Murderous science: Elimination by scientific selection of Jews, Gypsies, and others, Germany 1933–1945 (G. R. Fraser, Trans.). Oxford University Press.
- Proctor, R. N. (1988). Racial hygiene: Medicine under the Nazis. Harvard University Press.
- Teicher, A. (2019). Why did the Nazis sterilize the blind? Genetics and the shaping of the sterilization law of 1933. Central European History, 52(2), 289–309. doi:10.1017/s000893891900030x
- Torrey, E. F., & Yolken, R. H. (2010). Psychiatric genocide: Nazi attempts to eradicate schizophrenia. Schizophrenia Bulletin, 36(1), 26–32. doi:10.1093/schbul/sbp097
- Weingart, P. (1989). German eugenics between science and politics. Osiris, 5, 260–282. doi:10.1086/368690
- Weiss, S. F. (1987). The race hygiene movement in Germany. Osiris, 3, 193–236. doi:10.1086/368666
- Weiss, S. F. (2010). The Nazi symbiosis: Human genetics and politics in the Third Reich. University of Chicago Press.
- Weiss-Wendt, A., & Yeomans, R. (Eds.). (2013). Racial science in Hitler's new Europe, 1938–1945. University of Nebraska Press. JSTOR j.ctt1ddr8dq
- Whitman, J. Q. (2017). Hitler's American model: The United States and the making of Nazi race law. Princeton University Press.

==== Southern Europe ====
- Barmpouti, A. (2019). Post-war eugenics, reproductive choices and population policies in Greece, 1950s–1980s. Springer International Publishing. doi:10.1007/978-3-030-03568-6
- Beccalossi, C. (2017). Latin eugenics and sexual knowledge in Italy, Spain, and Argentina: International networks across the Atlantic. In V. Fuechtner, D. E. Haynes, & R. M. Jones (Eds.), A global history of sexual science, 1880–1960 (pp. 305–329). University of California Press. doi:10.1525/california/9780520293373.003.0014
- Cleminson, R. (1994). Eugenics by name or by nature? The Spanish anarchist sex reform of the 1930s. History of European Ideas, 18(5), 729–740. doi:10.1016/0191-6599(94)90425-1
- Cleminson, R. (2000). Anarchism, science and sex: Eugenics in eastern Spain, 1900–1937. Peter Lang.
- Cleminson, R. (2008). Eugenics without the state: Anarchism in Catalonia, 1900–1937. Studies in History and Philosophy of Science Part C: Studies in History and Philosophy of Biological and Biomedical Sciences, 39(2), 232–239. doi:10.1016/j.shpsc.2008.03.006
- Cleminson, R. (2011). Eugenics in Portugal, 1900–1950: Setting a research agenda. East Central Europe, 38(1), 133–154. doi:10.1163/187633011x570756
- Cleminson, R. (2014). Catholicism, race and empire: Eugenics in Portugal, 1900–1950. Central European University Press. doi:10.1515/9789633860298
- Goode, J. (2009). Impurity of blood: Defining race in Spain, 1870–1930. Louisiana State University Press.
- Granel, H. A. (2023). Hygiene of reproduction, maternal culture and sexual differentiation: Eugenics in Argentina and Spain during the interwar period. Journal of Iberian and Latin American Studies, 29(1), 65–89. doi:10.1080/14701847.2023.2184008
- Nash, M. (1992). Social eugenics and nationalist race hygiene in early twentieth century Spain. History of European Ideas, 15(4–6), 741–748. doi:10.1016/0191-6599(92)90086-r
- Quine, M. S. (2010). The first-wave eugenic revolution in Southern Europe: Science sans frontières. In A. Bashford & P. Levine (Eds.), The Oxford handbook of the history of eugenics (pp. 377–397). Oxford University Press. doi:10.1093/oxfordhb/9780195373141.013.0023
- Trubeta, S. (2011). Eugenic birth control and prenuptial health certification in interwar Greece. In C. Promitzer, S. Trubeta, & M. Turda (Eds.), Health, hygiene and eugenics in Southeastern Europe to 1945 (pp. 271–298). Central European University Press. doi:10.1515/9789639776883-011

===== Fascist Italy =====
- Caglioti, A. M. (2017). Race, statistics and Italian eugenics: Alfredo Niceforo's trajectory from Lombroso to Fascism (1876–1960). European History Quarterly, 47(3), 461–489. doi:10.1177/0265691417707164
- Cassata, F. (2011). Building the new man: Eugenics, racial science and genetics in twentieth-century Italy. Central European University Press. doi:10.7829/9789639776838
- Horn, D. G. (1994). Social bodies: Science, reproduction, and Italian modernity. Princeton University Press. doi:10.1515/9781400821457
- Ipsen, C. (1996). Dictating demography: The problem of population in Fascist Italy. Cambridge University Press.
- Pozzi, L. (2020). The regulation of public morality and eugenics: A productive alliance between the Catholic Church and Italian Fascism. Modern Italy, 25(3), 317–331. doi:10.1017/mit.2020.37
- Quine, M. S. (2012). Racial "sterility" and "hyperfecundity" in Fascist Italy: Biological politics of sex and reproduction. Fascism, 1(2), 92–144. doi:10.1163/22116257-00201003

==== Scandinavia and Switzerland ====
- Björkman, M., & Widmalm, S. (2010). Selling eugenics: The case of Sweden. Notes and Records of the Royal Society, 64(4), 379–400. doi:10.1098/rsnr.2010.0009
- Broberg, G., & Roll-Hansen, N. (Eds.). (1996). Eugenics and the welfare state: Sterilization policy in Denmark, Sweden, Norway, and Finland. Michigan State University Press.
- Haave, P. (2007). Sterilization under the swastika: The case of Norway. International Journal of Mental Health, 36(1), 45–57. doi:10.2753/imh0020-7411360104
- Hemminki, E., Rasimus, A., & Forssas, E. (1997). Sterilization in Finland: From eugenics to contraception. Social Science & Medicine, 45(12), 1875–1884. doi:10.1016/s0277-9536(97)00126-3
- Mottier, V. (2008). Eugenics, politics and the state: Social democracy and the Swiss 'gardening state'. Studies in History and Philosophy of Science Part C: Studies in History and Philosophy of Biological and Biomedical Sciences, 39(2), 263–269. doi:10.1016/j.shpsc.2008.03.010
- Roll-Hansen, N. (1999). Eugenics in Scandinavia after 1945: Change of values and growth in knowledge. Scandinavian Journal of History, 24(2), 199–213. doi:10.1080/03468759950115809
- Spektorowski, A., & Mizrachi, E. (2004). Eugenics and the welfare state in Sweden: The politics of social margins and the idea of a productive society. Journal of Contemporary History, 39(3), 333–352. doi:10.1177/0022009404044443
- Tydén, M. (2010). The Scandinavian states: Reformed eugenics applied. In A. Bashford & P. Levine (Eds.), The Oxford handbook of the history of eugenics (pp. 363–376). Oxford University Press. doi:10.1093/oxfordhb/9780195373141.013.0022
- Wecker, R. (2012). Eugenics in Switzerland before and after 1945 – a continuum? Journal of Modern European History, 10(4), 519–539. doi:10.17104/1611-8944_2012_4_519

==== East-Central Europe ====
- Bucur, M. (2002). Eugenics and modernization in interwar Romania. University of Pittsburgh Press. JSTOR j.ctt5vkh6s
- Bucur, M. (2010). Eugenics in Eastern Europe, 1870s–1945. In A. Bashford & P. Levine (Eds.), The Oxford handbook of the history of eugenics (pp. 398–412). Oxford University Press. doi:10.1093/oxfordhb/9780195373141.013.0024
- Gawin, M. (2007). Progressivism and eugenic thinking in Poland, 1905–1939. In M. Turda & P. J. Weindling (Eds.), "Blood and homeland": Eugenics and racial nationalism in Central and Southeast Europe, 1900–1940 (pp. 167–184). Central European University Press. doi:10.1515/9786155211041-010
- Georgescu, T. (2011). The eugenic fortress: Alfred Csallner and the Saxon eugenic discourse in interwar Romania. In C. Promitzer, S. Trubeta, & M. Turda (Eds.), Health, hygiene and eugenics in Southeastern Europe to 1945 (pp. 351–384). Central European University Press. doi:10.1515/9789639776883-014
- Kalling, K. (2007). The self-perception of a small nation: The reception of eugenics in interwar Estonia. In M. Turda & P. J. Weindling (Eds.), "Blood and homeland": Eugenics and racial nationalism in Central and Southeast Europe, 1900–1940 (pp. 253–262). Central European University Press. doi:10.1515/9786155211041-013
- Mircheva, G. (2011). Marital health and eugenics in Bulgaria, 1878–1940. In C. Promitzer, S. Trubeta, & M. Turda (Eds.), Health, hygiene and eugenics in Southeastern Europe to 1945 (pp. 233–270). Central European University Press. doi:10.1515/9789639776883-010
- Promitzer, C. (2007). Taking care of the national body: Eugenic visions in interwar Bulgaria, 1905–1940. In M. Turda & P. J. Weindling (Eds.), "Blood and homeland": Eugenics and racial nationalism in Central and Southeast Europe, 1900–1940 (pp. 223–252). Central European University Press. doi:10.1515/9786155211041-012
- Promitzer, C., Trubeta, S., & Turda, M. (Eds.). (2011). Health, hygiene and eugenics in Southeastern Europe to 1945. Central European University Press. doi:10.1515/9789639776883
- Šimůnek, M. (2007). Eugenics, social genetics and racial hygiene: Plans for the scientific regulation of human heredity in the Czech lands, 1900–1925. In M. Turda & P. J. Weindling (Eds.), "Blood and homeland": Eugenics and racial nationalism in Central and Southeast Europe, 1900–1940 (pp. 145–166). Central European University Press. doi:10.1515/9786155211041-009
- Stauter-Halsted, K. (2016). Bio-politics between nation and empire. East Central Europe, 43(1–2), 134–160. doi:10.1163/18763308-04302006
- Turda, M., & Weindling, P. J. (Eds.). (2007). "Blood and homeland": Eugenics and racial nationalism in Central and Southeast Europe, 1900–1940. Central European University Press.
- Turda, M. (2009). The biology of war: Eugenics in Hungary, 1914–1918. Austrian History Yearbook, 40, 238–264. doi:10.1017/s0067237809000186
- Turda, M. (2014). Eugenics and nation in early 20th century Hungary. Palgrave Macmillan. doi:10.1057/9781137293534
- Turda, M. (Ed.). (2015). The history of East-Central European eugenics, 1900–1945: Sources and commentaries. Bloomsbury Academic. doi:10.5040/9781474219464
- Uzarczyk, K. (2007). "Moses als Eugeniker"? The reception of eugenic ideas in Jewish medical circles in interwar Poland. In M. Turda & P. J. Weindling (Eds.), "Blood and homeland": Eugenics and racial nationalism in Central and Southeast Europe, 1900–1940 (pp. 283–298). Central European University Press. doi:10.1515/9786155211041-015
- Yeomans, R. (2007). Of "Yugoslav barbarians" and Croatian gentlemen scholars: Nationalist ideology and racial anthropology in interwar Yugoslavia. In M. Turda & P. J. Weindling (Eds.), "Blood and homeland": Eugenics and racial nationalism in Central and Southeast Europe, 1900–1940 (pp. 83–122). Central European University Press. doi:10.1515/9786155211041-007

==== Russia and the Soviet Union ====
- Adams, M. B. (Ed.). (1990). The wellborn science: Eugenics in Germany, France, Brazil, and Russia. Oxford University Press.
- Graham, L. R. (1977). Science and values: The eugenics movement in Germany and Russia in the 1920s. The American Historical Review, 82(5), 1133–1164. doi:10.1086/ahr/82.5.1133
- Graham, L. R. (1981). Attitudes toward eugenics in Germany and Soviet Russia in the 1920s: An examination of science and values. In D. Callahan & H. T. Engelhardt (Eds.), The roots of ethics: Science, religion, and values (pp. 339–369). Springer. doi:10.1007/978-1-4613-3303-6_16
- Krementsov, N. (2006). Eugenics, Rassenhygiene, and human genetics in the late 1930s: The case of the Seventh International Genetics Congress. In S. G. Solomon (Ed.), Doing medicine together: Germany and Russia between the wars (pp. 369–404). University of Toronto Press. doi:10.3138/9781442674004-013
- Krementsov, N. (2010). Eugenics in Russia and the Soviet Union. In A. Bashford & P. Levine (Eds.), The Oxford handbook of the history of eugenics (pp. 413–429). Oxford University Press. doi:10.1093/oxfordhb/9780195373141.013.0025
- Krementsov, N. (2011). From "beastly philosophy" to medical genetics: Eugenics in Russia and the Soviet Union. Annals of Science, 68(1), 61–92. doi:10.1080/00033790.2010.527162

=== East Asia ===
- Chung, Y. J. (2002). Struggle for national survival: Eugenics in Sino-Japanese contexts, 1896–1945. Routledge.
- Chung, Y. J. (2010). Eugenics in China and Hong Kong: Nationalism and colonialism, 1890s–1940s. In A. Bashford & P. Levine (Eds.), The Oxford handbook of the history of eugenics (pp. 258–273). Oxford University Press. doi:10.1093/oxfordhb/9780195373141.013.0015
- Chung, Y. J. (2014). Better science and better race? Social Darwinism and Chinese eugenics. Isis, 105(4), 793–802. doi:10.1086/679426
- Dikötter, F. (1998). Imperfect conceptions: Medical knowledge, birth defects, and eugenics in China. Columbia University Press.
- Frühstück, S. (2003). Colonizing sex: Sexology and social control in modern Japan. University of California Press.
- Hovhannisyan, A. (2021). Preventing the birth of 'inferior offspring': Eugenic sterilizations in postwar Japan. Japan Forum, 33(3), 383–401. doi:10.1080/09555803.2020.1731570
- Nanta, A. (2024). Racial anthropology in colonial Korea: "Japanese-Korean common ancestry" vs nativism and eugenics (1916–1940). Cipango - French Journal of Japanese Studies, 8. doi:10.4000/12vjw
- Otsubo, S., & Bartholomew, J. R. (1998). Eugenics in Japan: Some ironies of modernity, 1883–1945. Science in Context, 11(3–4), 545–565. doi:10.1017/s0269889700003203
- Otsubo, S. (2005). Between two worlds: Yamanouchi Shigeo and eugenics in early twentieth-century Japan. Annals of Science, 62(2), 205–231. doi:10.1080/0003379031000091608
- Robertson, J. (2002). Blood talks: Eugenic modernity and the creation of new Japanese. History and Anthropology, 13(3), 191–216. doi:10.1080/0275720022000025547

=== India ===
- Ahluwalia, S. (2008). Reproductive restraints: Birth control in India, 1877–1947. University of Illinois Press.
- Hodges, S. (2008). Contraception, colonialism and commerce: Birth control in South India, 1920–1940. Ashgate.
- Hodges, S. (2010). South Asia's eugenic past. In A. Bashford & P. Levine (Eds.), The Oxford handbook of the history of eugenics (pp. 228–242). Oxford University Press. doi:10.1093/oxfordhb/9780195373141.013.0013
- Parmar, D., & Rao, M. (2023). Population control and eugenics: Dhanvanthi Rama Rau and Margaret Sanger in the making of India's family planning programme, 1930s–1960s. Indian Journal of Gender Studies, 30(3), 330–349. doi:10.1177/09715215231183624
- Ramusack, B. N. (1989). Embattled advocates: The debate over birth control in India, 1920–40. Journal of Women's History, 1(2), 34–64. doi:10.1353/jowh.2010.0005
- Sreenivas, M. (2021). Reproductive politics and the making of modern India. University of Washington Press.

=== Africa ===
- Campbell, C. (2007). Race and empire: Eugenics in colonial Kenya. Manchester University Press.
- Dubow, S. (1995). Scientific racism in modern South Africa. Cambridge University Press.
- Klausen, S. M. (2004). Race, maternity, and the politics of birth control in South Africa, 1910–39. Palgrave Macmillan. doi:10.1057/9780230511255

=== Middle East ===
- Alemdaroğlu, A. (2005). Politics of the body and eugenic discourse in early Republican Turkey. Body & Society, 11(3), 61–76. doi:10.1177/1357034x05056191
- El Shakry, O. (2007). The great social laboratory: Subjects of knowledge in colonial and postcolonial Egypt. Stanford University Press. doi:10.11126/stanford/9780804755672.001.0001
- Falk, R. (2010). Eugenics and the Jews. In A. Bashford & P. Levine (Eds.), The Oxford handbook of the history of eugenics (pp. 462–476). Oxford University Press. doi:10.1093/oxfordhb/9780195373141.013.0028
- Falk, R. (2017). Zionism and the biology of Jews. Springer. doi:10.1007/978-3-319-57345-8
- Langton, D. R. (2025). Zionism, evolutionary theory, and eugenics. In Darwin in the Jewish imagination: Jews' engagement with evolutionary theory (pp. 216–248). Oxford University Press. doi:10.1093/9780198967033.003.0008
- Salgirli, S. G. (2011). Eugenics for the doctors: Medicine and social control in 1930s Turkey. Journal of the History of Medicine and Allied Sciences, 66(3), 281–312. doi:10.1093/jhmas/jrq040
- Schayegh, C. (2009). Who is knowledgeable is strong: Science, class, and the formation of modern Iranian society, 1900–1950. University of California Press. doi:10.1525/9780520943544

=== Australia and New Zealand ===
- Garton, S. (1994). Sound minds and healthy bodies: Re-considering eugenics in Australia, 1914–1940. Australian Historical Studies, 26(103), 163–181. doi:10.1080/10314619408595958
- Garton, S. (2010). Eugenics in Australia and New Zealand: Laboratories of racial science. In A. Bashford & P. Levine (Eds.), The Oxford handbook of the history of eugenics (pp. 243–257). Oxford University Press. doi:10.1093/oxfordhb/9780195373141.013.0014
- McGregor, R. (2002). 'Breed out the colour' or the importance of being white. Australian Historical Studies, 33(120), 286–302. doi:10.1080/10314610208596220
- Watts, R. (1994). Beyond nature and nurture: Eugenics in twentieth century Australian history. Australian Journal of Politics & History, 40(3), 318–334. doi:10.1111/j.1467-8497.1994.tb00107.x
- Wyndham, D. (2003). Eugenics in Australia: Striving for national fitness. Galton Institute.

=== Canada ===
- Connor, J. T. H. (2019). "For her own safety and the good of society at large": Eugenics, sterilization, and Anglo-American transnationalism in Newfoundland, 1928–1934. Acadiensis, 48(1), 32–59. doi:10.1353/aca.2019.0002
- Dyck, E. (2013). Facing eugenics: Reproduction, sterilization, and the politics of choice. University of Toronto Press.
- Grekul, J., Krahn, H., & Odynak, D. (2004). Sterilizing the "feeble-minded": Eugenics in Alberta, Canada, 1929–1972. Journal of Historical Sociology, 17(4), 358–384. doi:10.1111/j.1467-6443.2004.00237.x
- Grekul, J. (2008). Sterilization in Alberta, 1928 to 1972: Gender matters. Canadian Review of Sociology, 45(3), 247–266. doi:10.1111/j.1755-618x.2008.00014.x
- McLaren, A. (1990). Our own master race: Eugenics in Canada, 1885–1945. University of Toronto Press. doi:10.3138/9781442623316
- Stahnisch, F. W. (2014). The early eugenics movement and emerging professional psychiatry: Conceptual transfers and personal relationships between Germany and North America, 1880s to 1930s. Canadian Bulletin of Medical History, 31(1), 17–40. doi:10.3138/cbmh.31.1.17
- Strange, C., & Stephen, J. A. (2010). Eugenics in Canada: A checkered history, 1850s–1990s. In A. Bashford & P. Levine (Eds.), The Oxford handbook of the history of eugenics (pp. 523–538). Oxford University Press. doi:10.1093/oxfordhb/9780195373141.013.0032
- Wahlsten, D. (1997). Leilani Muir versus the philosopher king: Eugenics on trial in Alberta. Genetica, 99(2–3), 185–198. doi:10.1007/bf02259522

=== Latin America ===
- Block, P. (2007). Institutional utopias, eugenics, and intellectual disability in Brazil. History and Anthropology, 18(2), 177–196. doi:10.1080/02757200701702851
- Briggs, L. (2002). Reproducing empire: Race, sex, science, and U.S. imperialism in Puerto Rico. University of California Press.
- dos Santos, S. A. (2002). Historical roots of the "whitening" of Brazil. Latin American Perspectives, 29(1), 61–82. doi:10.1177/0094582X0202900104
- Eraso, Y. (2007). Biotypology, endocrinology, and sterilization: The practice of eugenics in the treatment of Argentinian women during the 1930s. Bulletin of the History of Medicine, 81(4), 793–822. doi:10.1353/bhm.2007.0130
- Hochman, G., Lima, N. T., & Maio, M. C. (2010). The path of eugenics in Brazil: Dilemmas of miscegenation. In A. Bashford & P. Levine (Eds.), The Oxford handbook of the history of eugenics (pp. 493–510). Oxford University Press. doi:10.1093/oxfordhb/9780195373141.013.0030
- López, I. (2008). Matters of choice: Puerto Rican women's struggle for reproductive freedom. Rutgers University Press.
- Ramírez de Arellano, A. B., & Seipp, C. (1983). Colonialism, Catholicism, and contraception: A history of birth control in Puerto Rico. University of North Carolina Press.
- Reggiani, A. H., & Scharagrodsky, P. A. (2022). Building a disciplined and efficient body: Nationalism, eugenics, and physical culture in interwar Argentina. The International Journal of the History of Sport, 39(15), 1591–1610. doi:10.1080/09523367.2022.2161521
- Sánchez-Rivera, R. (2021). The making of "La Gran Familia Mexicana": Eugenics, gender, and sexuality in Mexico. Journal of Historical Sociology, 34(1), 161–185. doi:10.1111/johs.12308
- Schell, P. A. (2010). Eugenics policy and practice in Cuba, Puerto Rico, and Mexico. In A. Bashford & P. Levine (Eds.), The Oxford handbook of the history of eugenics (pp. 477–492). Oxford University Press. doi:10.1093/oxfordhb/9780195373141.013.0029
- Stepan, N. L. (1991). "The hour of eugenics": Race, gender, and nation in Latin America. Cornell University Press.
- Stepan, N. L. (1992). Race, gender and nation in Argentina: The influence of Italian eugenics. History of European Ideas, 15(4–6), 749–756. doi:10.1016/0191-6599(92)90087-s
- Stern, A. M. (1999). Responsible mothers and normal children: Eugenics, nationalism, and welfare in post-revolutionary Mexico, 1920–1940. Journal of Historical Sociology, 12(4), 369–397. doi:10.1111/1467-6443.00097
- Stern, A. M. (2011). "The hour of eugenics" in Veracruz, Mexico: Radical politics, public health, and Latin America's only sterilization law. Hispanic American Historical Review, 91(3), 431–443. doi:10.1215/00182168-1300191
- Stucchi-Portocarrero, S. (2018). Eugenics, medicine and psychiatry in Peru. History of Psychiatry, 29(1), 96–109. doi:10.1177/0957154x17741232
- Turda, M., & Gillette, A. (2014). Latin eugenics in comparative perspective. Bloomsbury Academic. doi:10.5040/9781474210782

=== Other regions ===
- Amrith, S. S. (2010). Eugenics in postcolonial Southeast Asia. In A. Bashford & P. Levine (Eds.), The Oxford handbook of the history of eugenics (pp. 301–314). Oxford University Press. doi:10.1093/oxfordhb/9780195373141.013.0018
- Chan, C. K. (1985). Eugenics on the rise: A report from Singapore. International Journal of Health Services, 15(4), 707–712. doi:10.2190/88fw-hnpw-exp0-3cqk
- Efron, J. M. (1994). Defenders of the race: Jewish doctors and race science in fin-de-siècle Europe. Yale University Press. doi:10.12987/9780300156805
- Krishnan, P. (2024). Audience agency in a curious instance of failed securitization: Public resistance to the Singapore government's eugenics program. Security Dialogue, 55(2), 179–196. doi:10.1177/09670106241228066
- Paul, D. B., Stenhouse, J., & Spencer, H. G. (Eds.). (2018). Eugenics at the edges of empire: New Zealand, Australia, Canada and South Africa. Springer International Publishing. doi:10.1007/978-3-319-64686-2

== Topical ==
=== Economics and the social sciences ===
- Barrett, D., & Kurzman, C. (2004). Globalizing social movement theory: The case of eugenics. Theory and Society, 33(5), 487–527. doi:10.1023/b:ryso.0000045719.45687.aa
- Leonard, T. C. (2005). Mistaking eugenics for social Darwinism: Why eugenics is missing from the history of American economics. History of Political Economy, 37(Suppl. 1), 200–233. doi:10.1215/00182702-37-suppl_1-200
- Leonard, T. C. (2005). Retrospectives: Eugenics and economics in the Progressive Era. Journal of Economic Perspectives, 19(4), 207–224. doi:10.1257/089533005775196642
- Leonard, T. C. (2016). Illiberal reformers: Race, eugenics, and American economics in the Progressive Era. Princeton University Press.
- MacKenzie, D. (1976). Eugenics in Britain. Social Studies of Science, 6(3–4), 499–532. doi:10.1177/030631277600600310
- Peart, S. J., & Levy, D. M. (2005). The "vanity of the philosopher": From equality to hierarchy in postclassical economics. University of Michigan Press.

=== Social work and eugenics ===
- Kennedy, A. C. (2008). Eugenics, "degenerate girls," and social workers during the Progressive Era. Affilia, 23(1), 22–37. doi:10.1177/0886109907310473
- O'Brien, G. (2023). Eugenics, genetics, and disability in historical and contemporary perspective: Implications for the social work profession. Oxford University Press. doi:10.1093/oso/9780197611234.001.0001
- O'Brien, G. V. (2013). Framing the moron: The social construction of feeble-mindedness in the American eugenic era. Manchester University Press. doi:10.7228/manchester/9780719087097.001.0001

=== Compulsory sterilization ===
- Amy, J.-J., & Rowlands, S. (2018). Legalised non-consensual sterilisation – eugenics put into practice before 1945, and the aftermath. Part 1: USA, Japan, Canada and Mexico. The European Journal of Contraception & Reproductive Health Care, 23(2), 121–129. doi:10.1080/13625187.2018.1450973
- Carey, A. C. (1998). Gender and compulsory sterilization programs in America: 1907–1950. Journal of Historical Sociology, 11(1), 74–105. doi:10.1111/1467-6443.00054
- Castles, K. (2002). Quiet eugenics: Sterilization in North Carolina's institutions for the mentally retarded, 1945–1965. The Journal of Southern History, 68(4), 849–878. JSTOR 3069776
- Hansen, R., & King, D. (2001). Eugenic ideas, political interests, and policy variance: Immigration and sterilization policy in Britain and the U.S. World Politics, 53(2), 237–263. doi:10.1353/wp.2001.0003
- King, D., & Hansen, R. (1999). Experts at work: State autonomy, social learning and eugenic sterilization in 1930s Britain. British Journal of Political Science, 29(1), 77–107. doi:10.1017/S0007123499000046
- Ladd-Taylor, M. (2014). Contraception or eugenics? Sterilization and "mental retardation" in the 1970s and 1980s. Canadian Bulletin of Medical History, 31(1), 189–211. doi:10.3138/cbmh.31.1.189
- Largent, M. A. (2008). Breeding contempt: The history of coerced sterilization in the United States. Rutgers University Press.
- Larson, E. J. (1991). The rhetoric of eugenics: Expert authority and the Mental Deficiency Bill. The British Journal for the History of Science, 24(1), 45–60. doi:10.1017/s0007087400028442
- Lira, N. (2022). Laboratory of deficiency: Sterilization and confinement in California, 1900–1950s. University of California Press. doi:10.1525/9780520975965
- Lombardo, P. A. (1985). Three generations, no imbeciles: New light on Buck v. Bell. New York University Law Review, 60(1), 30–62.
- Lombardo, P. A. (2023). Republicans, Democrats, & doctors: The lawmakers who wrote sterilization laws. Journal of Law, Medicine & Ethics, 51(1), 123–130. doi:10.1017/jme.2023.47
- Lombardo, P. A. (Ed.). (2011). A century of eugenics in America: From the Indiana experiment to the human genome era. Indiana University Press. doi:10.2979/5935.0
- Macnicol, J. (1989). Eugenics and the campaign for voluntary sterilization in Britain between the wars. Social History of Medicine, 2(2), 147–169. doi:10.1093/shm/2.2.147
- Macnicol, J. (1992). The voluntary sterilization campaign in Britain, 1918–39. Journal of the History of Sexuality, 2(3), 422–438.
- Novak, N. L., Lira, N., O'Connor, K. E., Harlow, S. D., Kardia, S. L. R., & Stern, A. M. (2018). Disproportionate sterilization of Latinos under California's eugenic sterilization program, 1920–1945. American Journal of Public Health, 108(5), 611–613. doi:10.2105/ajph.2018.304369
- Porter, D. (1999). Eugenics and the sterilization debate in Sweden and Britain before World War II. Scandinavian Journal of History, 24(2), 145–162. doi:10.1080/03468759950115773
- Reilly, P. R. (2015). Eugenics and involuntary sterilization: 1907–2015. Annual Review of Genomics and Human Genetics, 16(1), 351–368. doi:10.1146/annurev-genom-090314-024930
- Schoen, J. (2001). Between choice and coercion: Women and the politics of sterilization in North Carolina, 1929–1975. Journal of Women's History, 13(1), 132–156. doi:10.1353/jowh.2001.0034
- Sofair, A. N., & Kaldjian, L. C. (2000). Eugenic sterilization and a qualified Nazi analogy: The United States and Germany, 1930–1945. Annals of Internal Medicine, 132(4), 312–319. doi:10.7326/0003-4819-132-4-200002150-00010
- Stern, A. M. (2005). Sterilized in the name of public health: Race, immigration, and reproductive control in modern California. American Journal of Public Health, 95(7), 1128–1138. doi:10.2105/ajph.2004.041608
- Trombley, S. (1988). The right to reproduce. Weidenfeld & Nicolson.
- Wellerstein, A. (2011). States of eugenics: Institutions and practices of compulsory sterilization in California. In S. Jasanoff (Ed.), Reframing rights: Bioconstitutionalism in the genetic age (pp. 29–58). MIT Press. doi:10.7551/mitpress/8917.003.0004

=== Scientific racism ===
- Barkan, E. (1992). The retreat of scientific racism: Changing concepts of race in Britain and the United States between the world wars. Cambridge University Press. doi:10.1017/cbo9780511558351
- Farber, P. L. (2011). Mixing races: From scientific racism to modern evolutionary ideas. Johns Hopkins University Press. doi:10.1353/book.72067
- Ludmerer, K. M. (1972). Genetics, eugenics, and the Immigration Restriction Act of 1924. Bulletin of the History of Medicine, 46(1), 59–81.
- Maxwell, A. (2008). Picture imperfect: Photography and eugenics, 1870–1940. Sussex Academic Press.
- Mehler, B. (1989). Foundation for fascism: The new eugenics movement in the United States. Patterns of Prejudice, 23(4), 17–25. doi:10.1080/0031322x.1989.9970026
- Saini, A. (2019). Superior: The return of race science. Beacon Press.
- Schaffer, G. (2008). Racial science and British society, 1930–62. Palgrave Macmillan. doi:10.1057/9780230582446
- Stepan, N. (1982). The idea of race in science: Great Britain, 1800–1960. Macmillan. doi:10.1007/978-1-349-05452-7
- Tucker, W. H. (1994). The science and politics of racial research. University of Illinois Press.
- Yudell, M. (2014). Race unmasked: Biology and race in the twentieth century. Columbia University Press. doi:10.7312/yude16874

=== Intelligence testing and education ===
- Carson, J. (2007). The measure of merit: Talents, intelligence, and inequality in the French and American republics, 1750–1940. Princeton University Press. doi:10.1515/9780691187679
- Fancher, R. E. (1985). The intelligence men: Makers of the IQ controversy. Norton.
- Fass, P. S. (1980). The IQ: A cultural and historical framework. American Journal of Education, 88(4), 431–458. doi:10.1086/443541
- Gould, S. J. (1981). The mismeasure of man. Norton.
- Kamin, L. J. (1974). The science and politics of I.Q. Lawrence Erlbaum Associates.
- Kevles, D. J. (1968). Testing the army's intelligence: Psychologists and the military in World War I. The Journal of American History, 55(3), 565–581. doi:10.2307/1891014
- Richardson, J. T. E. (2003). Howard Andrew Knox and the origins of performance testing on Ellis Island, 1912–1916. History of Psychology, 6(2), 143–170. doi:10.1037/1093-4510.6.2.143
- Richardson, J. T. E. (2011). Howard Andrew Knox: Pioneer of intelligence testing at Ellis Island. Columbia University Press.
- Ryan, P. J. (1997). "Unnatural selection": Intelligence testing, eugenics, and American political cultures. Journal of Social History, 30(3), 669–685. doi:10.1353/jsh/30.3.669
- Wooldridge, A. (1994). Measuring the mind: Education and psychology in England, c. 1860–c. 1990. Cambridge University Press. doi:10.1017/cbo9780511659997

=== Gender and feminism ===
- Allen, A. T. (2000). Feminism and eugenics in Germany and Britain, 1900–1940: A comparative perspective. German Studies Review, 23(3), 477. JSTOR 1432830
- Devereux, C. (2006). Growing a race: Nellie L. McClung and the fiction of eugenic feminism. McGill-Queen's University Press. doi:10.1515/9780773573048
- Jones, G. (1995). Women and eugenics in Britain: The case of Mary Scharlieb, Elizabeth Sloan Chesser, and Stella Browne. Annals of Science, 52(5), 481–502. doi:10.1080/00033799500200361
- Ladd-Taylor, M. (1997). Saving babies and sterilizing mothers: Eugenics and welfare politics in the interwar United States. Social Politics: International Studies in Gender, State & Society, 4(1), 136–153. doi:10.1093/sp/4.1.136
- Love, R. (1979). "Alice in eugenics-land": Feminism and eugenics in the scientific careers of Alice Lee and Ethel Elderton. Annals of Science, 36(2), 145–158. doi:10.1080/00033797900200451
- Moss, E. L., Stam, H. J., & Kattevilder, D. (2013). From suffrage to sterilization: Eugenics and the women's movement in 20th century Alberta. Canadian Psychology, 54(2), 105–114. doi:10.1037/a0032644
- Rembis, M. A. (2011). Defining deviance: Sex, science, and delinquent girls, 1890–1960. University of Illinois Press.
- Richardson, A. (2003). Love and eugenics in the late nineteenth century: Rational reproduction and the new woman. Oxford University Press. doi:10.1093/oso/9780198187004.001.0001
- Wanhalla, A. (2007). "To better the breed of men": Women and eugenics in New Zealand, 1900–1935. Women's History Review, 16(2), 163–182. doi:10.1080/09612020601048779
- Weinbaum, A. E. (2001). Writing feminist genealogy: Charlotte Perkins Gilman, racial nationalism, and the reproduction of maternalist feminism. Feminist Studies, 27(2), 271–302. JSTOR 3178758
- Ziegler, M. (2008). Eugenic feminism: Mental hygiene, the women's movement, and the campaign for eugenic legal reform, 1900–1935. Harvard Journal of Law & Gender, 31(1), 211–235.

=== Birth control, abortion and eugenics ===
- Gordon, L. (2002). The moral property of women: A history of birth control politics in America. University of Illinois Press.
- Grossmann, A. (1995). Reforming sex: The German movement for birth control and abortion reform, 1920–1950. Oxford University Press.
- Klausen, S., & Bashford, A. (2010). Fertility control: Eugenics, neo-Malthusianism, and feminism. In A. Bashford & P. Levine (Eds.), The Oxford handbook of the history of eugenics (pp. 98–115). Oxford University Press. doi:10.1093/oxfordhb/9780195373141.013.0006
- Klausen, S. M. (2024). Thorny entanglements: Feminism, eugenics and the Abortion Law Reform Association's (ALRA) campaign for safe, accessible abortion in Britain, 1936–1967. Medical History, 68(1), 86–108. doi:10.1017/mdh.2024.4
- Löwy, I. (2018). Tangled diagnoses: Prenatal testing, women, and risk. University of Chicago Press.
- McCann, C. R. (1994). Birth control politics in the United States, 1916–1945. Cornell University Press.
- Norgren, T. (2001). Abortion before birth control: The politics of reproduction in postwar Japan. Princeton University Press.
- Siegel, R. B., & Ziegler, M. (2024). Abortion-eugenics discourse in Dobbs: A social movement history. Journal of American Constitutional History. doi:10.59015/jach.neaa6027
- Soloway, R. A. (1995). The 'perfect contraceptive': Eugenics and birth control research in Britain and America in the interwar years. Journal of Contemporary History, 30(4), 637–664. doi:10.1177/002200949503000404

=== Disability and eugenics ===
- Biesold, H. (1999). Crying hands: Eugenics and deaf people in Nazi Germany (W. Sayers, Trans.). Gallaudet University Press. (Original work published 1988)
- Carey, A. C. (2009). On the margins of citizenship: Intellectual disability and civil rights in twentieth-century America. Temple University Press.
- Elks, M. A. (2005). Visual indictment: A contextual analysis of the Kallikak family photographs. Mental Retardation, 43(4), 268–280. doi:10.1352/0047-6765(2005)43[268:viacao]2.0.co;2
- Evans, S. E. (2004). Forgotten crimes: The Holocaust and people with disabilities. Ivan R. Dee.
- Jackson, M. (2000). The borderland of imbecility: Medicine, society and the fabrication of the feeble mind in late Victorian and Edwardian England. Manchester University Press.
- Mithout, A.-L. (2024). Aoi Shiba no Kai: A disability rights movement fighting against eugenics. Cipango – French Journal of Japanese Studies, 8. doi:10.4000/12vjx
- Noll, S. (1991). Southern strategies for handling the black feeble-minded: From social control to profound indifference. Journal of Policy History, 3(2), 130–151. doi:10.1017/s0898030600004826
- Noll, S. (1995). Feeble-minded in our midst: Institutions for the mentally retarded in the South, 1900–1940. University of North Carolina Press.
- Ryan, D. F., & Schuchman, J. S. (Eds.). (2002). Deaf people in Hitler's Europe. Gallaudet University Press.
- Smith, J. D., & Wehmeyer, M. L. (2012). Good blood, bad blood: Science, nature, and the myth of the Kallikaks. American Association on Intellectual and Developmental Disabilities.
- Snyder, S. L., & Mitchell, D. T. (2006). Cultural locations of disability. University of Chicago Press. doi:10.7208/chicago/9780226767307.001.0001
- Thomson, M. (1992). Sterilization, segregation and community care: Ideology and solutions to the problem of mental deficiency in inter-war Britain. History of Psychiatry, 3(12), 473–498. doi:10.1177/0957154x9200301205
- Trent, J. W. (1994). Inventing the feeble mind: A history of mental retardation in the United States. University of California Press.

=== Eugenics and euthanasia ===
- Burleigh, M. (1994). Death and deliverance: "Euthanasia" in Germany c. 1900–1945. Cambridge University Press.
- Dowbiggin, I. (2003). A merciful end: The euthanasia movement in modern America. Oxford University Press.
- Friedlander, H. (1995). The origins of Nazi genocide: From euthanasia to the final solution. University of North Carolina Press.
- Gallagher, H. G. (1990). By trust betrayed: Patients, physicians, and the license to kill in the Third Reich (Rev. ed.). Vandamere Press.
- Joseph, J. (2005). The 1942 'euthanasia' debate in the American Journal of Psychiatry. History of Psychiatry, 16(2), 171–179. doi:10.1177/0957154x05047004
- Pernick, M. S. (1996). The black stork: Eugenics and the death of "defective" babies in American medicine and motion pictures since 1915. Oxford University Press.
- Strous, R. D. (2006). Nazi euthanasia of the mentally ill at Hadamar. American Journal of Psychiatry, 163(1), 27. doi:10.1176/appi.ajp.163.1.27
- von Cranach, M. (2003). The killing of psychiatric patients in Nazi Germany between 1939–1945. The Israel Journal of Psychiatry and Related Sciences, 40(1), 8–18.

=== Religion and eugenics ===
- Baker, G. J. (2014). Christianity and eugenics: The place of religion in the British Eugenics Education Society and the American Eugenics Society, c.1907–1940. Social History of Medicine, 27(2), 281–302. doi:10.1093/shm/hku008
- Burleigh, M. (1994). Between enthusiasm, compliance and protest: The churches, eugenics and the Nazi 'euthanasia' programme. Contemporary European History, 3(3), 253–264. doi:10.1017/s0960777300000886
- Durst, D. L. (2017). Eugenics and Protestant social reform: Hereditary science and religion in America, 1860–1940. Pickwick Publications.
- Gutierrez, C. (2018). Unnatural selection: Eugenics and the spirit world. Studies in Religion/Sciences Religieuses, 47(2), 263–279. doi:10.1177/0008429818758981
- Merricks, P. T. (2012). "God and the gene": E. W. Barnes on eugenics and religion. Politics, Religion & Ideology, 13(3), 353–374. doi:10.1080/21567689.2012.698978
- Nelson, R. H. (2016). Prohibition and eugenics: Implicit religions that failed. Implicit Religion, 19(2), 307–335. doi:10.1558/imre.v19i3.30841
- Rosen, C. (2004). Preaching eugenics: Religious leaders and the American eugenics movement. Oxford University Press. doi:10.1093/019515679x.001.0001
- Slattery, J. P. (2024). Reconsidering eugenics in science and religion scholarship: A reflection and invitation. Zygon: Journal of Religion and Science, 59(2). doi:10.16995/zygon.17110
- Stuart, J. R. (2016). "Our religion is not hostile to real science": Evolution, eugenics, and race/religion-making in Mormonism's first century. Journal of Mormon History, 42(1), 1–43. doi:10.5406/jmormhist.42.1.0001

==== Catholic Church and eugenics ====
- Betta, E. (2018). From biopolitics to eugenics: The encyclical Casti connubii. The Journal of Religious History, Literature and Culture, 4(2), 39–59. doi:10.16922/jrhlc.4.2.3
- Campos, R. (2016). Authoritarianism and punitive eugenics: Racial hygiene and national Catholicism during Francoism, 1936–1945. História, Ciências, Saúde-Manguinhos, 23(Suppl. 1), 131–148. doi:10.1590/s0104-59702016000500008
- Dietrich, D. J. (1992). Catholic eugenics in Germany, 1920–1945: Hermann Muckermann, S.J. and Joseph Mayer. Journal of Church and State, 34(3), 575–600. doi:10.1093/jcs/34.3.575
- Holme, I. (2018). Spiritual eugenics as part of the Irish carceral archipelago. Journal of Historical Sociology, 31(2), 154–164. doi:10.1111/johs.12166
- Leon, S. M. (2004). "Hopelessly entangled in Nordic pre-suppositions": Catholic participation in the American Eugenics Society in the 1920s. Journal of the History of Medicine and Allied Sciences, 59(1), 3–49. doi:10.1093/jhmas/jrg041
- Leon, S. M. (2013). An image of God: The Catholic struggle with eugenics. University of Chicago Press. doi:10.7208/chicago/9780226039039.001.0001
- Lepicard, E. (1998). Eugenics and Roman Catholicism: An encyclical letter in context: Casti connubii, December 31, 1930. Science in Context, 11(3–4), 527–544. doi:10.1017/s0269889700003197
- Löscher, M. (2007). Eugenics and Catholicism in interwar Austria. In M. Turda & P. J. Weindling (Eds.), "Blood and homeland": Eugenics and racial nationalism in Central and Southeast Europe, 1900–1940 (pp. 299–316). Central European University Press. doi:10.1515/9786155211041-016
- Normandin, S. (1998). Eugenics, McGill, and the Catholic Church in Montreal and Quebec: 1890–1942. Canadian Bulletin of Medical History, 15(1), 59–86. doi:10.3138/cbmh.15.1.59
- Walsh, S. (2022). The religion of life: Eugenics, race, and Catholicism in Chile. University of Pittsburgh Press. JSTOR j.ctv262qrqx

=== Biographies of eugenicists ===
- Bulmer, M. (2003). Francis Galton: Pioneer of heredity and biometry. Johns Hopkins University Press.
- Chapman, P. D. (1988). Schools as sorters: Lewis M. Terman, applied psychology, and the intelligence testing movement, 1890–1930. New York University Press.
- Chesler, E. (1992). Woman of valor: Margaret Sanger and the birth control movement in America. Simon & Schuster.
- Gillham, N. W. (2001). A life of Sir Francis Galton: From African exploration to the birth of eugenics. Oxford University Press.
- Krementsov, N. (2018). With and without Galton: Vasilii Florinskii and the fate of eugenics in Russia. Open Book Publishers. doi:10.11647/obp.0144
- Porter, T. M. (2004). Karl Pearson: The scientific life in a statistical age. Princeton University Press.
- Reggiani, A. H. (2007). God's eugenicist: Alexis Carrel and the sociobiology of decline. Berghahn Books. doi:10.1515/9781800733985
- Schmidt, U. (2007). Karl Brandt: The Nazi doctor. Medicine and power in the Third Reich. Hambledon Continuum.
- Spiro, J. P. (2009). Defending the master race: Conservation, eugenics, and the legacy of Madison Grant. University of Vermont Press.
- Weiss, S. F. (1987). Race hygiene and national efficiency: The eugenics of Wilhelm Schallmayer. University of California Press. doi:10.1525/9780520336605
- Witkowski, J. A., & Inglis, J. R. (Eds.). (2008). Davenport's dream: 21st century reflections on heredity and eugenics. Cold Spring Harbor Laboratory Press.
- Zenderland, L. (1998). Measuring minds: Henry Herbert Goddard and the origins of American intelligence testing. Cambridge University Press.

=== Institutions, organizations and funding ===
- Allen, G. E. (1986). The Eugenics Record Office at Cold Spring Harbor, 1910–1940: An essay in institutional history. Osiris, 2, 225–264. doi:10.1086/368657
- Lombardo, P. A. (2002). "The American breed": Nazi eugenics and the origins of the Pioneer Fund. Albany Law Review, 65(3), 743–830.
- Mazumdar, P. M. H. (1992). Eugenics, human genetics and human failings: The Eugenics Society, its sources and its critics in Britain. Routledge.
- Osborn, F. (1974). History of the American Eugenics Society. Social Biology, 21(2), 115–126. doi:10.1080/19485565.1974.9988099
- Schmuhl, H.-W. (2008). The Kaiser Wilhelm Institute for Anthropology, Human Heredity, and Eugenics, 1927–1945: Crossing boundaries. Springer. doi:10.1007/978-1-4020-6600-9
- Tucker, W. H. (2002). The funding of scientific racism: Wickliffe Draper and the Pioneer Fund. University of Illinois Press.

=== Positive eugenics and pronatalism ===
- Davin, A. (1978). Imperialism and motherhood. History Workshop Journal, 5(1), 9–66. doi:10.1093/hwj/5.1.9
- Lovett, L. L. (2007). Conceiving the future: Pronatalism, reproduction, and the family in the United States, 1890–1938. University of North Carolina Press. doi:10.5149/9780807868102_lovett
- Lovett, L. L. (2007). "Fitter families for future firesides": Florence Sherbon and popular eugenics. The Public Historian, 29(3), 69–85. doi:10.1525/tph.2007.29.3.69
- Pernick, M. S. (2002). Taking better baby contests seriously. American Journal of Public Health, 92(5), 707–708. doi:10.2105/ajph.92.5.707
- Selden, S. (2005). Transforming better babies into fitter families: Archival resources and the history of the American eugenics movement, 1908–1930. Proceedings of the American Philosophical Society, 149(2), 199–225.
- Stern, A. M. (2002). Making better babies: Public health and race betterment in Indiana, 1920–1935. American Journal of Public Health, 92(5), 742–752. doi:10.2105/ajph.92.5.742

=== Population control ===
- Bashford, A. (2014). Global population: History, geopolitics, and life on Earth. Columbia University Press. doi:10.7312/bash14766
- Connelly, M. (2006). To inherit the Earth: Imagining world population, from the yellow peril to the population bomb. Journal of Global History, 1(3), 299–319. doi:10.1017/s1740022806003019
- Connelly, M. (2008). Fatal misconception: The struggle to control world population. Belknap Press of Harvard University Press. doi:10.4159/9780674029835
- Greenhalgh, S. (2005). Missile science, population science: The origins of China's one-child policy. The China Quarterly, 182, 253–276. doi:10.1017/s0305741005000184
- Greenhalgh, S. (2008). Just one child: Science and policy in Deng's China. University of California Press.
- Hvistendahl, M. (2011). Unnatural selection: Choosing boys over girls, and the consequences of a world full of men. PublicAffairs.
- Ramsden, E. (2008). Eugenics from the New Deal to the Great Society: Genetics, demography and population quality. Studies in History and Philosophy of Science Part C: Studies in History and Philosophy of Biological and Biomedical Sciences, 39(4), 391–406. doi:10.1016/j.shpsc.2008.09.005

=== Immigration and eugenics ===
- Baynton, D. C. (2016). Defectives in the land: Disability and immigration in the age of eugenics. University of Chicago Press. doi:10.7208/chicago/9780226364339.001.0001
- Higham, J. (1955). Strangers in the land: Patterns of American nativism, 1860–1925. Rutgers University Press.
- King, D. (2000). Making Americans: Immigration, race, and the origins of the diverse democracy. Harvard University Press. doi:10.4159/9780674039629
- Molina, N. (2006). Fit to be citizens? Public health and race in Los Angeles, 1879–1939. University of California Press.
- Okrent, D. (2019). The guarded gate: Bigotry, eugenics, and the law that kept two generations of Jews, Italians, and other European immigrants out of America. Scribner.
- Zeidel, R. F. (2004). Immigrants, progressives, and exclusion politics: The Dillingham Commission, 1900–1927. Northern Illinois University Press.

=== Indigenous peoples and eugenics ===
- Lawrence, J. (2000). The Indian Health Service and the sterilization of Native American women. The American Indian Quarterly, 24(3), 400–419. doi:10.1353/aiq.2000.0008
- Leason, J. (2021). Forced and coerced sterilization of Indigenous women: Strengths to build upon. Canadian Family Physician, 67(7), 525–527. doi:10.46747/cfp.6707525
- O'Sullivan, M. D. (2016). Informing Red Power and transforming the second wave: Native American women and the struggle against coerced sterilization in the 1970s. Women's History Review, 25(6), 965–982. doi:10.1080/09612025.2015.1083229
- Stote, K. (2015). An act of genocide: Colonialism and the sterilization of Aboriginal women. Fernwood Publishing.
- Stote, K. (2022). From eugenics to family planning: The coerced sterilization of Indigenous women in post-1970 Saskatchewan. Native American and Indigenous Studies, 9(1), 102–132. doi:10.1353/nai.2022.0013
- Torpy, S. J. (2000). Native American women and coerced sterilization: On the Trail of Tears in the 1970s. American Indian Culture and Research Journal, 24(2), 1–22. doi:10.17953/aicr.24.2.7646013460646042

=== Crime, poverty and the "unfit" ===
- Ladd-Taylor, M. (2017). Fixing the poor: Eugenic sterilization and child welfare in the twentieth century. Johns Hopkins University Press.
- Ladd-Taylor, M. (2019). "Ravished by some moron": The eugenic origins of the Minnesota Psychopathic Personality Act of 1939. Journal of Policy History, 31(2), 192–216. doi:10.1017/s0898030619000022
- Nourse, V. F. (2008). In reckless hands: Skinner v. Oklahoma and the near triumph of American eugenics. W. W. Norton.
- Rafter, N. (2008). The criminal brain: Understanding biological theories of crime. New York University Press.
- Rafter, N. H. (1997). Creating born criminals. University of Illinois Press.
- Rafter, N. H. (Ed.). (1988). White trash: The eugenic family studies, 1877–1919. Northeastern University Press.

=== Sexuality and eugenics ===
- Carter, J. B. (2007). The heart of whiteness: Normal sexuality and race in America, 1880–1940. Duke University Press.
- Dunne, P. (2017). Transgender sterilisation requirements in Europe. Medical Law Review, 25(4), 554–581. doi:10.1093/medlaw/fwx028
- Kline, W. (2001). Building a better race: Gender, sexuality, and eugenics from the turn of the century to the baby boom. University of California Press.
- Ordover, N. (2003). American eugenics: Race, queer anatomy, and the science of nationalism. University of Minnesota Press.
- Somerville, S. B. (2000). Queering the color line: Race and the invention of homosexuality in American culture. Duke University Press.
- Terry, J. (1999). An American obsession: Science, medicine, and homosexuality in modern society. University of Chicago Press.

=== Postwar trials and reckoning ===
- Annas, G. J., & Grodin, M. A. (Eds.). (1992). The Nazi doctors and the Nuremberg Code. Oxford University Press.
- Schmidt, U. (2004). Justice at Nuremberg: Leo Alexander and the Nazi doctors' trial. Palgrave Macmillan.
- Weindling, P. J. (2004). Nazi medicine and the Nuremberg trials: From medical war crimes to informed consent. Palgrave Macmillan.

=== Legacies and memory ===
- Bashford, A. (2010). Epilogue: Where did eugenics go?. In A. Bashford & P. Levine (Eds.), The Oxford handbook of the history of eugenics (pp. 539–558). Oxford University Press. doi:10.1093/oxfordhb/9780195373141.013.0033
- Burke, C. S., & Castaneda, C. J. (2007). The public and private history of eugenics: An introduction. The Public Historian, 29(3), 5–17. doi:10.1525/tph.2007.29.3.5
- Cowan, R. S. (2008). Heredity and hope: The case for genetic screening. Harvard University Press. doi:10.4159/9780674029927
- Duster, T. (1990). Backdoor to eugenics. Routledge.
- Garver, K. L., & Garver, B. (1991). Eugenics: Past, present, and the future. American Journal of Human Genetics, 49(5), 1109–1118.
- Kevles, D. J. (1999). Eugenics and human rights. BMJ, 319(7207), 435–438. doi:10.1136/bmj.319.7207.435
- Koch, L. (2004). The meaning of eugenics: Reflections on the government of genetic knowledge in the past and the present. Science in Context, 17(3), 315–331. doi:10.1017/s0269889704000158
- Löwy, I. (2017). Imperfect pregnancies: A history of birth defects and prenatal diagnosis. Johns Hopkins University Press.
- Malacrida, C. (2015). A special hell: Institutional life in Alberta's eugenic years. University of Toronto Press.
- Paul, D. B., & Spencer, H. G. (1995). The hidden science of eugenics. Nature, 374(6520), 302–304. doi:10.1038/374302a0
- Stern, A. M. (2012). Telling genes: The story of genetic counseling in America. Johns Hopkins University Press. doi:10.1353/book.72083
- Stern, A. M., Novak, N. L., Lira, N., O'Connor, K., Harlow, S., & Kardia, S. (2017). California's sterilization survivors: An estimate and call for redress. American Journal of Public Health, 107(1), 50–54. doi:10.2105/ajph.2016.303489
- Turda, M. (2022). Legacies of eugenics: Confronting the past, forging a future. Ethnic and Racial Studies, 45(13), 2470–2477. doi:10.1080/01419870.2022.2095222

== Primary sources ==
Works by eugenicists and their contemporaries, and collections of such writings. For later edited collections of sources see also Rafter (1988) under Disability and eugenics and Turda (2015) under East-Central Europe.

- Baur, E., Fischer, E., & Lenz, F. (1931). Human heredity (E. Paul & C. Paul, Trans.). George Allen & Unwin. (Original work published 1927)
- Binding, K., & Hoche, A. (1992). Permitting the destruction of unworthy life: Its extent and form. Issues in Law & Medicine, 8(2), 231–265. (Original work published 1920)
- Buck v. Bell, 274 U.S. 200 (1927).
- Brigham, C. C. (1923). A study of American intelligence. Princeton University Press.
- Carrel, A. (1935). Man, the unknown. Harper & Brothers.
- Chesterton, G. K. (1922). Eugenics and other evils. Cassell.
- Darwin, L. (1915). Alcoholism and eugenics. British Journal of Inebriety, 13(2), 55–66. doi:10.1111/j.1360-0443.1915.tb04543.x
- Davenport, C. B. (1911). Heredity in relation to eugenics. Henry Holt.
- Dugdale, R. L. (1877). "The Jukes": A study in crime, pauperism, disease and heredity. G. P. Putnam's Sons.
- Fisher, R. A. (1930). The genetical theory of natural selection. Clarendon Press.
- Galton, F. (1865). Hereditary talent and character. Macmillan's Magazine, 12, 157–166, 318–327.
- Galton, F. (1869). Hereditary genius: An inquiry into its laws and consequences. Macmillan.
- Galton, F. (1883). Inquiries into human faculty and its development. Macmillan.
- Galton, F. (1904). Eugenics: Its definition, scope, and aims. American Journal of Sociology, 10(1), 1–25. doi:10.1086/211280
- Gerrard, T. J. (1912). The Church and eugenics. P. S. King.
- Gini, C. (1927). The scientific basis of fascism. Political Science Quarterly, 42(1), 99–115. JSTOR 2142862
- Goddard, H. H. (1912). The Kallikak family: A study in the heredity of feeble-mindedness. Macmillan.
- Grant, M. (1916). The passing of the great race: Or, the racial basis of European history. Charles Scribner's Sons.
- Haldane, J. B. S. (1938). Heredity and politics. George Allen & Unwin.
- Huxley, J. S. (1936). Eugenics and society. The Eugenics Review, 28(1), 11–31.
- Jensen, A. R. (1969). How much can we boost IQ and scholastic achievement? Harvard Educational Review, 39(1), 1–123. doi:10.17763/haer.39.1.l3u15956627424k7
- Jordan, D. S. (1902). The blood of the nation: A study of the decay of races through the survival of the unfit. American Unitarian Association.
- Laughlin, H. H. (1914). Report of the Committee to Study and to Report on the Best Practical Means of Cutting Off the Defective Germ-Plasm in the American Population: The scope of the committee's work (Eugenics Record Office Bulletin No. 10A). Eugenics Record Office.
- Laughlin, H. H. (1922). Eugenical sterilization in the United States. Psychopathic Laboratory of the Municipal Court of Chicago.
- Lundborg, H., & Runnström, J. (1921). The Swedish nation in word and picture. Hasse W. Tullberg.
- Mazumdar, P. (Ed.). (2006). The eugenics movement: An international perspective (Vols. 1–6). Routledge.
- Muller, H. J. (1935). Out of the night: A biologist's view of the future. Vanguard Press.
- Osborn, F. (1940). Preface to eugenics. Harper & Brothers.
- Pearson, K. (1901). National life from the standpoint of science. Adam and Charles Black.
- Pius XI. (1930). Casti connubii [Encyclical letter on Christian marriage].
- Popenoe, P., & Johnson, R. H. (1918). Applied eugenics. Macmillan.
- Relf v. Weinberger, 372 F. Supp. 1196 (D.D.C. 1974).
- Saleeby, C. W. (1909). Alcoholism and eugenics. British Journal of Inebriety, 7(1), 7–20. doi:10.1111/j.1360-0443.1909.tb04688.x
- Saleeby, C. W. (1909). Parenthood and race culture: An outline of eugenics. Moffat, Yard.
- Sanger, M. (1922). The pivot of civilization. Brentano's.
- Skinner v. Oklahoma ex rel. Williamson, 316 U.S. 535 (1942).
- Stoddard, L. (1920). The rising tide of color against white world-supremacy. Charles Scribner's Sons.

== Journals ==
=== Eugenics journals ===
- Annals of Eugenics (1925–1953). Continued as Annals of Human Genetics. ISSN 2050-1420
- Biometrika (1901–). ISSN 0006-3444
- Eugenical News (1916–1953). Succeeded by Eugenics Quarterly.
- Eugenics Quarterly (1954–1968). Continued as Social Biology (1969–) and Biodemography and Social Biology. ISSN 0097-2762
- The Eugenics Review (1909–1968). Journal of the Eugenics Education Society, later the Eugenics Society; the run is freely available through PubMed Central.

=== Journals publishing on the history of eugenics ===
- Annals of Science. ISSN 0003-3790
- Biodemography and Social Biology. ISSN 1948-5565
- Bulletin of the History of Medicine. ISSN 1086-3176
- Disability Studies Quarterly. ISSN 1041-5718
- History of the Human Sciences. ISSN 0952-6951
- Isis. ISSN 0021-1753
- Journal of Heredity. ISSN 0022-1503
- Journal of the History of Biology. ISSN 0022-5010
- Journal of the History of Medicine and Allied Sciences. ISSN 0022-5045
- Journal of the History of the Behavioral Sciences. ISSN 0022-5061
- Medical History. ISSN 0025-7273
- Science in Context. ISSN 0269-8897
- Social History of Medicine. ISSN 0951-631X
- Studies in History and Philosophy of Biological and Biomedical Sciences (1998–2020). ISSN 1369-8486
- The British Journal for the History of Science. ISSN 0007-0874

== Reference works and bibliographies ==
- English, D. K. (2016). Eugenics. In Oxford bibliographies in African American studies. Oxford University Press. doi:10.1093/obo/9780190280024-0029
- Engs, R. C. (2005). The eugenics movement: An encyclopedia. Greenwood Press. doi:10.5040/9798400647994
- Farrall, L. A. (1979). The history of eugenics: A bibliographical review. Annals of Science, 36(2), 111–123. doi:10.1080/00033797900200431
- Holmes, S. J. (1924). A bibliography of eugenics. University of California Press.
- Ladd-Taylor, M. (2025). Eugenics. In Oxford bibliographies in history of medicine. Oxford University Press. doi:10.1093/obo/9780197768723-0011
- Sheehy, K. (2013). Eugenics. In Oxford bibliographies in childhood studies. Oxford University Press. doi:10.1093/obo/9780199791231-0110
- Wilson, R. A. (2017). Eugenics and philosophy. In Oxford bibliographies in philosophy. Oxford University Press. doi:10.1093/obo/9780195396577-0350

== See also ==
- Aktion T4
- Bibliography of eugenics
- Buck v. Bell
- Compulsory sterilization
- Eugenic feminism
- Eugenics
- Eugenics in the United States
- Eugenics Record Office
- Francis Galton
- History of eugenics
- Nazi eugenics
- Racial hygiene
- Scientific racism
- Social Darwinism
