= Bibliography of eugenics =

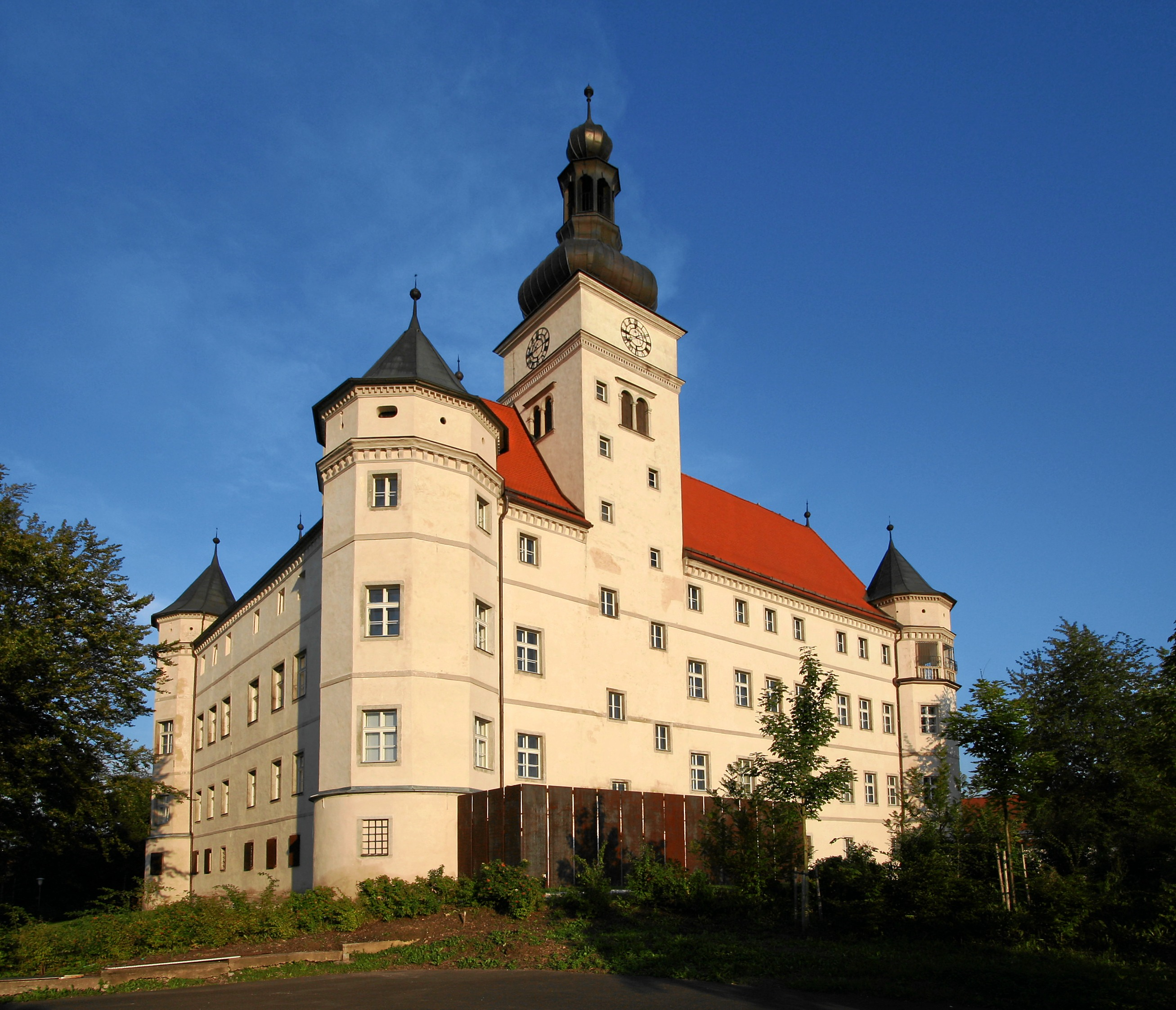
- Schloss Hartheim, a former centre for Nazi Germany's Aktion T4 campaign
- Subject: Eugenics
- Chronological scope: 20th century to the present
- Geographic scope: International
- Language: English-language scholarship
- Arrangement: Thematic
- Citation style: APA 7

The following is a bibliography of eugenics. It covers scholarship on the ethics, science, law, culture and contemporary debates of eugenics. Historical works are listed in the Bibliography of the history of eugenics.

Eugenics (Note: /juːˈdʒɛnɪks/ yoo-JEN-iks; from Ancient Greek εύ̃ (eû) 'good, well' and -γενής (genḗs) 'born, come into being, growing/grown') is a largely discredited set of beliefs and practices that aim to improve the genetic quality of a human population. Historically, eugenicists have attempted to alter the frequency of various human phenotypes by inhibiting the fertility of those considered inferior, often through forced sterilization, or promoting that of those considered superior.

Bibliography contains academic level English language books (including translations) and journal articles, published mainly post World War II. (Note: Works published before World War II should be limited to areas where there are no significant post World War II books on the subject or when the work in question has significant historical merit. Primary sources are listed separately.) Book entries may have references to reviews published in academic journals or major newspapers when these could be considered helpful. These reference reviews also function as a resource to find other works on this subject.

Works listed here are cited in the notes or bibliographies of scholarly sources. Each is published by an academic or major trade press, written by a recognized expert, or substantially reviewed in scholarly journals; borderline cases are omitted. A selection of primary sources are included. Many of the books below carry their own bibliographies; see Further reading section for longer ones, and External links section for historical sites and museums.

Citations follow APA style. (Note: Entries are in plain text APA 7 format without templates; templates are used only for reviews and notes.) Books have citations to academic journal or mainstream published reviews when available. For books only partly about the subject, give relevant chapter or section titles where useful and available. Translators of the original-language edition are included when possible. In cases where a title or name has appeared with more than one English spelling, the most recent published form is used and a footnote documents any earlier title under which the work appeared.

== History ==
Historical scholarship, primary sources from the eugenics movement and works on its legacies are listed in the Bibliography of the history of eugenics.

== Topical ==
=== Philosophy and eugenics ===
- Agar, N. (2004). Liberal eugenics: In defence of human enhancement. Blackwell. doi:10.1002/9780470775004
- Buchanan, A., Brock, D. W., Daniels, N., & Wikler, D. (2000). From chance to choice: Genetics and justice. Cambridge University Press. doi:10.1017/cbo9780511806940
- Habermas, J. (2003). The future of human nature (H. Beister, M. Pensky, & W. Rehg, Trans.). Polity.
- Hasian, M. A., Jr. (1996). The rhetoric of eugenics in Anglo-American thought. University of Georgia Press.
- Kitcher, P. (1996). The lives to come: The genetic revolution and human possibilities. Simon & Schuster.
- Rose, N. (2007). The politics of life itself: Biomedicine, power, and subjectivity in the twenty-first century. Princeton University Press. doi:10.1515/9781400827503
- Sandel, M. J. (2007). The case against perfection: Ethics in the age of genetic engineering. Belknap Press of Harvard University Press. doi:10.4159/9780674043060
- Savulescu, J. (2001). Procreative beneficence: Why we should select the best children. Bioethics, 15(5–6), 413–426. doi:10.1111/1467-8519.00251
- Weikart, R. (2004). From Darwin to Hitler: Evolutionary ethics, eugenics, and racism in Germany. Palgrave Macmillan. doi:10.1007/978-1-137-10986-6
- Wikler, D. (1999). Can we learn from eugenics? Journal of Medical Ethics, 25(2), 183–194. doi:10.1136/jme.25.2.183
- Wilson, R. A. (2018). The eugenic mind project. MIT Press. doi:10.7551/mitpress/11284.001.0001

=== Eugenics and ethics ===
- Anomaly, J. (2018). Defending eugenics: From cryptic choice to conscious selection. Monash Bioethics Review, 35(1–4), 24–35. doi:10.1007/s40592-018-0081-2
- Asch, A. (1999). Prenatal diagnosis and selective abortion: A challenge to practice and policy. American Journal of Public Health, 89(11), 1649–1657. doi:10.2105/ajph.89.11.1649
- Bayertz, K. (1994). GenEthics: Technological intervention in human reproduction as a philosophical problem (S. L. Kirkby, Trans.). Cambridge University Press. (Original work published 1987)
- Buchanan, A. (2011). Beyond humanity? The ethics of biomedical enhancement. Oxford University Press. doi:10.1093/acprof:oso/9780199587810.001.0001
- Caplan, A. L., McGee, G., & Magnus, D. (1999). What is immoral about eugenics? BMJ, 319(7220), 1284. doi:10.1136/bmj.319.7220.1284
- Daar, J. (2017). The new eugenics: Selective breeding in an era of reproductive technologies. Yale University Press. doi:10.12987/yale/9780300137156.001.0001
- de Melo-Martín, I. (2004). On our obligation to select the best children: A reply to Savulescu. Bioethics, 18(1), 72–83. doi:10.1111/j.1467-8519.2004.00379.x
- Fletcher, J. (1974). The ethics of genetic control: Ending reproductive roulette. Anchor Press.
- Fukuyama, F. (2002). Our posthuman future: Consequences of the biotechnology revolution. Farrar, Straus and Giroux.
- Garland-Thomson, R. (2012). The case for conserving disability. Journal of Bioethical Inquiry, 9(3), 339–355. doi:10.1007/s11673-012-9380-0
- Glover, J. (1984). What sort of people should there be? Penguin.
- Glover, J. (2006). Choosing children: Genes, disability, and design. Oxford University Press. doi:10.1093/acprof:oso/9780199290925.001.0001
- Gyngell, C., & Douglas, T. (2015). Stocking the genetic supermarket: Reproductive genetic technologies and collective action problems. Bioethics, 29(4), 241–250. doi:10.1111/bioe.12098
- Harris, J. (2007). Enhancing evolution: The ethical case for making better people. Princeton University Press. doi:10.1515/9781400836383
- Hubbard, R., & Wald, E. (1993). Exploding the gene myth: How genetic information is produced and manipulated by scientists, physicians, employers, insurance companies, educators, and law enforcers. Beacon Press.
- Kerr, A., & Shakespeare, T. (2002). Genetic politics: From eugenics to genome. New Clarion Press.
- King, D. S. (1999). Preimplantation genetic diagnosis and the 'new' eugenics. Journal of Medical Ethics, 25(2), 176–182. doi:10.1136/jme.25.2.176
- Lippman, A. (1991). Prenatal genetic testing and screening: Constructing needs and reinforcing inequities. American Journal of Law & Medicine, 17(1–2), 15–50. doi:10.1017/s0098858800007917
- Parens, E., & Asch, A. (Eds.). (2000). Prenatal testing and disability rights. Georgetown University Press.
- Ramsey, P. (1970). Fabricated man: The ethics of genetic control. Yale University Press.
- Roberts, D. E. (2009). Race, gender, and genetic technologies: A new reproductive dystopia? Signs: Journal of Women in Culture and Society, 34(4), 783–804. doi:10.1086/597132
- Rothman, B. K. (1986). The tentative pregnancy: Prenatal diagnosis and the future of motherhood. Viking.
- Savulescu, J., & Kahane, G. (2009). The moral obligation to create children with the best chance of the best life. Bioethics, 23(5), 274–290. doi:10.1111/j.1467-8519.2008.00687.x
- Selgelid, M. J. (2014). Moderate eugenics and human enhancement. Medicine, Health Care and Philosophy, 17(1), 3–12. doi:10.1007/s11019-013-9485-1
- Shakespeare, T. (1998). Choices and rights: Eugenics, genetics and disability equality. Disability & Society, 13(5), 665–681. doi:10.1080/09687599826452
- Sparrow, R. (2011). A not-so-new eugenics: Harris and Savulescu on human enhancement. Hastings Center Report, 41(1), 32–42. doi:10.1002/j.1552-146x.2011.tb00098.x
- Veit, W., Anomaly, J., Agar, N., Singer, P., Fleischman, D. S., & Minerva, F. (2021). Can 'eugenics' be defended? Monash Bioethics Review, 39(1), 60–67. doi:10.1007/s40592-021-00129-1
- Wilkinson, S. (2010). Choosing tomorrow's children: The ethics of selective reproduction. Oxford University Press. doi:10.1093/acprof:oso/9780199273966.001.0001

=== Genetics, genome editing and eugenics ===
- Baylis, F. (2019). Altered inheritance: CRISPR and the ethics of human genome editing. Harvard University Press.
- Greely, H. T. (2016). The end of sex and the future of human reproduction. Harvard University Press.
- Greely, H. T. (2021). CRISPR people: The science and ethics of editing humans. MIT Press.
- Harden, K. P. (2021). The genetic lottery: Why DNA matters for social equality. Princeton University Press.
- Karavani, E., Zuk, O., Zeevi, D., Barzilai, N., Stefanis, N. C., Hatzimanolis, A., Smyrnis, N., Avramopoulos, D., Kruglyak, L., Atzmon, G., Lam, M., Lencz, T., & Carmi, S. (2019). Screening human embryos for polygenic traits has limited utility. Cell, 179(6), 1424–1435.e8. doi:10.1016/j.cell.2019.10.033
- Lander, E. S., Baylis, F., Zhang, F., Charpentier, E., Berg, P., Bourgain, C., Friedrich, B., Joung, J. K., Li, J., Liu, D., Naldini, L., Nie, J.-B., Qiu, R., Schoene-Seifert, B., Shao, F., Terry, S., Wei, W., & Winnacker, E.-L. (2019). Adopt a moratorium on heritable genome editing. Nature, 567(7747), 165–168. doi:10.1038/d41586-019-00726-5
- Lázaro-Muñoz, G., Pereira, S., Carmi, S., & Lencz, T. (2021). Screening embryos for polygenic conditions and traits: Ethical considerations for an emerging technology. Genetics in Medicine, 23(3), 432–434. doi:10.1038/s41436-020-01019-3
- Lewontin, R. C., Rose, S., & Kamin, L. J. (1984). Not in our genes: Biology, ideology, and human nature. Pantheon Books.
- National Academies of Sciences, Engineering, and Medicine. (2017). Human genome editing: Science, ethics, and governance. The National Academies Press. doi:10.17226/24623
- Panofsky, A. (2014). Misbehaving science: Controversy and the development of behavior genetics. University of Chicago Press.
- Turley, P., Meyer, M. N., Wang, N., Cesarini, D., Hammonds, E., Martin, A. R., Neale, B. M., Rehm, H. L., Wilkins-Haug, L., Benjamin, D. J., Hyman, S., Laibson, D., & Visscher, P. M. (2021). Problems with using polygenic scores to select embryos. New England Journal of Medicine, 385(1), 78–86. doi:10.1056/nejmsr2105065

=== Reproductive technologies and screening ===
- Hashiloni-Dolev, Y. (2007). A life (un)worthy of living: Reproductive genetics in Israel and Germany. Springer. doi:10.1007/1-4020-5218-9
- Kaposy, C. (2018). Choosing Down syndrome: Ethics and new prenatal testing technologies. MIT Press. doi:10.7551/mitpress/11556.001.0001
- Paul, D. B., & Brosco, J. P. (2013). The PKU paradox: A short history of a genetic disease. Johns Hopkins University Press.
- Plotz, D. (2005). The genius factory: The curious history of the Nobel Prize sperm bank. Random House.
- Raz, A. E. (2009). Community genetics and genetic alliances: Eugenics, carrier testing, and networks of risk. Routledge. doi:10.4324/9780203877401
- Thomas, G. M. (2017). Down's syndrome screening and reproductive politics: Care, choice, and disability in the prenatal clinic. Routledge. doi:10.4324/9781315660806
- Tober, D. (2019). Romancing the sperm: Shifting biopolitics and the making of modern families. Rutgers University Press. doi:10.36019/9780813590820

=== Law, policy and human rights ===
- Albert, G. (2021). Compensation for forced sterilization in the Czech Republic: Reporting the results of Romani women's activism. European Yearbook of Minority Issues, 20(1), 248–262. doi:10.1163/22116117-02001011
- Chaparro-Buitrago, J. (2025). Decolonizing reproductive rights in Latin America: The cases of forced sterilization in Peru. Bristol University Press. doi:10.46692/9781529236071
- Ghandakly, E. C., & Fabi, R. (2021). Sterilization in US Immigration and Customs Enforcement's (ICE's) detention: Ethical failures and systemic injustice. American Journal of Public Health, 111(5), 832–834. doi:10.2105/ajph.2021.306186
- Kendall, T., & Albert, C. (2015). Experiences of coercion to sterilize and forced sterilization among women living with HIV in Latin America. Journal of the International AIDS Society, 18(1), Article 19462. doi:10.7448/ias.18.1.19462
- Morita, K. (2001). The eugenic transition of 1996 in Japan: From law to personal choice. Disability & Society, 16(5), 765–771. doi:10.1080/09687590120070114
- Patel, P. (2017). Forced sterilization of women as discrimination. Public Health Reviews, 38(1), Article 15. doi:10.1186/s40985-017-0060-9
- Tsuji, Y. (2018). Forced sterilization and abortion in Japan: Family and constitution. Bratislava Law Review, 2(2), 50–63. doi:10.46282/blr.2018.2.2.118
- Zampas, C., & Lamačková, A. (2011). Forced and coerced sterilization of women in Europe. International Journal of Gynecology & Obstetrics, 114(2), 163–166. doi:10.1016/j.ijgo.2011.05.002
- Zenz, A. (2021). 'End the dominance of the Uyghur ethnic group': An analysis of Beijing's population optimization strategy in southern Xinjiang. Central Asian Survey, 40(3), 291–312. doi:10.1080/02634937.2021.1946483

=== Eugenics in culture and media ===
- Childs, D. J. (2001). Modernism and eugenics: Woolf, Eliot, Yeats, and the culture of degeneration. Cambridge University Press.
- Doyle, L. (1994). Bordering on the body: The racial matrix of modern fiction and culture. Oxford University Press.
- Kirby, D. A. (2000). The new eugenics in cinema: Genetic determinism and gene therapy in GATTACA. Science Fiction Studies, 27(2), 193–215. doi:10.1525/sfs.27.2.0193
- Kirby, D. A. (2004). Extrapolating race in GATTACA: Genetic passing, identity, and the science of race. Literature and Medicine, 23(1), 184–200. doi:10.1353/lm.2004.0006
- Kirby, D. A. (2007). The devil in our DNA: A brief history of eugenics in science fiction films. Literature and Medicine, 26(1), 83–108. doi:10.1353/lm.2008.0006
- Seitler, D. (2008). Atavistic tendencies: The culture of science in American modernity. University of Minnesota Press.
- Woiak, J. (2007). Designing a brave new world: Eugenics, politics, and fiction. The Public Historian, 29(3), 105–129. doi:10.1525/tph.2007.29.3.105

=== Contemporary debates ===
- Bostrom, N. (2003). Human genetic enhancements: A transhumanist perspective. The Journal of Value Inquiry, 37(4), 493–506. doi:10.1023/b:inqu.0000019037.67783.d5
- Fischer, C. S., Hout, M., Sánchez Jankowski, M., Lucas, S. R., Swidler, A., & Voss, K. (1996). Inequality by design: Cracking the bell curve myth. Princeton University Press.
- Fraser, S. (Ed.). (1995). The bell curve wars. Basic Books.
- Gillborn, D. (2016). Softly, softly: Genetics, intelligence and the hidden racism of the new geneism. Journal of Education Policy, 31(4), 365–388. doi:10.1080/02680939.2016.1139189
- Herrnstein, R. J., & Murray, C. (1994). The bell curve: Intelligence and class structure in American life. Free Press.
- Panofsky, A., Dasgupta, K., & Iturriaga, N. (2021). How White nationalists mobilize genetics: From genetic ancestry and human biodiversity to counterscience and metapolitics. American Journal of Physical Anthropology, 175(2), 387–398. doi:10.1002/ajpa.24150
- Rapp, R. (1999). Testing women, testing the fetus: The social impact of amniocentesis in America. Routledge.
- Roberts, D. (2011). Fatal invention: How science, politics, and big business re-create race in the twenty-first century. The New Press.
- Rutherford, A. (2021). Race, eugenics, and the canceling of great scientists. American Journal of Physical Anthropology, 175(2), 448–452. doi:10.1002/ajpa.24192
- Rutherford, A. (2024). Eugenics and the misuse of Mendel. The American Journal of Human Genetics, 111(7), 1254–1257. doi:10.1016/j.ajhg.2024.05.013
- Savulescu, J., & Bostrom, N. (Eds.). (2009). Human enhancement. Oxford University Press. doi:10.1093/oso/9780199299720.001.0001

== Primary sources ==
Treaties, declarations and policy documents. For historical primary sources see the Bibliography of the history of eugenics.

- Council of Europe. (1997). Convention for the protection of human rights and dignity of the human being with regard to the application of biology and medicine: Convention on human rights and biomedicine (ETS No. 164).
- Nuffield Council on Bioethics. (2018). Genome editing and human reproduction: Social and ethical issues.
- UNESCO. (1997). Universal declaration on the human genome and human rights.
- United Nations. (2006). Convention on the rights of persons with disabilities (A/RES/61/106).
- World Health Organization. (2014). Eliminating forced, coercive and otherwise involuntary sterilization.

== Journals ==
=== Journals publishing on bioethics ===
- Bioethics. ISSN 0269-9702
- Hastings Center Report. ISSN 0093-0334
- Journal of Medical Ethics. ISSN 0306-6800
- New Genetics and Society. ISSN 1463-6778

== Reference works ==
- Engs, R. C. (2005). The eugenics movement: An encyclopedia. Greenwood Press. doi:10.5040/9798400647994

== See also ==
- Bibliography of the history of eugenics
- Compulsory sterilization
- Designer baby
- Dysgenics
- Eugenics
- History of eugenics
- Human genetic enhancement
- Liberal eugenics
- New eugenics
- Preimplantation genetic diagnosis
- Scientific racism
- Transhumanism
