= Eugenics in Minnesota =

In Minnesota, developmentally disabled people, most of whom were women, were involuntarily committed to state guardianship and sterilized, By current standards, many of those who were either committed to state guardianship or sterilized would not be considered disabled. Eugenic ideals were popular in the state during much of the early to mid 20th century.

Minnesota was the 17th state in the United States that enacted laws which legalized eugenic practices. The practice of eugenics aims to improve the genetic quality of a population which has historically occurred through selective breeding, forced sterilization, and genocide.

== Background ==
In 1917, under pressure from Minnesota's Child Welfare Commission, 35 new laws were passed that related to children in the state, called the Children's Code. These laws gave the state the authority to involuntarily commit children who were "feebleminded", dependent, neglected, or "delinquent" to state guardianship. County probate judges were given the ability to commit any "feebleminded", "inebriate", or "insane" person without the consent of parents, guardians, or nearest kin. This policy was shaped by Arthur C. Rogers, superintendent of the Minnesota School for the Feebleminded in Faribault, who supported compulsory commitment in the state. He also pushed for forced sterilization in Minnesota.

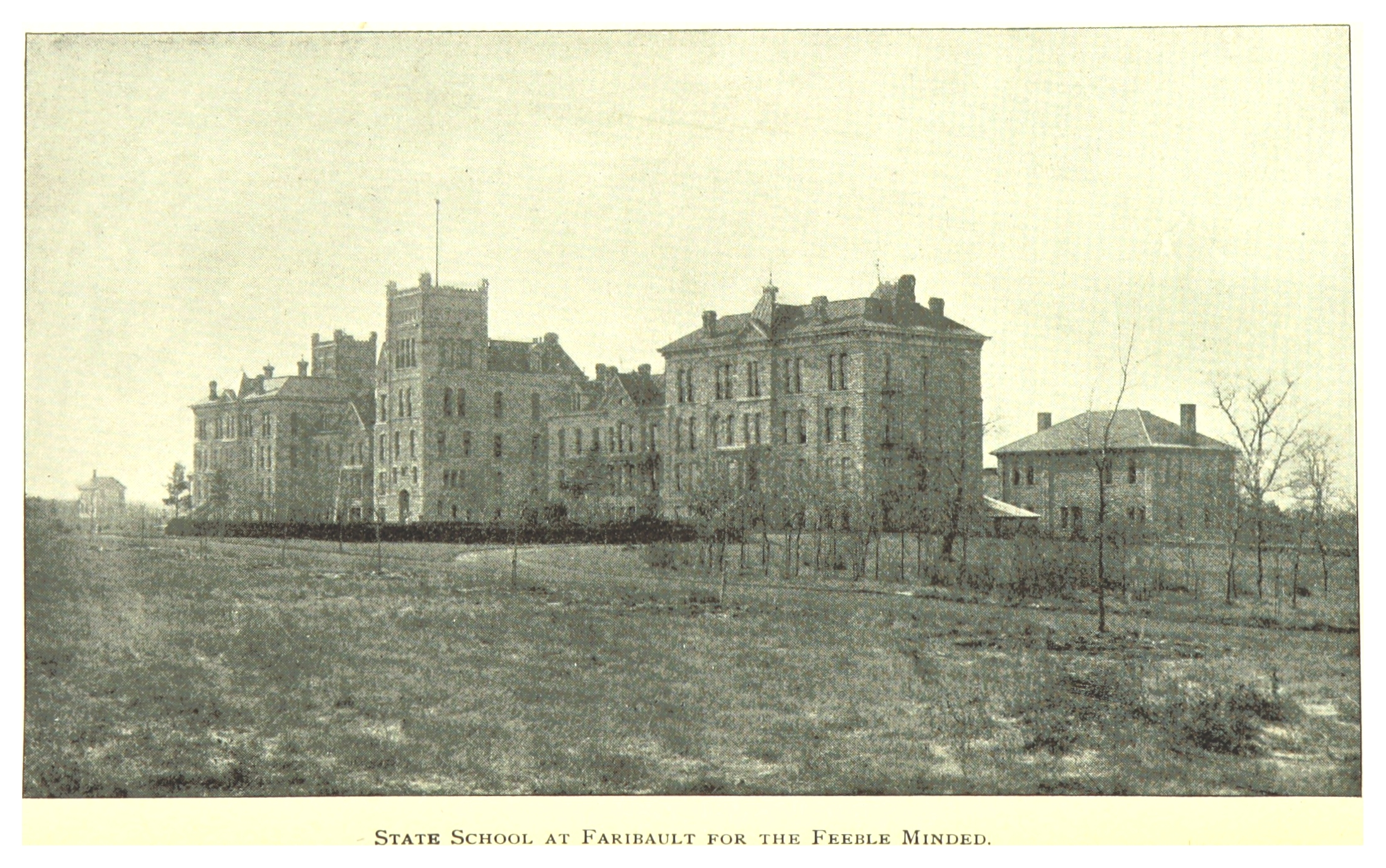
Minnesota School for the Feebleminded in Faribault

In 1911, Rogers arranged for research to occur in Minnesota on the families of the "feebleminded". Two fieldworkers from the Eugenics Record Office in Cold Spring Harbor, New York came to Minnesota to study families of inmates at the Minnesota School for the Feebleminded. The results of the study showed an "appalling amount" of hereditary "defectiveness" in Hog Hollow, a community in Minnesota. The report, Dwellers in the Vale of Siddem, depicted mentally ill and disabled people as social menaces and described the living conditions of those in Hog Hollow as lower than that of animals. Dwellers in the Vale of Siddem advocated against the reproduction of the "feebleminded" and laid a foundation for eugenics in the state.

From 1924 to 1959, probate judges and Mildred Thomson, director of the control board's Bureau for the Feebleminded and Epileptic, made decisions on which children to commit to institutions. Two physicians were supposed to be present for a decision to be made. This rule, however, could be eluded if the person was "obviously feebleminded". Factors like physical health, family relations, school and work records, home environment, appearance, and IQ scores influenced commitment decisions. Those who did not speak English were vulnerable to commitment because of an inability to pass English-language IQ tests. Low economic status and atypical behavior were considered symptoms of "feeblemindedness", which led to disproportionate commitment rates of working-class women.

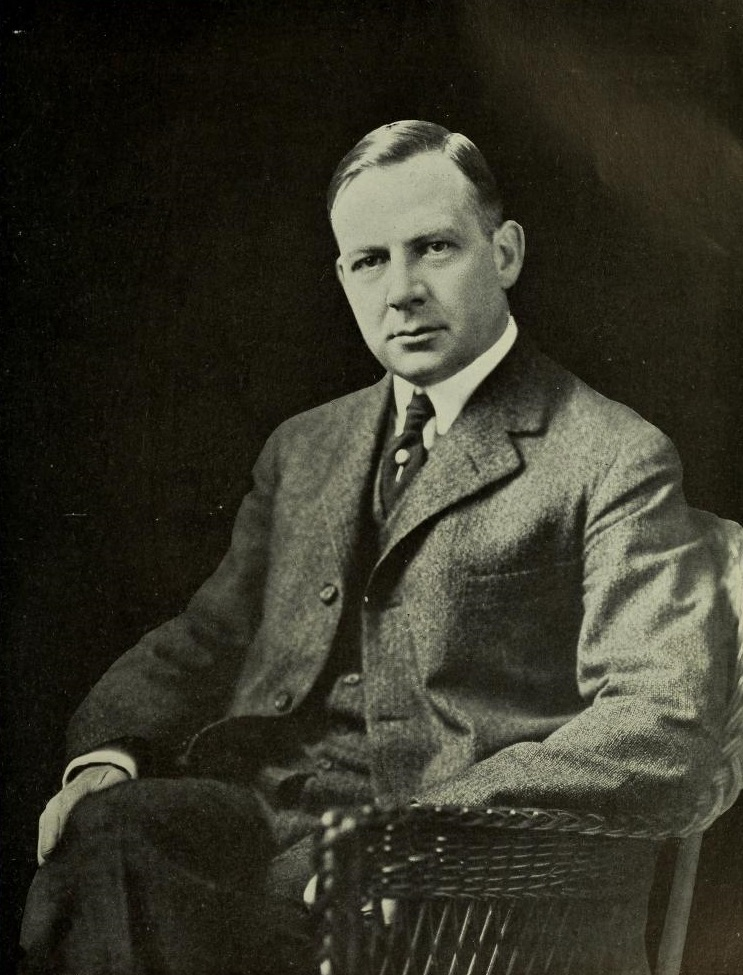
Lotus Coffman, President of the University of Minnesota

At the University of Minnesota, University President Lotus Coffman supported eugenic principles regarding racial segregation. Coffman was president of the university from 1920 until 1938. Coffman believed that racial segregation and a racial hierarchy was natural. He also believed that this "natural order" should be maintained by the control of reproduction. He thought that white, Protestant people should be allowed to reproduce, while people of color, Jewish, and Catholic people, as well as those with disabilities should have their reproduction controlled.

Rogers brought Frederick Kuhlmann, a psychologist, to the state, who would become one of Minnesota's most effective advocates for eugenics usage. In 1910, Kuhlmann, director of research at the Faribault School for the Feebleminded, pushed for IQ testing as a measure for "defectiveness". He administered IQ tests of thousands of Minnesotan students. He also helped to develop special education classes in the public schools of Minnesota to segregate student populations. Kuhlmann was an advocate for statewide testing of students so that those not immediately recognizable as "feebleminded" could be better identified and managed. This work led to a higher percentage of Minnesotans being labeled as "feebleminded".

Once under the guardianship of the state, individuals could not vote, make their own medical decisions, or own property. The vague definition of "feeblemindedness" led to the institutionalization of many "troublesome noncriminals" as a form of segregation, forcing them to leave their home communities and indefinitely institutionalizing them.

By 1924, with 27 people being committed every month, 1,802 people were placed under state guardianship. This policy caused state institutions to exceed their holding capacity and become overcrowded. Today, the majority of these new commitments would not be regarded as having a disability. County judges who usually had little training in social work were placed in charge of committing Minnesotans to state institutions. In many cases, IQ tests were used as evidence to wrongfully send whole families into state guardianship. The results of later tests proved that they were not "feebleminded". Eugenics was seen as a way to reduce the overpopulation problem in state institutions and most of the survivors were discharged three months after sterilizations were performed on them.

== Baby Health Contest ==
Rogers gave lectures on the topic of eugenics at the Minnesota State Fair in 1913. The fair also hosted the Baby Health Contest, which was grounded in eugenic ideology, that aimed to show off "human fitness". At the fair, Rogers stated that prize-winning babies were not necessarily complete models of "human fitness", instead claiming that the babies might be tainted with "an ancestry with a history of defectiveness."

When he assessed babies for "fitness", Rogers looked for certain characteristics, which he called stigmata, to search for "defectiveness". Stigmata included shape of the ears, the underside of the jaw, racial angles, and asymmetry. These characteristics were purposely racist. The Baby Health Contest occurred in a 20 feet by 20 feet glass cage, which allowed the public to watch nurses and physicians, including Frederick Kuhlmann, examine the babies.

Rogers and others promoted the idea that a single baby did not provide much data on the hereditary information they contained. Because of this, Dight and other eugenicists endorsed "Fitter Family" contests which examined whole families for "defectiveness". "Fitter Family" contests were never held at the Minnesota State Fair.

== Minnesota Eugenics Society ==
Charles Fremont Dight, a Minneapolis physician, is accredited as bringing the eugenics movement to Minnesota in the early 1920s. He approached this through eugenics education, limitations placed on marriages, and the segregation and sterilization of "unfit" individuals. Dight was a resident physician at the Shattuck School in Faribault, Minnesota and later took a position as professor of physiology at Hamline Medical School in Saint Paul. Between 1921 and 1935, Dight wrote over 300 articles on eugenics that appeared in Minnesota newspapers as well as hosting radio talks and lectures on the subject. In his editorials, Dight often compared human reproduction to the selective breeding techniques used in agriculture. He was also an outspoken supporter of Adolf Hitler and his eugenics program, praising his efforts to "stamp out mental inferiority". In response, Hitler invited Dight to Munich.

In 1923, Dight organized the Minnesota Eugenics Society, which campaigned for a statewide eugenics law. Members of the society included doctors, surgeons, scientists, lawyers, psychiatrists, physicians, and ministers. Albert E. Jenks, founder of the University of Minnesota's anthropology department, and E. P. Lyon, the dean of its medical school, were supporters of the Minnesota Eugenics Society. The society's members were all male, and lived throughout the entire state. Dight was voted as president of the Minnesota Eugenics Society on February 2, 1927 during its first annual meeting and remained president until his death in 1938.

=== Sterilization law of 1925 ===
In 1925, the Minnesota Legislature passed a bill, drafted by Representative Edwin L. MacLean, which would sterilize the "feebleminded" and "insane" living in the state's mental asylums. Dight considered people who were mentally ill, developmentally disabled, epileptic, criminals, and "sexual deviants" to be "feebleminded". Governor Theodore Christianson signed this bill into law. This law took effect on January 8, 1926. On this day, eight women living in a mental asylum in Faribault were sterilized. Unlike many other states in the United States, Minnesota's sterilization law required the consent of the person being operated on and the consent of their spouse or nearest kin. However, when deemed incompetent—which many of the "feeblemineded" and "insane" were—the state was allowed to make this choice in the absence of a guardian.

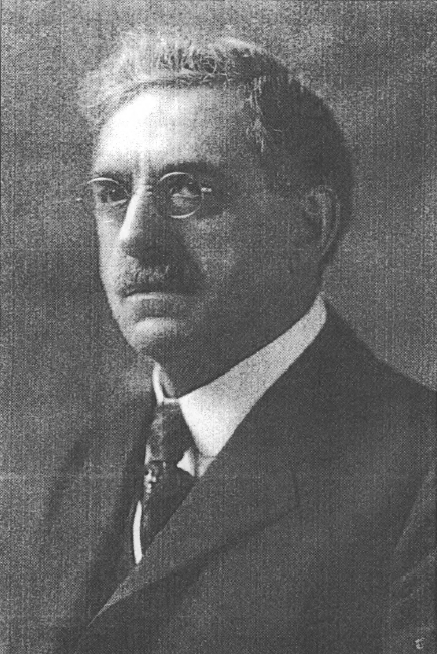
Dr. George G. Eitel, vice president of the Minnesota Eugenics Society and sterilization surgeon

Dr. George G. Eitel, vice present of the Minnesota Eugenics Society, performed the first 150 sterilization surgeries in the state. A consultation with a psychologist, usually Kuhlmann, was a requirement for the operation. This consultation always included at least one IQ test.

Dr. David J. Vail became the director of the Minnesota Department of Welfare in 1961, and, under his leadership, the rate of sterilizations dropped. In 1975, the law was altered to provide Minnesotans with a larger protection from sterilizations. Forced sterilization is still sanctioned in the state when authorized by a court order.

== Impact ==
At least 2,204 Minnesota residents were sterilized because of the 1925 law. 77 percent of those sterilized were women. The true number of those sterilized is unknown because Minnesota did not have an agency that tracked sterilizations, unlike other states. The impact of sterilization was not as substantial as Dight had hoped it would be. Dight had hoped to sterilize nearly 10 percent of the state's population.

Eugenics remained highly approved by many Minnesotans for decades after its institution in the state. Minnesotans like Charles Lindbergh, Dr. Charles Mayo, and Dr. William Mayo were supporters of sterilizing the "unfit". The Mayo brothers founded Mayo Clinic. Dr. Charles Mayo was very outspoken in his support of eugenics and the Kansas City Times called him an "apostle of the school of eugenics." Dr. William Mayo declined an invitation from Charles Fremont Dight to join the Minnesota Eugenics Society as its vice president in 1926.

Dight Avenue in Minneapolis was named for Charles Fremont Dight until March of 2022, when it was renamed to Cheatham Avenue, in honor of John Cheatham, Minneapolis's first Black fire captain. After the murder of George Floyd, as a program to divest from white supremacy, the Minnesota Disability Justice Network and City Council Member Andrew Johnson worked to rename the street. On March 17, 2022, the avenue was renamed to Cheatham Avenue.

In his will, Dight left his estate to the University of Minnesota to found the Dight Institute for the Promotion of Human Genetics, later named the Institute for Human Genetics, which remained active until the 1960s.

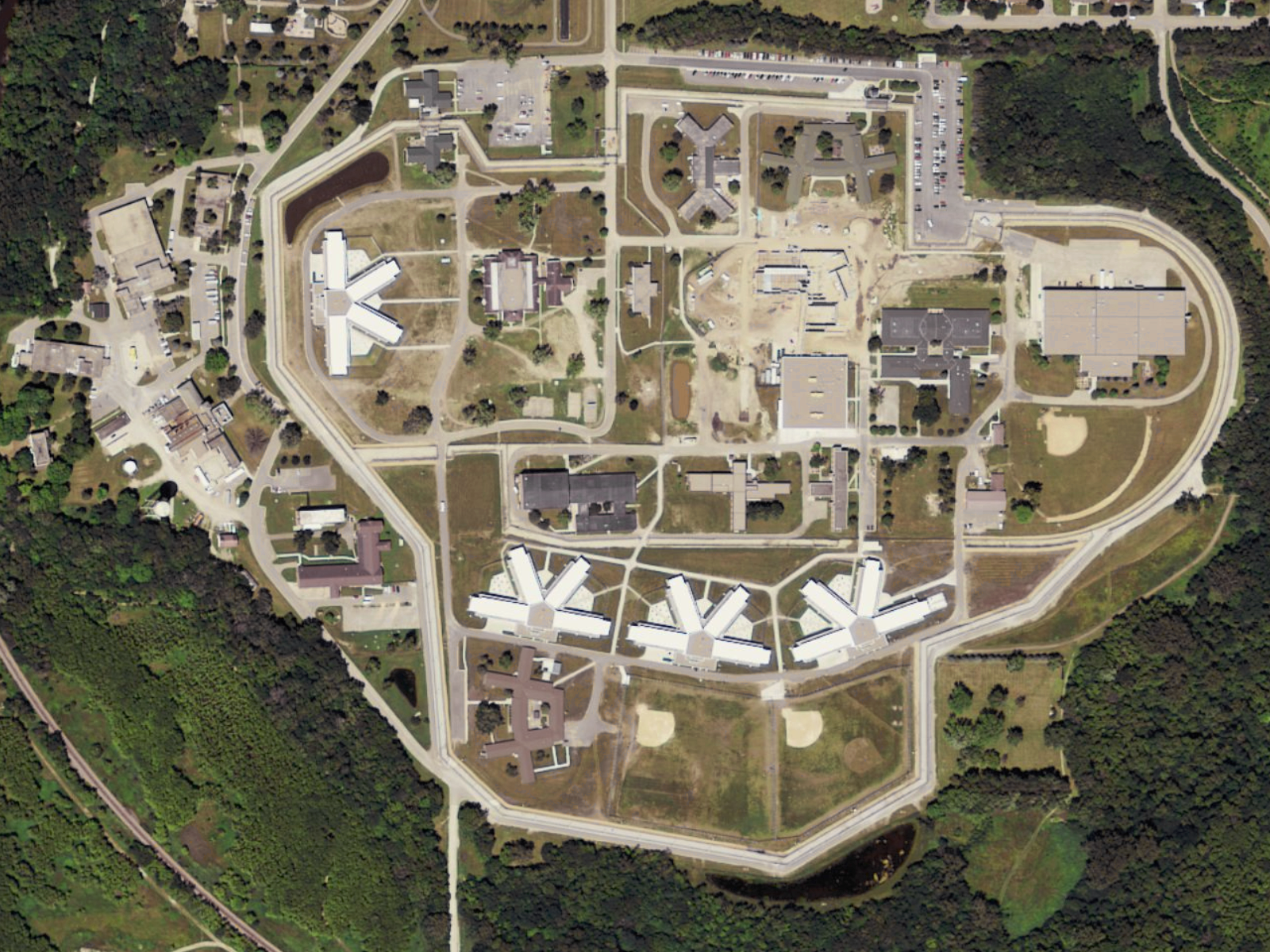
Minnesota Correctional Facility – Faribault, which operates on the former grounds of the Minnesota School for the Feebleminded

The Minnesota School for the Feebleminded closed in 1998 and the Minnesota Correctional Facility – Faribault now operates on its grounds.

Many Native American communities still face the effects of intergenerational trauma caused by the residential schools. The University of Minnesota Morris now operates on the campus of the Morris Industrial School for Indians, an American Indian boarding school operated by the Sisters of Mercy in Morris. Native American students receive free tuition to the university due to a federal mandate. As of 2018, over 20% of the students at the Morris campus identify as Native American. In other University of Minnesota campuses, only 2.5% of the student population identify as Native.

== Depiction ==
Sterilization and state guardianship in the Minnesota School for the Feebleminded is depicted in "Sequel to Love", a fictional short story by Meridel Le Sueur. In the story, Margaret is placed in the institution after she became pregnant while unmarried. Margaret is told that she will be unable to leave the institution until she becomes sterilized. She refuses to consent to a sterilization and remains an inmate at the conclusion of the story.

== See also ==
- Eugenics in the United States
- Sterilization law in the United States
- Charles Fremont Dight

== Notes ==
a. Two boarding schools were located in both Ponsford and White Earth.
