= George G. Eitel =

American surgeon; designed and built Eitel Hospital

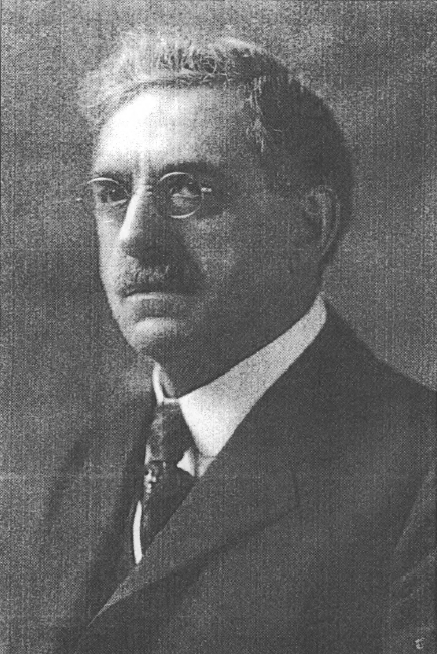
- Eitel c. 1914
- Born: George Gotthilf Eitel; September 28, 1858; Chaska, Minnesota
- Died: February 8, 1928 (aged 69); Minneapolis, Minnesota
- Resting place: Lakewood Cemetery
- Occupation: Surgeon
- Spouse: Jeannette E. Larsen

George Gotthilf Eitel (September 28, 1858 – February 8, 1928) was an American surgeon who designed and built Eitel Hospital in Minneapolis, Minnesota, in 1912. Eitel was its chief of staff for fifteen years until 1927, after which he was called proprietor.

He was persecuted during World War I for his German heritage. Eitel was an active member of a eugenics society and he and his nephew are remembered for carrying out early surgical sterilizations.

== Family and education ==
Eitel was born on a farm near Chaska, Minnesota, to John G. and Mary (Ulmer) Eitel who were immigrants from Württemberg in Germany. He attended Moravian Academy in Chaska. His father wanted him to join the family flour mill, but Eitel wanted at first to be a teacher, but changed his mind and apprenticed to a local doctor.

Eitel sold books door-to-door for two years to finance his education in medicine. In 1885, he entered Minnesota Hospital College in Minneapolis and graduated three years later with honors. Then he studied at the University of Berlin for a year, and after his return to the U.S., he practiced surgery for two years in Centralia, Washington. He graduated from the University of Pennsylvania medical school in 1891.

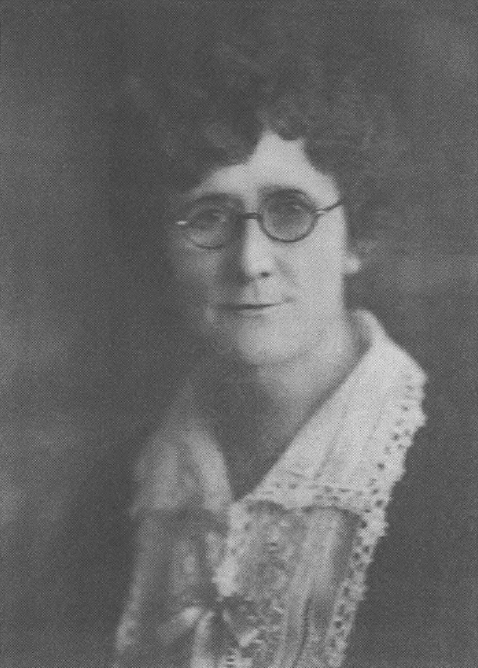
Jeannette Larsen Eitel c. 1914

He married Jeannette E. Larsen (born July 6, 1875, in Mona, Iowa) in Sioux Falls in January 1908. They had no children. One of his brothers, David Eitel served as secretary of his hospital. David's son was Dr. George D. Eitel, who succeeded George.

== Early career ==
Eitel returned to Minneapolis as an assistant to Dr. F. A. Dunsmoor, professor of surgery at the University of Minnesota. At Dunsmoor's recommendation, he became staff surgeon at Asbury Hospital (then in Elliot Park and today part of HealthPartners) and he served as a consulting surgeon at Northwestern Hospital. He then returned to the University of Berlin to study surgery in detail, where he specialized in appendectomies. He received his Doctor of Medicine degree in 1901, and returned to Minneapolis, dreaming of building his own hospital. He worked for Asbury, and for Saint Barnabas and City hospitals (both now Hennepin County Medical Center). Eitel was also a consulting surgeon for the Soo Line Railroad.

== Eitel Hospital ==
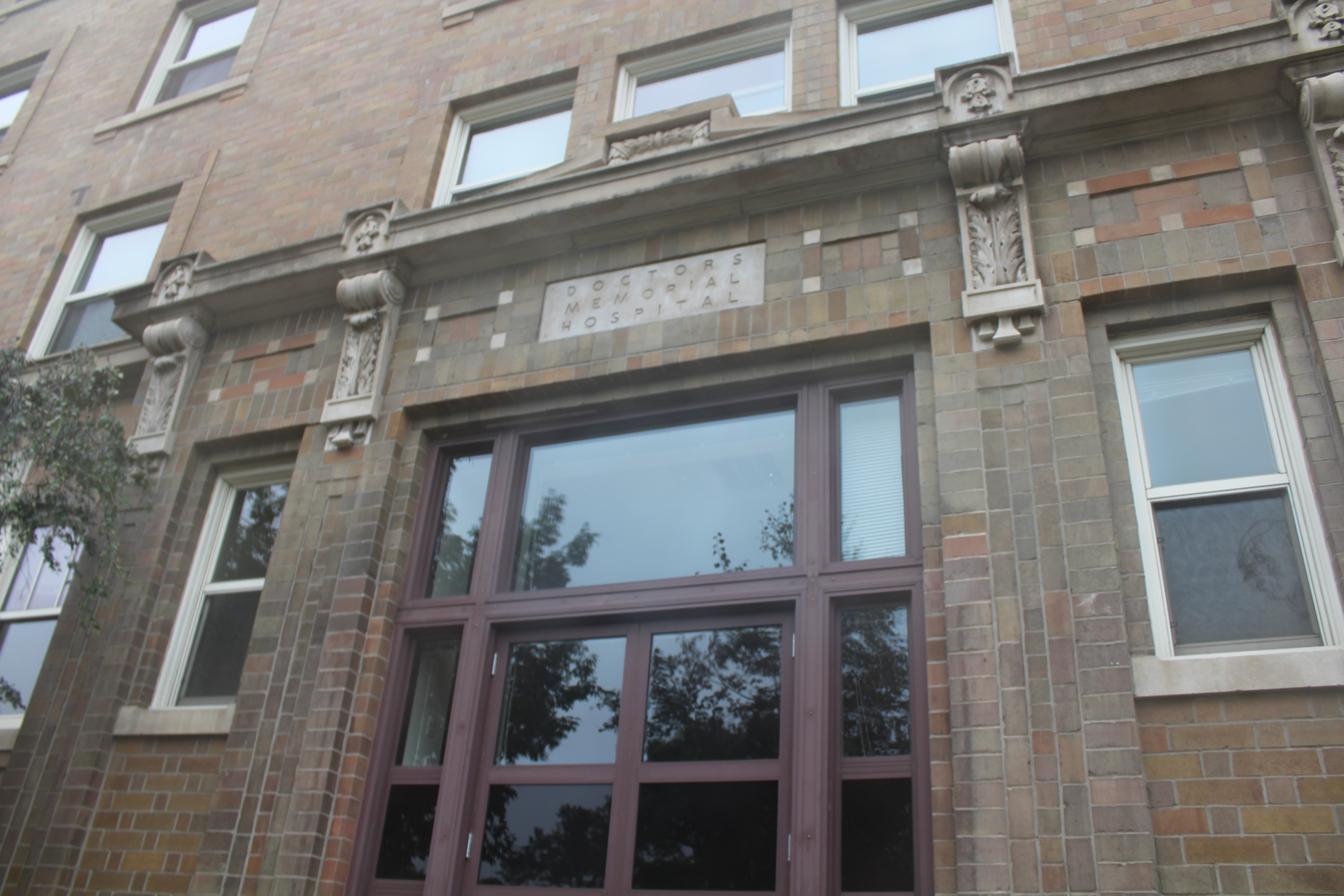
Former entrance to Eitel Hospital

The Minneapolis Journal first announced plans in 1906 and later published various renderings of his proposed hospital. Construction started in March 1911 and it opened in January 1912 with room for 100 patients. It cost $190,000 to build along with a training school for nurses. The private hospital served wealthy residents of Minneapolis. Sun porches had Navajo rugs and private rooms had brass beds and mahogany furniture. His wife Jeannette Eitel directed the nursing school.

The Eitels lived in an apartment accessible from the 14th Street entrance. The hospital building is today part of an apartment complex. As the hospital prospered, it expanded. To the south, an apartment building was renamed the Eitel Apartments. Next door at 1407–1409 Willow, Eitel built the six-story Eitel Clinic in 1926. Today the clinic is the Loring Medical Building.

== Persecution ==
After the U.S. entered World War I, Eitel and his wife were the subject of anti-German persecution and wild rumors. According to The Medical Fortnightly, in one 24-hour period reports emerged that:

- Mrs. Eitel was interned in a camp;
- Eitel and his wife were serving 25-year sentences in a federal penitentiary;
- he had been caught experimenting with poison hypodermics on enlisted men;
- he had been shot on the street; and
- he committed suicide.

And separately, that he, another surgeon, and their nurses had been shot at sunrise at Fort Snelling. The United States Department of Justice intervened on their behalf, and Eitel published a denial, pledging his loyalty to the U.S. in the Minneapolis Evening-Journal.

== Eugenics ==
Minnesota's eugenics law of 1925, targeting the institutionalized intellectually disabled and insane, sought to stop the births of children who might become public dependents. Eitel lobbied the Minnesota legislature in January 1925; his letter on Eitel Hospital stationery called the "feeble minded, epileptic or insane" a "most unfortunate and very expensive class of citizens...." Mildred Thomson supervised the Minnesota Department for the Feebleminded and Epileptic and was in large measure the administrator responsible for the sterilization process, that in Minnesota was a complicated affair in which the subject or guardian must give consent. Eitel became vice president (1925–1926) of the Minnesota Eugenics Society formed by Charles Fremont Dight who promoted eugenics for most of his later life. Molly Ladd-Taylor writes that "the responsibilities of the [other] medical men were more professional and longer-lasting," noting that of course "a surgeon was necessary to perform" the sterilizations.

Eitel and his wife and surgical nurse performed sterilization operations one day each month at the Minnesota School for the Feebleminded (now the state's largest prison, the medium-security Minnesota Correctional Facility) in Faribault from 1926 until his death in 1928, amounting to 150 operations. His work was praised at the time. Eitel's nephew, Dr. George D. Eitel, succeeded him and with A. L. Herman and David Stern performed nearly a thousand sterilizations. Through 1945, 80 percent of those sterilized at the school were female. In actuality, the women diagnosed as "feeble minded" may have experienced disability, poverty, family violence, incest, or sexual abuse.

== Death ==
Eitel died of a heart attack on February 8, 1928, in Eitel Hospital while recovering from influenza. He is buried in Lakewood Cemetery in Minneapolis.

== Gallery ==
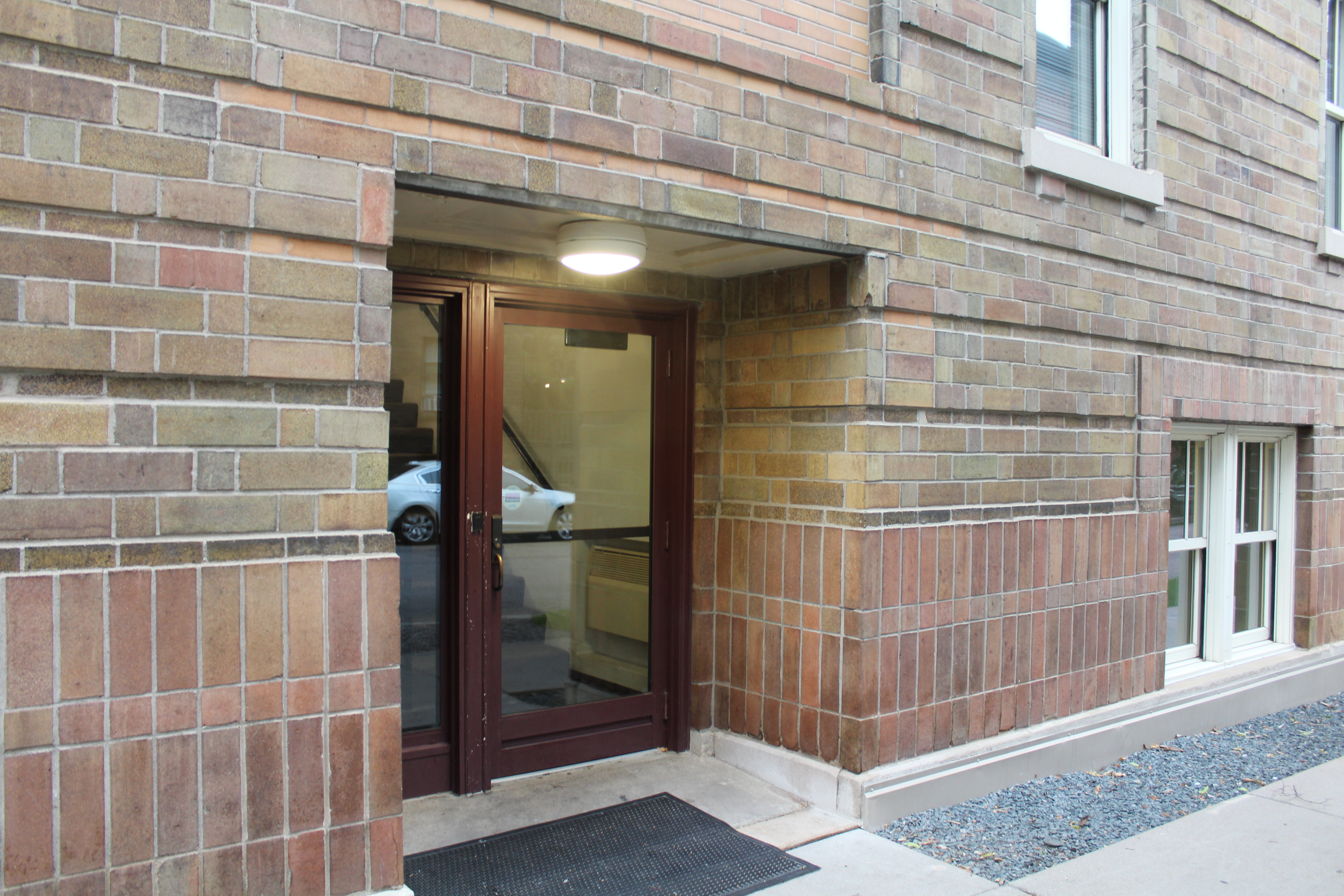
Former entrance to the Eitels' apartment

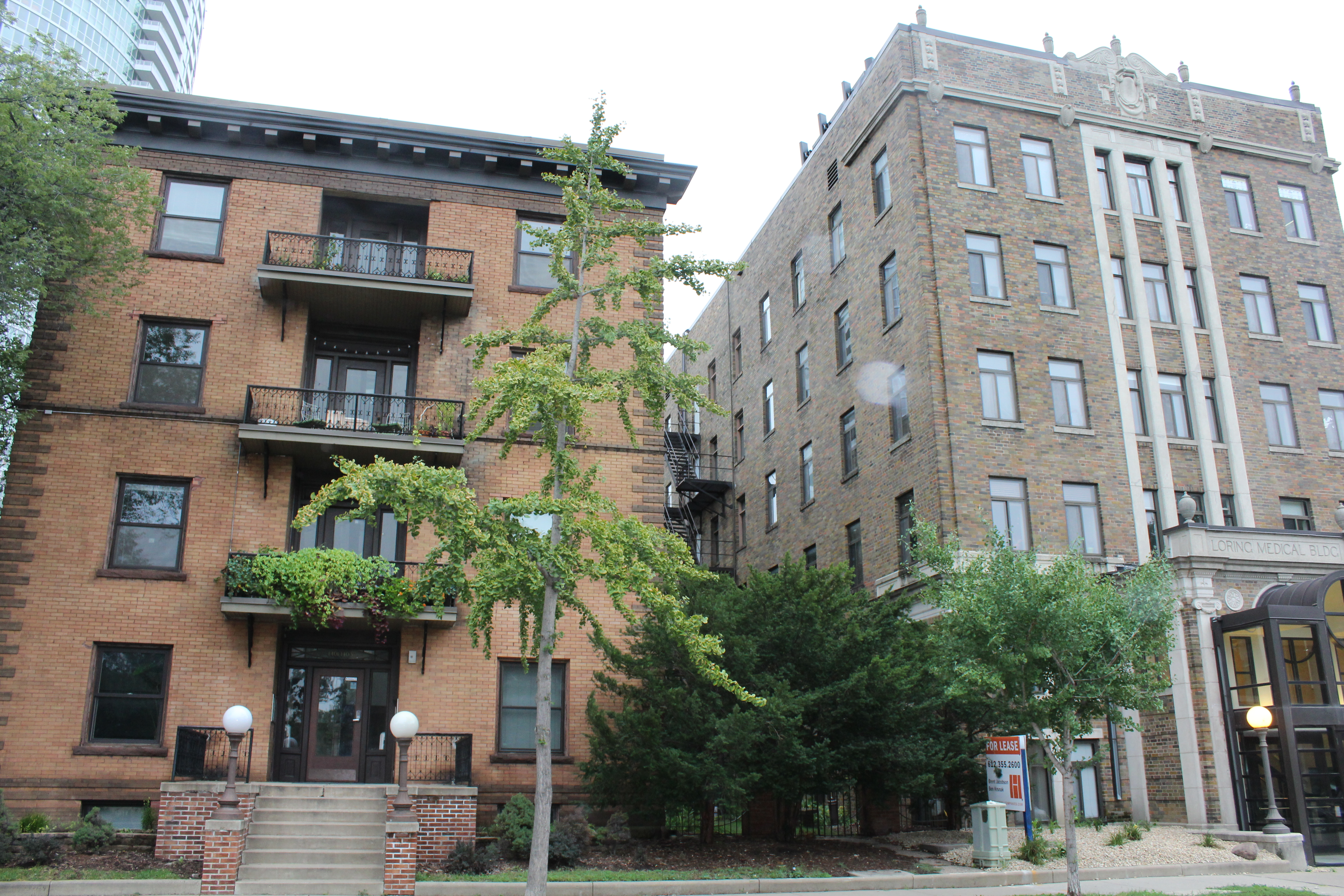
Former Eitel Apartments and Eitel Clinic

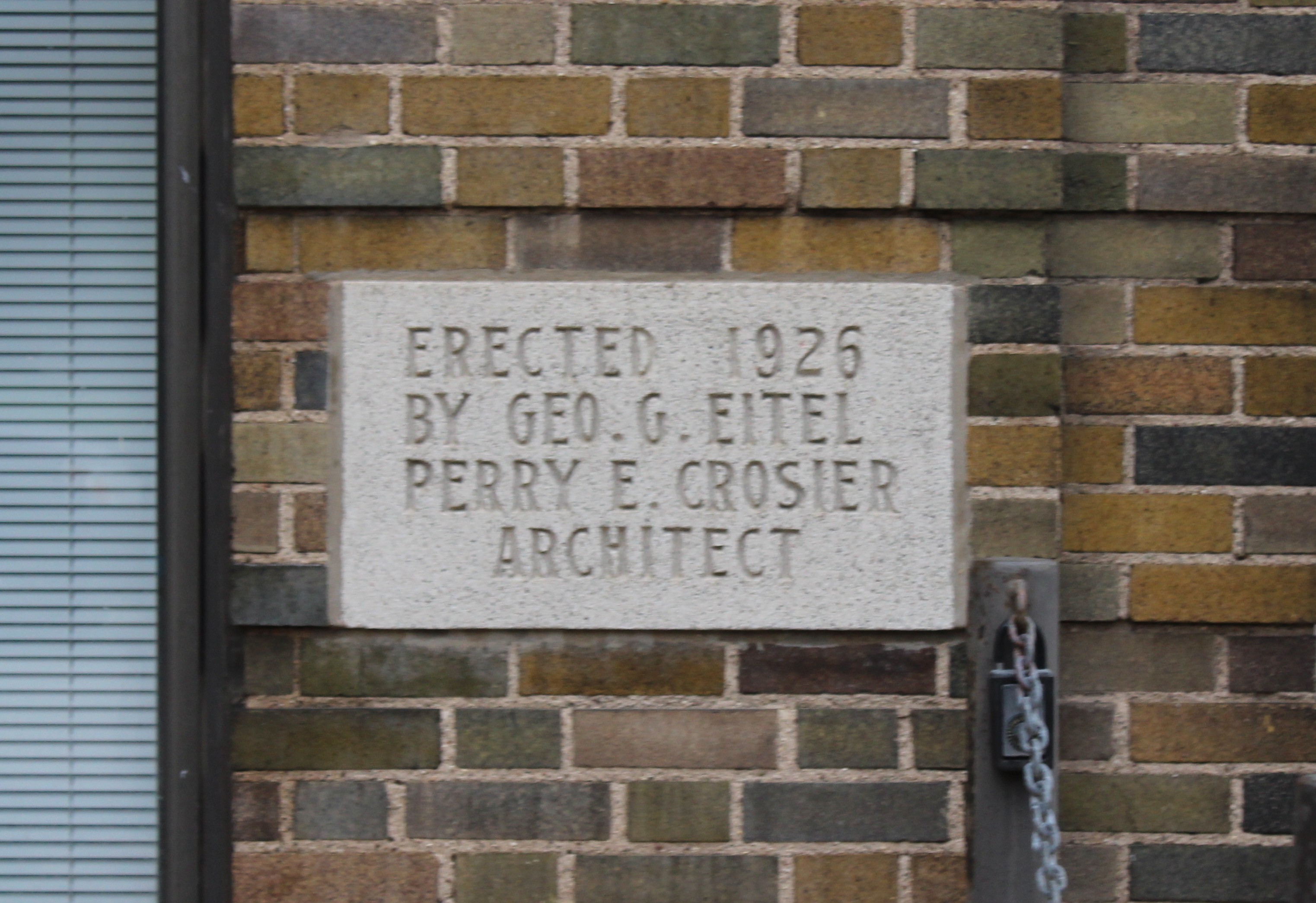
Sign on former Eitel Clinic

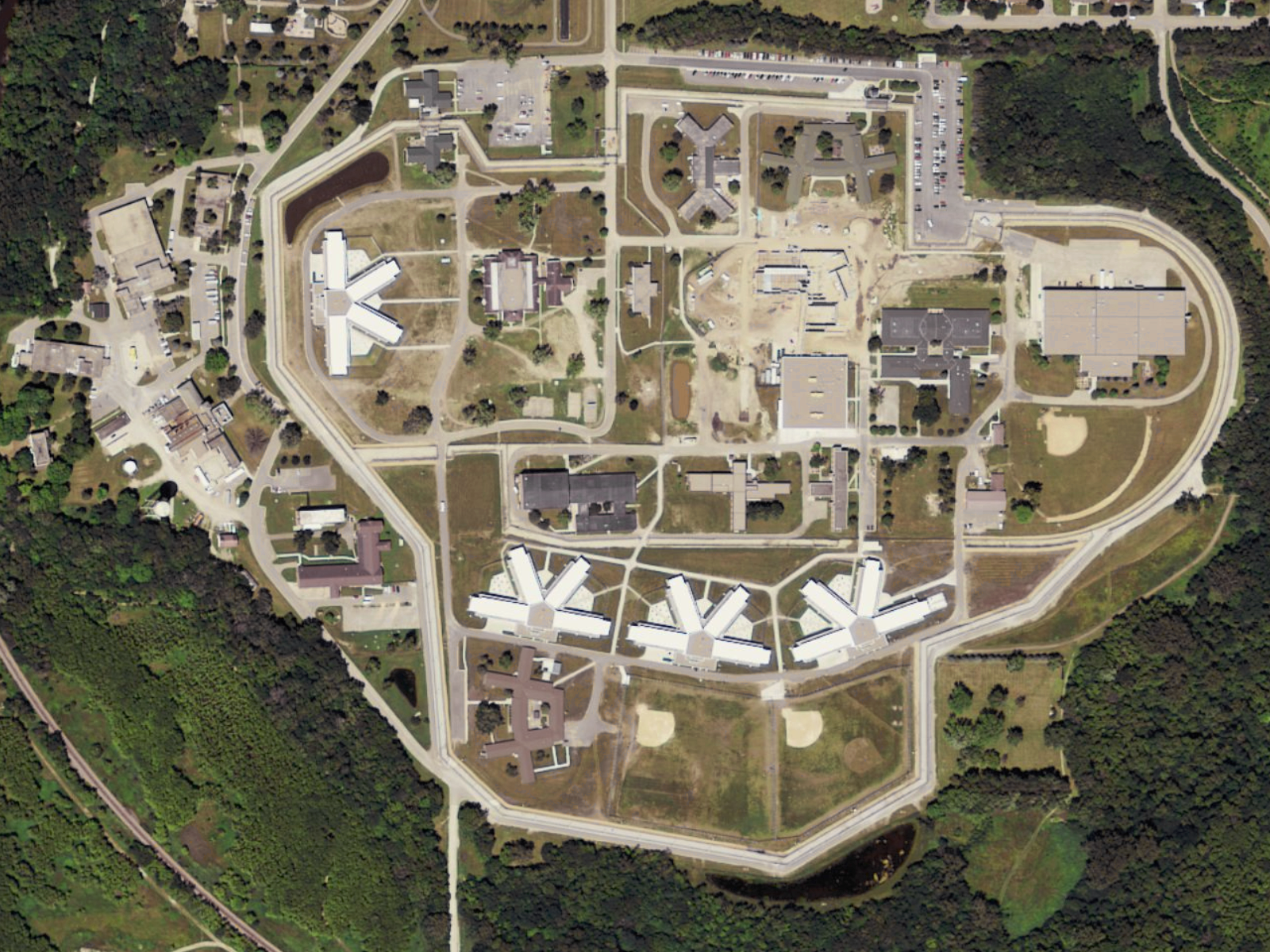
Today's Minnesota Correctional Facility on the site of the former School for the Feebleminded in Faribault

== See also ==
- Eugenics in Minnesota
