= Dwellers in the Vale of Siddem =

Eugenic book published in 1919

Dwellers in the Vale of Siddem: A True Story of the Social Aspect of Feeble-Mindedness
- Author: Arthur C. Rogers, Maud A. Merrill
- Publisher: The Gorham Press
- Publication date: 1919
- OCLC: 3489570
- LC Class: HV3006.M6 F6
- Website: https://mn.gov/mnddc/past/pdf/10s/18/18-DIV-ACR.pdf

Dwellers in the Vale of Siddem: A True Story of the Social Aspect of Feeble-Mindedness is a book published in 1919, written by Arthur C. Rogers and Maud A. Merrill. The book is a compiled account of family histories of families living in Minnesota near the Mississippi River, in an area of caves and ravines pseudonymously referred to as Hog Hollow. Most likely, the community of Hog Hollow was located in Goodhue County, Minnesota.

== History ==
In collaboration with Charles Davenport, Arthur C. Rogers, the superintendent of the Minnesota School for the Feeble-Minded in Faribault, arranged for two fieldworkers from the New York Eugenics Records Office to study the families of those institutionalized at the school. Fieldworkers Saidee Devitt and Marie Curial, traveled though Minnesota to compile the family histories of those institutionalized at the Faribault School. Curial was from Anoka, Minnesota. This research was funded by the Minnesota Legislature. The Minnesota Legislature allocated $10,000 for two years of research to be directed by Rogers. Over a period of several years, Devitt and Curial compiled family histories of 549 families throughout the state, related to those institutionalized in Faribault.

After Rogers's death in 1917, Maud A. Merrill, his co-author and research assistant compiled Dwellers in the Vale of Siddem based on a group of families likely living in Goodhue County. Dwellers in the Vale of Siddem was purportedly just one book out of a series planned by Rogers.

Merrill's title, Dwellers in the Vale of Siddem is a reference to the biblical cities of Sodom and Gomorrah. Merrill referred to the people written of in the book as "grandchildren of the devil" and "ugly cancers of the social system". The book often painted those studied as living beneath the status of animals. Jolene Hubbs, a professor of American studies at the University of Alabama, described Dwellers in the Vale of Siddem as adding "a bigger-than-average dollop of yellow journalism to a potboiling narrative of degenerate families living in southeastern Minnesota".

The field studies concluded upon Rogers's death. Collected data was later analyzed by University of Minnesota geneticists Sheldon and Elizabeth Reed at the Dight Institute for Human Genetics. The pair published their work "Mental Retardation: A Family Study" in 1965

== Use in Minnesotan eugenics movement ==
Dwellers in the Vale of Siddem argued that "feeble-mindedness" is genetic and passed through families. In this book, Rogers and Merrill posit that the reproduction of "feeble-minded" people placed large burdens on Minnesota's social systems and charities. Specifically, the book attempted to show that specific small areas of the state contributed heavily to social problems. Rogers and Merrill also argued that "high-grade feeble-minded" people ("morons") are more genetically "dangerous" than "low-grade feeble-minded" people ("idiots" and "imbeciles").

Dwellers in the Vale of Siddem alongside research by Charles Davenport and Henry H. Goddard was used to justify eugenic ideas. These documents called for society at large to be protected from the "dysgenic menace" by segregation or forced sterilization. Rogers and Merrill argued that the only way to stop the "burden" placed on Minnesota's social systems by those they deemed "feeble-minded" from continuing into the next generation was segregation through institutionalization.

Rogers and Merrill's research was used to sway public opinion and convince Minnesota's Child Welfare Commission to believe that "feeble-mindedness" was a problem. The research was also used to advocate for a compulsory commitment law requiring "feeble-minded" children be segregated from their communities through institutionalization at the Faribault School for the Feeble-Minded or similar institutions. In a 1917 report, the Child Welfare Commission stated that "feeble-mindedness" was found in nearly every Minnesotan community but that nothing could be done about it as parents had legal autonomy over the institutionalization of their children. Particularly, the commission stated that a compulsory commitment law would be important for girls and women of reproductive age. The 1917 Children's Code included legislation allowing for children in Minnesota to be institutionalized without the consent of parents or guardians if deemed "feeble-minded." The Children's Code was the "starting point of eugenics laws" within the state.

== See also ==
- Eugenics in Minnesota
- The Kallikak Family
