= Noah McCourt =

American autistic disability rights activist, politician and public speaker

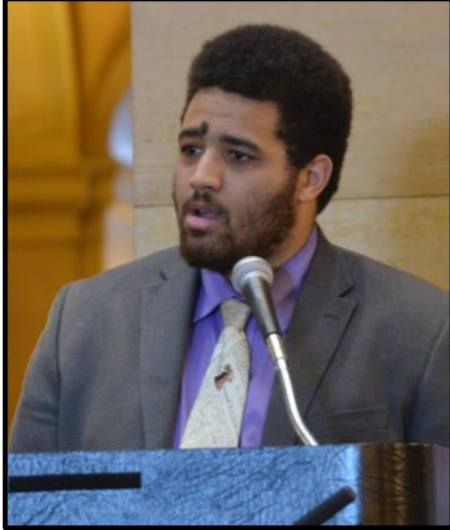
Noah McCourt addressing disability advocates in the rotunda of the Minnesota State Capitol

Noah McCourt (born 1994) is an American autistic disability rights activist, politician and social critic who was honored by the United Nations in 2016. McCourt is a former member of the Minnesota Governor's Council on Developmental Disabilities and the State Advisory Council on Mental Health, where he served as the chair of the State Subcommittee on Children's Mental Health.

== Political activism ==
In 2015, McCourt founded the South Metro Chapter of the Minnesota Young Republicans Organization, which encompassed the southwestern suburbs of Minneapolis. McCourt served as the chapter's first chairman. While running for City Council in Waconia, Minnesota, in 2016, McCourt faced criticism from his opponent in the local media for recently being released from the court ordered guardianship of his father, Craig McCourt. The story was picked up by the Minnesota Star Tribune, which resulted in McCourt being dubbed a trailblazer for disabled people. McCourt lost the City Council race to incumbent Charles Erickson, 1,462 to 1,121.

Following his failed bid for Waconia City Council, McCourt was invited to New York City to address the United Nations in recognition of World Autism Awareness day. McCourt spoke on autonomy and the right to self-determination. After his return from New York City, Minnesota Governor Mark Dayton appointed McCourt to serve on the Minnesota Council on Developmental Disabilities. McCourt's appointment to the council received supportive comments from David Durenberger, who served as the United States Senator from Minnesota from 1978 to 1995. McCourt's priorities on the Council include fostering self advocacy and probate law reform.

In 2018, McCourt endorsed Dave Hutchinson for Hennepin County Sheriff. Later that year, McCourt publicly backed Judy Moe for the City of Richfield's third ward City Council seat.

McCourt left the Republican Party in 2018 citing ideological differences. In 2021, McCourt endorsed Samantha Pree- Stinson for the Minneapolis Board of Estimate and Taxation and Jason Chavez-Cruz for Minneapolis City Council seat representing the city's Ninth Ward.

== Disability advocacy ==
McCourt has been a vocal advocate for improving access to services in rural Minnesota and strengthening parity laws. McCourt has also been an proponent for increasing access to public transit systems and increasing funding for autism research.

In October 2017, McCourt was tackled by officers from the Chaska Police Department, while experiencing a personal crisis. After the incident, McCourt was critical of the department's policies on responding to individuals with autism and mental health diagnoses. In response to McCourt's criticism, the Chaska Police Department blocked him from their official social media pages. McCourt subsequently filed suit in United States District Court alleging that the Twitter ban violated the First Amendment. In May 2019, the Federal District Court ordered the City of Chaska to unblock McCourt on Twitter.

McCourt was one of the keynote speakers at the 2018 Disability Day rally at the Minnesota State Capitol. He spoke on the importance of having self advocates engaged in the political process.

In September 2018, McCourt filed suit against Carver County, the City of Chanhassen and the City of Norwood Young America alleging that their websites failed to meet the Web Content Accessibility Guidelines and violated the American with Disabilities Act and Section 504 of the Rehabilitation Act of 1973.

In 2019 in response to a report from the Center for Disease Control regarding rising prevalence rates of autism, Minnesota State Senator Jim Abeler created a legislative work group called the Minnesota Autism Council. McCourt was critical of Abeler's decision to appoint leaders of the anti-vaccine movement to the council. McCourt has continued to be a vocal critic of the anti-vaccine movement and the Vaccine Safety Council of Minnesota.

McCourt founded the Minnesota Disability Justice Network, following the murder of George Floyd to give Minnesotans living with disabilities a voice in social justice movements and the ongoing conversations around police misconduct McCourt was arrested on the highway with fellow activist leaders Nekima Levy Armstrong and Monique Cullars-Doty in November 2020. McCourt chaired the 4 cents per hour coalition, a coalition of disability rights activists and organizations committed to eliminating the use of the subminimum wage in Minnesota for employees with disabilities. As a result of the coalition's work, the Minnesota State Legislature passed legislation to phase out the subminimum wage in Minnesota by 2025.

In 2021, McCourt and his disability justice network led a petition drive to rename Dight Avenue in South Minneapolis, which is named after Charles Fremont Dight, the founder of the Minnesota Eugenics Society and Nazi Sympathizer. The petition garnered over 29,000 signatures. At the end of 2021, Minneapolis officials announced that Dight Avenue would be renamed for John Cheatham, one of the first Black firefighters in the city.

McCourt filed suit against the Minnesota Secretary of State in 2020 arguing that the state's ban on participation by individuals on probation and immigrants in precinct caucuses was unconstitutional and violated the First amendment right to Free Speech and Association. In a 2022, landmark ruling the Minnesota Court of Appeals concluded that " by the plain language of the statutes, the criminal penalties in the election-eligibility statute and the unlawful-voting statute do not apply to the caucus- eligibility statute."

== Personal life ==
McCourt enjoys philosophy and classical logic. He resides in Waconia, Minnesota. He is African-American.

McCourt serves on the board of directors for the Minnesota Association on Children's Mental Health.
