= Mary A. G. Dight =

American physician

Mary A. G. Dight M.D.
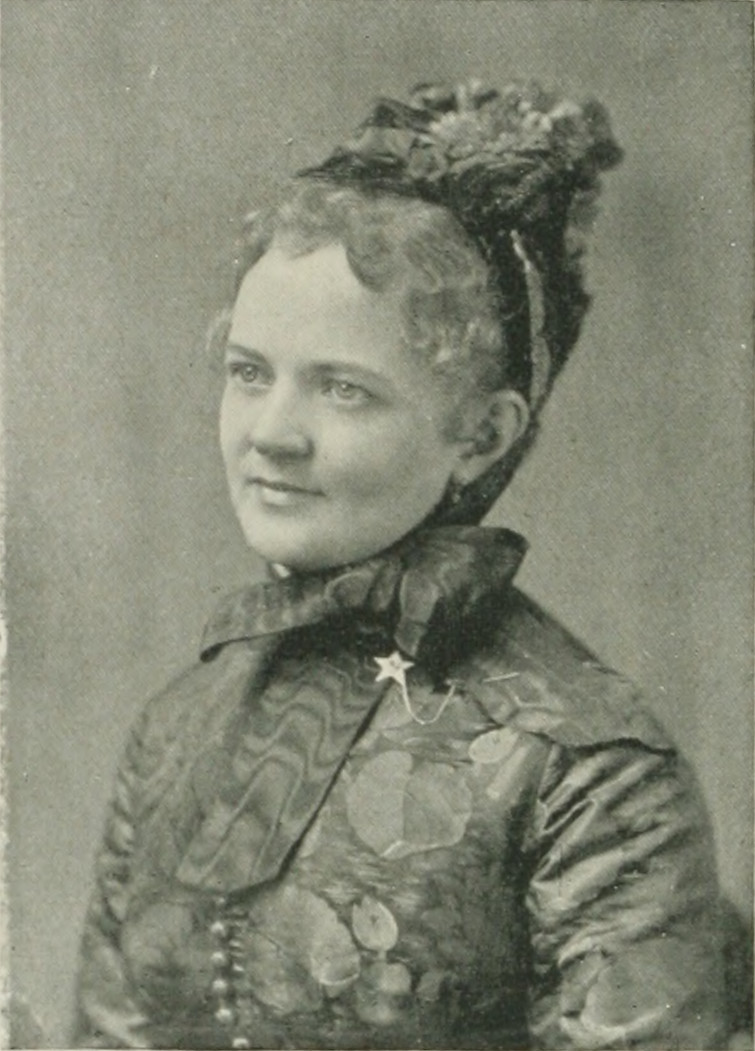
- "A Woman of the Century"
- Born: Mary Alice Glidden Crawford; November 7, 1860; Portsmouth, Ohio, U.S.
- Died: February 8, 1923 (aged 62); Colebrook, New Hampshire, U.S.
- Education: New England Conservatory of Music; University of Michigan
- Occupation: physician
- Spouses: Benjamin C. Trago (m. 1885; div.); Charles Fremont Dight (m. 1892; div. 1899)
- Medical career
- Institutions: Hempstead Academy of Medicine; Woman's Hospital of Philadelphia

Mary A. G. Dight (November 7, 1860 – February 8, 1923) was an American physician. She served as president of the Hempstead Academy of Medicine, had charge of the Woman's Hospital of Philadelphia, and was a pioneer in pursuing the establishment of a woman's medical college in New Orleans. During her marriage to Charles Fremont Dight, she was a supporter of the human eugenics movement.

== Biography ==
Mary (nickname, "Minnie")Alice Glidden Crawford was born in Portsmouth, Ohio, on November 7, 1860. (Note: Strong records her name as Alice G. Crawford.) She was the only daughter of Mary Young (Glidden) and George Crawford. Her mother descended from New England families. Dight's mother supported the higher education of women and encouraged her daughter to pursue the profession of her choice. Minnie had two brothers, George and John.

Dight was an accomplished musician and a graduate of the New England Conservatory of Music in Boston. She spoke German fluently. She was graduated from the Department of Regular Medicine and Surgery of the University of Michigan Medical School, one of the youngest of the class of 1884. She was also a graduate of the College of Homeopathic Medicine and Surgery, University of Minnesota, 1892.

Returning to Ohio, she practiced medicine for a year. She wed Benjamin C. Trago, on May 9, 1885, but unhappy in the marriage, she went abroad in 1886 and continued her studies in Paris and Vienna for two years. She returned to Portsmouth and was chosen president of the Hempstead Academy of Medicine.

While a medical student, she made the acquaintance of Professor Charles Fremont Dight, M. D., at that time one of the medical faculty of the University of Michigan, who after a six year professorship in the American Medical College in Beirut, Syria, returned to the U.S. to marry her, in 1892; they divorced in 1899.

Dight urged efforts for social reforms. Her home was in Faribault, Minnesota.

Mary A. G. Dight died in Colebrook, New Hampshire, on February 8, 1923. Her estate was administered in Philadelphia, Pennsylvania.
