= Eitel Hospital =

- U.S. National Register of Historic Places
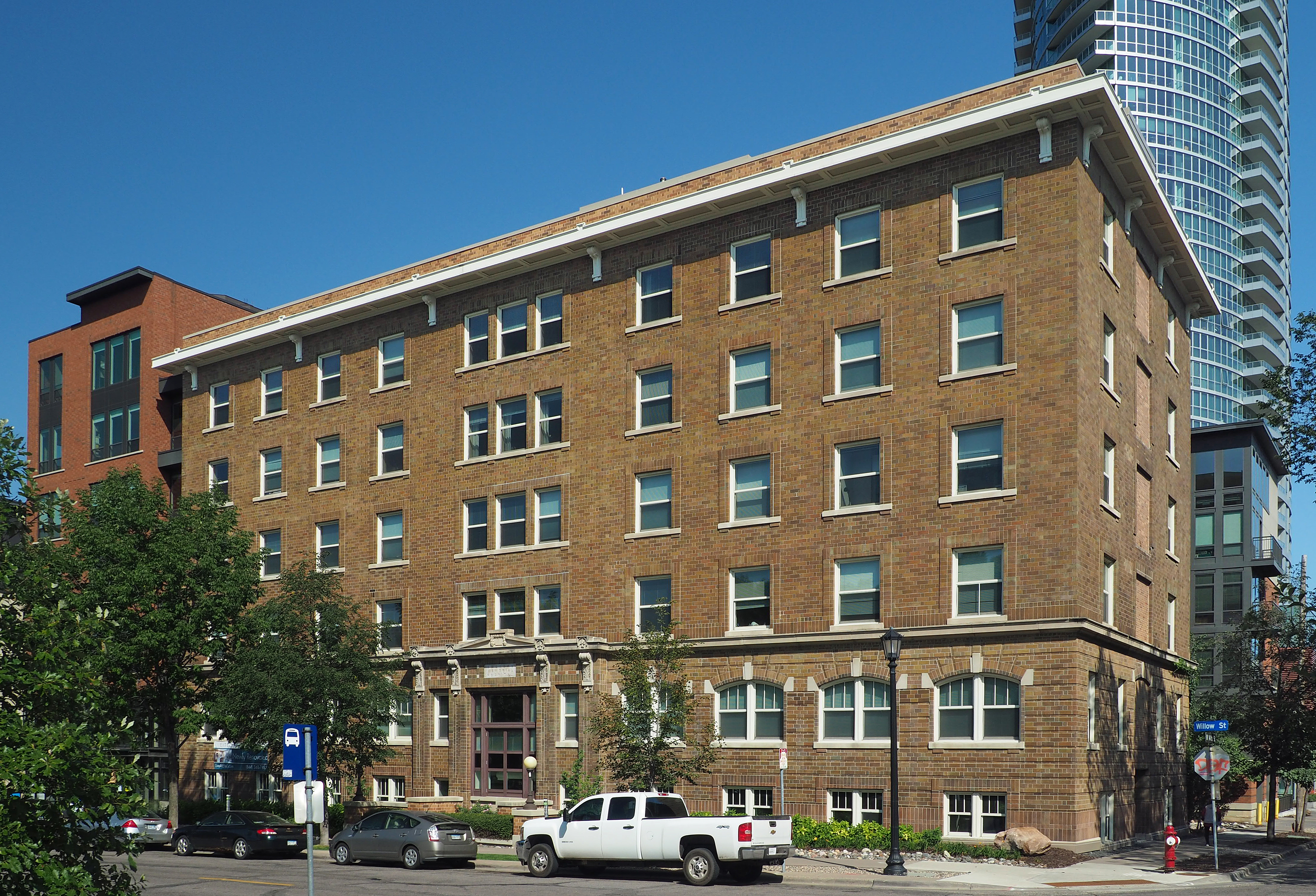
- The Eitel Hospital viewed from the southwest

- Location within Minnesota Location within the United States
- Location: 1367 Willow St., Minneapolis, Minnesota
- Coordinates: 44°58′8″N 93°16′52″W
- Built: 1911
- Architect: Lowell A. Lamoreaux
- Architectural style: Late 19th And 20th Century Revivals, Classical Revival
- NRHP reference No.: 07001313
- Added to NRHP: December 26, 2007

Eitel Hospital (later renamed "Doctors Memorial Hospital") is a former hospital building in Minneapolis, located across from Loring Park. It is listed on the National Register of Historic Places. The building is a brick building primarily in the Classical Revival style, made plainer when its original cornice was removed.

== History ==
The hospital was founded by George G. Eitel in 1912 and served wealthy citizens of Minneapolis. The Minneapolis Journal first announced plans in 1906, and published drawings for a four-story hospital in 1907. Fund raising caused construction delays. In January 1911, the paper published renderings by Long, Lamoreaux & Long for a five-story hospital, and in June for eight stories. It was finally built as five stories on a basement.

It featured sun porches with Navajo rugs and private rooms with brass beds and mahogany furniture. His wife Jeannette Eitel, a nurse, directed the nursing school. The Eitels lived in an apartment accessible from 14th Street. Eitel's nephew, George D. Eitel, ran the hospital after his uncle's death.

In 1982, it began a formal alliance with Abbott Northwestern Hospital, and in 1985, the 144-bed hospital closed. The building later became the Willow Street Center for Youth and Families.

In 2005, Village Green Companies submitted a proposal for renovating the former Eitel Hospital building into apartments, along with two additional six-story buildings on the block. The proposal included an adaptive reuse renovation of the 1911 building, along with rebuilding the cornice in a design similar to the original cornice. Later additions to the building were proposed for demolition. Ground was broken on the complex on October 25, 2006 and Eitel Building City Apartments was completed in September 2008.
