= Edwin L. MacLean =

American politician and lawyer

Member of the Minnesota House of Representatives
- In office January 2, 1923 – January 3, 1927

Member of the Minnesota Senate
- In office January 4, 1927 – January 5, 1931

Personal details
- Born: August 9, 1890 Duluth, Minnesota
- Died: October 18, 1968 (aged 78) Hennepin County, Minnesota
- Education: University of Minnesota, University of Cambridge, Yale Law School, University of Washington

Edwin Lockwood MacLean (August 9, 1890 – October 18, 1968) was an American politician and lawyer who was a member of the Minnesota House of Representatives from 1923 until early 1927 and a member of the Minnesota Senate from 1927 until early 1931.

MacLean was born in Duluth, Minnesota. He graduated from Central High School in Minneapolis, Minnesota in 1908. He then graduated from the University of Minnesota in 1912, and attended graduate school at Cambridge University for two years. He studied law at Yale Law School for two years and received a law degree in 1916 from the University of Washington.

MacLean served in the United States Infantry in World War I for five years, becoming a captain. He was a part of the Disabled American Veterans.

During his time as a Minnesota legislator, MacLean sponsored many bills, including a forced-sterilization bill which was passed into law in 1925. He also co-sponsored bills with Sue Metzger Dickey Hough about gun control and car insurance.
