= John Cheatham =

American firefighter

- Portrait of Cheatham
- Born: John W. Cheatham; 1855; St. Louis, Missouri, U.S.
- Died: 1918 (aged 62–63); Minneapolis, Minnesota, U.S.
- Burial place: Minneapolis Pioneers and Soldiers Memorial Cemetery
- Monuments: Cheatham Avenue
- Occupation: Firefighter
- Known for: Racial integration of the Minneapolis Fire Department

John W. Cheatham (1855–1918) was an American firefighter in Minneapolis. Born as an enslaved person in St. Louis, Missouri, Cheatham was freed at the age of eight by the Emancipation Proclamation, and then moved to Minneapolis, Minnesota, with his family shortly thereafter. In 1883, at the age of 33, Cheatham was appointed as one of the first Black firefighters in Minneapolis. He held several leadership positions during his fire department career. In 2022, the City of Minneapolis re-designated a street in the Longfellow community as Cheatham Avenue to honor his legacy of racial integration within the city’s fire department.

== Early life ==
John W. Cheatham was born in 1855 to an enslaved family in the U.S. state of Missouri. His family was freed by the Emancipation Proclamation of 1862. Shortly thereafter, at the age of eight, his family moved from St. Louis, Missouri, to Minneapolis, Minnesota. The Cheathams were among the first Black families to reside in Minneapolis.

== Career ==
Cheatham worked as a laborer. He held jobs as a church sexton and porter.

In 1888, at the age of 33, Cheatham was appointed to the Minneapolis Fire Department by a White fire chief. He was either the first, or one of the first, Black firefighters in the city.

Cheatham's first job with the fire department was as a pipeman. He was promoted to a driver after three years with the department, and after about five years he was promoted to the rank of lieutenant. He then obtained the rank of captain in 1899, but was demoted back to pipeman a year later for refusing to comply with an order from a White firefighter who held the same rank as him. Cheatham worked at several fire stations in Minneapolis in the first part of his career.

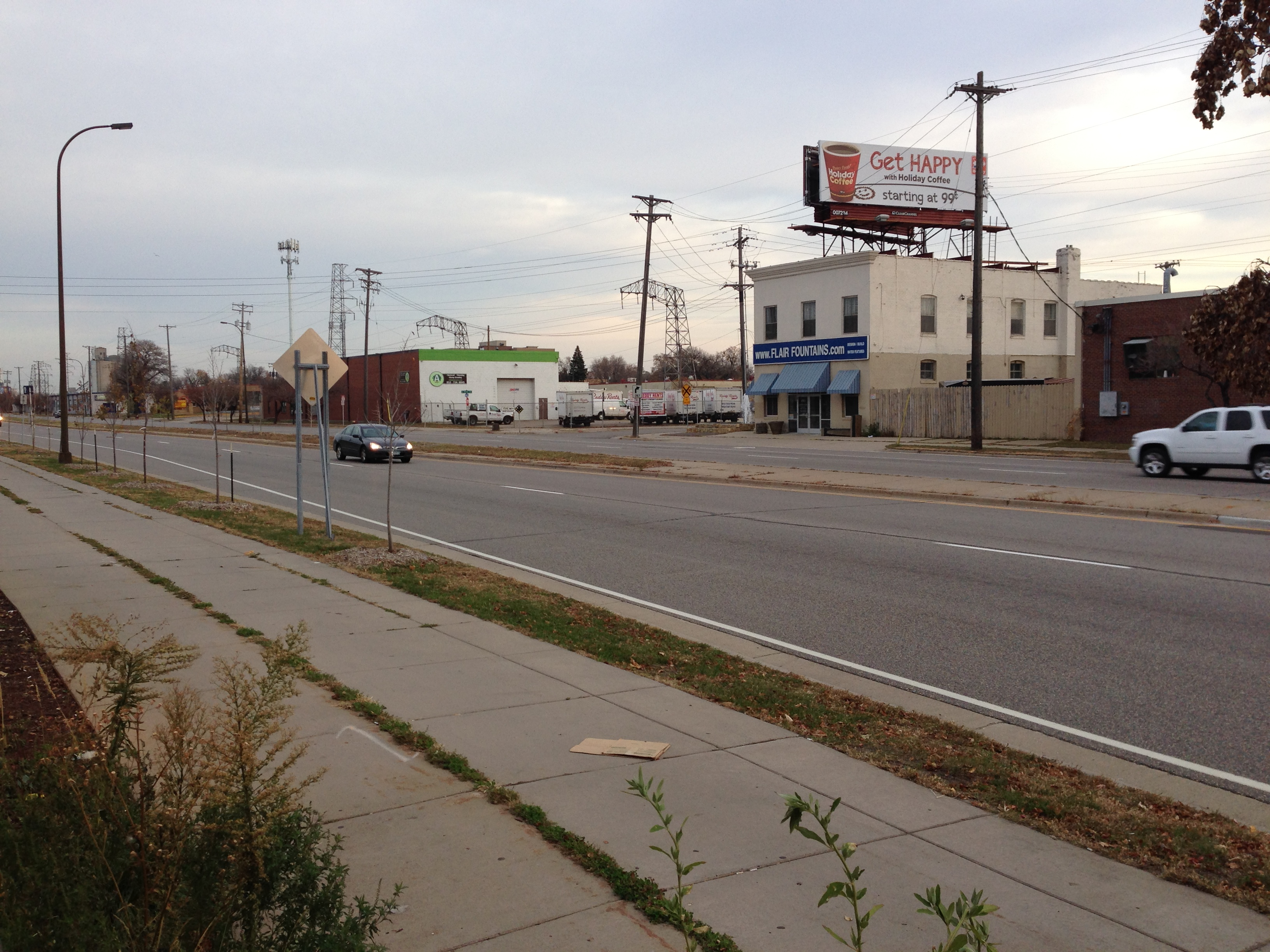
The former Minneapolis Fire Station #24 (the two-story white building) circa 2014.

In 1907, Cheatham and two other Black firefighters, Lafayette Mason and Frank Harris, were assigned to be in charge of Fire Station 24 at Hiawatha Avenue and 45th Street, a racially segregated facility that officials were transitioning to an all-Black firehouse. The station was in middle of a redlined neighborhood that was predominantly White, but it was also adjacent to a railroad yard where many Black labors worked. White firefighters at Fire Station 24, and some nearby residents, initially objected to Black fire fighters being assigned to the station.

Cheatham and the other Black firefighters resisted being replaced by White firefighters at Fire Station 24. Cheatham said about the situation that he was "drawing the color line and drawing it stiff”. After debate by Minneapolis city councilors and support via a petition from White women who lived in the area, the fire station continued with the assignment of Black firefighters. Cheatham worked at the station until his retirement in 1911, after 23 years with the fire department.

The community thought highly of Cheatham during his fire department tenure. His firefighting received praise in the Minneapolis Journal newspaper at the time.

== Personal life ==
Cheatham was married to Susie Cheatham. They owned a home at 3020 20th Avenue in Minneapolis. John and Susie had four children, Ethel, Bertha, Gilbert, and Wesley. Susie Cheatham died in 1906 from typhoid at the age of 46. John Cheatham died on August 15, 1918, at the age of 63, from chronic endocarditis. Cheatham was buried at the Pioneers and Soldiers Memorial Cemetery in Minneapolis alongside other family members.

== Legacy ==
=== Racial integration ===
Cheatham and several other Blacks assigned to Fire Station 24 were the first to racially integrate the Minneapolis Fire Department. From when it opened in 1907 to when it closed in 1941, dozens of Black firefighters served at the station. After its closure, there were no Blacks in the city's fire department for thirty years. The city's fire department was not racially integrated again until 1972 after being ordered to do so by federal judge Earl Larson.

The city sold Fire Station 24 after its closure and it was used by a variety of private industrial businesses. In 2021, several organizations and activists sought historic designation status for the station building.

=== Cheatham Avenue ===
In the aftermath of protests following George Floyd's murder in 2020, honoring Cheatham's legacy was part of a wave of statue removals and official re-designations. In 2021, a petition drive led by disability activist Noah McCourt requested that the City of Minneapolis rename Dight Avenue, a street in the Longfellow community that had been named decades earlier for Charles Fremont Dight for his efforts to promote food safety, but who also advocated for eugenics. The petition obtained 30,000 signatures, according to activists. After consulting with residents on Dight Avenue and offering several options, city officials decided to honor Cheatham's legacy by renaming Dight Avenue after him, with the re-designation taking place on March 17, 2022.

Cheatham Avenue is one of a few named streets in a section of Minneapolis where most streets are numbered. The street runs for 10 blocks on the city's southside, running parallel to Hiawatha Avenue.

== See also ==
- 2020–2021 Minneapolis–Saint Paul racial unrest
- Firefighting in the United States
- History of Minneapolis
- List of name changes due to the George Floyd protests
