= Faribault State Hospital =

- Hospital, State School for the Feeble Minded
- U.S. National Register of Historic Places
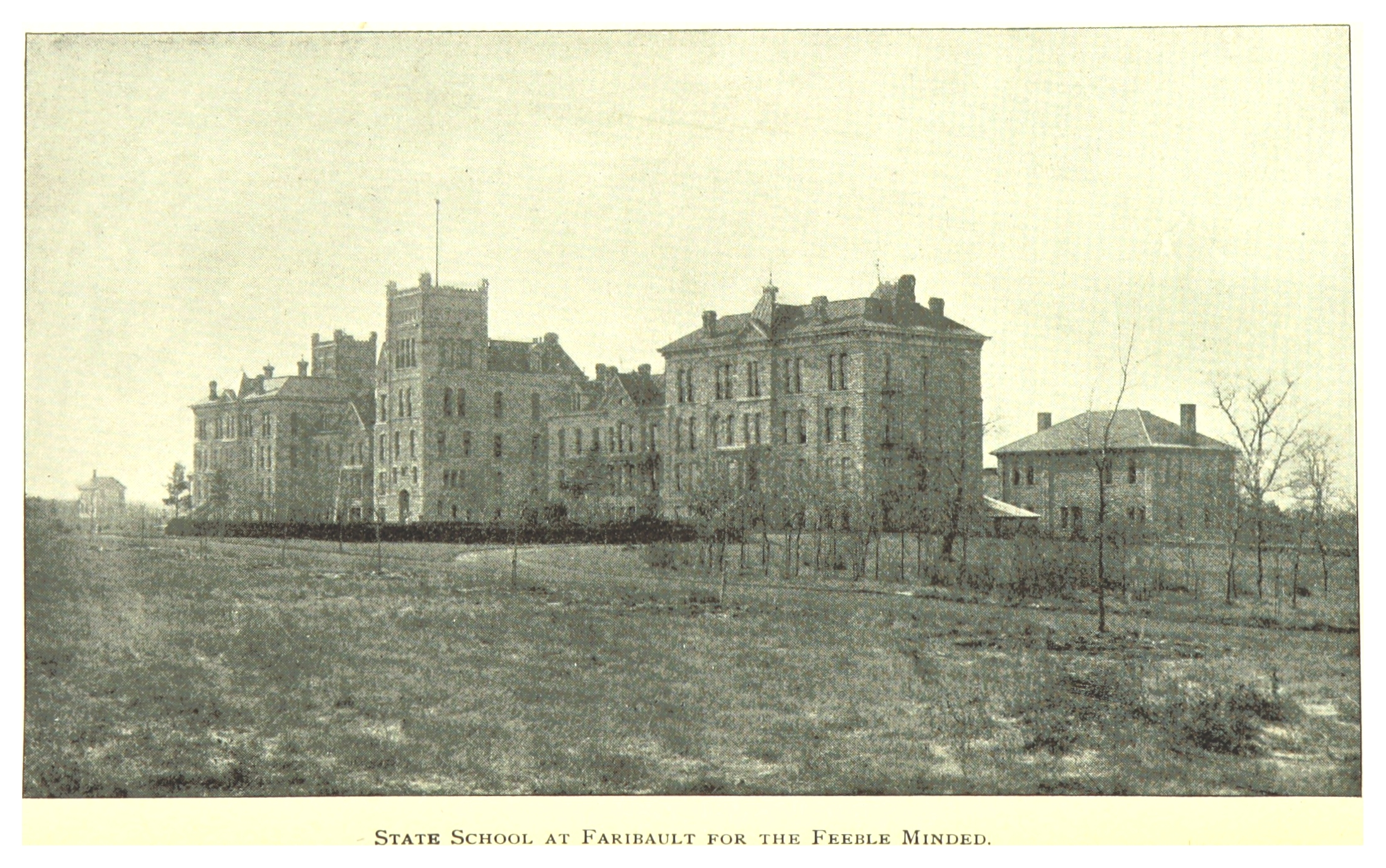
- 1893 photo of the institute's grounds

- Location within Minnesota
- Location: Off 6th Ave., SE, Faribault, Minnesota
- Coordinates: 44°16′56″N 93°15′28″W
- Area: 1.7 acres (0.69 ha)
- Built: 1900
- Architect: Clarence H. Johnston Sr.
- MPS: Rice County MRA
- NRHP reference No.: 82003014
- Added to NRHP: April 6, 1982

Faribault State Hospital was a former hospital for patients with developmental disabilities located in Faribault, Minnesota. The institution was founded in 1879 as the Minnesota Experimental School for Imbeciles.

In 1879, J.L. Noyes, superintendent of the Minnesota Institution for the Deaf and Dumb and the Blind had appealed to the state for an institution to care for intellectually disabled children and youth. In 1882 it expanded its population to 50 students and again grew in 1887 to 303 students. In 1894, the location added a school for girls (130 students) called, "Sunnyside" (later changed to Chippewa). In 1895, the school for girls expanded to 160 and added a zoo and merry-go-arounds on campus (total population 500 in 1896). In 1898 the first psychologist ever employed in an Institution, A.R.T. Wylie, with many publications being written in the Journal of Psycho-Asthenics. In 1900, a 40-bed hospital opened on the location, named the "Oaks", which specialized in the treatment of epileptic boys beginning in 1901 (total population 889 in 1902). By 1904 there were 500 beds for the boys and girls placed in the hospital, and 28 beds for children struggling with tuberculosis were added in 1905.

Due to a number of deaths at the facility, a cemetery was created on the south side of the main campus, with the first residential burial taking place in 1905. The cemetery is still open and cared for by inmates who reside at the facility.

In 1909, 507 acres of farmland in Walcott Township was purchased for expansion of the facilities. In 1913 tunnels (which are still accessible) and ceiling tracks were installed to make deliveries and travel from building-to-building without going outside. Expansions were made every few years, adding new buildings, most of which still exist and are used by staff and inmates. By 1955, the population of the new Faribault State Hospital was 3,355, and 639 staff. In 1968, the working farm on the facility and many buildings were closed due to decreasing population. In 1985, Faribault State Hospital (1970–1985) changed its name to "Faribault Regional Center." In 1987, the Minnesota Legislature authorized a bill for MN Corrections to take over FRC grounds. The model for caring for mentally disadvantaged had changed to a more community-based help and support system.

The Oaks Building, which served as a hospital building and later as a residence, was listed on the National Register of Historic Places due to its association with A.R.T. Wiley, the first clinical psychologist to be employed at an institution for the intellectually disabled. The building was originally intended as a detached hospital for those with contagious diseases, but it also housed classrooms for staff members, photographic and research laboratories, and Wiley's psychological laboratory.

The Faribault State Hospital property is now home to Minnesota Correctional Facility – Faribault, and aerial pictures do not show the building.
