= Minnesota Correctional Facility – Faribault =

Prison in Minnesota, United States

Minnesota Correctional Facility – Faribault (MCF-Faribault)
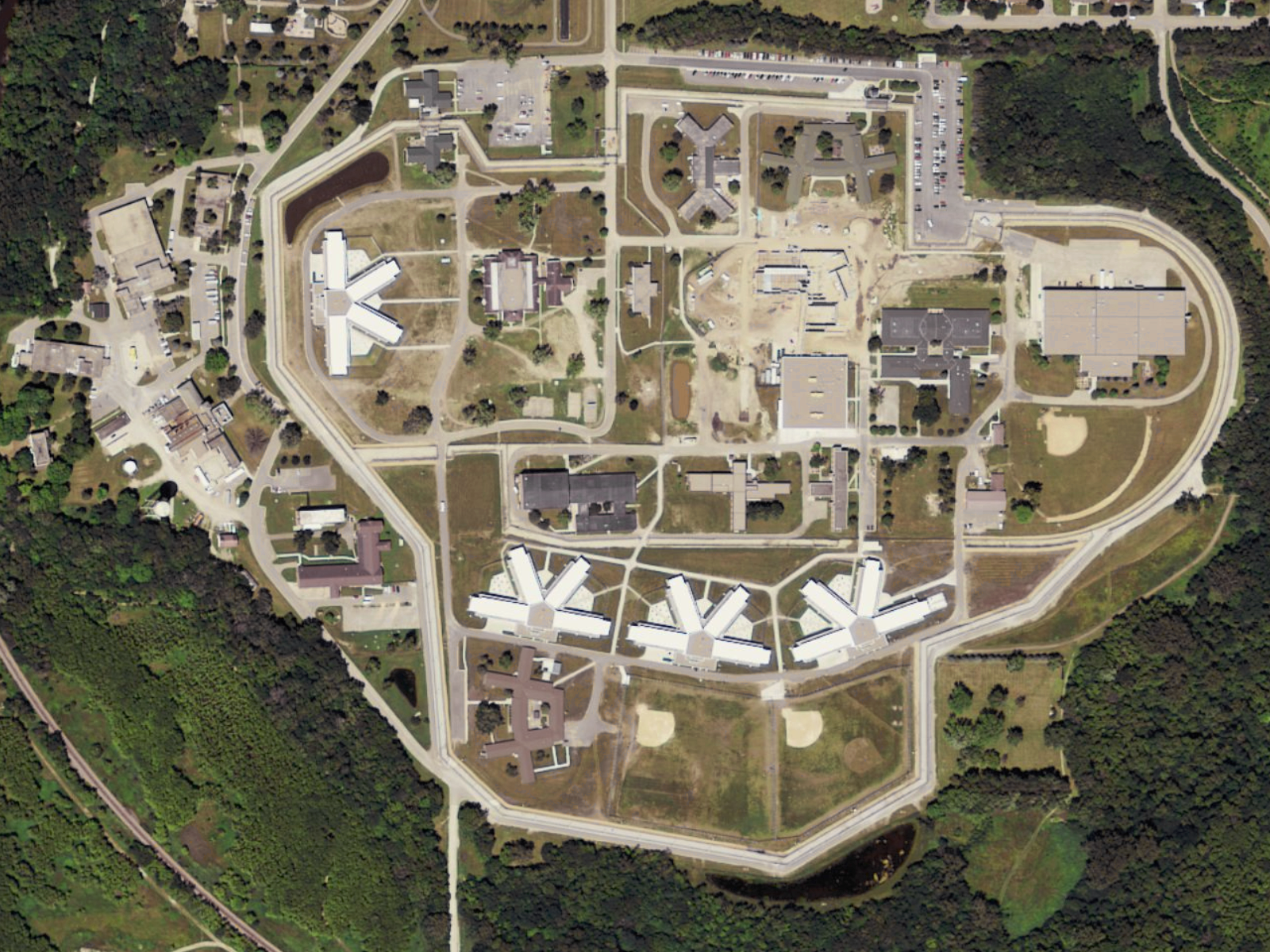
- Interactive map of Minnesota Correctional Facility – Faribault (MCF-Faribault)
- Location: Faribault, Minnesota; 44°16′56″N 93°15′16″W
- Status: Operational
- Security class: minimum(2)–medium(3/4)
- Capacity: 2,005
- Population: 1,973 (March 14, 2023)
- Opened: 1989
- Managed by: Minnesota Department of Corrections
- Warden: Tracy Beltz

The Minnesota Correctional Facility – Faribault is a state prison located in Faribault, Minnesota. As of March 2023, it had an adult inmate population of about 2,000 men, making it the largest prison in Minnesota by population.

The facility is built on land the state has managed and maintained since 1879 when it was founded as, "Minnesota Experimental School for the Feeble Minded."

The prison was officially established in 1989 on the 140-acre (57 ha) campus of the former Faribault State Hospital. Between 2005 and 2008, the Minnesota legislature funded a $129 million expansion and modernization program, which included the construction of four new 416-bed living units. The prison's medium-security inmates are now primarily housed within these four large "K" buildings, so called because each building consists of four wings in a "K" configuration around a central control rotunda, with each two-story wing capable of housing 104 inmates in two-bunk cells.

The expansion of the Faribault prison was a primary cause of the state's decreased reliance upon a private prison in Appleton, Minnesota. Corrections Corporation of America closed the 1,600-bed Appleton prison in 2010.

MCF-Faribault has educational facilities for GED and adult basic education, and provides education in construction trades such as flooring, drywall, and woodworking. Volunteers of America offers Social Justice Clinical Pastoral Education courses for faith leaders, seminarians, and inmates at the prison. The facility also houses a MINNCOR prison industry facility providing contract labor to outside vendors as well as a line of institutional and library furniture. Recently, the facility's 180 bed "New Dimensions" chemical dependency treatment program which provided a 6-12 month treatment program for alcohol and other drug-dependent offenders was changed to a 4-6 month intensive outpatient program currently with about 50 inmates. The minimum security unit, outside of the main prison's medium-security double fence, provides housing and supervision for community work crews.

== Notable inmates ==
- Harvey Carignan - Serial killer.
- Donald Blom - Registered sex offender convicted of the murder of Katie Poirier in 1999.
