= Charles Fremont Dight =

American medical professor and eugenicist (1856–1938)

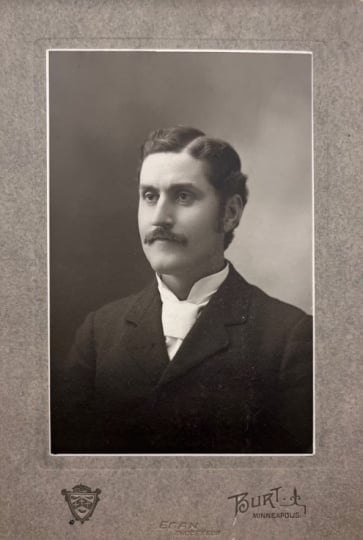
Charles Fremont Dight

Charles Fremont Dight (1856–1938) was an American medical professor and promoter of the human eugenics movement in the U.S. state of Minnesota. Dight Avenue, a street in Minneapolis, was named for him until the city re-designated it as Cheatham Avenue in 2022.

== Biography ==
In 1856, Dight was born in Mercer, Pennsylvania, to parents of Scotch German heritage. He grew up on a farm. Dight married Dr. Mary A. Crawford in 1892, but they divorced in 1899. Dight had no children or heirs. Dight resided in a tree house home dwelling at 4818 39th Avenue in Minneapolis, which has since been demolished.

Dight graduated from the University of Michigan Medical School in 1879. He was a health officer in Holton, Michigan from 1879 to 1881. He then worked at the university under professor Alonzo B. Palmer. Dight taught at the American University of Beirut from 1883 to 1889. Upon returning to the United States, he was the resident physician and teacher of physiology and hygiene at the Shattuck School in Faribault, Minnesota. He later taught at the medical school at Hamline University; the medical school was absorbed into the University of Minnesota in 1907. Dight was a member of the Socialist Party of Minnesota, and was an alderman from the 12th district of Minneapolis from 1914 to 1918. During his time in office, Dight was instrumental in passing an ordinance requiring the pasteurization of milk. He left the Socialist Party in 1917, prior to beginning his eugenics efforts.

Dight became a proponent of eugenics during the 1920s. He founded the Minnesota Eugenics Society in 1923 and persuaded the Minnesota legislature to pass a sterilization law in 1925. Dight actively pursued the same type of eugenics as Nazi medicine. In 1933, Dight wrote a letter to Adolf Hitler praising his efforts to "stamp out mental inferiority". When he died in 1938, Dight gave his estate to the University of Minnesota to create the Dight Institute for Eugenics Research. The institute was renamed the Dight Institute for the Promotion of Human Genetics and was in operation until the late 1960s when it was divested, and it later closed in the 1990s.

In 1918, the Minneapolis city council named a nine-block long street in the Longfellow community "Dight Avenue" for him in recognition of his efforts to promote food safety. The street name drew periodic criticism from the public and by editorial boards of newspapers, such as by the MinnPost in 2016. The legacy of Dight Avenue became part of a wave of statute removals and official re-designations in the aftermath of protests following George Floyd's murder in 2020. In light of his views on eugenics, in 2021 a petition drive led by disability activist Noah McCourt requested that the City of Minneapolis rename the street, which received support from residents and city officials. In 2022, Dight Avenue was renamed after John Cheatham, one of the first Black firefighters in Minneapolis.

== Publications ==
- 1935: History of the Early Stages of the Organized Eugenics Movement for Human Betterment in Minnesota
- 1936: Call for a New Social Order

== See also ==
- 2020–2022 Minneapolis–Saint Paul racial unrest
- List of name changes due to the George Floyd protests
- Nazi eugenics
- Eugenics in Minnesota
