= Ben-Ishmael Tribe =

American group

The names "Ben Ishmael Tribe," and "Tribe of Ishmael", were applied to poor, Upland Southern residents of Indianapolis, Indiana during the late 19th and early 20th century because of their supposed association with the Ishmael family. Records of the Ishmael family show that it originally hailed from Cumberland County, Pennsylvania, and that its patriarch, Benjamin Ishmael, served in the American Continental Army during the Revolutionary War.

The Ishmaels, known locally for abstaining from the wage labor economy in Indianapolis, received attention from eugenics advocates starting in 1877 with the Reverend Oscar McCulloch, and his assistant James Frank Wright. Following McCulloch's published report in 1888 regarding the Tribe of Ishmael, eugenicists such as Charles Estabrook and Harry Laughlin used the family to argue for sterilization laws called the Indiana Plan. The family name was also invoked during Congressional hearings that led to the passage of the Immigration Act of 1924.

After mostly slipping out of national consciousness for much of the 20th century, the history of the Ishmael tribe was radically reinvented by Hugo Prosper Leaming in an essay called The Ben Ishmael Tribe: A Fugitive "Nation" of the Old Northwest. Leaming argued that the family was not simply a poor white Christian family, but actually a Muslim tri-racial sect of Indigenous peoples, Europeans, and enslaved Africans. Much of Leaming's narrative was refuted by the extensively researched 2009 book Inventing America's Worst Family: Eugenics, Islam and the Fall and Rise of the Tribe of Ishmael by Nathaniel Deutsch, a professor of Literature and History at the University of California, Santa Cruz.

== The "Discovery" of the Tribe of Ishmael ==
In 1877, Oscar McCulloch moved to Indianapolis from Sheboygan, Wisconsin to become the minister of the Protestant Plymouth Church. Due to a surging population and an economic crisis known as the Panic of 1873, McCulloch entered Indianapolis during a period of widespread poverty. Many of the urban poor in Indianapolis at the time were migrants from Kentucky, Tennessee, Virginia and other regions of the Upland South. Among these migrants were a family with the surname of Ishmael, who became the subject of a decade-long study for McCulloch. McCulloch recorded in his diary that he was aware of Richard Louis Dugdale's study on "The Jukes," which helped to form his belief that poverty was a hereditary matter, not simply an environmental one.

In July 1888, McCulloch, the president of the Indianapolis Benevolent Society, went public with his finding on the Tribe of Ishmael in a speech entitled The Tribe of Ishmael: A Study in Social Degradation, at the National Conference of Charities and Correction in Buffalo, New York. In this speech, McCulloch compared the family to the Sacculina, a crustacean parasite with an "irresistible hereditary tendency...[which is] a type of degradation through parasitism, or pauperism." These human parasites, McCulloch stated, were draining the city of Indianapolis of its resources and exacerbating their own problems by receiving charity. McCulloch put the number of families in the study at thirty, with the Ishmaels being the "central, the oldest and the most widely ramified family." It appears likely that McCulloch also chose to publicize the Ishmael family due to the name's association to the Orient, of which McCulloch had studied intensely.

The family was described as "tow-headed" or white blond, aside from a "half-breed" (half Native American) mother. The Ishmaels were explained to have "wandering blood", causing them to "'gypsy', or travel in wagons east or west". In addition, the Ishmaels were known for "licentiousness which characterizes the men and women", and their lifestyle was encouraged by "almost unlimited public and private aid". McCulloch claimed that the Ishmael clan had a criminal record of mostly prostitution, thieving, larceny, and even murder, while making up three-fourths of the hospital cases in Indianapolis.

This grim picture was summed up by McCulloch's claim that "they underrun society like devil grass. Pick up one, and the whole five thousand would be drawn up." Due to the "force of heredity", each generation would likely repeat this life of crime and immorality unless the state intervened. McCulloch's solution was three-fold. McCulloch recommended that the government of Indianapolis "close up official out-door relief… check private and indiscriminate benevolence, or charity, falsely so called... [and] get hold of the children." From this case study, McCulloch laid the groundwork for a national obsession with the Ishmael family. Nowhere was the impact of the Ishmael family felt more than in the field of eugenics.

== Importance to the American eugenics movement ==
The story of the Tribe of Ishmael was one of a number of family history case studies in the late 19th and early 20th centuries. Other notable studies included the Jukes, Kallikaks, Nams, Dacks and Wins. In order to complete these studies, field workers from the Eugenics Record Office would interview members of a community that knew individuals of the given family and examine the family's public records.

Eventually pedigree charts were made to determine whether character flaws such as laziness could be deemed hereditary. Between 1915 and 1922, Charles Estabrook, a noted eugenics researcher from the Eugenics Record Office resumed the study of the Ishmael family and was given access to the unpublished notes of McCulloch's assistant, James Frank Wright. Estabrook, like McCulloch and Wright, focused his study, called The Tribe of Ishmael, on the supposed licentiousness and immoral behavior of the "Ishmaelite" family, as well as their annual "gypsying". Estabrook concluded that:

The individuals in this large group of feeble-minded folk are continuing to mate like to like, and are reproducing their own kind. Some few branches of the Tribe have mated into better stocks, but these are so few that they are hardly noticeable. The few placed in orphans' homes and new environments have in some cases done better, but this has not changed the whole mass to any extent. The greater portion are still the cacogenic folk as now found by McCulloch and are breeding true to the type. These germ plasms have now spread through the whole middle west and are continuing to spread the anti-social trait of their germ plasm with no check by society. The story of the Tribe of Ishmael is but another picture of the Kallikaks, the Nams and the Jukes.

Such family history studies of a supposedly degenerate family were one of several factors behind the passage of eugenic sterilization laws. In 1907, Indiana was the first state to pass a law regarding compulsory sterilization. Known as the Indiana Plan, this law banned the feebleminded, the insane, chronic alcoholics, and other "undesirables" from marrying. According to Thurman Rice, who published Racial Hygiene: A Practical Discussion of Eugenics and Race Culture, "To a considerable extent the pre-eminent position taken by the State of Indiana in the matter of eugenical legislation in 1907 can be traced back to his [McCulloch's] studies."

Harry Laughlin, the superintendent of the Eugenics Record Office, invoked the Tribe of Ishmael to caution against unchecked immigration. Laughlin gave a speech in front of the Eugenics Education Society in London and said that England had provided America with "some of the finest stock in the world". However, "we have received also some degenerate stock from the same nation. We should have sorted the human seed more carefully at the border." Laughlin mentioned the Ishmaels, saying "I do not know why they call these people the Ishmaels, but they are very numerous, and we can imagine a significant connotation for the name. America is suffering very much from them, but is waking to its danger. We shall have to provide some practical plan for getting rid of this stock."

Testifying before a House of Representatives Committee on Immigration and Naturalization, Laughlin explained "degenerate families…so common there much be something wrong with them," such as the Jukes and the Ishmaels. After hearing such testimony, the United States Congress eventually passed the Immigration Act of 1924. In 1933, the story of the Tribe of Ishmael was put on display at the 1933 World's Fair in Chicago as a warning against unfit family breeding and the face of the undeserving poor.

== Reinventing the Tribe of Ishmael ==
The Tribe of Ishmael was largely forgotten in American culture, until 1977, one hundred years since their initial "discovery," when a Unitarian minister name Hugo Prosper Leaming radically reinvented the family's history in his essay The Ben Ishmael Tribe: A Fugitive "Nation" of the Old Northwest. Leaming was fascinated by the Ishmael clan, and his reinvention of their narrative coincided with his own radical reinvention, as he too claimed a tri-racial ethnicity and adopted a Muslim faith. Often lacking evidence, Leaming (later known as Hugo Prosper Leaming Bey, a reflection of his newfound Muslim identity) wrote that the family was "a tightly knit nomadic community of African, Native American, and 'poor white descent'", while selectively quoting from the family histories written by McCulloch and Wright. Leaming proclaimed that previous Ishmael campsites formed the "nuclei of present-day black communities, and Ishmaelites of the diaspora participated in the rise of black nationalism, perhaps even contributing memories of African Islam to the new Black Muslim movements."

To back up this assertion, Leaming chose sections of documents regarding the Tribe of Ishmael to make it appear the family regularly engaged in polygamy, went on pilgrimages similar to the Muslim Hajj, had matriarchal "queens," and avoided alcohol - all for religious reasons. In addition, Leaming claimed that before Noble Drew Ali, Master Wallace Fard Muhammad, Elijah Muhammed and Malcolm X, there was Ben Ishmael, an "earlier Islamic saint or Imam," in America. Leaming simultaneously speculated that the "Ben-Ishmael" family name was actually derived from Arabic to mean "ابن اسماعيل" (Ibn Ismail) or "Son of Ishmael," an Islamic reference to Muslims' supposed lineage through Ishmael, son of Abraham, via Muhammad.

Leaming's reinvention of the Ishmael story as a diverse, crypto-Muslim tribe, bridging the gap of "African and American Islam," and comprising a "lost-found nation in the wilderness of North America," was discredited by Nathaniel Deutsch in the book Inventing America's Worst Family: Eugenics, Islam and the Fall and Rise of the Tribe of Ishmael.

Deutsch concluded that although much of the fascination with the Tribe of Ishmael has roots in American interest in Islam and the Orient, there is no reason to believe the Ishmael family was, in terms of economic standing and religion, anything but a poor Christian family targeted by eugenics researchers. Nevertheless, in terms of race and ethnic origins, Deutsch also concluded that several of the Ishmaels were mixed-race African Americans and that some of the families identified as Ishmaelites may have been Travellers.

Michael Muhammad Knight has talked about the Ben Ishmael Tribe extensively in books Blue-Eyed Devil and Journey to the End of Islam, where he travels to Indiana and Illinois to visit Mecca, Indiana, Morocco, Indiana, and Mahomet, Illinois in order to learn more about the Ben Ishmael Tribe. His former mentor, Peter Lamborn Wilson introduced him to the history of the Ben Ishmael Tribe and influenced his interest in the group.

== See also ==
- Anti-Romani sentiment
- Brandywine people
  - Piscataway Indian Nation and Tayac Territory
  - Piscataway-Conoy Tribe of Maryland
- Brass Ankles
  - Wassamasaw Tribe of Varnertown Indians
- Chestnut Ridge people
- Delaware Moors
  - Lenape Indian Tribe of Delaware
  - Nanticoke Indian Association
  - Nanticoke Lenni-Lenape Tribal Nation
- Dominickers
- Eugenics in the United States
- Lumbee
  - Lumbee Tribe of North Carolina
- Melungeons
  - Carmel Melungeons
- Piney (Pine Barrens resident)
- Ramapough Mountain People
- Redbones
