= History of eugenics =

History of efforts to improve human genetic quality

The history of eugenics is the study of development and advocacy of ideas related to eugenics around the world. Early eugenic ideas were discussed in Ancient Greece and Rome. The height of the modern eugenics movement came in the late 19th and early 20th centuries.

== Ancient eugenics ==
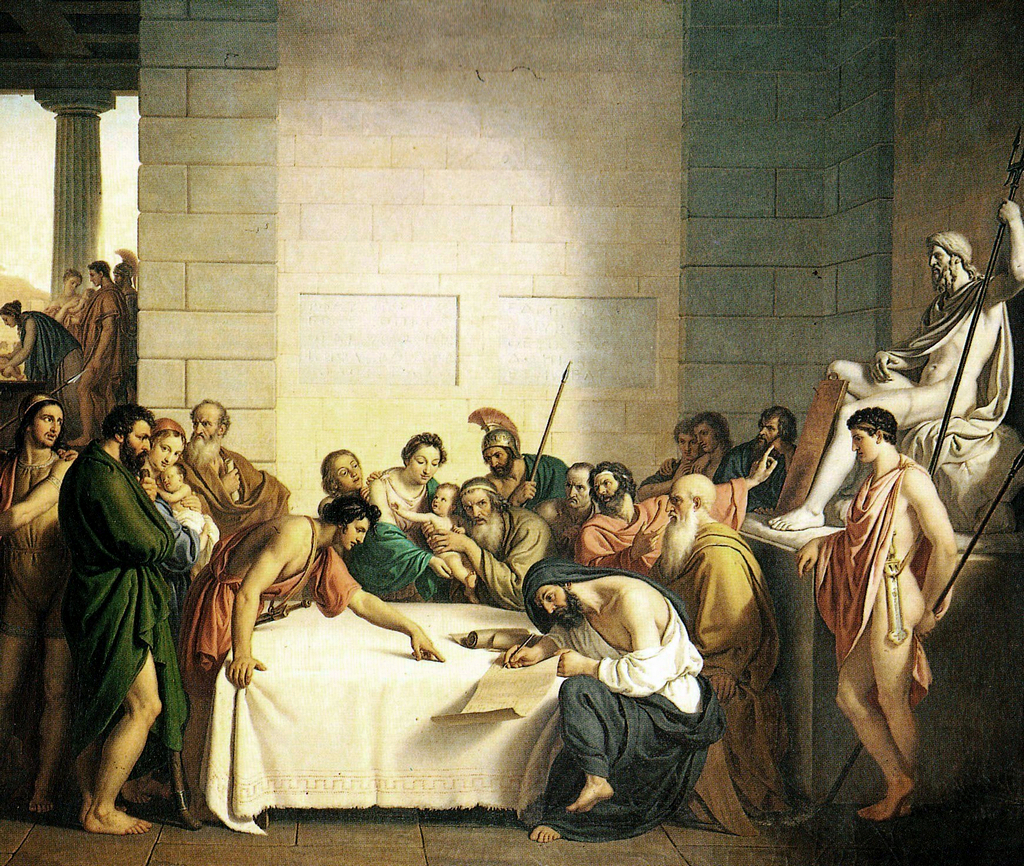
Giuseppe Diotti's The selection of the infant Spartans (1840)

According to Plutarch, in Sparta every proper citizen's child was inspected by the council of elders, the Gerousia, which determined whether or not the child was fit to live. If the child was deemed unfit, the child was thrown into a chasm. Plutarch is the sole historical source for the Spartan practice of systemic infanticide motivated by eugenics. While infanticide was practiced by Greeks, no contemporary sources support Plutarch's claims of mass infanticide motivated by eugenics. In 2007 the suggestion that infants were dumped near Mount Taygete was called into question due to a lack of physical evidence. Anthropologist Theodoros Pitsios' research found only bodies from adolescents up to the age of approximately 35.

Plato's political philosophy included the belief that human reproduction should be cautiously monitored and controlled by the state through selective breeding.

According to Tacitus (c. 56 – c. 120), a Roman of the Imperial Period, the Germanic tribes of his day killed any member of their community they deemed cowardly, unwarlike or "stained with abominable vices", usually by drowning them in swamps. Modern historians see Tacitus' ethnographic writing as unreliable in such details.

== Rediscovery ==
=== Socio-cultural backdrop of the time ===
Another question entirely is why eugenics rose, and did so in ways whose complexity still grounds a highly active field of study in intellectual history today.

==== The Malthusian component ====
In 1798, Thomas Malthus proposed his hypothesis in An Essay on the Principle of Population.

He argued that although human populations tend to increase, the happiness of a country requires a like increase in food production. "The happiness of a country does not depend, absolutely, upon its poverty, or its riches, upon its youth, or its age, upon its being thinly, or fully inhabited, but upon the rapidity with which it is increasing, upon the degree in which the yearly increase of food approaches to the yearly increase of an unrestricted population."

However, the propensity for population increase also leads to a natural cycle of abundance and shortages:

We will suppose the means of subsistence in any country just equal to the easy support of its inhabitants. The constant effort towards population ... increases the number of people before the means of subsistence are increased. The food therefore which before supported seven millions, must now be divided among seven millions and a half or eight millions. The poor consequently must live much worse, and many of them be reduced to severe distress. The number of labourers also being above the proportion of the work in the market, the price of labour must tend toward a decrease; while the price of provisions would at the same time tend to rise. The labourer therefore must work harder to earn the same as he did before. During this season of distress, the discouragements to marriage, and the difficulty of rearing a family are so great, that population is at a stand. In the mean time the cheapness of labour, the plenty of labourers, and the necessity of an increased industry amongst them, encourage cultivators to employ more labour upon their land; to turn up fresh soil, and to manure and improve more completely what is already in tillage; till ultimately the means of subsistence become in the same proportion to the population as at the period from which we set out. The situation of the labourer being then again tolerably comfortable, the restraints to population are in some degree loosened; and the same retrograde and progressive movements with respect to happiness are repeated.

— Thomas Malthus, 1798. An Essay on the Principle of Population, Chapter II.

Famine seems to be the last, the most dreadful resource of nature. The power of population is so superior to the power of the earth to produce subsistence for man, that premature death must in some shape or other visit the human race. The vices of mankind are active and able ministers of depopulation. They are the precursors in the great army of destruction, and often finish the dreadful work themselves. But should they fail in this war of extermination, sickly seasons, epidemics, pestilence, and plague advance in terrific array, and sweep off their thousands and tens of thousands. Should success be still incomplete, gigantic inevitable famine stalks in the rear, and with one mighty blow levels the population with the food of the world.

— Thomas Malthus, 1798. An Essay on the Principle of Population. Chapter VII, p. 61

Malthus faced opposition from economists both during his life and since. A vocal critic several decades later was Friedrich Engels.

==== The Lamarckian component ====
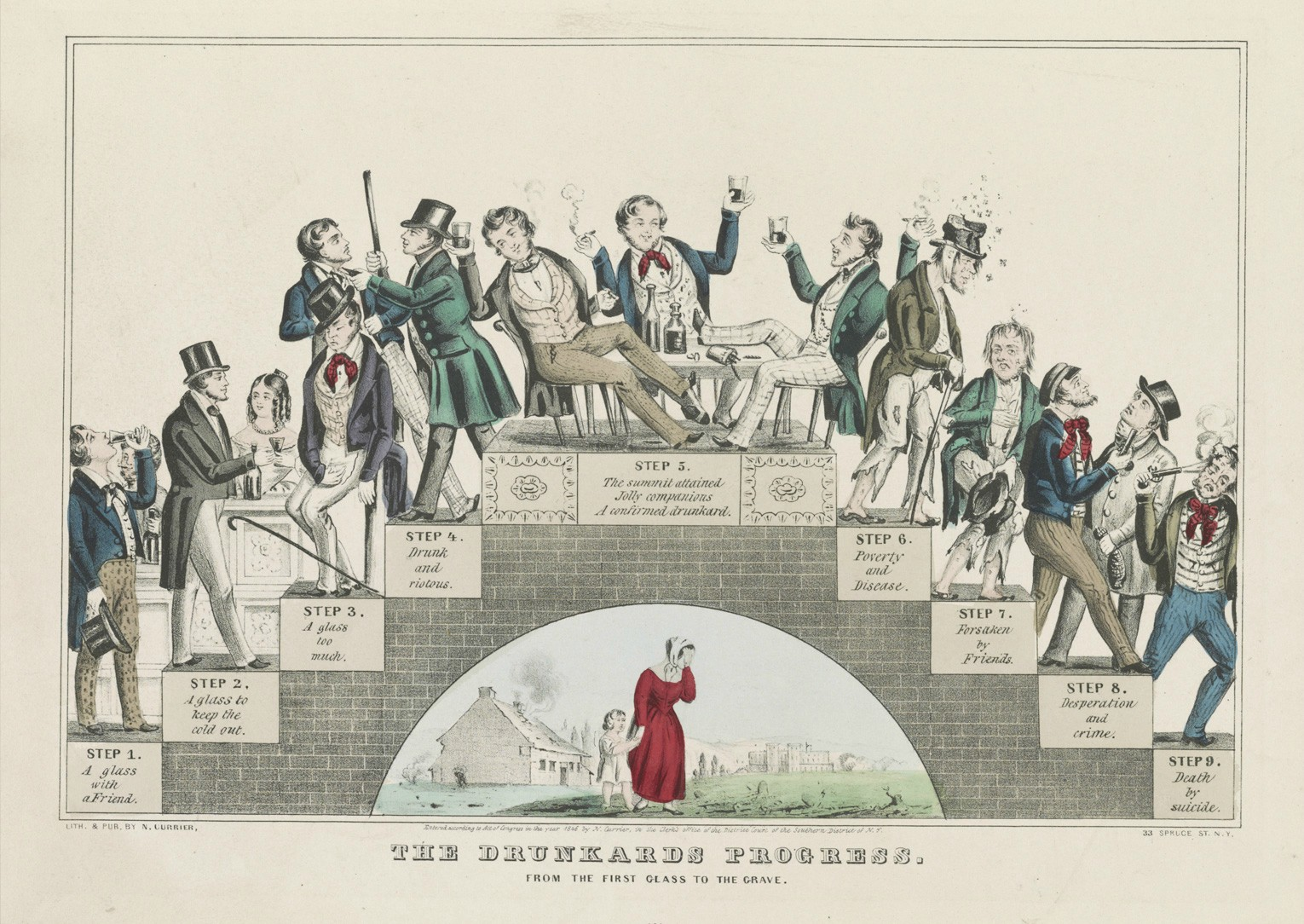
Morel claimed that environmental factors such as drugs or alcohol would revert one's offspring to an evolutionarily more primitive stage.

The idea of progress was at once a social, political and scientific theory. The theory of evolution, as described in Darwin's The Origin of Species, provided for many social theorists the necessary scientific foundation for the idea of social and political progress. The terms evolution and progress were often used interchangeably in the 19th century.

According to the theory of degeneration, a host of individual and social pathologies in a finite network of diseases, disorders and moral habits could be explained by a biologically based affliction. The primary symptoms of the affliction were thought to be a weakening of the vital forces and willpower of its victim. In this way, a wide range of social and medical deviations, including crime, violence, alcoholism, prostitution, gambling, and pornography, could be explained by reference to a biological defect within the individual. The theory of degeneration was therefore predicated on evolutionary theory. The forces of degeneration opposed those of evolution, and those afflicted with degeneration were thought to represent a return to an earlier evolutionary stage.

==== The Darwinian component ====
Dysgenics refers to any decrease in the prevalence of traits deemed to be either socially desirable or generally adaptive to their environment due to selective pressure disfavouring their reproduction.

In 1915, the term was used by David Starr Jordan to describe the supposed deleterious effects of modern warfare on group-level genetic fitness because of its tendency to kill physically healthy men while preserving the disabled at home. Similar concerns had been raised by early eugenicists and social Darwinists during the 19th century, and continued to play a role in scientific and public policy debates throughout the 20th century.

More recent concerns about supposed dysgenic effects in human populations were advanced by the controversial psychologist and self-described scientific racist Richard Lynn, notably in his 1996 book Dysgenics: Genetic Deterioration in Modern Populations, which argued that changes in selection pressures and decreased infant mortality since the Industrial Revolution have resulted in an increased propagation of deleterious traits and genetic disorders.

Despite these concerns, genetic studies have shown no evidence for dysgenic effects in human populations. Reviewing Lynn's book, the scholar John R. Wilmoth notes: "Overall, the most puzzling aspect of Lynn's alarmist position is that the deterioration of average intelligence predicted by the eugenicists has not occurred."

=== Galton's theory ===
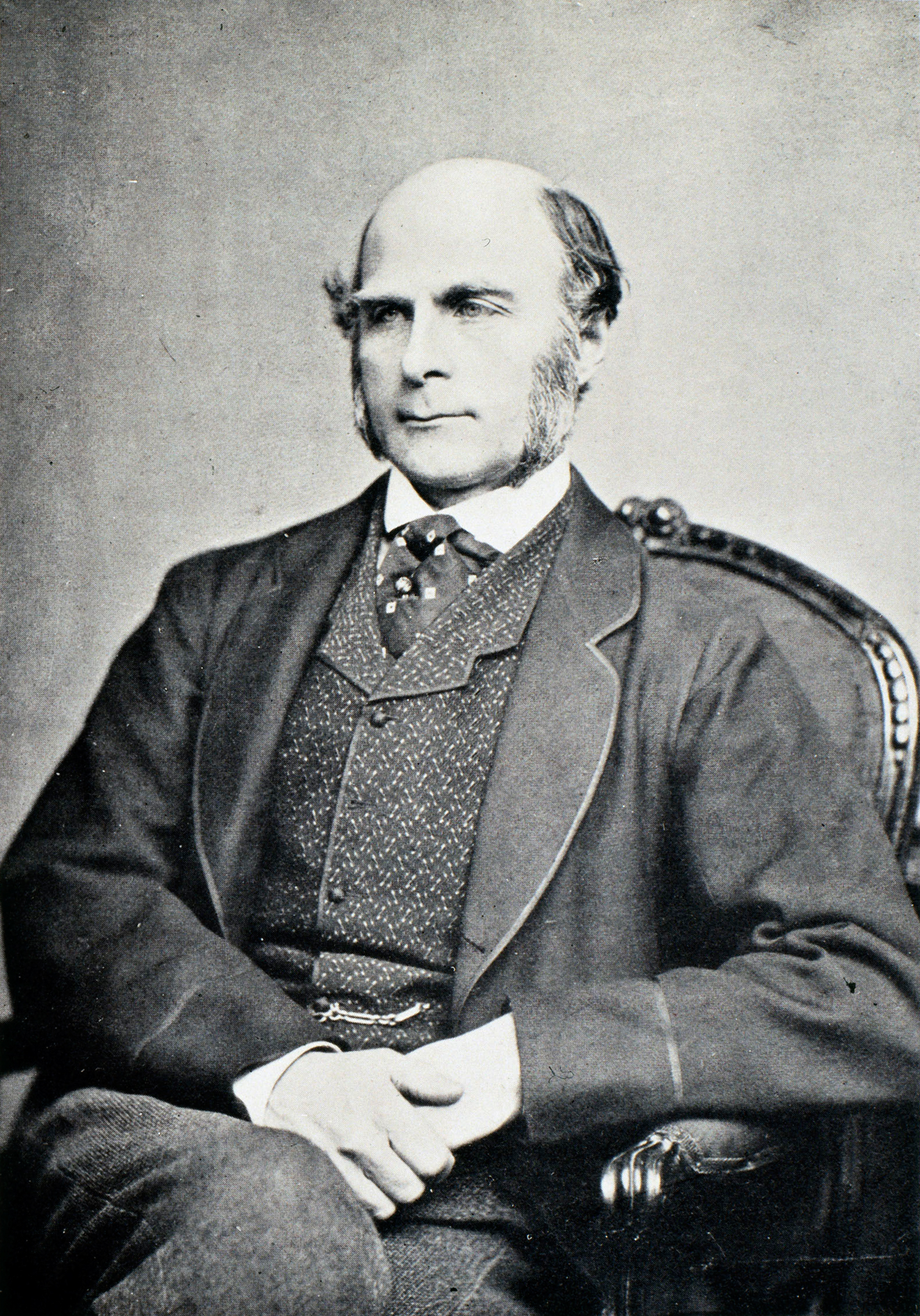
Sir Francis Galton initially developed the ideas of eugenics using social statistics.

Sir Francis Galton (1822–1911) systematized these ideas and practices according to new knowledge about the evolution of man and animals provided by the theory of his half-cousin Charles Darwin during the 1860s and 1870s. After reading Darwin's Origin of Species, Galton built upon Darwin's ideas whereby the mechanisms of natural selection were potentially thwarted by human civilization. He reasoned that, since many human societies sought to protect the underprivileged and weak, those societies were at odds with the natural selection responsible for extinction of the weakest, and only by changing these social policies could society be saved from a "reversion towards mediocrity", a phrase he first coined in statistics and which later changed to the now-common "regression towards the mean". (Incidentally, Galton also coined the phrase "nature versus nurture".)

Galton first sketched out his theory in the 1865 article "Hereditary Talent and Character", then elaborated further in his 1869 book Hereditary Genius. He began by studying the way in which human intellectual, moral, and personality traits tended to run in families. Galton's basic argument was that "genius" and "talent" were hereditary traits in humans, although neither he nor Darwin yet had a working model of this type of heredity. He concluded that, since one could use artificial selection to exaggerate traits in other animals, one could expect similar results when applying such models to humans. As he wrote in the introduction to Hereditary Genius:

I propose to show in this book that a man's natural abilities are derived by inheritance, under exactly the same limitations as are the form and physical features of the whole organic world. Consequently, as it is easy, notwithstanding those limitations, to obtain by careful selection a permanent breed of dogs or horses gifted with peculiar powers of running, or of doing anything else, so it would be quite practicable to produce a highly gifted race of men by judicious marriages during several consecutive generations.

Galton claimed that the less intelligent were more fertile than the more intelligent of his time. Galton did not propose any selection methods; rather, he hoped a solution would be found if social mores changed in a way that encouraged people to see the importance of breeding. He first used the word eugenic in his 1883 Inquiries into Human Faculty and Its Development, a book in which he meant "to touch on various topics more or less connected with that of the cultivation of race, or, as we might call it, with 'eugenic' questions". He included a footnote to the word "eugenic" which read:

That is, with questions bearing on what is termed in Greek, eugenes namely, good in stock, hereditary endowed with noble qualities. This, and the allied words, eugeneia, etc., are equally applicable to men, brutes, and plants. We greatly want a brief word to express the science of improving stock, which is by no means confined to questions of judicious mating, but which, especially in the case of man, takes cognizance of all influences that tend in however remote a degree to give to the more suitable races or strains of blood a better chance of prevailing speedily over the less suitable than they otherwise would have had. The word eugenics would sufficiently express the idea; it is at least a neater word and a more generalized one than viriculture which I once ventured to use.

In 1908, in Memories of my Life, Galton defined eugenics as "the study of agencies under social control that may improve or impair the racial qualities of future generations, either physically or mentally", a definition agreed in consultation with a committee that included the biometrician Karl Pearson. It was slightly at odds with Galton's preferred definition, given in a lecture to the newly formed Sociological Society at the London School of Economics in 1904: "the science which deals with all influences that improve the inborn qualities of a race; also with those that develop them to the utmost advantage". The latter definition, which encompassed nurture and environment as well as heredity, was favoured by broadly left-wing, liberal elements of the ensuing ideological divide.

Galton's formulation of eugenics was based on a strong statistical approach, influenced heavily by Adolphe Quetelet's "social physics". Unlike Quetelet, Galton did not exalt the "average man" but decried him as mediocre. Galton and his statistical heir Karl Pearson developed what was called the biometrical approach to eugenics, which developed new and complex statistical models (later exported to wholly different fields) to describe the heredity of traits. However, with the rediscovery of Gregor Mendel's laws of heredity, two separate camps of eugenics advocates emerged, one of statisticians, the other of biologists. Statisticians thought the biologists had exceptionally crude mathematical models, while biologists thought the statisticians knew little about biology.

Eugenics eventually referred to human selective reproduction with an intent to create children with desirable traits, generally through the approach of influencing differential birth rates. These policies were mostly divided into two categories: positive eugenics, the increased reproduction of those seen to have advantageous hereditary traits; and negative eugenics, the discouragement of reproduction by those with hereditary traits perceived as poor. Negative eugenic policies in the past have ranged from paying those deemed to have bad genes to voluntarily undergo sterilization, attempts at segregation, compulsory sterilization, and even genocide. Positive eugenic policies have typically taken the form of awards or bonuses for "fit" parents who have another child. Relatively innocuous practices such as marriage counseling had early links with eugenic ideology. Eugenics is superficially related to what later became known as Social Darwinism. While both claimed intelligence was hereditary, eugenics asserted new policies were needed to actively change the status quo towards a more "eugenic" state, while the Social Darwinists argued that society itself would naturally "check" the problem of "dysgenics" if no welfare policies were in place—for example, the poor might reproduce more but would have higher mortality rates.

=== Charles Davenport ===
Charles Davenport (1866–1944), a scientist from the United States, stands out as one of history's leading eugenicists. He took eugenics from a scientific idea to a worldwide movement implemented in many countries. Davenport obtained funding from the Carnegie Institution, to establish the Station for Experimental Evolution at Cold Spring Harbor in 1904 and the Eugenics Records Office in 1910, which provided the scientific basis for later Eugenic policies such as enforced sterilization. He was instrumental in building the International Federation of Eugenics Organizations (IFEO) in 1925, and became its first president. While Davenport was located at Cold Spring Harbor and received money from the Carnegie Institute of Washington, the organization known as the Eugenics Record Office (ERO) started to become an embarrassment after the well-known debates between Davenport and Franz Boas. Davenport continued to occupy the same office and the same address at Cold Spring Harbor, but his organization now became known as the Cold Spring Harbor Laboratories, which currently retains the archives of the Eugenics Record Office. However, Davenport's racist views were not supported by all geneticists at Cold Spring Harbor, including H. J. Muller, Bentley Glass, and Esther Lederberg.

In 1932, Davenport welcomed Ernst Rüdin, a prominent Swiss eugenicist and race scientist, as his successor in the position of President of the IFEO. Rüdin, director of the Deutsche Forschungsgemeinschaft (German Research Institute for Psychiatry), a Kaiser Wilhelm Institute located in Munich, was a co-founder (with his brother-in-law Alfred Ploetz) of the German Society for Racial Hygiene. Ploetz recommended a "racial hygiene" system in which panels of physicians decided whether to grant individuals citizenship or euthanasia. Other prominent figures in eugenics who were associated with Davenport included Harry Laughlin (United States), Havelock Ellis (United Kingdom), Irving Fischer (United States), Eugen Fischer (Germany), Madison Grant (United States), Lucien Howe (United States), and Margaret Sanger (United States, founder of a New York health clinic that later became Planned Parenthood, and who commissioned the first birth control pill).

== In government policy ==
=== United Kingdom ===
Galton's view of the British class structure was the basis and emphasis of the eugenics movement in Britain.

In September 1903, an "Inter-departmental Committee on Physical Deterioration" chaired by Almeric W. FitzRoy was appointed by the government "to make a preliminary enquiry into the allegations concerning the deterioration of certain classes of the population as shown by the large percentage of rejections for physical causes of recruits for the Army", and gave its Report to both houses of parliament in the following year. Among its recommendations, originating from professor Daniel John Cunningham, were an anthropometric survey of the British population. The Catholic church was opposed to eugenics, as illustrated in the writings of Father Thomas John Gerrard.

Eugenics was supported by many prominent figures of different political persuasions before World War I (and as positive eugenics after the War), including: Liberal economists William Beveridge and John Maynard Keynes; Fabian socialists such as the Irish author George Bernard Shaw, H. G. Wells, Havelock Ellis, Beatrice Webb and Sidney Webb and other literary figures such as D. H. Lawrence; and Conservatives such as the future Prime Minister Winston Churchill and Arthur Balfour. The influential economist John Maynard Keynes was a prominent supporter of eugenics, serving as Director of the British Eugenics Society, and writing that eugenics is "the most important, significant and, I would add, genuine branch of sociology which exists".

Francis Galton explained during a lecture in 1901 the groupings which are shown in the opening figure and indicated the proportion of society falling into each group, along with their perceived genetic worth. Galton suggested that negative eugenics (i.e. an attempt to prevent them from bearing offspring) should be applied only to those in the lowest social group (the "Undesirables"), while positive eugenics applied to the higher classes. However, he appreciated the worth of the higher working classes to society and industry.

The 1913 Mental Deficiency Act proposed the mass segregation of the "feeble minded" from the rest of society. Sterilisation programmes were never legalised, although some were carried out in private upon the mentally ill by clinicians who were in favour of a more widespread eugenics plan. The Act, however, enabled the formation of residential schools for the "feeble minded" by social workers such as Mary Dendy.

Those in support of eugenics shifted their lobbying of Parliament from enforced to voluntary sterilization, in the hope of achieving more legal recognition. In 1931, Labour Party Member of Parliament Major A. G. Church, proposed a Private Member's Bill to legalise the operation for voluntary sterilization. This was rejected by 167 votes to 89. In 1934, the Brock Report of the Departmental Committee on Sterilisation recommended sterilisation of disabled people but the Report's recommendations were not followed by changes to the law.

Two universities (University College London and Liverpool University) established courses on eugenics. The Galton Institute, affiliated to UCL, was headed by Galton's protégé, Karl Pearson.

In 2008, the British Parliament passed a law prohibiting couples from choosing deaf and disabled embryos for implantation.

=== United States ===
One of the earliest modern advocates of eugenics (before it was labeled as such) was Alexander Graham Bell. In 1881 Bell investigated the rate of deafness on Martha's Vineyard, Massachusetts. From this he concluded that deafness was hereditary in nature and, through noting that congenitally deaf parents were more likely to produce deaf children, tentatively suggested that couples where both were deaf should not marry, in his lecture Memoir upon the formation of a deaf variety of the human race presented to the National Academy of Sciences on 13 November 1883. However, it was his hobby of livestock breeding which led to his appointment to biologist David Starr Jordan's Committee on Eugenics, under the auspices of the American Breeders' Association (ABA). The committee unequivocally extended the principle to humans.

Another scientist considered the "father of the American eugenics movement" was Charles Benedict Davenport. In 1904 he secured funding for the Station for Experimental Evolution, later renamed the Carnegie Department of Genetics. It was also around that time that Davenport became actively involved with the ABA. This led to Davenport's first eugenics text, "The science of human improvement by better breeding", one of the first papers to connect agriculture and human heredity. Davenport later went on to set up a Eugenics Record Office (ERO), collecting hundreds of thousands of medical histories from Americans, which many considered to have a racist and anti-immigration agenda. Davenport and his views were supported at Cold Spring Harbor Laboratory as late as 1963, when his views began to be de-emphasized.

As the science continued in the 20th century, researchers interested in familial mental disorders conducted a number of studies to document the heritability of such illnesses as schizophrenia, bipolar disorder, and depression. Their findings were used by the eugenics movement as proof for its cause. State laws were written in the late 19th and early 20th centuries to prohibit marriage and force sterilization of the mentally ill in order to prevent the "passing on" of mental illness to the next generation. These laws were upheld by the U.S. Supreme Court in 1927 and were not abolished until the mid-20th century. All in all, 60,000 Americans were sterilized.

Michigan became the first state to introduce a compulsory sterilization bill on May 16, 1897. However, the law did not pass. The proposed law, which called for the mandatory castration of defined types of criminals and "degenerates," fails to pass in the legislature but sets a precedent for similar laws. In 1907 Indiana became the first of more than thirty states to adopt legislation aimed at compulsory sterilization of certain individuals. Although the law was overturned by the Indiana Supreme Court in 1921, the U.S. Supreme Court upheld the constitutionality of a Virginia law allowing for the compulsory sterilization of patients of state mental institutions in 1927.

Beginning with Connecticut in 1896, many states enacted marriage laws with eugenic criteria, prohibiting anyone who was "epileptic, imbecile or feeble-minded" from marrying. In 1898 Charles B. Davenport, a prominent American biologist, began as director of a biological research station based in Cold Spring Harbor where he experimented with evolution in plants and animals. In 1904 Davenport received funds from the Carnegie Institution to found the Station for Experimental Evolution. The Eugenics Record Office (ERO) opened in 1910 while Davenport and Harry H. Laughlin began to promote eugenics.

W. E. B. Du Bois maintained the basic principle of eugenics: that different persons have different inborn characteristics that make them more or less suited for specific kinds of employment, and that by encouraging the most talented members of all races to procreate would better the "stocks" of humanity.

The Immigration Restriction League (founded in 1894) was the first American entity associated officially with eugenics. The League sought to bar what it considered dysgenic members of certain races from entering America and diluting what it saw as the superior American racial stock through procreation. They lobbied for a literacy test for immigrants, based on the belief that literacy rates were low among "inferior races". Literacy test bills were vetoed by President William McKinley in 1897 and by President Woodrow Wilson in 1913 and 1915; eventually, President Wilson's second veto was overruled by Congress in 1917. Membership in the League included: A. Lawrence Lowell, president of Harvard University, William DeWitt Hyde, president of Bowdoin College, James T. Young, director of Wharton School, and David Starr Jordan, president of Stanford University. The League allied themselves with the American Breeder's Association to gain influence and further its goals and in 1909 established a eugenics committee chaired by David Starr Jordan with members Charles Davenport, Alexander Graham Bell, Vernon Kellogg, Luther Burbank, William Earnest Castle, Adolf Meyer, H. J. Webber and Friedrich Woods. The ABA's immigration legislation committee, formed in 1911 and headed by League's founder Prescott F. Hall, formalized the committee's already strong relationship with the Immigration Restriction League.

In years to come, the ERO collected a mass of family pedigrees and concluded that those who were unfit came from economically and socially poor backgrounds. Eugenicists such as Davenport, the psychologist Henry H. Goddard and the conservationist Madison Grant (all well respected in their time) began to lobby for various solutions to the problem of the "unfit". (Davenport favored immigration restriction and sterilization as primary methods; Goddard favored segregation in his The Kallikak Family; Grant favored all of the above and more, even entertaining the idea of extermination.) Though their methodology and research methods are now understood as highly flawed, at the time this was seen as legitimate scientific research. It did, however, have scientific detractors (notably, Thomas Hunt Morgan, one of the few Mendelians to explicitly criticize eugenics), though most of these focused more on what they considered the crude methodology of eugenicists, and the characterization of almost every human characteristic as being hereditary, rather than the idea of eugenics itself.

Some states sterilized "imbeciles" for much of the 20th century. The U.S. Supreme Court ruled in the 1927 Buck v. Bell case that the state of Virginia could sterilize individuals under the Virginia Sterilization Act of 1924, with Carrie Buck being brought into the case without her consent as an institutional pawn, the lawsuit being engineered as a test case by Dr. Albert Sidney Priddy. A relevant proponent and contributor to the case, Oliver Wendell Holmes Jr. argued that if the state is able to sacrifice the lives of their citizens in war by Conscription, and if vaccination could be mandated upon the citizens to prevent the spread of disease, then the state should also be able to demand sterilization from its citizens.

Despite the fact that a subsequent case, Skinner v. Oklahoma ruled that compulsory sterilization could not be used as a punishment for crimes and declaring that the right to have children is a fundamental right, it did not entirely overturn Buck v. Bell. Buck v. Bell was not framed under the guise of crime and punishment but rather under the guise of public health and mental competence "Three generations of imbeciles are enough." Even with the decline of state-sanctioned sterilization programs the U.S. Supreme Court has never formally or explicitly overturned the specific Buck v. Bell decision, indicating that this legal precedent technically remains legal.

The most significant era of eugenic sterilization was between 1907 and 1963, when over 64,000 individuals were forcibly sterilized under eugenics legislation in the United States. A favorable report on the results of sterilization in California, the state with the most sterilizations by far, was published in book form by the biologist Paul Popenoe and was widely cited by the Nazi government as evidence that wide-reaching sterilization programs were feasible and humane.

Such legislation was passed in the U.S. because of widespread public acceptance of the eugenics movement, spearheaded by efforts of progressive reformers. Over 19 million people attended the Panama-Pacific International Exposition in San Francisco, open for 10 months from February 20 to December 4, 1915. The PPIE was a fair devoted to extolling the virtues of a rapidly progressing nation, featuring new developments in science, agriculture, manufacturing and technology. A subject that received a large amount of time and space was that of the developments concerning health and disease, particularly the areas of tropical medicine and race betterment (tropical medicine being the combined study of bacteriology, parasitology and entomology while racial betterment being the promotion of eugenic studies). Having these areas so closely intertwined, it seemed that they were both categorized in the main theme of the fair, the advancement of civilization. Thus in the public eye, the seemingly contradictory areas of study were both represented under progressive banners of improvement and were made to seem like plausible courses of action to better American society.

The state of California was at the vanguard of the American eugenics movement, performing about 20,000 sterilizations or one-third of the 60,000 nationwide from 1909 up until the 1960s. By 1910, there was a large and dynamic network of scientists, reformers and professionals engaged in national eugenics projects and actively promoting eugenic legislation. The American Breeder's Association was the first eugenic body in the U.S., established in 1906 under the direction of biologist Charles B. Davenport. The ABA was formed specifically to "investigate and report on heredity in the human race, and emphasize the value of superior blood and the menace to society of inferior blood". Membership included Alexander Graham Bell, Stanford president David Starr Jordan and Luther Burbank.

When Nazi administrators went on trial for war crimes in Nuremberg after World War II, they attempted to justify the mass sterilizations (over 450,000 in less than a decade) by citing the United States as their inspiration. The Nazis had claimed American eugenicists inspired and supported Hitler's racial purification laws, and failed to understand the connection between those policies and the eventual genocide of the Holocaust.

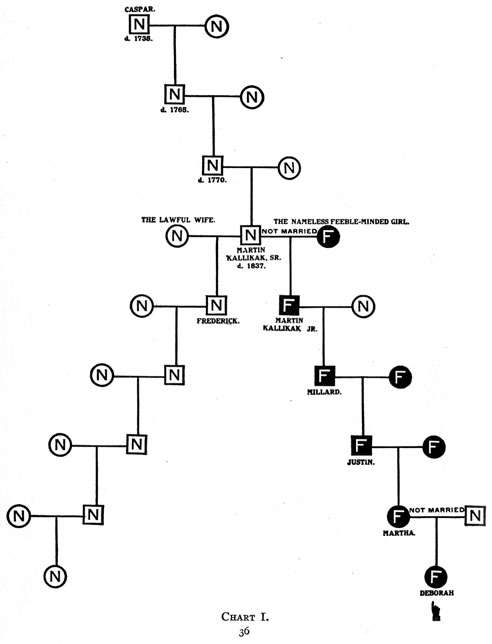
A pedigree chart from The Kallikak Family meant to show how one illicit tryst could lead to an entire generation of imbeciles.

The idea of "genius" and "talent" is also considered by William Graham Sumner, a founder of the American Sociological Society (now called the American Sociological Association). He maintained that if the government did not meddle with the social policy of laissez-faire, a class of genius would rise to the top of the system of social stratification, followed by a class of talent. Most of the rest of society would fit into the class of mediocrity. Those who were considered to be defective (mentally delayed, handicapped, etc.) had a negative effect on social progress by draining off necessary resources. They should be left on their own to sink or swim. But those in the class of delinquent (criminals, deviants, etc.) should be eliminated from society ("Folkways", 1907).

However, methods of eugenics were applied to reformulate more restrictive definitions of white racial purity in existing state laws banning interracial marriage: the so-called anti-miscegenation laws. The most famous example of the influence of eugenics and its emphasis on strict racial segregation on such "anti-miscegenation" legislation was Virginia's Racial Integrity Act of 1924. The U.S. Supreme Court overturned this law in 1967 in Loving v. Virginia, and declared anti-miscegenation laws unconstitutional.

With the passage of the Immigration Act of 1924, eugenicists for the first time played an important role in the Congressional debate as expert advisers on the threat of "inferior stock" from eastern and southern Europe. While eugenicists did support the act, they were also backed by many labor unions. The new act, inspired by the eugenic belief in the racial superiority of "old stock" white Americans as members of the "Nordic race" (a form of white supremacy), strengthened the position of existing laws prohibiting race-mixing. Eugenic considerations also lay behind the adoption of incest laws in much of the U.S. and were used to justify many anti-miscegenation laws.

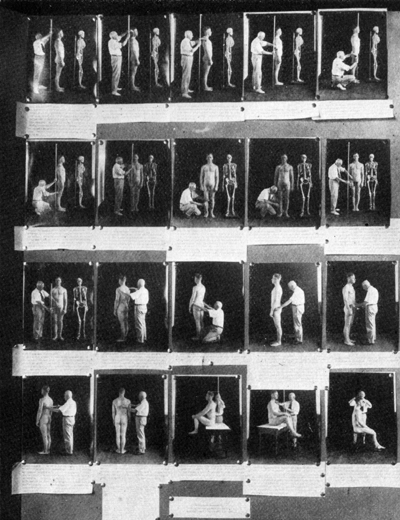
Anthropometry demonstrated in an exhibit from a 1921 eugenics conference.

Stephen Jay Gould asserted that restrictions on immigration passed in the United States during the 1920s (and overhauled in 1965 with the Immigration and Nationality Act) were motivated by the goals of eugenics. During the early 20th century, the United States and Canada began to receive far higher numbers of Southern and Eastern European immigrants. It has been argued that this stirred both Canada and the United States into passing laws creating a hierarchy of nationalities, rating them from the most desirable Anglo-Saxon and Nordic peoples to the Chinese and Japanese immigrants, who were almost completely banned from entering the country. Others, however, argued that Congress gave virtually no consideration to these factors, and claim the restrictions were motivated primarily by a desire to maintain the country's cultural integrity against the heavy influx of foreigners.

In the US, eugenics supporters included Theodore Roosevelt. Research was funded by distinguished philanthropies and carried out at prestigious universities. It was taught in college and high school classrooms. In its time eugenics was touted by some as scientific and progressive; the natural application of knowledge about breeding to the arena of human life. Before the realization of death camps in World War II, the idea that eugenics would lead to genocide was not taken seriously by the average American.

=== Australia ===
The policy of removing mixed-race Aboriginal children from their parents emerged from an opinion based on Eugenics theory in late 19th and early 20th century Australia that the 'full-blood' tribal Aboriginal would be unable to sustain itself, and was doomed to inevitable extinction, as at the time huge numbers of Aboriginals were in fact dying out, from diseases caught from European settlers. An ideology at the time held that mankind could be divided into a civilizational hierarchy. This notion supposed that Northern Europeans were superior in civilization and that Aboriginals were inferior. According to this view, the increasing numbers of mixed-descent children in Australia, labeled as "half-castes" (or alternatively "crossbreeds", "quadroons", and "octoroons") should develop within their respective communities, white or Aboriginal, according to their dominant parentage.

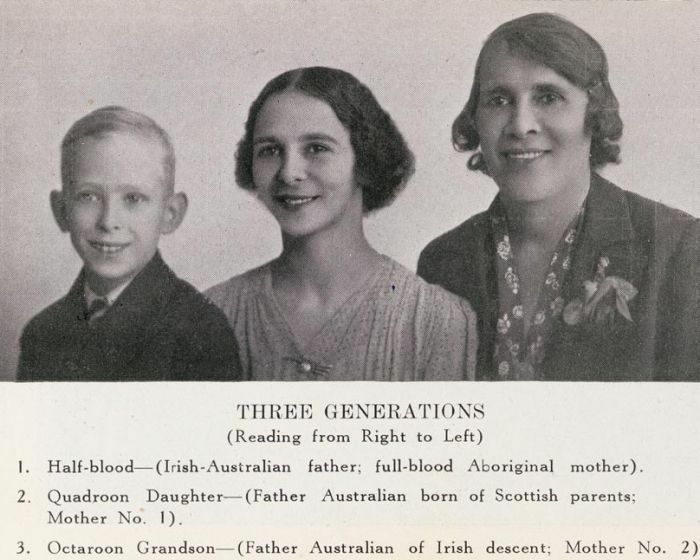
Three generations of racial whitening in a family of Australian Aboriginals. From right to left: a half-caste grandmother with her quadroon daughter and octoroon grandson. Image from a 1947 book by eugenicist A. O. Neville.

In the first half of the 20th century, this led to policies and legislation that resulted in the removal of children from their tribe. The stated aim was to culturally assimilate mixed-descent people into contemporary Australian society. In all states and territories legislation was passed in the early years of the 20th century which gave Aboriginal protectors guardianship rights over Aboriginal up to the age of sixteen or twenty-one. Policemen or other agents of the state (such as Aboriginal Protection Officers), were given the power to locate and transfer babies and children of mixed descent from their communities into institutions. In these Australian states and territories, half-caste institutions (both government or missionary) were established in the early decades of the 20th century for the reception of these separated children. The 2002 movie Rabbit-Proof Fence portrays a true story about this system and the harrowing consequences of attempting to overcome it.

In 1922, A.O. Neville was appointed the second Western Australia State Chief Protector of Aborigines. During the next quarter-century, he presided over the now notorious 'Assimilation' policy of removing mixed-race Aboriginal children from their parents.

Neville believed that biological absorption was the key to 'uplifting the Native race'. Speaking before the Moseley Royal Commission, which investigated the administration of Aboriginals in 1934, he defended the policies of forced settlement, removing children from parents, surveillance, discipline and punishment, arguing that "they have to be protected against themselves whether they like it or not. They cannot remain as they are. The sore spot requires the application of the surgeon's knife for the good of the patient, and probably against the patient's will". In his twilight years, Neville continued to actively promote his policy. Towards the end of his career, Neville published Australia's Coloured Minority, a text outlining his plan for the biological absorption of aboriginal people into white Australia.

=== Brazil ===
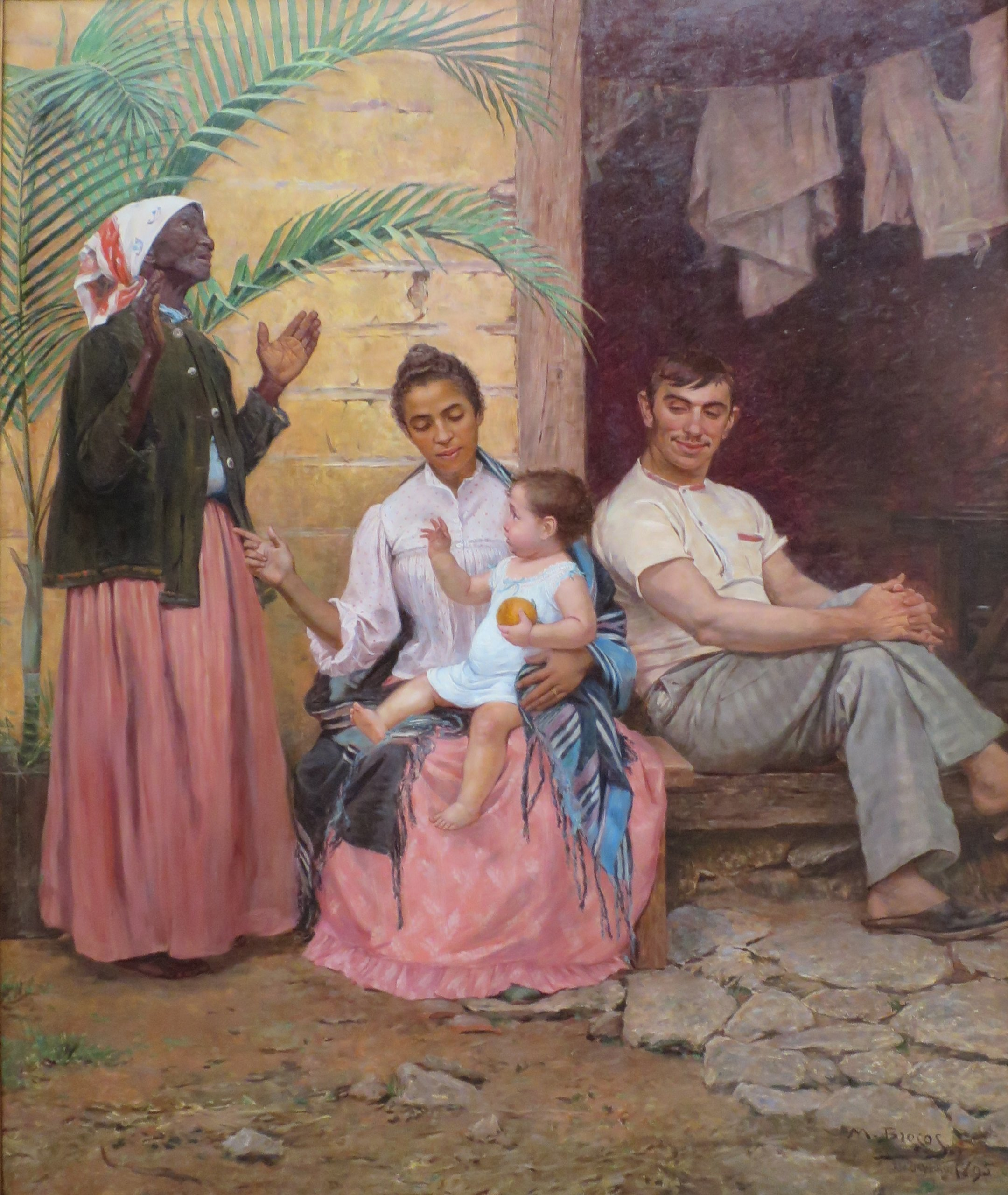
Portrait "Redenção de Can" (Ham's Redemption), (1895), by Galician painter Modesto Brocos, illustrating the process of racial whitening (branqueamento) through miscegenation in Brazil. The painting shows a Brazilian family: The grandmother is black, the mother is mulatto, the father is white, and the baby is white. Note the grandmother gesturing "thank god my grandson is white".

The idea of Social Darwinism was widespread among Brazil's leading scientists, educators, social thinkers, as well as many elected officials, in the late 1800s and early 1900s. This led to the "Politica de Branqueamento" (Whitening Policies) set in practice in Brazil in the early part of the 20th century. This series of laws intended to enlarge the numbers of the white race in Brazil through miscegenation with European immigrants.

The first official organized movement of eugenics in South America was a Eugenics Conference in April 1917, which was followed in January 1918 by the founding of the São Paulo Society of Eugenics. This society worked with health agencies and psychiatric offices to promote their ideas. The year 1931 saw the foundation of the "Comitê Central de Eugenismo" (Central Committee on Eugenics) presided by Renato Kehl. Among its suggestions were an end to the immigration of non-whites to Brazil, and the spread of policies against miscegenation.

The ideas of the Central Committee on Eugenics clashed with the Whitening Policies of the beginning of the 20th century. While the Whitening Policies advocated miscegenation in order to reduce the numbers of pure Africans in Brazil in favor of mulattos, who were expected to then produce white off-spring – a policy very similar to the "uplifting the Native race" in Australia – the Central Committee on Eugenics advocated no miscegenation at all and separation between the whites and non-whites in Brazil. When it became obvious that the future of Brazil was in industrialization (just as it was for other countries around the world), Brazil had to face whether they had a working force capable of being absorbed by an industrial society.

A new ideology was needed to counter such racialist claims. This ideology, known as Lusotropicalism, was associated with Gilberto Freyre, and became popular throughout the Portuguese Empire: specifically, Brazil and Angola. Lusotropicalism claimed that its large population of mixed-race people made Brazil the most capable country in tropical climates to carry out a program of industrialization. Its mixed-race population had the cultural and intellectual capabilities provided by the white race, which could not work in tropical climates, combined with the physical ability to work in tropical climates, provided by the African black race. This excluded the fact that white prisoners, working under penal servitude in Puerto Rico, seemed quite capable of working in a tropical environment.

==== Rockefeller Foundation in Brazil ====
In the first decades of the twentieth century, the work of the Rockefeller Foundation was decisive for the implementation of public health initiatives in Brazil, especially in the so-called public health movement. At that time, Brazilian eugenics was the same as public health, as expressed in the maxim "to sanitize is to eugenize".

=== Canada ===
In Canada, the eugenics movement gained support early in the 20th century as prominent physicians drew a direct link between heredity and public health. Eugenics was enforced by law in two Canadian provinces. In Alberta, the Sexual Sterilization Act was enacted in 1928, focusing the movement on the sterilization of mentally deficient individuals, as determined by the Alberta Eugenics Board. The campaign to enforce this action was backed by groups such as the United Farm Women's Group, including key member Emily Murphy.

The implementation of Alberta's Sexual Sterilization Act involved a system of institutional assessments and decisions made by the Alberta Eugenics Board. The Board recommended 4,739 individuals for sterilization between 1929 and 1972, with 2,834 ultimately undergoing the procedure. This represented approximately 60% of those recommended for sterilization. The legislation required consent before sterilization could be performed initially, but this requirement was removed in 1937 for individuals that were classified as "mentally defective." These classifications determined which individuals could be sterilized without their consent.

The program didn't affect all segments of Alberta's population equally. Women, teenagers, young adults, and Indigenous people were targeted by the Eugenics Board disproportionetly. Analysis of historical records concluded that sterilization decisions were influenced by more than just the intellectual ability of the individual. The program operated within a broader social environment, where ideas about disability, heredity, and what was deemed as "acceptable social behaviour" influenced how individuals were evaluated.

As in many other former British Empire colonies, eugenic policies were linked to racist (and racialist) agendas pursued by various levels of government, such as the forced sterilization of Canada's indigenous peoples and specific provincial government initiatives, such as Alberta's eugenics program. As a brief illustration, in 1928 the province of Alberta started an initiative, "…allowing any inmate of a native residential school to be sterilized upon the approval of the school Principal. At least 3,500 Indian women are sterilized under this law." As of 2011, research into extant archival records of sterilization and direct killing of First Nations youth (through intentional transmission of disease and other means) under the residential school program is ongoing.

Individuals were assessed using IQ tests like the Stanford-Binet. This posed a problem to new immigrants arriving in Canada, as many had not mastered the English language, and often their scores denoted them as having impaired intellectual functioning. As a result, many of those sterilized under the Sexual Sterilization Act were immigrants who were unfairly categorized. The province of British Columbia enacted its own Sexual Sterilization Act in 1933. As in Alberta, the British Columbia Eugenics Board could recommend the sterilization of those it considered to be suffering from "mental disease or mental deficiency".

Gender was another important factor in the implementation of Alberta's eugenics legislation. A 2008 study examined how the application of the Sexual Sterilization Act changed over time and how these changes affected men and women differently. Women were disproportionately represented among individuals presented to the Alberta Eugenics Board and those who underwent sterilization. Between 1929 and 1972, women accounted for approximately 54% of individuals presented to the Board and 58% of the 2,834 individuals who were sterilized. Women living in mental health institutions were also twice as likely as men to be presented to the Eugenics Board for sterilization, with probabilities of 0.048 and 0.024 respectively.

The likelihood of undergoing sterilization also differed between men and women. Of all women presented to the Eugenics Board, 64% were sterilized, compared to just 54% of men. Following the 1937 amendment to the Sexual Sterilization Act, men and women were targeted for sterilization for differing reasons, where men were more commonly subjected to involuntary sterilization, and women who were not classified as intellectually disabled but whose procedures required consent. However, the precense of a consent requirement did not mean that consent was freely given, thus both men and women were subject to involuntary sterilization.

The implementation of Alberta's Eugenics program also extended beyond mental health institutions through the involvement of teachers, public health nurses, and social workers. These professions played an important role in identifying individuals considered to have intellectual disabilities, collecting personal information and referring cases to provincial authorities. Their involvement allowed the provincial government to extend its eugenics policies into schools, homes and local communities.

Teachers were involved in identifying students who were believed to have intellectual disabilities, often through classroom observations and intelligence testing. Public health nurses also identified children during school examinations and child welfare clinics. Between 1922 and 1945, public health nurses recorded 315 children as having what was then classified as a mental deficiency, with 215 being identified through school examinations and 100 through child welfare clinics. Schools also contributed to the referral process, sending 5,926 new cases to provincial guidance clinics between 1931 and 1960. These clinics provided assessments and could recommend further supervision, institutionalization, or sterilization. Following the 1937 amendment, guidance clinics were allowed to present individuals directly to the Eugenics Board of Alberta, and approximately 32% of the Board's cases resulted from contact made with these clinics.

Ontario also experienced political support for eugenic policies during the 1920s and 1930s, although proposed legislations in line with the Sexual Sterilization Act were never passed.

In 1913, the Ontario Royal Commission on the Care and Control of the Mentally Defective and Feeble-Minded (a.k.a. Hodgins Commission) was appointed in response to concerns regarding the apparent connection between the increasing rate of venereal diseases in Ontario post World War I and the rise in number of feeble-minded individuals. It sought to determine the connection between venereal diseases, prostitution, and feeble-minded children by examining the number of feeble-minded individuals in Canadian and immigrant populations, reporting on recommendations regarding existing and potential new measures to manage these individuals.

The First Interim Report initially focused on the control of venereal diseases through marriage restrictions, raising concerns about the hereditary effects of such a disease. Eugenic ideals started appearing in the Second Report which recommended medical examinations before marriage was permitted and more strict medical examinations of immigrants. The final 1919 report recommended creating a provincial registry of individuals classified as feeble-minded, segregating them in institutions, and implementing marriage restrictions with criminal penalties for men who intentionally married women classified as mentally defective, but did not explicitly advocate for compulsory sterilization.

Approaching the appointment of the Royal Commission of Public Welfare (a.k.a. Ross Commission) in 1929, eugenic ideas continued to gain support, primarily by medical professionals promoting eugenics as a way to improve public health. The commission investigated the management of public institutions such as hospitals, psychiatric institutions and prisons, and recommended sterilization for “immoral” individuals, despite it not being part of the original mandate. This recommendation was inspired by the existing sterilization laws in Alberta and California at the time, and made on the belief that criminality, immorality, and mental deficiencies were hereditary.

The report was published in 1930, but legislation was ultimately rejected due to opposition form The Roman Catholic Church and concerns about political implecations discouraging government officials from engaging in the topic publicly.

The popularity of the eugenics movement peaked during the Depression where politicians and social reformers advocated for sterilization to prevent mentally or socially “unfit” individuals contributing to the existing burdon of unemployment and poverty.

The Eugenics Society of Canada was established in Ontario at this time by Dr. William Hutton. While the organization was not able to persuade the Ontario government to implement sterilization laws, the Ontario Medical Association did appeal for voluntary sterilization for men receiving government relief. In 1935, legal opinion decided that consensual sterilization for medical purposes was legal, but forced sterilization for eugenic or population control purposes was illegal.

Dorothea Palmer, a nurse working for the Parents Information Bureau – a privately funded birth control organization based out of Kitchener, Ontario – was arrested in the predominantly Catholic community of Eastview, Ontario in 1936. She was accused of illegally providing birth control materials and knowledge to her clients, primarily poor women. The defense at her trial was mounted by an industrialist and influential eugenicist from Kitchener, A.R. Kaufman. Palmer was acquitted in early 1937. The trial lasted less than a year, and later became known as The Eastview Birth Control Trial.

The Magone Commission was created in 1938 in response to allegations of mistreatement and wrongful incarceration of individuals in mental institutuions, however the report ultimately supported the Eugenics Society of Canada’s proposal to amend the Ontario Medical Act to protect medical professionals in cases where strilization of an individual was carried out with their consent, or a guardian in the case of mental disability.

Although the eugenics excesses of Nazi Germany diminished the popularity of the eugenics movement, the Sexual Sterilization Acts of Alberta and British Columbia were not repealed until 1972.

=== Germany ===
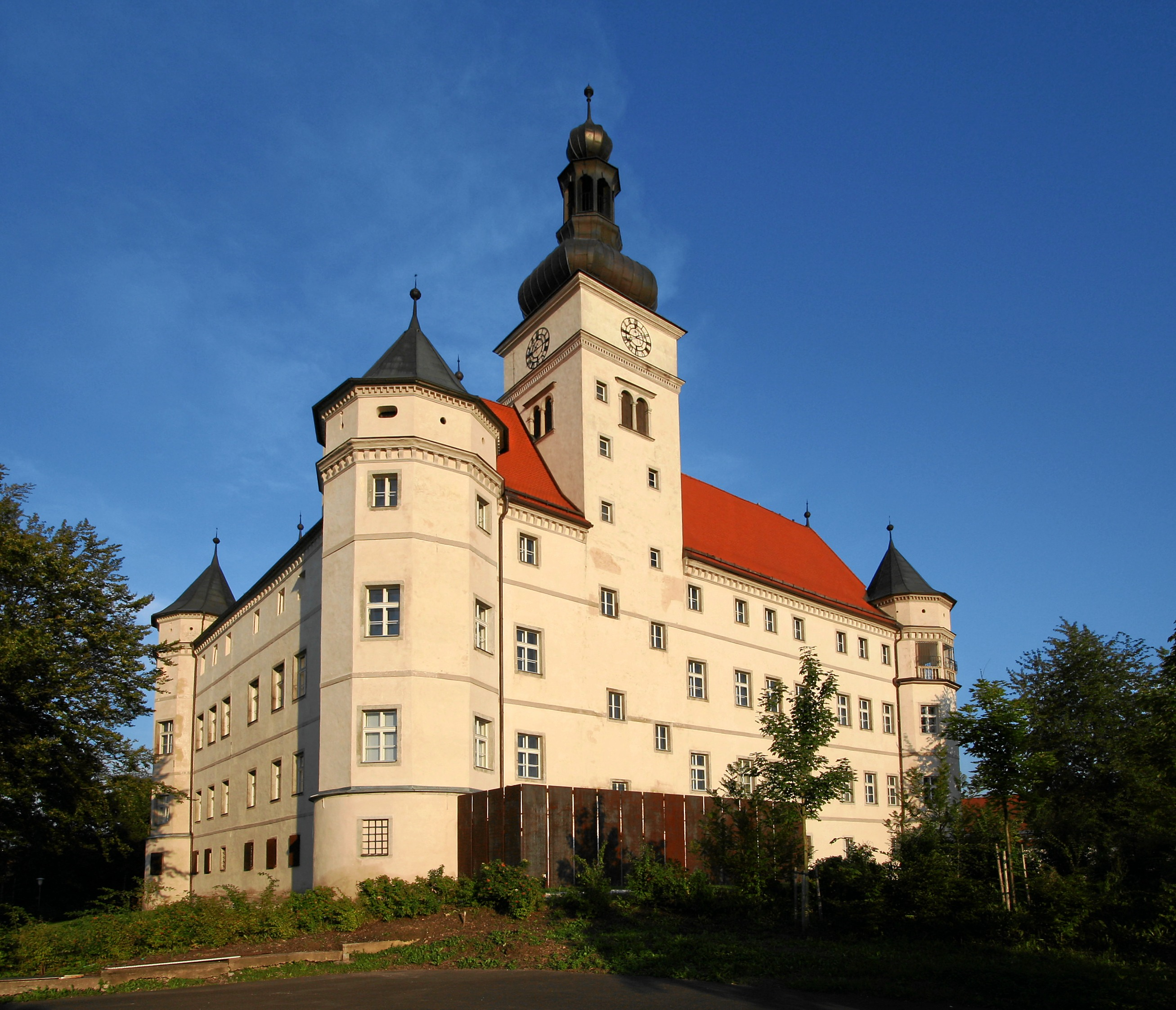
Hartheim Euthanasia Centre in 2005

Nazi Germany under Adolf Hitler was well known for eugenics programs which attempted to maintain a "pure" Aryan race through a series of programs that ran under the banner of racial hygiene. Among other activities, the Nazis performed extensive experimentation on live human beings to test their genetic theories, ranging from simple measurement of physical characteristics to the research for Otmar von Verschuer carried out by Karin Magnussen using "human material" gathered by Josef Mengele on twins and others at Auschwitz death camp. During the 1930s and 1940s, the Nazi regime used forced sterilization on hundreds of thousands of people whom they viewed as mentally ill, an estimated 400,000 between 1934 and 1937. The scale of the Nazi program prompted one American eugenics advocate to seek an expansion of their program, with one complaining that "the Germans are beating us at our own game."

The Nazis went further, however, murdering tens of thousands of the institutionalized disabled through compulsory "euthanasia" programs such as Aktion T4. They used gas chambers and lethal injections to murder their victims.

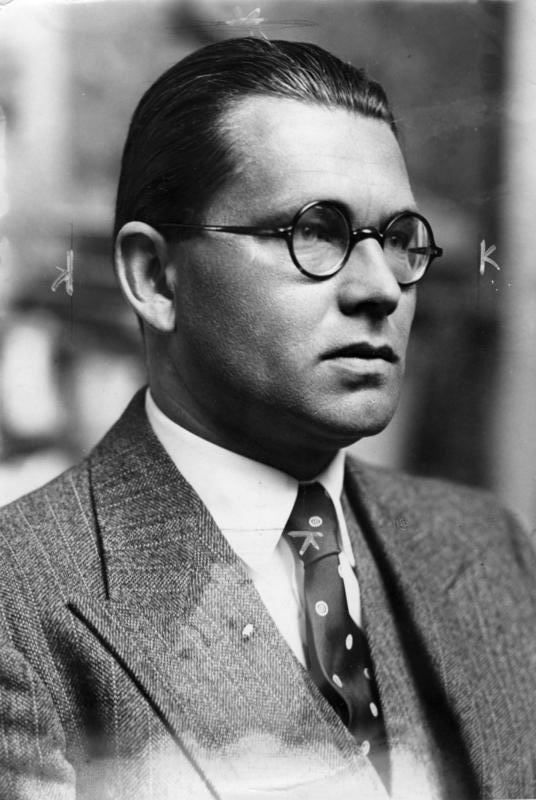
Philipp Bouhler, Head of the Aktion T4 programme

They also implemented a number of "positive" eugenics policies, giving awards to Aryan women who had large numbers of children and encouraged a service in which "racially pure" single women could deliver illegitimate children. Allegations that such women were also impregnated by SS officers in the Lebensborn were not proven at the Nuremberg trials, but new evidence (and the testimony of Lebensborn children) has established more details about Lebensborn practices. Also, "racially valuable" children from occupied countries were forcibly removed from their parents and adopted by German people. Many of their concerns for eugenics and racial hygiene were also explicitly present in their systematic murder of millions of "undesirable" people, especially Jews who were singled out for the Final Solution, this policy led to the horrors seen in the Holocaust.

The scope and coercion involved in the German eugenics programs along with a strong use of the rhetoric of eugenics and so-called "racial science" throughout the regime created an indelible cultural association between eugenics and the Third Reich in the post-war years.

The ideas of eugenics and race were used, in part, as justification for German colonial expansion throughout the world. Germany, as well as Great Britain, sought to seize the colonial territories of other 'dying' empires which could no longer protect their possessions. Examples included China, the Portuguese Empire, the Spanish Empire, the Dutch Empire and the Danish Empire.

Thus the colonies Germany required for her bursting population, as markets for her overproductive industries and sources of vital raw materials, and as symbols of her world power would simply have to be taken from weaker nations, so the pan-Germans asserted publicly and the German government believed secretly.

==== German colonies in Africa ====
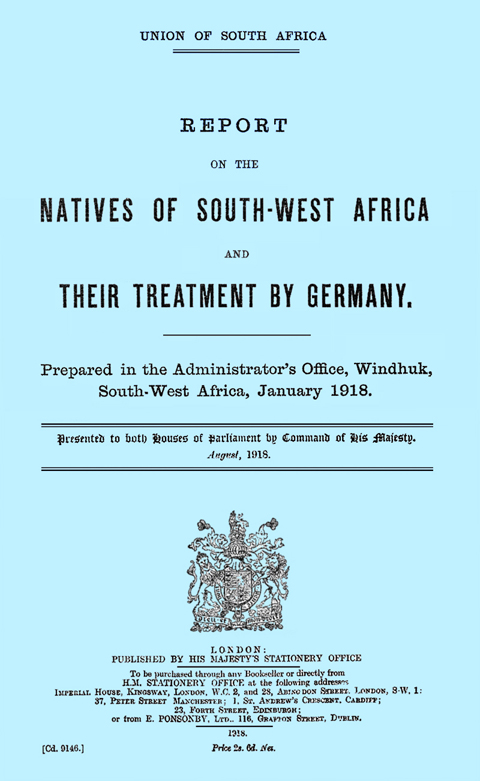
Cover of the 1918 British Bluebook, originally available "At any bookstore or through H. M. Stationery Office [His Majesty's Stationery Office]", until 1926, when it was removed from the public and destroyed.

German colonies in Africa from 1885 to 1918 included German South-West Africa (present-day Namibia), Kamerun (present-day Cameroon), Togoland (present-day Togo) and German East Africa (present-day Tanzania. Rwanda and Burundi). Genocide was carried out there, against the Herero people of present-day Namibia and later a programme of research in physical anthropology was conducted using their skulls.

The rulers of German South West Africa carried out a programme of genocide against the aboriginal Herero people. One of the officials enacting this program was General Adrian Dietrich Lothar von Trotha.

The 1918 British "Bluebook" documented the genocide that took place at Shark Island and Windhoek Concentration Camps, including photographs. The Bluebook was used as a negotiating tool by the British at the end of World War I to gain control of what had been German Southwest Africa, after Germany was defeated.

Skulls of the Herero were collected from Rehoboth, Namibia in about 1904, for the purpose of demonstrating the supposed physical inferiority of these people. The Kaiser Wilhelm Institute used the Herero skulls by 1928.

The physical anthropologists used measurements of skull capacity, etc., in an attempt to prove that Jews, Blacks and Italians were inherently "inferior" to Whites. Examples of such activity were found from about 1928 at the Kaiser Wilhelm Institute of Anthropology, Human Heredity, and Eugenics. This contrasted with a lot of 19th-century German anthropology which was generally more cosmopolitan.

==== German colonies in the Pacific ====
Eugen Fischer of the Kaiser Wilhelm Institute of Anthropology, Human Heredity, and Eugenics and his students carried out "Bastard studies" anthropological studies of mixed race people throughout the German colonial empire, including the colonies in Africa and the Pacific. Fischer also worked with the United States eugenicist Charles Davenport.

==== Caribbean and South America ====
Rita Hauschild, a doctoral student and then staff member of the Kaiser Wilhelm Institute for Human Heredity, Anthropology, and Eugenics, carried out "bastard studies", anthropometric studies of mixed-heritage populations in Trinidad and Venezuela, in pursuit of the Nazi doctrine of "racial hygiene". Her research was at first confined to Tovar, Venezuela, a former German colony, and was extended to Trinidad with support from the UK Foreign Office. The populations studied, in 1935 to 1937, were "Chinese-Negro hybrids" in Trinidad, "Chinese-Indian" and "Chinese-Negro" "hybrids" in Venezuela. In addition, Johannes Schaeuble engaged in "bastard studies" in Chile.

=== Japan ===
In the early part of the Shōwa era, Japanese governments executed a eugenics policy to limit the birth of children with "inferior" traits, as well as aiming to protect the life and health of mothers. The Race Eugenic Protection Law was submitted from 1934 to 1938 to the Imperial Diet. After four amendments, this draft was promulgated as the National Eugenic Law in 1940 by the Konoe government. According to the Eugenic Protection Law (1948), sterilization could be enforced on criminals "with genetic predisposition to commit crime", patients with genetic diseases such as total color-blindness, hemophilia, albinism and ichthyosis, and mental affections such as schizophrenia, and manic-depressiveness, and those with epilepsy. Mental illnesses were added in 1952.

The Leprosy Prevention laws of 1907, 1931 and 1953, the last one only repealed in 1996, permitted the segregation of patients in sanitariums where forced abortions and sterilization were common, even if the laws did not refer to it, and authorized punishment of patients "disturbing peace", as most Japanese leprologists believed that vulnerability to the disease was inheritable. There were a few Japanese leprologists such as Noburo Ogasawara who argued against the "isolation-sterilization policy" but he was denounced as a traitor to the nation at the 15th conference of the Japanese Association of Leprology in 1941.

One of the last eugenic measures of the Shōwa regime was taken by the Higashikuni government. On 19 August 1945, the Home Ministry ordered local government offices to establish a prostitution service for Allied occupation soldiers to preserve the "purity" of the "Japanese race". The official declaration stated: "Through the sacrifice of thousands of "Okichis" of the Shōwa era, we shall construct a dike to hold back the mad frenzy of the occupation troops and cultivate and preserve the purity of our race long into the future..."

=== Korea ===
Early in the Japanese administration of Korea, staff at the Japanese Association of Leprology attempted to discourage marriage between Japanese women and Korean men who had been recruited from the peninsula as laborers following its annexation by Japan in 1910. In 1942, a survey report argued that "the Korean laborers brought to Japan... are of the lower classes and therefore of inferior constitution...By fathering children with Japanese women, these men could lower the caliber of the Yamato minzoku". However, eugenics pioneer Unno Kōtoku of Ryukyu University influentially argued based on heterosis in plants that exclusive Japanese endogamy might cause "degeneration" of the Japanese race. Since he regarded intermarriage with white or black people as "disastrous", he advocated intermarriage with Koreans, whose "inferior" physical characteristics would be subsumed by the "superior" Japanese, according to his thinking. Japanese-Korean intermarriage was promoted by the government in Korea using serological studies that claimed to prove that Japanese and Koreans had the same pure ancestral origin.

In the 20th century, the idea of eugenics was imported to South Korea from Nazi Germany and Imperial Japan. During the 1970s and 80s, the military dictatorships of the Fourth and Fifth Republics of South Korea established various internment and concentration camps, most famously the so-called Brothers Home, which forcibly detained people from the lower classes (often falsely accused of being homeless). Additionally, from the mid-1970s to the mid-1990s, these dictatorships, as well as the currently ruling Sixth Republic which succeeded them, sterilized mentally ill and intellectually disabled individuals; the exact number of individuals sterilized is not known. A law imposed by Park Chung-Hee permitting the involuntary sterilization of mentally ill or intellectually disabled South Koreans was repealed only in 1997.

=== China ===
Eugenics was one of many ideas and programs debated in the 1920s and 1930s in Republican China, as a means of improving society and raising China's stature in the world. The principal Chinese proponent of eugenics was the prominent sociologist Pan Guangdan, and a significant number of intellectuals entered into the debate, including Gao Xisheng, biologist Zhou Jianren, sociologist Chen Da, and Chen Jianshan, and many others. Chen Da is notable for the link he provides to the family planning policy and One Child Policy enacted in China after the establishment of the People's Republic of China.

=== Singapore ===
Lee Kuan Yew, the founding father of Singapore, actively promoted eugenics as late as 1983. In 1984, Singapore began providing financial incentives to highly educated women to encourage them to have more children. For this purpose was introduced the "Graduate Mother Scheme" that incentivised graduate women to get married as much as the rest of their populace. The incentives were extremely unpopular and regarded as eugenic, and were seen as discriminatory towards Singapore's non-Chinese ethnic population. In 1985, the incentives were partly abandoned as ineffective, while the government matchmaking agency, the Social Development Network, remained active until 2023.

=== Other countries ===
Other countries that adopted some form of eugenics program at one time include Sweden, Denmark, Estonia, Finland, France, Iceland, Norway, and Switzerland with programs to sterilize people the government declared to be mentally deficient.

In Denmark, the first eugenics proposal was in 1926, under the Social Democrats. In 1929, Denmark was the first in Europe to pass a nation-wide law on sterilization. (With the U.S. being the first internationally, and Switzerland being the first in Europe regarding regional laws.) More legislation was passed in 1932. Though the sterilization was initially voluntary (at least theoretically), the law passed in 1932 allowed for involuntary sterilization of some groups.

In Norway, a law was passed that allowed forced sterilization in 1934, under the Liberals.

=== Marginalization after World War II and crypto-eugenics ===
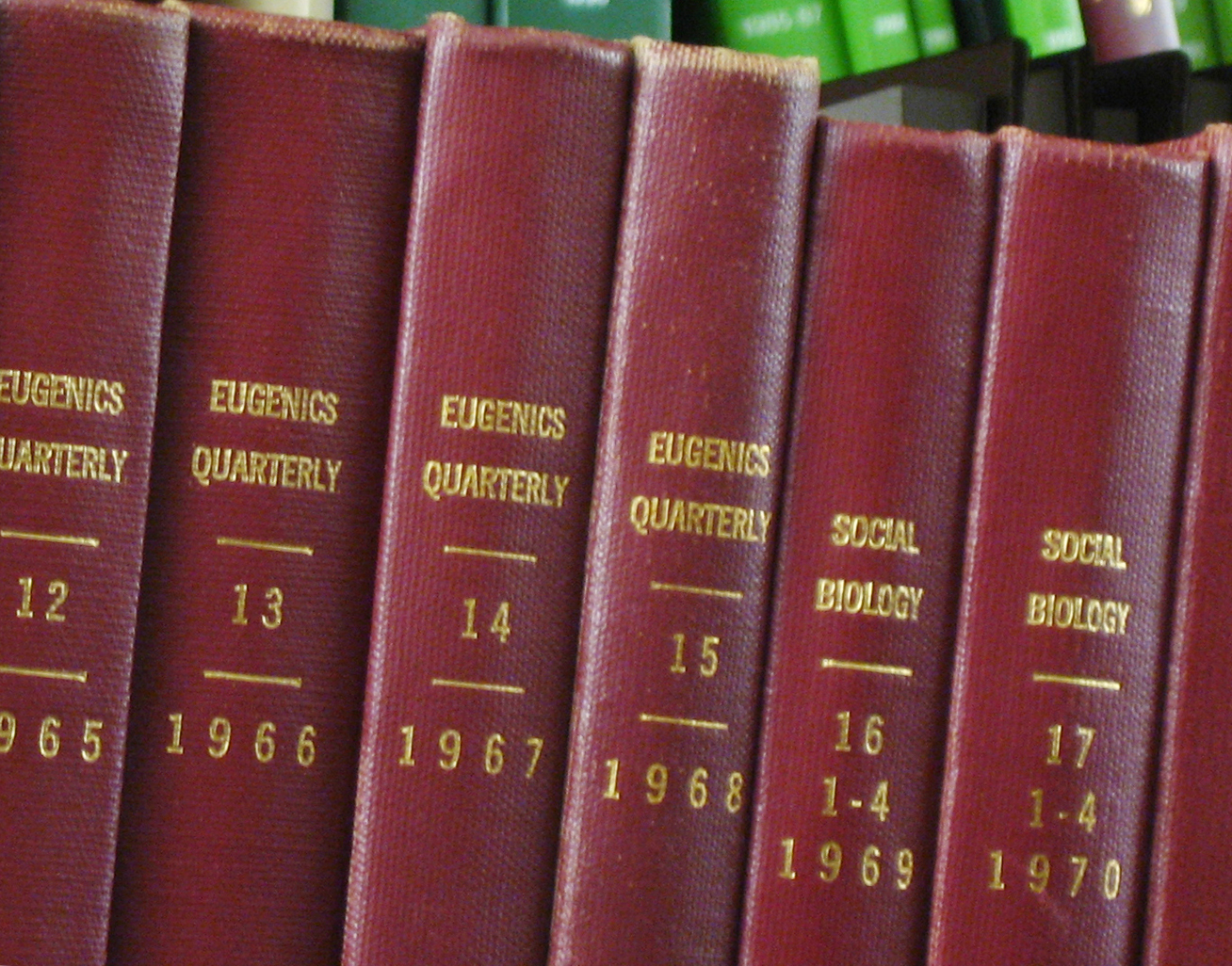
In the decades after World War II, eugenics became increasingly unpopular within academic science. Many organizations and journals that had their origins in the eugenics movement began to distance themselves from the philosophy, as when Eugenics Quarterly became Social Biology in 1969.

Beginning in the late 1920s, greater appreciation of the difficulty of predicting characteristics of offspring from their heredity, and scientists' recognition of the inadequacy of simplistic theories of eugenics, undermined whatever scientific basis had been ascribed to the social movement. As the Great Depression took hold, criticism of economic value as a proxy for human worth became increasingly compelling. After the experience of Nazi Germany, many ideas about "racial hygiene" and "unfit" members of society were discredited. The Nuremberg Trials against former Nazi leaders revealed to the world many of the regime's genocidal practices and resulted in formalized policies of medical ethics and the 1950 UNESCO statement on race. Many scientific societies released their own similar "race statements" over the years, and the Universal Declaration of Human Rights, developed in response to abuses during the Second World War, was adopted by the United Nations in 1948 and affirmed, "Men and women of full age, without any limitation due to race, nationality or religion, have the right to marry and to found a family." In continuation, the 1978 UNESCO declaration on race and racial prejudice states that the fundamental equality of all human beings is the ideal toward which ethics and science should converge.

In reaction to Nazi abuses, eugenics became almost universally reviled in many of the nations where it had once been popular (however, some eugenics programs, including sterilization, continued quietly for decades). Many pre-war eugenicists engaged in what they later labeled "crypto-eugenics", purposefully taking their eugenic beliefs "underground" and becoming respected anthropologists, biologists and geneticists in the postwar world (including Robert Yerkes in the U.S. and Otmar von Verschuer in Germany). Californian eugenicist Paul Popenoe founded marriage counseling during the 1950s, a career change which grew from his eugenic interests in promoting "healthy marriages" between "fit" couples.

In 1957, a special meeting of Britain's Eugenics Society discussed ways to stem losses in membership, including the suggestion "that the Society should pursue eugenic ends by less obvious means, that is by a policy of crypto-eugenics, which was apparently proving successful with the US Eugenics Society". In February 1960 the Council resolved to pursue "activities in crypto-eugenics...vigorously" and "specifically" to increase payments to the Family Planning Association and the International Planned Parenthood Federation. The subsequent sale of a birth-control clinic (the bequest of Dr Marie Stopes) to Dr Tim Black and the change of Society's name to Galton Institute (on the grounds that it was "less evocative") align with the Society's crypto-eugenic policy.

The American Life League, an opponent of abortion, charges that eugenics was merely "re-packaged" after the war, and promoted anew in the guise of the population-control and environmentalism movements. They claim, for example, that Planned Parenthood was funded and cultivated by the Eugenics Society for these reasons. Julian Huxley, the first Director-General of UNESCO and a founder of the World Wildlife Fund, was also a Eugenics Society president and a strong supporter of eugenics.

[E]ven though it is quite true that any radical eugenic policy will be for many years politically and psychologically impossible, it will be important for UNESCO to see that the eugenic problem is examined with the greatest care, and that the public mind is informed of the issues at stake so that much that now is unthinkable may at least become thinkable. --Julian Huxley

High school and college textbooks from the 1920s through the 1940s often had chapters touting the scientific progress to be had from applying eugenic principles to the population. Many early scientific journals devoted to heredity in general were run by eugenicists and featured eugenics articles alongside studies of heredity in nonhuman organisms. Even the names of some journals changed to reflect new attitudes. For example, Eugenics Quarterly became Social Biology in 1969 (the journal still exists today, though it looks little like its predecessor). Notable members of the American Eugenics Society (1922–94) during the second half of the 20th century included Joseph Fletcher, originator of Situational ethics; Clarence Gamble of the Procter & Gamble fortune; and Garrett Hardin, a population control advocate and author of the essay The Tragedy of the Commons.

In the United States, the eugenics movement had largely lost most popular and political support by the end of the 1930s, while forced sterilizations mostly ended in the 1960s with the last performed in 1981. Many US states continued to prohibit biracial marriages with "anti-miscegenation laws" such as Virginia's Racial Integrity Act of 1924, until they were overruled by the Supreme Court in 1967 in Loving v. Virginia. The Immigration Restriction Act of 1924, which was designed to limit the immigration of "dysgenic" Italians, and eastern European Jews, was repealed and replaced by the Immigration and Nationality Act in 1965.

However, some prominent academics continued to support eugenics after the war. In 1963 the Ciba Foundation convened a conference in London under the title "Man and His Future", at which three distinguished biologists and Nobel laureates (Hermann Muller, Joshua Lederberg, and Francis Crick) all spoke strongly in favor of eugenics. A few nations, notably the Canadian province of Alberta, maintained large-scale eugenics programs, including forced sterilization of mentally handicapped individuals, as well as other practices, until the 1970s.

== Modern eugenics, genetic engineering, and ethical re-evaluation ==
Beginning in the 1980s, the history and concept of eugenics were widely discussed as knowledge about genetics advanced significantly, making practical genetic engineering, which has been widely used to produce genetically modified organisms, with genetically modified foods being most visible to the general public. Endeavors such as the Human Genome Project made the effective modification of the human species seem possible again (as did Darwin's initial theory of evolution in the 1860s, along with the rediscovery of Mendel's laws in the early 20th century). Article 23 of the Convention on the Rights of Persons with Disabilities prohibits compulsory sterilization of disabled individuals and guarantees their right to adopt children.

A few scientific researchers such as psychologist Richard Lynn, psychologist Raymond Cattell, and scientist Gregory Stock have openly called for eugenic policies using modern technology, but they represent a minority opinion in current scientific and cultural circles. One attempted implementation of a form of eugenics was a "genius sperm bank" (1980–99) created by Robert Klark Graham, from which nearly 230 children were conceived (the best-known donors were Nobel Prize winners William Shockley and J. D. Watson). After Graham died in 1997 funding ran out, and within two years his sperm bank had closed.

Richard J. Herrnstein and Charles Murray's book The Bell Curve argued that immigration from countries with low national IQ is undesirable. According to Raymond Cattell, "when a country is opening its doors to immigration from diverse countries, it is like a farmer who buys his seeds from different sources by the sack, with sacks of different average quality of contents".

=== Modern China ===
With the People's Republic of China's 1950 Marriage Law stating that "impotence, venereal disease, mental disorder and leprosy", as well as any other diseases seen by medical science as making a person unfit to marry, were grounds for prohibition from marriage. The 1980 law dropped all specific conditions bar leprosy, and the 2001 law now specifies no conditions, simply approval by a medical doctor.

Various provinces began to pass laws barring certain classes of people, such as the mentally delayed, from reproducing in the late 1980s. The Chinese Maternal and Infant Health Care Law (1994), which has been referred to as the "Eugenic Law" in the West, required a health check prior to marriage. Carriers of certain genetic diseases were allowed to marry only if they are sterilized, or agree to use some other form of long-term contraception. Though the requirement for the health check has been dropped at the national level, it continues to be required by some provinces. Local medical doctors make the decision on who is "unfit" to marry. Much Western comment on the law has been critical, but many Chinese geneticists are supportive of the policy.

In the Chinese province of Sichuan in 1999, a sperm bank called Notables' Sperm Bank opened, with professors as the only permitted donors. The semen bank was approved by the authority for family planning in the provincial capital Chengdu.

=== Modern Japan ===
In postwar Japan, the Eugenic Protection Law (ja:優生保護法, Yusei Hogo Hō) was enacted in 1948 to replace the National Eugenic Law of 1940. The main provisions allowed for the surgical sterilization of women, when the woman, her spouse, or family member within the 4th degree of kinship had a serious genetic disorder, and where pregnancy would endanger the life of the woman. The operation required consent of the woman, her spouse and the approval of the Prefectural Eugenic Protection Council.

The law also allowed for abortion for pregnancies in the cases of rape, leprosy, hereditary-transmitted disease, or if the physician determined that the fetus would not be viable outside of the womb. Again, the consent of the woman and her spouse were necessary. Birth control guidance and implementation was restricted to doctors, nurses and professional midwives accredited by the Prefectural government. The law was also amended in May 1949 to allow abortions for economic reasons at the sole discretion of the doctor, which in effect fully legalized abortion in Japan.

Although the law's wording is unambiguous, it was used by local authorities as justification for measures enforcing forced sterilization and abortions upon people with certain genetic disorders, as well as leprosy, as well as an excuse for legalized discrimination against people with physical and mental handicaps.

=== Modern Russia ===
In Russia, one supporter of preventive eugenics is the president of the Independent Psychiatric Association of Russia Yuri Savenko, who justifies forced sterilization of women, which is practiced in Moscow psychoneurological nursing homes. He states that “one needs a more strictly adjusted and open control for the practice of preventive eugenics, which, in itself, is, in its turn, justifiable.” In 1993, the health minister of the Russian Federation issued the order that determined the procedure of forced abortion and sterilization of disabled women and the need for court decision to perform them. The order was repealed by the head of Ministry of Health and Social Development of the Russian Federation Tatyana Golikova in 2009. Therefore, now women can be subjected to compulsory sterilization without court decision, according to the Perm Krai ombudswoman Tatyana Margolina. In 2008, Tatyana Margolina reported that 14 women with disabilities were subjected to compulsory medical sterilization in Ozyorskiy psychoneurological nursing home whose director was Grigori Bannikov. The sterilizations were performed not on the basis mandatory court decision appropriate for them, but only on the basis of the application by the guardian Bannikov. On 2 December 2010, the court has not found corpus delicti in the compulsory medical sterilizations performed by his consent.

=== Israel ===
Dor Yeshorim, a program which seeks to reduce the incidence of Tay–Sachs disease, cystic fibrosis, Canavan disease, Fanconi anemia, familial dysautonomia, glycogen storage disease, Bloom Syndrome, Gaucher disease, Niemann-Pick disease, and mucolipidosis IV among certain Jewish communities, is another screening program which has drawn comparisons with liberal eugenics. In Israel, at the expense of the state, the general public is advised to carry out genetic tests to diagnose these diseases early in the pregnancy. If a fetus is diagnosed with one of these diseases, among which Tay–Sachs is the most commonly known, the pregnancy may be terminated, subject to consent.

Most other Ashkenazi Jewish communities also run screening programs because of the higher incidence of genetic diseases. In some Jewish communities, the ancient custom of matchmaking (shidduch) is still practiced, and some matchmakers require blood tests so that they can avoid making matches between individuals who share the same recessive disease traits. In order to attempt to prevent the tragedy of infant death which always results from being homozygous for Tay–Sachs, associations such as the strongly observant Dor Yeshorim (which was founded by Rabbi Joseph Ekstein, who lost four children to the disease) with the purpose of preventing others from suffering the same tragedy test young couples to check whether they carry a risk of passing on fatal conditions.

If both the young man and woman are Tay–Sachs carriers, it is common for the match to be broken off. Judaism, like numerous other religions, discourages abortion unless there is a risk to the woman, in which case her needs take precedence. The effort is not aimed at eradicating the hereditary traits, but rather at the occurrence of homozygosity. The actual impact of this program on allele frequencies is unknown, but little impact would be expected because the program does not impose genetic selection. Instead, it encourages disassortative mating.

=== Ethical re-assessment ===
Which ideas should be described as "eugenic" are still controversial. Bio-ethicists Stephen Wilkinson and Eve Garrard note that due to its history, "there's no overwhelming argument for completely abandoning the term 'eugenics', but concerns remain about ambiguity, confusion and manipulation, and the consequent failure to respect people's autonomy." The pair argue that anyone using the term "must at least be clear about what they mean by it and be prepared to offer a clear definition. Otherwise unnecessary confusion and disagreement may ensue."

Modern inquiries into the potential use of genetic engineering have led to an increased invocation of the history of eugenics in discussions of bioethics, most often as a cautionary tale. Some suggest that even non-coercive eugenics programs are inherently unethical.

James D. Watson, the first director of the Human Genome Project, initiated the Ethical, Legal and Social Implications Program (ELSI) which has funded a number of studies into the implications of human genetic engineering (along with a prominent website on the history of eugenics), because:

In putting ethics so soon into the genome agenda, I was responding to my own personal fear that all too soon critics of the Genome Project would point out that I was a representative of the Cold Spring Harbor Laboratory that once housed the controversial Eugenics Record Office. My not forming a genome ethics program quickly might be falsely used as evidence that I was a closet eugenicist, having as my real long-term purpose the unambiguous identification of genes that lead to social and occupational stratification as well as genes justifying racial discrimination.

Philosopher Philip Kitcher, writing in 1997, has described the use of genetic screening by parents as making possible a form of "voluntary" eugenics. In 2006, Richard Dawkins stated that breeding humans for traits is possible and society should not be afraid to debate the ethical differences between breeding a child for an ability versus forcing a child to gain an ability through training.

Historian Nathaniel C. Comfort wrote in 2012, "The eugenic impulse drives us to eliminate disease, live longer and healthier, with greater intelligence, and a better adjustment to the conditions of society." Comfort claims, "the health benefits, the intellectual thrill and the profits of genetic biomedicine are too great for us to do otherwise."

Bill McKibben suggests that emerging reprogenetic technologies would be disproportionately available to those with greater financial resources, thereby exacerbating the gap between rich and poor and creating a "genetic divide". Lee M. Silver, a biologist and science writer who coined the term "reprogenetics" and supports its applications, has expressed concern that these methods could create a two-tiered society of genetically engineered "haves" and "have nots" if social democratic reforms lag behind implementation of reprogenetic technologies.

== See also ==
- Outline of eugenics
