= Arthur Estabrook =

American researcher and eugenist (1885–1973)

Arthur Howard Estabrook
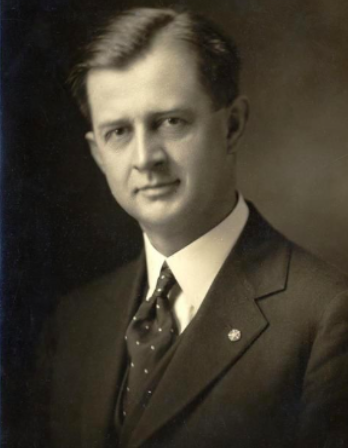
- Arthur H. Estabrook in 1921
- Born: May 9, 1885; Leicester, Massachusetts, U.S.
- Died: December 6, 1973 (aged 88); Chatham Center, New York, U.S.
- Burial place: Mount Hope Cemetery, Bangor, Maine, U.S.
- Citizenship: United States
- Education: Clark University; Johns Hopkins University
- Occupation: Researcher

Arthur Howard Estabrook (May 9, 1885 – December 6, 1973) was an American researcher and eugenist.

== Early life and education ==
Arthur Estabrook was born on May 9, 1885, in Leicester, Massachusetts. His parents were Susan Rebecca (Beck) and Arthur Francis Estabrook.

Estabrook earned his bachelor's and master's degrees at Clark University, the latter in 1906. He remained at Clark after graduating, serving as a fellow and assistant in the zoology department until 1907. In 1910, he completed his doctorate from Johns Hopkins University. He married Jessie McCubbin on October 25, 1911. He also studied at the School of Philanthropy at Columbia University in 1914.

== Career ==
After completing his doctorate in 1910, Estabrook joined the Carnegie Institution, working in the Eugenics Record Office at Cold Spring Harbor. During his work at Carnegie, he was a special investigator for the Indiana State Commission on Mental Defectives for two years, from 1916 until 1918. That year, he served in World War I in the United States Army as a Captain in the Sanitary Corps. His service ended in 1920.

In 1924, Estabrook traveled to Amherst County, Virginia, where he served as an expert witness during the first trial regarding the forced sterilization of Carrie E. Buck. He spoke in favor of the sterilization. Estabrook served as president of the Eugenics Research Association from 1925 until 1926. Estabrook returned to Virginia to represent the Eugenics Record Office during Buck v. Bell in 1927. He did research around the court case in Virginia, researching sterilization and its use in Virginia. Estabrook worked at Carnegie in the Eugenics Record Office until 1929, when he joined the American Society for the Control of Cancer. By 1931, his wife, Jessie McCubbin, had died. He married his second wife, Anne Ruth Medcalf, on July 8, 1931.

=== Research ===
Estabrook was a eugenist and studied dysgenics. In 1912, he and Charles Davenport studied the Nam family. The Nam family, the name which is a pseudonym, for a New York "degenerate family" with high rates of crime, disease and poverty in the family. He published a work about the family with Davenport, advocating eugenics. In 1915, Estabrook published a re-analysis of Richard Louis Dugdale's work about the Jukes family. While Dugdale's work supported improving the environment which led to the Jukes family having high rates of crime among family members, Estabrook took Dugdale's research and created a proposal for forced sterilization to be used to prevent Jukes family members from reproducing.

Estabrook's researched interracial relationships which included mixed race people, Europeans, Africans, and Native Americans in North Carolina. He also studied the proposed connections between race and intelligence. Estabrook studied the Lumbee in Pembroke, North Carolina. His researched resulted in the work Mongrel Virginians: The Win Tribe, published in 1926 and co-authored with Ivan E. McDougle.

Estabrook also researched eugenics and sterilization of children with disabilities in Erie County and Buffalo in New York. He also studied housing in Buffalo.

== Later life and death ==
Estabrook died in Chatham Center, New York, on December 6, 1973. He is buried in Mount Hope Cemetery in Bangor, Maine.

== Legacy ==
The papers of Estabrook are held in the collections of the Indiana State Library, the Carnegie Institution, the American Philosophical Society, and the University at Albany, SUNY.

== Works by Arthur Estabrook ==
- (1910). Effect of chemicals on growth in paramecium. Baltimore.
- with Davenport, C. Benedict. (1912). The Nam family: a study in cacogenics. Cold Spring Harbor, N.Y: The New Era Printing Company].
- (1916). The Jukes in 1915. Washington: The Carnegie Institution of Washington.
- with McDougle, I. E. (Ivan Eugene)., Carnegie Institution of Washington. Dept. of Genetics. (1926). Mongrel Virginians: the Win tribe. Baltimore: The Williams & Wilkins Company.
