= Piney (Pine Barrens resident) =

Residents of the New Jersey Pine Barrens, US

Piney is a historically derogatory exonym for the inhabitants of the New Jersey Pine Barrens, but it is now also sometimes used as an endonym by them, humorously or otherwise. The Pine Barrens have sandy, acidic soil considered unsuitable for traditional farming by early settlers, who called the land "barren". The area is forested mainly with pitch pine and scrub oak. Many areas are swampy with cedar forests that grow along brownish-red, fresh water called "cedar water." The red color is actually created by the high level of iron in the water.

Living conditions in the "Barrens" were considered inhospitable, and those that lived there were considered to be the dregs of society: fugitives, poachers, moonshiners, runaway slaves or deserting soldiers. Often poor, pineys were forced to make a living in any way possible. They collected and sold sphagnum moss or pine cones, hunted, fished, and lived off of the land. Some of the pineys included notorious bandits known as the Pine Robbers.

Pineys were further demonized after two eugenics studies in the early 20th century, which depicted them as congenital idiots and criminals, most notably the research performed on "The Kallikak Family" by Henry H. Goddard and Elizabeth Kite. In a 1939 guidebook, the Federal Writers' Project largely endorsed Kite's eugenicist and ahistorical depiction of Pineys, and added that "a staff correspondent of the Newark Evening News reported that U. S. Navy blimps must be careful in their flights over the area. The Piney bootleggers, suspecting that the low-flying blimps are seeking illicit stills, are quick on the trigger; frequently the small dirigibles return to Lakehurst from training flights with bullet holes in the fabric."

Pineys often fostered stories of how terrible the Pine Barrens are or how violent they were in order to discourage outsiders and law enforcement from entering the Barrens. The Jersey Devil stories often had this effect also. Today, pineys tend to wear the label as a badge of honor, much like the term "redneck" has been embraced in the Appalachian Mountains and the Southern United States.

== See also ==
- Ben-Ishmael Tribe
- Sandhillers
- Florida crackers
