= Jukes family =

New York family studied by sociologists

The Jukes family was a New York family studied in the late 19th and early 20th centuries. The studies are part of a series of other family studies, all of families with manufactured names including the Kallikaks, Nams and Hill Folk. These studies were often quoted as arguments in support of eugenics, though the original Jukes study by Richard L. Dugdale in 1874, placed considerable emphasis on the environment as a determining factor in criminality, disease and poverty (euthenics).

== Harris' reports ==
Elisha Harris, a doctor and former president of the American Public Health Association, published reports that Margaret, in Upstate New York, was the "mother of criminals" and he described her children as "a race of criminals, paupers and harlots".

== Dugdale's study ==
In 1874, sociologist Richard L. Dugdale, a member of the executive committee of the Prison Association of New York, and a colleague of Harris' was delegated to visit jails in upstate New York. In a jail in Ulster County, he found six members of the same "Jukes" family (a pseudonym), though they were using four different family names. On investigation, he found that of 29 male "immediate blood relations", 17 had been arrested and 15 convicted of crimes.

He studied the records of inmates of the 13 county jails in New York State, as well as poorhouses and courts, while researching the New York family's ancestry in an effort to find the basis for their criminality. His book claimed Max, a frontiersman who was the descendant of early Dutch settlers and who was born between 1720 and 1740, had been the ancestor of more than 76 convicted criminals, 18 brothel-keepers, 120 prostitutes, over 200 relief recipients, and two cases of "feeble-mindedness".

Many of the criminals could also be linked to "Margaret, the Mother of Criminals", renamed "Ada" in his report, who had married one of Max's sons. Dugdale created detailed genealogical charts and concluded that poverty, disease, rejection of religion, and criminality plagued the family. Dugdale estimated to the New York legislature that the family had cost the state $1,308,000. He published his findings in The Jukes: A Study in Crime, Pauperism, Disease and Heredity in 1877. Dugdale debated the relative contribution of environment and heredity and concluded that the family's poor environment was largely to blame for their behavior: "environment tends to produce habits which may become hereditary" (page 66). He noted that the Jukes were not a single family, but a composite of 42 families and that only 540 of his 709 subjects were apparently related by blood.

He urged public welfare changes and improvements in the environment in order to prevent criminality, poverty and disease (see: euthenics), writing: "public health and infant education... are the two legs upon which the general morality of the future must travel" (page 119). The book was widely read in the 19th century and stimulated discussion about the roles of heredity and environment. The term "Jukes" became, along with "Kallikaks" and "Nams" (other case studies of a similar nature), a cultural shorthand for the rural poor in the Southern and Northeastern United States. Legal historian Paul A. Lombardo states that very soon the Jukes family study was turned into a "genetic morality tale", which combined religious notions of the sins of the father and eugenic pseudoscience.

== Estabrook's study ==
A follow-up study was published by Arthur H. Estabrook of the Eugenics Record Office at Cold Spring Harbor, New York, in 1916 as The Jukes in 1915. Estabrook noted that Dugdale's conclusions were that the 1877 study "does not demonstrate the inheritance of criminality, pauperism, or harlotry, but it does show that heredity with certain environmental conditions determines criminality, harlotry, and pauperism". Estabrook reanalyzed Dugdale's data and updated it to include 2,820 persons, adding 2,111 Jukes to the 709 studied by Dugdale. He claimed that the living Jukes were costing the public at least $2,000,000.

Estabrook's data suggested that the family had actually shown fewer problems over time, but he pronounced that the Jukes family were "unredeemed" and suffering from just as much "feeblemindedness, indolence, licentiousness and dishonesty" as they had been in the past. Strongly emphasizing heredity, Estabrook's conclusions reversed Dugdale's argument about the environment, proposing that such families be prevented from reproducing, since no amount of environmental changes could alter their genetic inheritance towards criminality.

Photographs of members of the Jukes family and their homes, as well as family trees of some branches of the Jukes family, were displayed at the Second International Congress of Eugenics, held at the American Museum of Natural History in New York City in 1921. Historians have noted that Dugdale's conclusions have been misused by subsequent generations: "Estabrook's version is the one that carried the day. After 1915, the Jukes came to symbolize the futility of social change and the need for eugenic segregations and sterilization". American scientists, doctors, politicians, clergy and the legal profession all embraced the eugenic movement, and the Jukes family research was used as evidence in Buck v. Bell, a 1927 US Supreme Court case which made forced sterilizations legal in the United States. In the 1930s, eugenics was widely repudiated by geneticists, and after the Nazi eugenics program became known, its influence died out.

== Further research ==
Research in the 1960s pointed out fundamental problems with the studies, such as the subjects not being one family or necessarily related. In addition, the attempt to link a trait, such as poverty, to genetic makeup, ignoring environmental issues, has been "totally discredited", as noted by geneticist Andrés Ruiz Linares in a 2011 historical review. However, "the mythology of so-called 'genetically problematic families' is still with us," said Paul A. Lombardo of the Center for Biomedical Ethics at the University of Virginia. "Even today, the Jukeses seem to be getting a third life on the Internet as we see some religious and political groups invoking them as examples of inherited immorality."

In 2001, a poorhouse graveyard was discovered in New Paltz, in Ulster County, New York. Some of the unmarked graves belonged to members of the so-called Jukes family. Further information was found in the archives at the State University of New York at Albany and in records of a forgotten Ulster County poorhouse. A code book, labeled "classified", was found and listed the real surnames of the "Jukes" family. Hundreds of names were listed, including Plough, Miller, DuBois, Clearwater, Bank and Bush. Max, the "founder", was identified as Max Keyser.

== See also ==
- Dysgenics
- Educational attainment in the United States
- Environment and intelligence
- Fertility and intelligence
- Flynn effect
- Impact of health on intelligence
- The Kallikak family
