= Richard Louis Dugdale =

American merchant & sociologist (1841–1883)

Richard Louis Dugdale (1841 – 23 July 1883) was an American merchant and sociologist, best known for his 1877 family study, The Jukes: A Study in Crime, Pauperism, Disease and Heredity.

== Early life ==
Dugdale was born in Paris to English parents, and in 1851 moved with them to New York City and began working for a sculptor at the age of 14. Dugdale suffered from a congenital heart disease and the family moved to Indiana in 1858 in an effort to improve his health. The family returned to New York in 1860, and the following year his father died. Dugdale later worked in business as a stenographer while taking night courses at the Cooper Union. He became interested in social science but worked as a merchant and a manufacturer, hoping in the future to be able to devote himself full-time to his interest in sociology studies and social reform. Dugdale was described as a shy and humble man, who believed that good government was dependent on an educated, informed electorate. He was involved with several societies including The Society for Political Education, the New York Social Science Society, the New York Association for the Advancement of Science and the Arts, the New York Sociology Club, and the Civil Service Reform Association.

== Studying the "Jukes" ==
Dugdale became a member of the executive committee of the Prison Association of New York in 1868 and in 1874 was delegated to inspect thirteen county jails in upstate New York. Noticing that many of the inmates were related by blood or marriage, he self-funded a study of a family living in and around Ulster County, New York, whom he named "Jukes". Using local records and interviews he created detailed family trees and described the lives and histories of individual offenders, and then developed conclusions about what he believed were the causes of crime and dissipation. He reported his findings to the Prison Association in 1875 and published the widely read The Jukes: A Study in Crime, Pauperism, Disease and Heredity in 1877. Dugdale pioneered the use of science and scientific methods for the improvement of society, believing that studies that used objective methods would lead to the betterment of public policy and laws. His work marked a move away from religious-based explanations of social problems, and was lauded due to its use of fieldwork to answer questions of nature versus nurture in issues of crime, poverty and other social ills.

Dugdale's book has been interpreted as a eugenic tract by some readers and leaders of the eugenics movement. Others note that Dugdale was not a eugenicist and never suggested forced sterilization or other controls on reproduction. Instead, he believed that human behavior was influenced by both heredity and environment. He claimed that physiological disorders were the main cause of social problems, and that "training" could modify disposition and behavior. The conclusions he drew from his study were the need for penal reform, improved public health and early childhood education and care, all indications that he supported an environmentalist position. Dugdale also noted that the Jukes were a composite of 42 families and not a single group: only 540 of his 709 subjects appeared to be related by blood, and that his conclusions were tentative and inconclusive. Arthur H. Estabrook of the Eugenics Record Office published The Jukes in 1915, a follow-up study in 1916. Estabrook's eugenic reanalysis strongly emphasized heredity, and he reversed Dugdale's arguments about the environment, proposing controls on reproduction and other eugenics solutions, since he claimed no amount of environmental changes could alter their genetic inheritance towards criminality. Scholars have noted that Estabrook's analysis of the family "won the day".

Dugdale never married, and his health was fragile throughout his life. He suffered a breakdown in his late thirties and died of congenital heart disease in New York City on 23 July 1883 in his early forties.

Dugdale's papers are housed in the Special Collections of the Lloyd Sealy Library, John Jay College of Criminal Justice. The collections includes correspondence, the handwritten preface to an early edition of The Jukes, and large worksheets containing raw data on over 800 individuals from which Dugdale compiled the tables for his studies.

== Works ==
- "The Jukes": A Study in Crime, Pauperism, Disease and Heredity (1877)
