= Lucien Howe =

American ophthalmologist (1848 –1928)

- Born: September 18, 1848; Standish, Maine
- Died: December 27, 1928 (aged 80)
- Education: University at Buffalo
- Occupation: physician
- Known for: Buffalo Eye and Ear Infirmary

Lucien Howe (September 18, 1848 – December 27, 1928) was an American physician who spent much of his career as a professor of ophthalmology at the University at Buffalo. In 1876 he was instrumental in the creation of the Buffalo Eye and Ear Infirmary.

Howe is mainly remembered for his work in the prevention of blindness. In 1926 he established the Howe Laboratory at Harvard Medical School for research and study of biochemistry, genetics, neurobiology, and physiology concerning the eye. The American Ophthalmology Society names its most prestigious award—the Lucien Howe Medal after him. Howe was a catalyst in New York State for an 1890 statute sometimes called "The Howe Law," requiring application of silver nitrate drops in the eyes of newborns as a disinfectant to prevent neonatal infection and possible blindness.

Howe was also a major figure in support of eugenics. He believed that eugenics could be a tool in the fight against preventable blindness, specifically the small percentage of cases that were inherited. He theorized that by sterilizing the blind, inherited blindness could eventually be eradicated.

Howe was a member of the International Eugenic Congress's Committee on Immigration and president of the Eugenics Research Association. The eugenics movement sought to prevent the birth of "defectives" through regulation of marriage, involuntary sterilization, or segregation of potential parents deemed genetically inadequate. Howe supported and helped draft proposed legislation to prevent procreation by people with poor vision and by people whose relatives had poor vision. He even advocated imprisonment of blind people to keep them from reproducing. Howe conducted surveys of homes for the blind nationwide to gather family histories and identify people whose blindness was believed to be hereditary. Howe headed a committee of the American Medical Association, which collaborated with the Eugenics Record Office to register family "pedigrees" of blind people.

Leaders of the eugenics movement such as Harry Hamilton Laughlin regarded Howe's eugenics campaign against blindness as an opening wedge for a far more ambitious eugenics agenda, paving the way for broader measures against the birth of other babies with inherited "defects." Howe and his eugenicist colleagues sought to craft legislation that would pass constitutional muster. They believed that blindness, as a hygienic trait, would be an easier target for eugenics legislation than such "defective" traits as "feeblemindedness" or a family history of poverty.

Howe's own eugenics activism targeted more than blindness. He also proposed requiring a large cash bond from any marriage license applicant suspected of being "unfit." This bond, held till the wife reached the age of 45, would be used to defray any expenses the state incurred as a result of the couple's defective children. Howe opposed women’s suffrage and testified against the Nineteenth Amendment in Congress.
