= The Kallikak Family =

Eugenics book by Henry Herbert Goddard

The Kallikak Family: A Study in the Heredity of Feeble-Mindedness
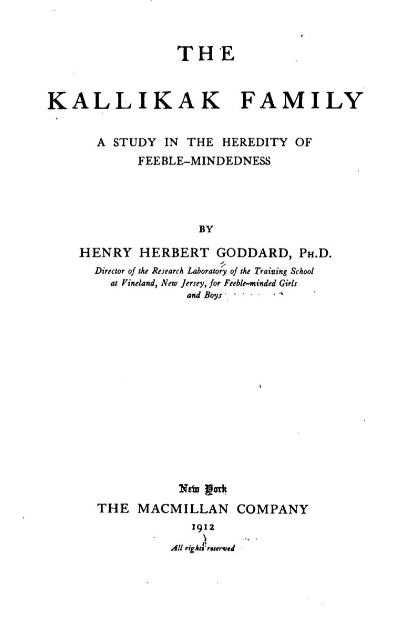
- Title page for The Kallikak Family: A Study in the Heredity of Feeble-Mindedness (1912)
- Author: Henry H. Goddard
- Language: English
- Publication date: 1912
- Publication place: United States

The Kallikak Family: A Study in the Heredity of Feeble-Mindedness was a 1912 book by the American psychologist and eugenicist Henry H. Goddard, dedicated to his patron Samuel Simeon Fels. Supposedly an extended case study of Goddard's for the inheritance of "feeble-mindedness", a general category referring to a variety of mental disabilities including intellectual disability, learning disabilities, and mental illness, the book is noted for factual inaccuracies that render its conclusions invalid. Goddard believed that a variety of mental traits were hereditary and that society should limit reproduction by people possessing these traits.

Nazi propagandists incorporated The Kallikak Family narrative into their efforts to legitimize forced sterilization in the early 1930s, eventually leading to the mass execution of tens of thousands of disabled German children and adults from 1939-1941; thus the book played a significant role in Nazi Germany’s eugenics movement under Adolf Hitler.

The name Kallikak is a pseudonym used as a family name throughout the book. Goddard coined the name from the Greek words καλός (kalos, good) and κακός (kakos, bad).

== Summary ==
The book begins by discussing the case of "Deborah Kallikak" (real name Emma Wolverton, 1889–1978), an ostensibly “feebleminded” woman held in lifelong involuntary custody, first at Goddard's institution, the New Jersey Home for the Education and Care of Feebleminded Children (now Vineland Training School), and subsequently, beginning at age 25, at the New Jersey State Institution for Feeble-Minded Women. In the course of investigating her supposed genealogy, Goddard claims to have discovered that her family tree bore a curious and surprising moral tale.

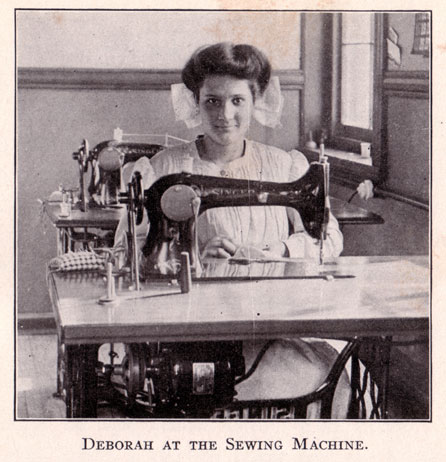
Goddard's book traced the genealogy of "Deborah Kallikak", a woman in his institution.

The book follows the genealogy of Martin Kallikak, Deborah's great-great-great grandfather, a Revolutionary War hero married to a Quaker woman. On his way back from battle the normally morally upright Martin dallied one time with a "feeble-minded" barmaid. He impregnated her and then abandoned her. The young Martin soon reformed and went on with his upright life, becoming a respected New England citizen and father of a large family of prosperous individuals. All of the children that came from this relationship were "wholesome" and had no signs of developmental disabilities.

But according to Goddard, a child was born by the dalliance with "the nameless feeble-minded girl". This single child, a male, called Martin Kallikak Jr. in the book (real name John Wolverton, 1776–1861), went on to father more children, who fathered their own children, and on and on down the generations. And so with the Kallikaks, Goddard claims to have discovered, one has as close as one could imagine an experiment in the hereditability of intelligence, moral ability, and criminality.

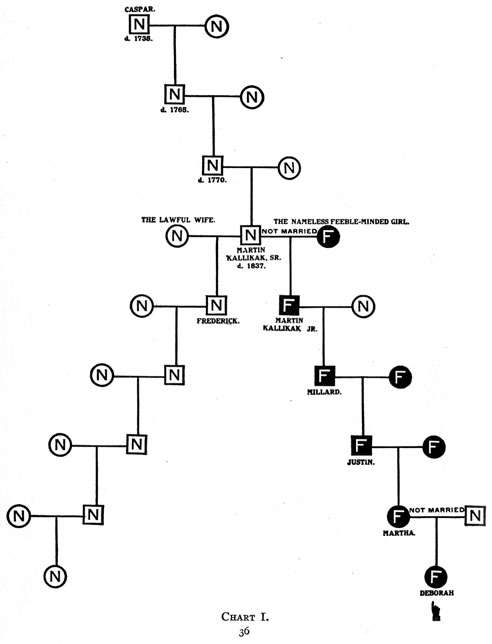
Goddard's Kallikak pedigree

On the "feeble-minded" side of the Kallikak family, descended from the abandoned single-parent barmaid, the children wound up poor, mentally ill, delinquent, and intellectually disabled. Deborah was, in Goddard's assessment, "feeble-minded": a catch-all early 20th century term to describe various forms of intellectual or learning disabilities. Goddard was interested in the heritability of "feeble-mindedness"—and often wrote of the invisible threat of recessive "feeble-minded" genes carried by otherwise healthy and intelligent looking members of the population (Mendel's laws had only been rediscovered a decade before; Goddard's genetic shorthand was, in its day, considered to be on par with cutting-edge science). It was in tracing the family history of Deborah that Goddard and his assistants discovered that Deborah's family of drunks and criminals was related—through Martin Kallikak—to another family tree of economy and prosperity.

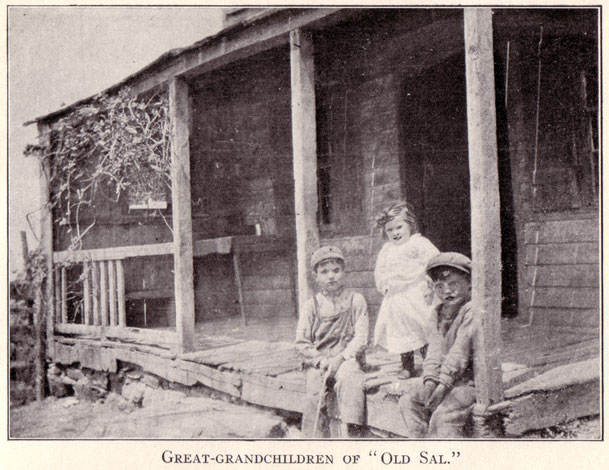
A set of Kallikak children on the "feeble-minded" side of the family

On the "normal" side of the Kallikak family tree, the children Martin had with his wife and their descendants all ended up prosperous, intelligent, and morally upstanding. They were lawyers, ministers, and doctors. None were "feeble-minded". Goddard concluded from this that intelligence, sanity, and morality were hereditary, and every effort should be undertaken to keep the 'feeble-minded' from procreating, with the overall goal of potentially ending 'feeble-mindedness' and its accompanying traits. The damage from even one dalliance between a young man and a "feeble-minded" woman could create generations and generations worth of crime and poverty, with its members eventually living off the generosity of the state (and consequently taxpayers), Goddard argued. His work contains intricately constructed family trees, showing near-perfect Mendelian ratios in the inheritance of negative and positive traits.

Goddard recommended segregating them in institutions, where they would be taught to perform various kinds of menial labor.

== Refutations ==
Researchers in a number of disciplines were already beginning to discredit the American eugenics movement amongst themselves by the time journalist Walter Lippmann initially cast public doubt on the very premise of The Kallikak Family in 1922; Lippmann argued that it had clearly failed to demonstrate “that this was a pure case of biological rather than social heredity.” The credibility of the work had been questioned as early as 1917, with particular criticism leveled at the speculative nature of the genealogical data.

Skepticism continued to mount as noted psychiatrist Abraham Myerson incredulously pointed out in 1922 the unlikelihood of any family line being all good or all bad: “Nothing like it is seen anywhere else. Everywhere else one finds, instead, good people breeding bad people and bad people breeding good people. Saints are descendants of prostitutes and prostitutes are sprung from the loins of saints, but not so with Martin Kallikak.” Myerson also took issue with Goddard’s claim that his field workers could instantly deem a person “feeble-minded” at a glance, saying, “I am frank to say that the matter is an unexplained miracle to me.”

In 1933 psychologist Stuart Stoke, too, challenged Goddard’s claim that “feeble-mindedness” could be diagnosed visually, and in addition he dismissed the evidence presented in The Kallikak Family as being extremely weak.

The Kallikak Family (and eugenics overall) continued to lose credibility as time went on, and the book was systematically debunked yet again, this time in 1944 by author Amram Scheinfeld. Scheinfeld, when pondering why it had not been widely discredited much earlier given its well-known flaws, states, “The answer is a simple one … there are persons everywhere who relish the thought that some groups, races, classes or strains are born to be superior and dominant, and that other groups are destined by nature to be inferior and subordinate.”

== Present-day evaluation ==
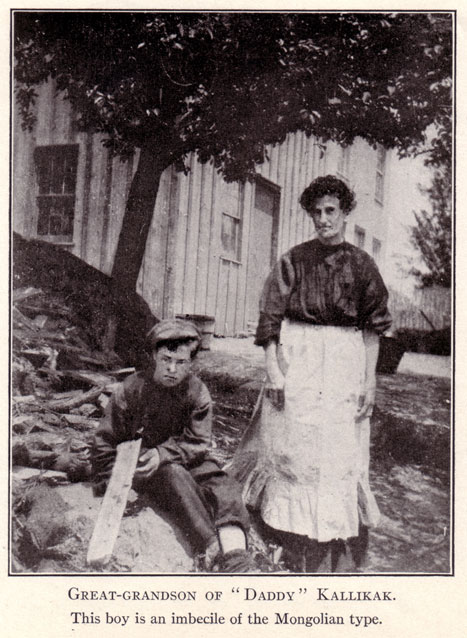
Two Kallikaks. It is possible that the boy was born with Down syndrome, a former name of the syndrome being mongolism.

In its day, The Kallikak Family was a tremendous success and went through multiple printings. It helped propel Goddard to the status of one of the nation's top experts in using psychology in policy, and along with the work of Charles B. Davenport and Madison Grant is considered one of the canonical works of early 20th-century American eugenics. As such, Goddard’s book was also, in the words of paleontologist and science writer Stephen Jay Gould, “the ‘primal myth of the eugenics movement’ that fueled the fire of the Nazi atrocities” inflicted on at least 80,000 German citizens with disabilities during the 1930s and 40s.

Research published in 2001 by David MacDonald and Nancy McAdams revealed that Goddard's account of the division of the Kallikak family into a "good" lineage—descended from Martin Kallikak Sr. and his wife—and a "bad" lineage—descended from Martin Kallikak Sr. and an unnamed feeble-minded barmaid—was fictitious. Martin Kallikak Jr., the supposedly illegitimate offspring of Martin Kallikak Sr. and the barmaid, was in fact the son of Gabriel Wolverton and his wife Catherine Murray. His real name was John Wolverton (1776–1861), and he was a landowner prosperous enough to buy two tracts of land for cash in 1809. Census records of 1850 show that all the adults in his household (which included Wolverton, one daughter, and several grandchildren) were able to read. The "bad" side of the Kallikak family included poor farmers but also school teachers, an Army Air Corps pilot, and a bank treasurer.

It has been argued, both in the past—even during the very time period when the “elaborate mythology” surrounding Emma Wolverton (“Deborah Kallikak”) was widely accepted—as well as in the present day, that the effects of malnutrition and other social deprivations were grossly overlooked and discounted in Goddard’s account of the Kallikak family: "’These were just poor people who lived in rural areas of New Jersey who were then cast into the quagmire of industrializing America at the turn of the 20th century,’ said [Michael] Wehmeyer,” coauthor of The Kallikak Family: A Study in the Heredity of Feeble-Mindedness.

Goddard's peer, Davenport, even identified various forms of diseases now known to be caused by diet deficiencies as being hereditary.

Another perspective has been offered that the Kallikaks almost certainly had undiagnosed fetal alcohol syndrome. In addition to poverty and malnourishment, prenatal alcohol exposure can create craniofacial and other physical anomalies that could account for their facial features. Furthermore, prenatal alcohol exposure may also damage the central nervous system, which can result in impaired cognitive and behavioral functioning similar to that described by Goddard.

=== Alteration of photographs ===
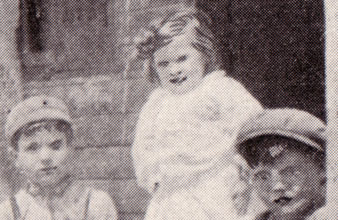
A detail of faces from the book—Stephen Jay Gould alleged that Goddard had doctored them to make them look more sinister.

Stephen Jay Gould advanced the view that Goddard—or someone working with him—had retouched the photographs used in his book in order to make the "bad" Kallikaks appear more menacing. In older editions of the books, Gould said, it has become clearly evident that someone had drawn in darker, "crazier" looking eyes and menacing faces on the children and adults in the pictures. Gould argues that photographic reproduction in books was still then a very new art, and that audiences would not have been as keenly aware of photographic retouching, even on such a crude level. The 14 photos were subsequently studied further to show the nature of the retouching and subsequent use to help make Goddard's points.

=== Influence ===
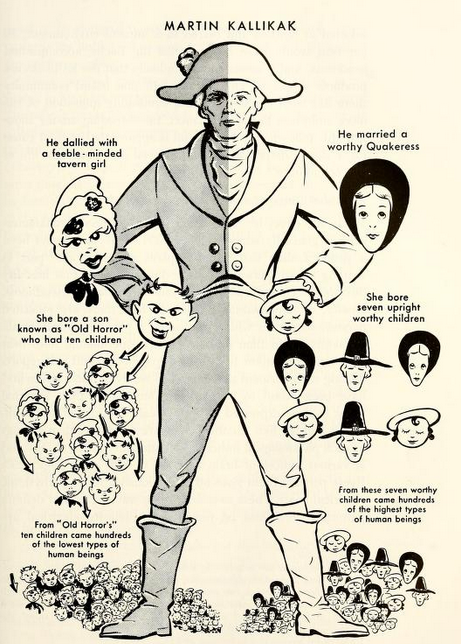
A caricature of the Kallikak Family from a 1950s psychology textbook. Modern research indicates that there is nothing accurate about the descriptions offered here.

The overall effect of The Kallikak Family was to temporarily increase funding to institutions such as Goddard's, but these were not seen to be worthwhile solutions of the problem of "feeble-mindedness" (much less "rogue" "feeble-mindedness"—the threat of idiocy as a recessive trait), and more stringent methods, such as compulsory sterilization of people with intellectual disabilities, were undertaken.

The term "Kallikak" became, along with "Jukes" and "Nams" (other case studies of similar natures), a cultural shorthand for the rural poor in the Southern and Northeastern United States.

In August 1977, NBC premiered a situation comedy called The Kallikaks, which depicted the comic misadventures of an Appalachian family that moved to California and feuded with another family named the Jukes; the series lasted only five episodes. A June 8, 1987, cartoon in The New Yorker provided a further update to the concept, depicting "The Jukes and Kallikaks Today".

In the book The Manchurian Candidate, Richard Condon makes an adjective of the Kallikak name in describing a country music song in the 1950s: "... a loudly lovable old standard out of Memphis, Tennessee, in which the rhyme of the proper name Betty Lou and the plural noun shoes were repeated, in a Kallikakian couplet, over and over again...."

== See also ==
- Brunner syndrome
- Carrie Buck
- Compulsory sterilization
- Critical thinking
- Degeneration theory
- Dysgenics
- Ecology
- Educational attainment in the United States
- Environment and intelligence
- Eudaimonia
- Eugenics
- Euphenics
- Euthenics
- Fertility and intelligence
- Flynn effect
- Home economics
- Impact of health on intelligence
- The Jukes family
- Robert F. Kennedy, Jr.
- Population health
- Social design
