= Dysgenics =

Decrease in genetic traits deemed desirable

Dysgenics refers to any decrease in the prevalence of traits deemed to be either socially desirable or generally adaptive to their environment due to selective pressure disfavouring their reproduction.

In 1915, the term was used by David Starr Jordan to describe the supposed deleterious effects of modern warfare on group-level genetic fitness because of its tendency to kill physically healthy men while preserving the disabled at home. Similar concerns had been raised by early eugenicists and social Darwinists during the 19th century, and continued to play a role in scientific and public policy debates throughout the 20th century.

More recent concerns about supposed dysgenic effects in human populations were advanced by the controversial psychologist and self-described scientific racist Richard Lynn, notably in his 1996 book Dysgenics: Genetic Deterioration in Modern Populations, which argued that changes in selection pressures and decreased infant mortality since the Industrial Revolution have resulted in an increased propagation of deleterious traits and genetic disorders.

Despite these concerns, genetic studies have shown no evidence for dysgenic effects in human populations. Reviewing Lynn's book, the scholar John R. Wilmoth notes: "Overall, the most puzzling aspect of Lynn's alarmist position is that the deterioration of average intelligence predicted by the eugenicists has not occurred."

== See also ==
- Degeneration theory – Concept from the 18th and 19th centuries
- Devolution (biology) – Notion that species can revert to primitive forms
- Evolutionary tradeoff – When evolution cannot enhance one trait without diminishing another
- Flynn effect – 20th-century rise in intelligence test scores
- Heritability of IQ – Percent of variation in IQ scores in a given population associated with genetic variation
- List of congenital disorders
- List of biological development disorders
- Recent human evolution – Biological evolution of Homo sapiens from 50,000 years ago until present
