= Eugenics Record Office =

Eugenics research institute at Cold Spring Harbor, New York

Coordinates: 40.85323°N 73.47304°W

The Eugenics Record Office (ERO), located in Cold Spring Harbor, New York, United States, was a research institute that gathered biological and social information about the American population, serving as a center for eugenics and human heredity research from 1910 to 1939. It was established by the Carnegie Institution of Washington (Carnegie Science), Station for Experimental Evolution, and subsequently administered by its Department of Genetics.

Both its founder, Charles Benedict Davenport, and its director, Harry H. Laughlin, were major contributors to the field of eugenics in the United States. Its mission was to collect substantial information on the ancestry of the American population, to produce literature fueling the eugenics movement, and to promote the idea of race betterment.

== History ==
The eugenics movement was popular and viewed as progressive in the early-twentieth-century United States. Charles Davenport was one of the leaders of this campaign and avidly believed that it was necessary to apply Mendelian Genetics principles to humans. Davenport's wife, Gertrude Davenport, was also an important figure in this movement and the establishment of the ERO. Gertrude Davenport was an embryologist and a geneticist who wrote papers with her husband supporting the idea that Mendelian genetics theories applied to humans.

Supported by the argument that the eugenics office would collect information for human genetics research, Davenport convinced the Carnegie Institute to establish the ERO. He was well connected to wealthy people during the time and he lobbied them to finance his vision of the ERO. The ERO was financed primarily by Mary Harriman (widow of railroad baron E. H. Harriman and mother of W. Averell Harriman), the Rockefeller Foundation, and the Carnegie Institution. In 1935, Carnegie sent a team to review the ERO's work and as a result of their findings, ordered ERO to stop all work on their behalf. In 1939 the Carnegie Institution's new president, Vannevar Bush, forced Laughlin's retirement and withdrew funding for the ERO entirely, forcing its closure by the end of that year.

Superintendent Harry H. Laughlin, formerly a school superintendent in Iowa, held a position akin to that of an assistant director of the ERO. Charles Davenport appointed Laughlin as a head of the ERO due to Laughlin's extensive knowledge about breeding and the implementation of this knowledge in humans. Under the direction of Laughlin, the ERO advocated laws that led to the forced sterilization of many Americans it categorized as 'socially inadequate'.

The endeavors of the Eugenics Record Office were facilitated by the work of various committees. The Committee on Inheritance of Mental Traits included among its members Robert M. Yerkes and Edward L. Thorndike. The Committee on Heredity of Deafmutism included Alexander Graham Bell. Harry H. Laughlin was on the Committee on Sterilization, and the Committee on the Heredity of the Feeble Minded included, among others, Henry Herbert Goddard. Other prominent board members included scientists like Irving Fisher, William E. Castle, and Adolf Meyer.

In the 1920s, the ERO merged with the Station for Experimental Evolution and adopted the name of the Department of Genetics of the Carnegie Institute.

Eventually, the ERO closed in December 1939 in part due to the disapproval it received. The information that had been collected by the ERO was distributed amongst other genetic research based organizations and collections services.

The ERO's reports, articles, charts, and pedigrees were considered scientific facts in their day, but have since been discredited. In 1944, its records were transferred to the Charles Fremont Dight Institute for the Promotion of Human Genetics at the University of Minnesota. When the Dight Institute closed in 1991, the genealogical material was filmed by the Genealogical Society of Utah and given to the Center for Human Genetics. The non-genealogical material was not filmed and was given to the American Philosophical Society Library. The American Philosophical Society has a copy of the microfilm as well. Today, Cold Spring Harbor Laboratory maintains the full historical records, communications and artifacts of the ERO for historical, teaching and research purposes. The documents are housed in a campus archive and can be accessed online and in a series of multimedia websites.

== Methods ==
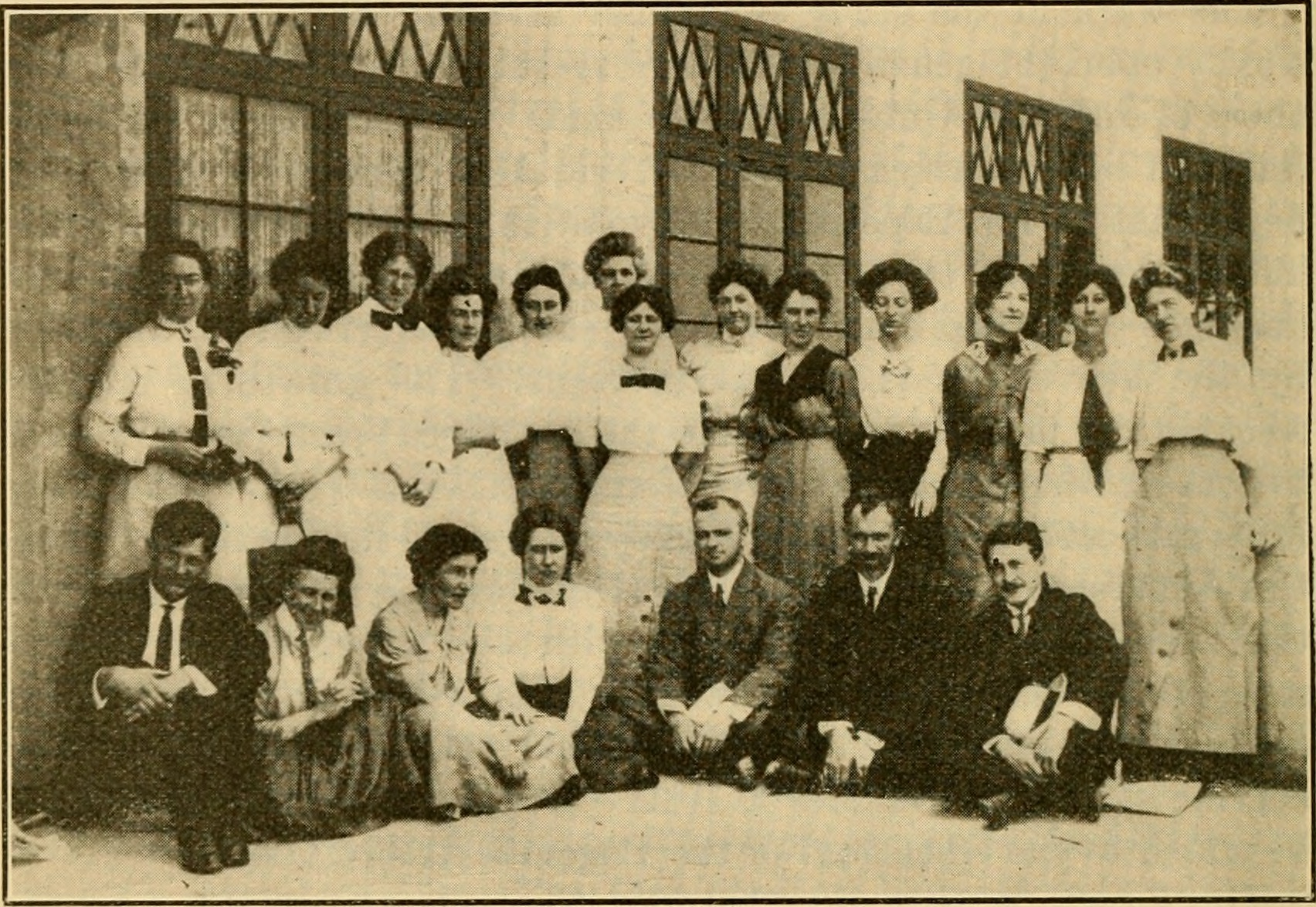
First Annual Field Workers' Conference, Eugenics Record Office, 1912

The ERO collected research mostly through questionnaires. These questionnaires asked questions which described the characteristics of individual people and their families. These characteristics ranged from physical to temperamental properties. Many of these questionnaires were collected by field workers, usually educated women (who had few other jobs open to them), who would go door-to-door asking people to fill out this information. Many of these women had bachelor's degrees in biology, and graduate school degrees were not uncommon. Additionally, the ERO had other methods of collecting these questionnaires such as sending them through the mail, and promoting them as methods for families to learn about their genetic lineage and family history.

The research collected by these field workers provided much of the information which facilitated the passage of several laws during the 1920s.

The ERO disseminated its information and its message via a variety of outlets. These included a journal called Eugenical News, posters with propaganda full messages about intelligent breeding, and pamphlets with information on the movement.

== Controversy ==
Eugenics was and continues to be a controversial issue due to the pressure radical eugenicists put on the government to pass legislation that would restrict the liberties of the people who had traits that could be considered undesirable. Specifically, the ERO dedicated its resources to the restriction of immigrants and the forced sterilization of individuals deemed to have undesirable characteristics. They promoted their ideas through the distribution of propaganda that came in the form of images and information packets.

Something else that caused tension within and surrounding the ERO was Harry H. Laughlin's radical policy suggestions. He was known for presenting fraudulent evidence to support policies of forced sterilization and was known for dogmatism. For instance, after being appointed to House committee for immigration, Harry H. Laughlin attempted to convince the committee that there were lower quality genes coming from southern and eastern parts of Europe. Consequently, the Johnson-Reed Act was passed in 1924 which prevented immigration from these areas. Harry Laughlin also advocated for compulsory sterilization on the state level. Over 35 states approved of these laws and numerous people were sterilized before the laws were repealed. Furthermore, the rise of Nazism in the 1930s and their use of and belief in eugenics led to opposition to the American program. The ERO finally being closed in 1939. Harry Laughlin's policies were used in Germany where forced sterilization laws were passed. The result of these laws led to the sterilization of 400,000 individuals. Adolf Hitler also referred to American eugenics in his memoir, Mein Kampf. He claimed non-Aryan races to be subordinate and compulsory sterilization was justified in his view as a result.

Many government officials who were proponents of the ERO sought to implement forced sterilization laws. For example, Menendez Ramos, governor of Puerto Rico in the 1930s, established sterilization laws for Puerto Rican women. The intent was to battle generational poverty and increase economic utility among Puerto Ricans. Some historians say these laws were implemented in order to supposedly prevent the gene pool from being pervaded by Latino blood. In addition, in 1927, the U.S. Supreme Court claimed that sterilizing disabled citizens does not violate the Constitution. While these laws were ultimately repealed, a large number of individuals had been already sterilized. Moreover, during the eugenics era, California lawmakers forcibly sterilized thousands of individuals in mental health facilities. The goal was to prevent the spread of mental illness in the following generations. Some children were allegedly denied healthcare unless their mothers were forcibly sterilized as well.

Many academics criticized the ERO. Herbert Spencer Jennings from Johns Hopkins University criticized Laughlin's data which was used to justify restrictions on immigration. Other critics challenged the claims of eugenicists that there was a genetic influence from certain groups of people. For example, anthropologist Franz Boas from Columbia University claimed that Laughlin used racism masquerading as science.

Many scholars criticized how data was obtained and further used to justify the claims from the Eugenics Record Office. Major criticism came from the Galton Laboratory. Critics mentioned data obtained by eugenicists lacked an approach free from bias. They also claimed the data did not match Mendelian genetics. For instance, one main critique was the labeling of heterozygotes. Heterozygotes were sometimes labeled intermediate, while other times heterozygotes were labeled normal. According to the Galton Laboratory, the inconsistency in data showed the carelessness of their approach. Furthermore, a major critic of eugenics, A. M. Carr-Saunders of Britain, mentioned eugenicists were incapable of providing a distinction between biological heredity and the environment. He claimed social factors were largely dismissed by eugenicists.

Economist Joseph M. Gillman criticized the statistical analysis and research methodology of the ERO's work, arguing that there were rudimentary statistics errors, as well as selection bias. For instance, Harry H. Laughlin asserted that various forms of "degeneracy" were innate to certain racial groups of recent immigrants by looking at populations in asylums and homes for the disabled. However, he failed to account for the fact that racial groups of older immigrant communities were more likely to take care of their disabled at home rather than place them in institutions, which was not the case for smaller recent immigrant groups who may not have family in the country to take care of them. Gillman wrote that the errors were so rudimentary that,

what prompted both these gentlemen to commit these errors was apparently their intense desire, of one to associate with, and of the other to dissociate from race the incidence of the various social inadequacies. Facts were therefore selected in such a manner and the methods of interpretation were so chosen as to yield the desired support for their preconceived conclusions.

Although the ERO and eugenics movement was prominent in the early to mid twentieth century, many of the initial philosophies remained. In a 1976 investigation, the Government Accountability Office found that over 25 percent of Native Americans were forcibly sterilized in the early 1970s. Additionally, in China, many Chinese geneticists sought to improve population quality. Beginning in the 1990s, some Chinese government officials sought to eliminate those with opposing moral values which tend to be influenced by the Buddhist and Taoist religions.
