= Eugenics =

Effort to improve purported human genetic quality

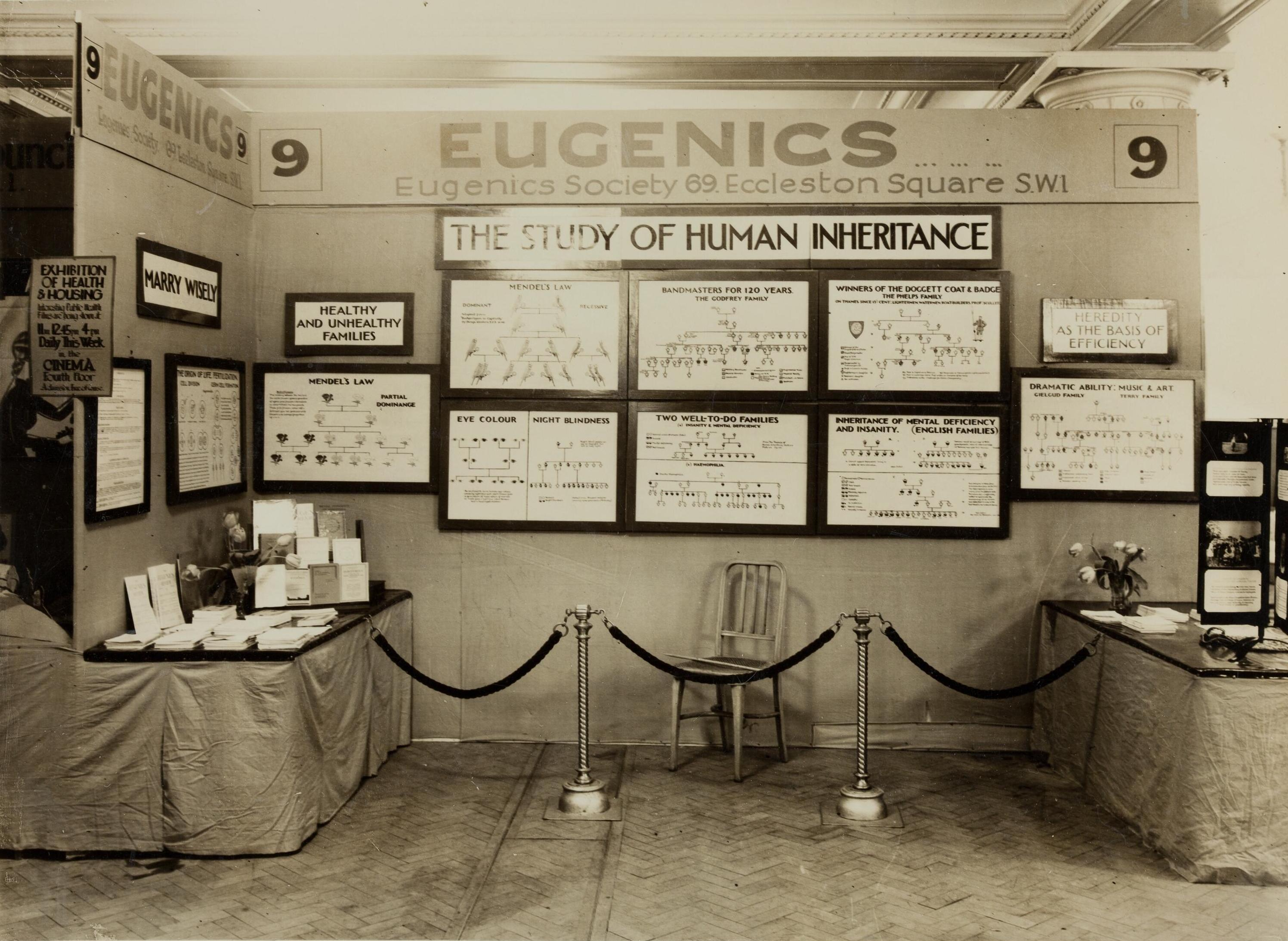
1930s exhibit by the Eugenics Society. Some of the signs read "Healthy and Unhealthy Families", "Heredity as the Basis of Efficiency", and "Marry Wisely".

Eugenics (Note: /juːˈdʒɛnɪks/ yoo-JEN-iks; from Ancient Greek εύ̃ (eû) 'good, well' and -γενής (genḗs) 'born, come into being, growing/grown') is a largely discredited set of beliefs and practices that aim to improve the genetic quality of a human population. Historically, eugenicists have attempted to alter the frequency of various human phenotypes by inhibiting the fertility of those considered inferior, often through forced sterilization, or promoting that of those considered superior.

The term "eugenics" predates genetics; "eugenics" was coined by Francis Galton in 1883, whereas "genetics" was proposed as a scientific discipline in 1906.

The contemporary history of eugenics began in the late 19th century, following the emergence of the theory of evolution and natural selection. A popular eugenics movement emerged in the United Kingdom, and spread to most European countries (e.g., Sweden and Germany), and many other countries, including the United States, Canada, and Australia.

Historically, the idea of eugenics has been used to argue for a broad array of practices ranging from prenatal care for mothers deemed genetically desirable to the forced sterilisation and murder of those deemed unfit. To population geneticists, the term has included the avoidance of inbreeding without altering allele frequencies; for example, British-Indian scientist J. B. S. Haldane wrote in 1940 that "the motor bus, by breaking up inbred village communities, was a powerful eugenic agent." Debate as to what qualifies as eugenics continues today.

A progressive social movement promoting eugenics had originated in the 19th century, with diverse support, but by the mid 20th century the term was closely associated with scientific racism and authoritarian coercion. With modern medical genetics, genetic testing and counselling have become common, and new or liberal eugenics rejects coercive programmes in favour of individual parental choice.

== Philosophy ==
=== Background and circumstances ===
Eugenics emerged and became popular in the late 19th and early 20th centuries because of factors affecting science that made it possible and because of the concerns of society at that time. For example, early in the 19th century, many European governments began collecting and aggregating data from institutions, which ended up enabling early studies of criminal behavior using statistics. In the early 20th century, statistical methods aiming to quantify human traits were created, such as Alfred Binet's test for measuring the cognitive ability of schoolchildren, which would later be adapted into the IQ test.

In Britain, the end of the Victorian era brought new anxieties about whether Britain's prosperity would continue as other countries became industrialized. People perceived a threat to the future of the British "race" due to falling birth rates, especially among the upper class. Panic about low fertility among the upper classes of Britain made eugenics explode into a popular social movement, especially among the middle class, which may have been especially attracted to ideas of inborn superiority as a birthright due to its "unsettled" position in society.

Likewise, nearing the turn of the twentieth century in the United States, people were concerned with the impacts of industrialization, urbanization, and high rates of immigration. In the minds of eugenicists, scientific advances provided a new possibility of rational ways to understand human behavior, and therefore build a better world based upon science. Early eugenicists developed their ideas from observing the social problems of their time and explaining them according to the trend in science of the time, which was to attribute human problems to biological causes.

Eugenics emerged from the context of Social Darwinism, which explained inequality as natural and part of the mechanism of "survival of the fittest". The conditions observed in the impoverished and unhealthy industrialized urban centers led people to fear that "inferior" people would not naturally die out, as Social Darwinism suggested, and instead would increase in population at higher rates in a modern, industrialized world. Early centers of eugenicist thought had different focuses due to their unique circumstances. In Germany, eugenics explained "inferiority" through a medicalized framework. In Britain, class was a main concern: the population of poor people was increasing, and eugenics provided a biological explanation for the perceived mental and physical defects of the poor. In the United States, eugenics targeted "feeble-minded" people and immigrants. There was a large anti-immigration movement in the United States starting in the 1880s and peaking in the 1920s, driven by fears that white Anglo-Saxon bloodlines and values were degenerating and that immigrants were causing disease, crime, and poverty. In the United States, the medicalized category of the "feeble-minded" served as a way to incarcerate women who were promiscuous or had sex outside of marriage by defining their behavior as abnormal within a scientific framework.

=== Scope ===
Eugenics included in its scope many disciplines, including medicine, public health, psychiatry, sociology, criminology, and anthropology. What united these fields under the philosophy of eugenics was the idea that the causes of social problems were biological and heritable.

Founding eugenicists, such as Francis Galton and Charles Davenport, developed the foundational idea that intellectual, mental, and moral capacities, like physical traits, were heritable according to Mendelian principles. Therefore, eugenicists viewed disability, psychiatric illness, and criminality as being similar, causally connected, overlapping, or interchangeable phenomena. At the end of the 19th century, explanations of crime switched dramatically from social to biological. The concept of "moral insanity" was popular in psychiatry in the late nineteenth and early twentieth centuries, and was part of a movement that sought to explain crime by attributing it to psychiatric illness. Cesare Lombroso, often considered the "father of criminology", argued using the now-debunked science of phrenology that physical traits of the body were correlated to criminal behavior, and argued that these physical abnormalities were signs of atavism, a backward evolutionary regression to an animal-like state. This idea influenced the "positivist" school of criminological thought, which held that “social deviance” was like disease in that it had biological explanations within the person. According to Enrico Ferri, a prominent writer among the "positivists", the only way to stop crime was to identify the subset of people that were innately, biologically predisposed to be criminals, and imprison them before they could harm society. Criminals, people with mental or physical disabilities, and people with mental illnesses were regarded as "degenerates", people whose genetic quality had deteriorated and who posed a threat to society if they were to reproduce and pass down their inferior traits. Adherents of "degeneracy theory" believed that rehabilitation of "degenerates" was pointless, since "degeneration" was biological, but also believed that social conditions like poverty could create "degenerate" traits which could in turn be inherited by offspring.

=== Goals ===
Eugenics as a movement arose through the merging of scientific study, philosophical ideas about improving humanity, and politics.

Central to eugenics was the concept of race. Up until the late twentieth century, "race" was seen as a scientific term for differentiating people based upon belonging to different ethnic groups or sharing certain characteristics. "Racial" betterment or improvement of the "race" was seen as the goal of eugenics. However, eugenicists used the term "race" inconsistently, using "race" to refer to both the entire human race and to individual "ethnic groups" thought to share traits. In the early twentieth century, many eugenicists envisioned a white "Anglo-Saxon" or "Nordic" race that was superior to all other groups, and feared that this superior race would be threatened.

All eugenicists agreed that some people were inferior and others superior, but different strains of eugenicist thinking were differentiated by what their idea of "race improvement" meant.

== Viewpoints ==
=== Perspectives on heredity ===
Though the founders of eugenicist thought broadly shared the idea that humankind could improve itself by influencing which people reproduced and passed down their traits to subsequent generations, early eugenicists were unclear on how heredity worked. Proponents of the idea of degeneracy, such as Bénédict Augustin Morel, believed that non-inherited traits acquired by people due to bad living conditions or unhealthy habits could become hereditary and be passed down to offspring. This concept of heredity has now been largely disproven. By 1915, geneticists knew that Mendelian inheritance governed heredity, but among other fields of biology such as ecology, paleontology, systematics, and embryology, the notion of acquired traits being heritable persisted into the 1930s and 1940s.

=== Effects of war ===
Eugenicists disagreed on whether war had eugenic or dysgenic effects. Charles Darwin thought that war had a positive effect on humanity, allowing supposedly superior people to destroy supposedly inferior people through conquest. Some eugenicists conceived of the possibility of a "eugenic war", in which members of the population judged as mentally and physically inferior could be sent to the front lines as "cannon fodder" to be killed.

After World War I, perspectives on war became much more negative. Many eugenicists discussed the negative impacts of war upon the genetic quality of a population, since the fittest and most able young men were sent to war, and many were either killed or returned with disabilities and "wartime neuropsychoses". Some eugenicists perceived the dysgenic impact of the First World War to be so devastating, in fact, that they expressed despair over the future of eugenics. Some noted that military service seemed to correlate with increased family sizes, and argued that war and the associated spread of disease could eliminate the weak from a population. Ignaz Kaup and Alfred Ploetz saw the mass starvation in Germany during the first World War as eugenic. However, World War I broadly dashed eugenicist hopes of war as a humanity-improving force, and sparked a new wave of popularity for eugenics as people became more concerned about the damaging impacts of war on populations.

=== Positive and negative eugenics ===
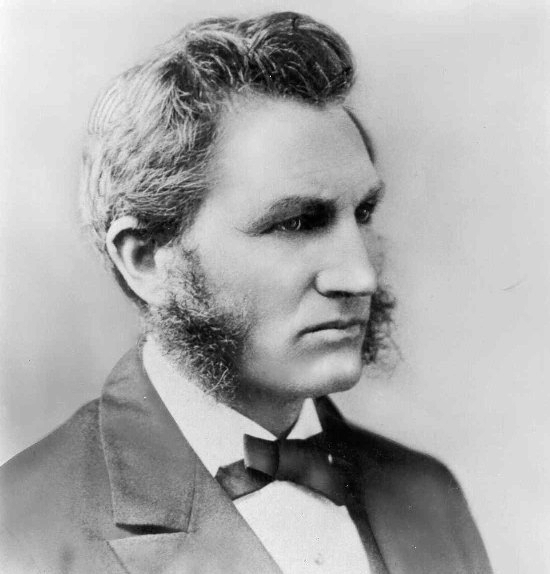
Lester Frank Ward wrote the early paper: "Eugenics, Euthenics and Eudemics", making yet further distinctions.

Eugenic programmes included both positive measures, such as encouraging individuals deemed particularly "fit" to reproduce, and negative measures, such as marriage prohibitions and forced sterilisation of people deemed unfit for reproduction.

Positive eugenics is aimed at encouraging reproduction among the genetically advantaged, for example, the intelligent, the healthy, and the successful. Possible approaches include financial and political stimuli, targeted demographic analyses, in vitro fertilisation, egg transplants, and cloning. Negative eugenics aimed to eliminate, through sterilisation or segregation, those deemed physically, mentally, or morally undesirable. This includes abortions, sterilisation, and other methods of family planning. Both positive and negative eugenics can be coercive; in Nazi Germany, for example, abortion was illegal for women deemed by the state to be superior.

=== Relationship with "euthenics" ===
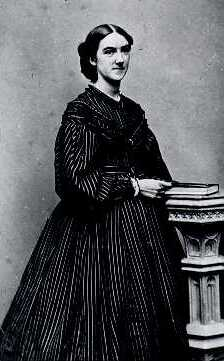
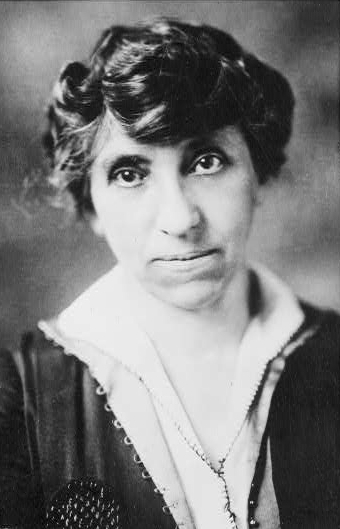
Ellen Swallow Richards (left), the first female student and instructor at MIT, was one of the first to use the term, while Julia Clifford Lathrop (right) continued to promote it in the form of an interdisciplinary academic program later to be mostly absorbed into the field of home economics.

Euthenics (/juːˈθɛnɪks/) is the study of the improvement of human functioning and well-being by the improvement of living conditions. "Improvement" is conducted by altering external factors such as education and the controllable environments, including environmentalism, education regarding employment, home economics, sanitation, and housing, as well as the prevention and removal of contagious disease and parasites.

In a New York Times article dated May 23, 1926, Rose Field notes of the description, "the simplest [is] efficient living". It is also described as "a right to environment", commonly as dual to a "right of birth" that correspondingly falls under the purview of eugenics.

In contrast to eugenics, euthenics does not intentionally attempt to alter the composition of the human gene pool. However, improvements to one's quality of life, such as eradication of diseases or access to proper nutrition, can potentially have indirect effects on the genetics of the population.

The influential historian of education Abraham Flexner questions its scientific value in stating:

[T]he "science" is artificially pieced together of bits of mental hygiene, child guidance, nutrition, speech development and correction, family problems, wealth consumption, food preparation, household technology, and horticulture. A nursery school and a school for little children are also included. The institute is actually justified in an official publication by the profound question of a girl student who is reported as asking, "What is the connection of Shakespeare with having a baby?" The Vassar Institute of Euthenics bridges this gap!

Eugenicist Charles Benedict Davenport noted in his article "Euthenics and Eugenics", reprinted in Popular Science Monthly:

Thus the two schools of euthenics and eugenics stand opposed, each viewing the other unkindly. Against eugenics it is urged that it is a fatalistic doctrine and deprives life of the stimulus toward effort. Against euthenics the other side urges that it demands an endless amount of money to patch up conditions in the vain effort to get greater efficiency. Which of the two doctrines is true?

The thoughtful mind must concede that, as is so often the case where doctrines are opposed, each view is partial, incomplete and really false. The truth does not exactly lie between the doctrines; it comprehends them both.

[...] [I]n the generations to come, the teachings and practice of euthenics [...] [may] yield greater result because of the previous practice of the principles of eugenics.

Along similar lines, Edward L. Thorndike, a psychologist and early intelligence researcher, argued some two years later for an understanding that better integrates eugenic study:

The more rational the race becomes, the better roads, ships, tools, machines, foods, medicines and the like it will produce to aid itself, though it will need them less. The more sagacious and just and humane the original nature that is bred into man, the better schools, laws, churches, traditions and customs it will fortify itself by. There is no so certain and economical a way to improve man's environment as to improve his nature.

== Historical eugenics ==
=== Ancient and medieval origins ===
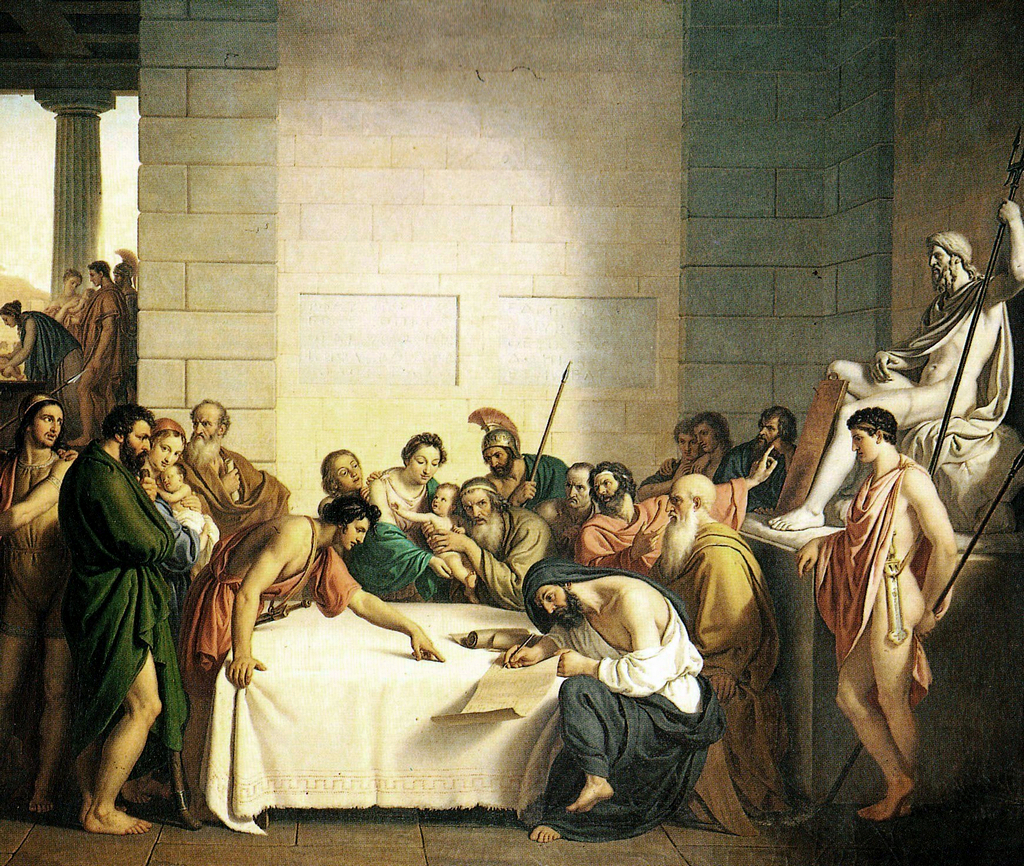
Giuseppe Diotti's The selection of the infant Spartans (1840)

In ancient Sparta, according to Plutarch (c. 50 – c. 120), the council of elders (the Gerousia) inspected every proper citizen's child and determined whether or not the child was fit to live. A child deemed unfit was allegedly thrown into a chasm. Plutarch's account is the sole historical source for the Spartan practice of infanticide motivated by eugenics. While ancient Greeks practiced infanticide, no contemporary sources support Plutarch's claims of infanticide on eugenic grounds. In 2007, the tradition of dumping infants near Mount Taygete was called into question due to a lack of physical evidence: anthropologist Theodoros Pitsios' research of the site found only bodies ranging in age from 18 to 35 years.

Plato's political philosophy included the belief that the state should cautiously monitor and control human reproduction through selective breeding.

According to Tacitus (c. 56 – c. 120), a Roman of the Imperial Period, the Germanic tribes of his day killed any member of their community they deemed cowardly, un-warlike or "stained with abominable vices", usually by drowning them in swamps. Modern historians regard Tacitus' ethnographic writing as unreliable in such details.

=== Academic origins ===
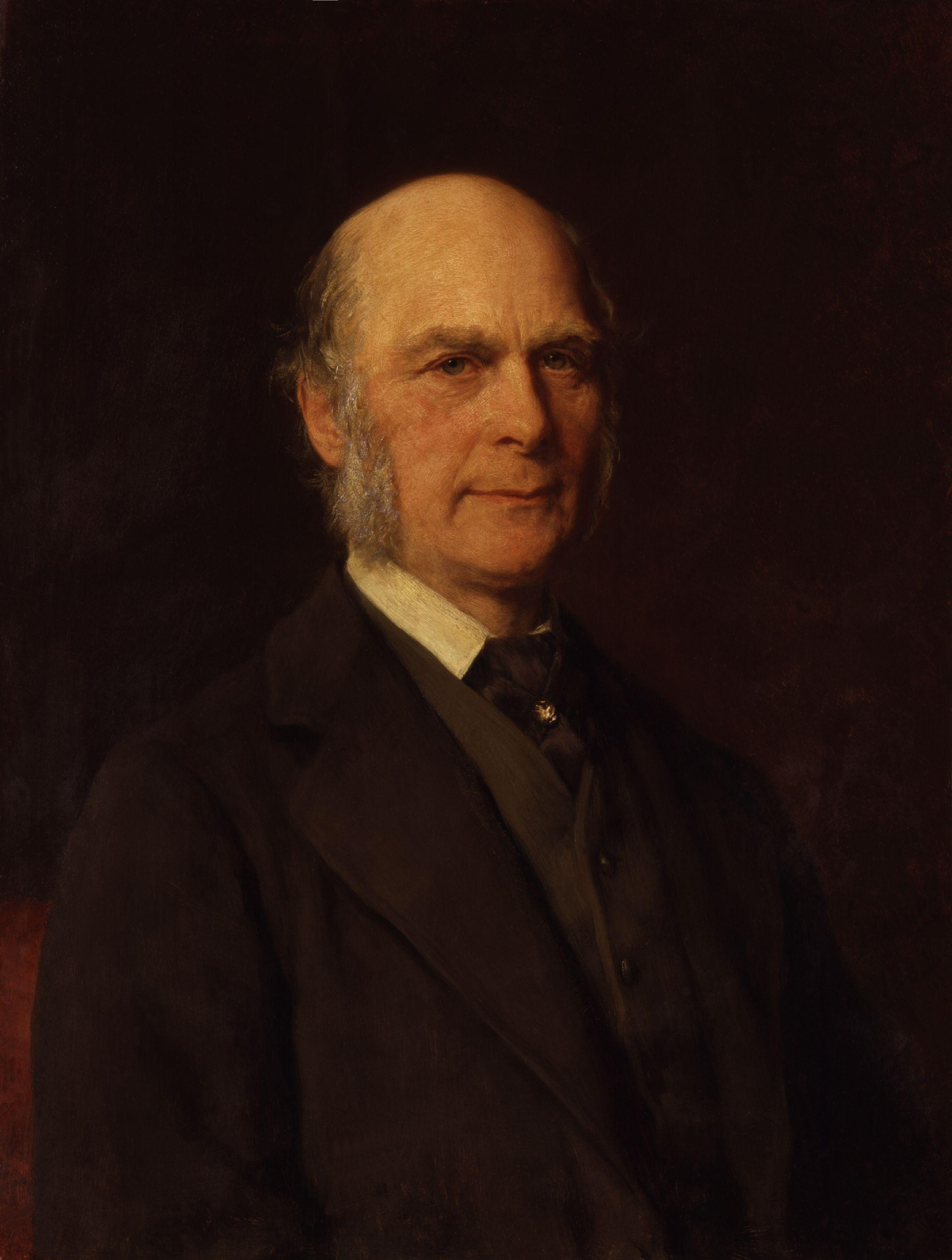
Francis Galton (1822–1911) was a British polymath who coined the term "eugenics"

The term eugenics and its modern field of study were first formulated by Francis Galton in 1883, (Note: He concretely intended it to replace the word "stirpiculture", which he had used previously but which had come to be mocked due to its perceived sexual overtones.) directly drawing on the recent work delineating natural selection by his half-cousin Charles Darwin. (Note: Though the origins of the concept also had to do with certain interpretations of Mendelian inheritance and the theories of August Weismann.) He published his observations and conclusions chiefly in his influential book Inquiries into Human Faculty and Its Development. Galton himself defined it as "the study of all agencies under human control which can improve or impair the racial quality of future generations". The first to systematically apply Darwinism theory to human relations, Galton believed that various desirable human qualities were also hereditary ones, although Darwin strongly disagreed with this elaboration of his theory.

Eugenics became an academic discipline at many colleges and universities and received funding from various sources. Organisations were formed to win public support for and to sway opinion towards responsible eugenic values in parenthood, including the British Eugenics Education Society of 1907 and the American Eugenics Society of 1921. Both sought support from leading clergymen and modified their message to meet religious ideals. In 1909, the Anglican clergymen William Inge and James Peile both wrote for the Eugenics Education Society. Inge was an invited speaker at the 1921 International Eugenics Conference, which was also endorsed by the Roman Catholic Archbishop of New York Patrick Joseph Hayes.

Three International Eugenics Conferences presented a global venue for eugenicists, with meetings in 1912 in London, and in 1921 and 1932 in New York City. Eugenic policies in the United States were first implemented by state-level legislators in the early 1900s. Eugenic policies also took root in France, Germany, and Great Britain. Later, in the 1920s and 1930s, the eugenic policy of sterilising certain mental patients was implemented in other countries including Belgium, Brazil, Canada, Japan and Sweden.

Frederick Osborn's 1937 journal article "Development of a Eugenic Philosophy" framed eugenics as a social philosophy—a philosophy with implications for social order. That definition is not universally accepted. Osborn advocated for higher rates of sexual reproduction among people with desired traits ("positive eugenics") or reduced rates of sexual reproduction or sterilisation of people with less-desired or undesired traits ("negative eugenics").

In addition to being practiced in a number of countries, eugenics was internationally organised through the International Federation of Eugenics Organisations. Its scientific aspects were carried on through research bodies such as the Kaiser Wilhelm Institute of Anthropology, Human Heredity, and Eugenics, the Cold Spring Harbor Carnegie Institution for Experimental Evolution, and the Eugenics Record Office. Politically, the movement advocated measures such as sterilisation laws. In its moral dimension, eugenics rejected the doctrine that all human beings are born equal and redefined moral worth purely in terms of genetic fitness. Its racist elements included pursuit of a pure "Nordic race" or "Aryan" genetic pool and the eventual elimination of "unfit" races.

Many leading British politicians subscribed to the theories of eugenics. Winston Churchill supported the British Eugenics Society and was an honorary vice president for the organisation. Churchill believed that eugenics could solve "race deterioration" and reduce crime and poverty.

As a social movement, eugenics reached its greatest popularity in the early decades of the 20th century, when it was practiced around the world and promoted by governments, institutions, and influential individuals. Many countries enacted various eugenics policies, including: genetic screenings, birth control, promoting differential birth rates, marriage restrictions, segregation (both racial segregation and sequestering the mentally ill), compulsory sterilisation, forced abortions or forced pregnancies, ultimately culminating in genocide. By 2014, gene selection (rather than "people selection") was made possible through advances in genome editing, leading to what is sometimes called new eugenics, also known as "neo-eugenics", "consumer eugenics", or "liberal eugenics"; which focuses on individual freedom and allegedly pulls away from racism, sexism or a focus on intelligence.

==== Early opposition ====
Early critics of the philosophy of eugenics included the American sociologist Lester Frank Ward, the English writer G. K. Chesterton, and Scottish tuberculosis pioneer and author Halliday Sutherland. (Note: He had identified eugenicists as a major obstacle to the eradication and cure of tuberculosis in his 1917 address "Consumption: Its Cause and Cure",) Ward's 1913 article "Eugenics, Euthenics, and Eudemics", Chesterton's 1917 book Eugenics and Other Evils, and Franz Boas' 1916 article "Eugenics" (published in The Scientific Monthly) were all harshly critical of the rapidly growing movement.

Several biologists were also antagonistic to the eugenics movement, including Lancelot Hogben. Other biologists who were themselves eugenicists, such as J. B. S. Haldane and R. A. Fisher, however, also expressed scepticism in the belief that sterilisation of "defectives" (i.e. a purely negative eugenics) would lead to the disappearance of undesirable genetic traits.

Among institutions, the Catholic Church opposes sterilisation for eugenic purposes. Attempts by the Eugenics Education Society to persuade the British government to legalise voluntary sterilisation were opposed by Catholics and by the Labour Party. The American Eugenics Society initially gained some Catholic supporters, but Catholic support declined following the 1930 papal encyclical Casti connubii. In this, Pope Pius XI explicitly condemned sterilisation laws: "Public magistrates have no direct power over the bodies of their subjects; therefore, where no crime has taken place and there is no cause present for grave punishment, they can never directly harm, or tamper with the integrity of the body, either for the reasons of eugenics or for any other reason."

The eugenicists' political successes in Germany and Scandinavia were not at all matched in such countries as Poland and Czechoslovakia, even though measures had been proposed there, largely because of the Catholic Church's moderating influence.

=== Eugenic feminism ===
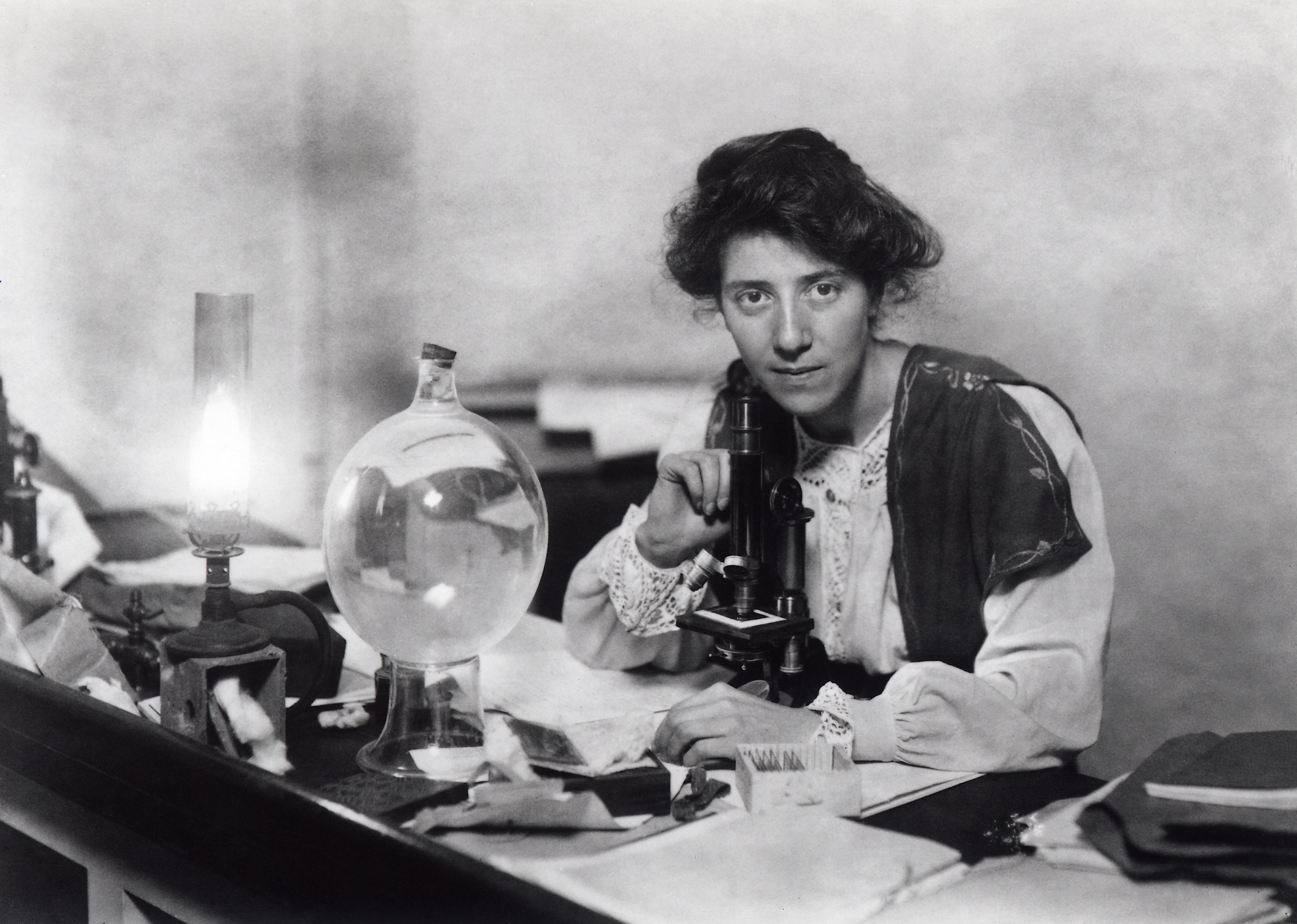
Marie Stopes in her laboratory, 1904

Eugenic feminism was a current of the women's suffrage movement which overlapped with eugenics. Originally coined by the Lebanese-British physician and vocal eugenicist Caleb Saleeby, the term has since been applied to summarize views held by prominent feminists of Great Britain and the United States. Some early suffragettes in Canada, especially a group known as The Famous Five, also pushed for various eugenic policies.

Eugenic feminists argued that if women were provided with more rights and equality, the deteriorating characteristics of a given race could be averted.

=== North American eugenics ===
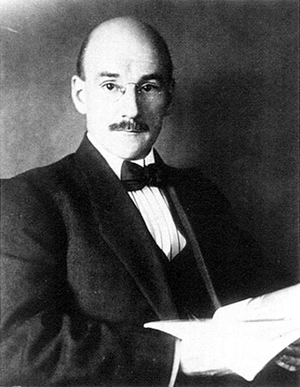
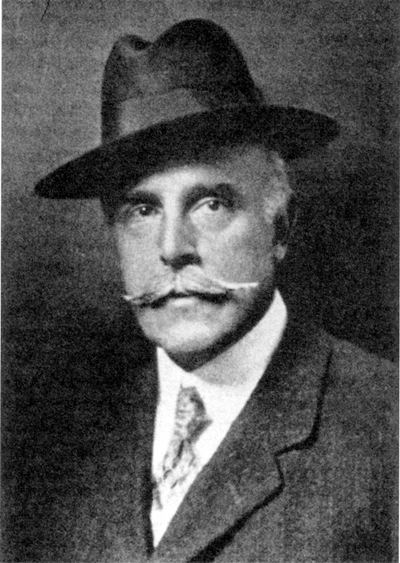
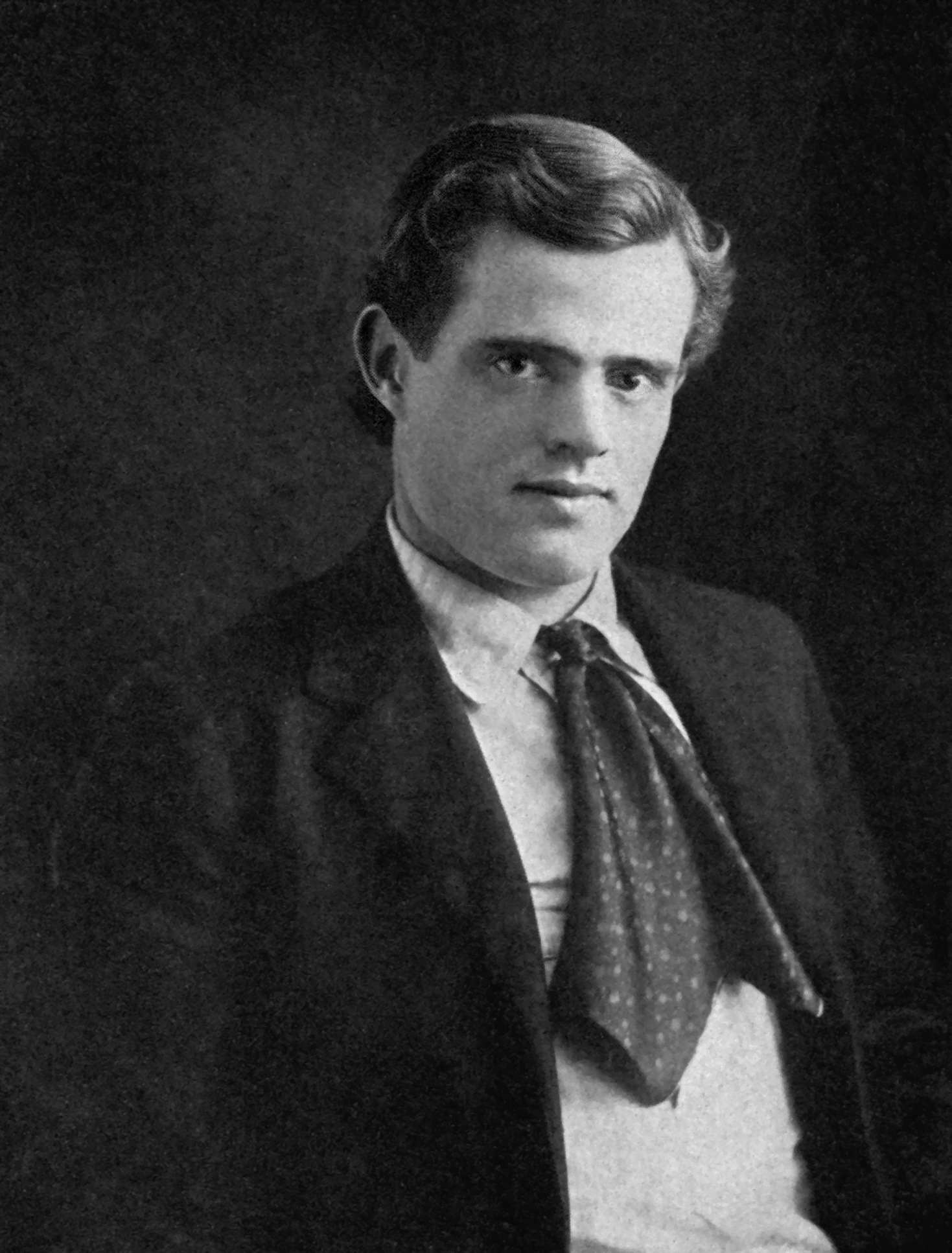
American eugenicists generally pursued more public-facing work and accordingly became widely known for their racism in particular. Along these lines, they were often harshly criticised by their British counterparts.
While its American practice was ostensibly about improving genetic quality, it has been argued that eugenics was more about preserving the position of the dominant groups in the population. Scholarly research has determined that people who found themselves targets of the eugenics movement were those who were seen as unfit for society—the poor, the disabled, the mentally ill, and specific communities of color—and a disproportionate number of those who fell victim to eugenicists' sterilization initiatives were women who were identified as African American, Asian American, or Native American. As a result, the United States' eugenics movement has since been associated with racist and nativist elements, as the movement was to some extent a reaction to demographic and population changes, as well as concerns over the economy and social well-being, rather than scientific genetics.

==== In Mexico ====
Following the Mexican Revolution, the eugenics movement gained prominence in Mexico. Seeking to change the genetic make-up of the country's population, proponents of eugenics in Mexico focused primarily on rebuilding the population, creating healthy citizens, and ameliorating the effects of perceived social ills such as alcoholism, prostitution, and venereal diseases. Mexican eugenics, at its height in the 1930s, influenced the state's health, education, and welfare policies.

Mexican elites adopted eugenic thinking and raised it under the banner of “the Great Mexican family” (Spanish: la gran familia mexicana).

Unlike in other countries, the eugenics movements in Latin America were largely founded on the idea of neo-Lamarckian eugenics. Neo-Lamarckian eugenics stated that the outside effects experienced by an organism, throughout its lifetime, changed its genetics, permanently, allowing the organism to pass acquired traits onto its offspring. In the Neo-Lamarckian genetic framework, activities, such as prostitution and alcoholism, could result in the degeneration of future generations, amplifying fears about the effects of certain social ills. However, the supposed genetic malleability also offered hope, to certain Latin American eugenicists, as social reform would have the ability to transform the population, more permanently.

=== Nazism and the decline of eugenics ===
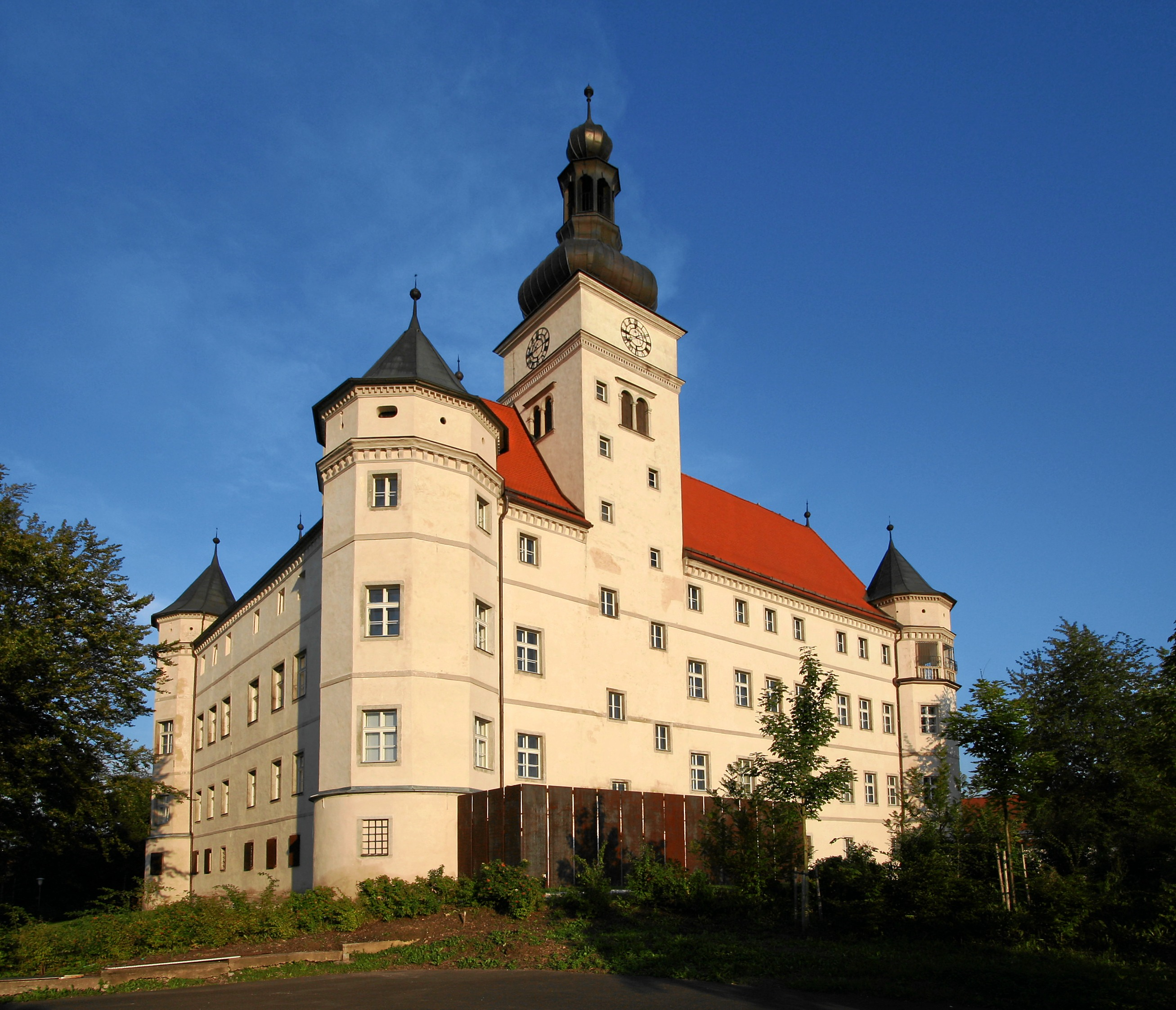
Schloss Hartheim, a former centre for Nazi Germany's Aktion T4 campaign

The reputation of eugenics started to decline in the 1930s, a time when Ernst Rüdin used eugenics as a justification for the racial policies of Nazi Germany. Adolf Hitler had praised and incorporated eugenic ideas in Mein Kampf in 1925 and emulated eugenic legislation for the sterilisation of "defectives" that had been pioneered in the United States once he took power. Some common early 20th century eugenics methods involved identifying and classifying individuals and their families. This included racial groups (such as the Roma and Jews in Nazi Germany), the poor, mentally ill, blind, deaf, developmentally disabled, promiscuous women, and homosexuals as "degenerate" or "unfit". This led to segregation, institutionalisation, sterilisation, and mass murder. The Nazi policy of identifying German citizens deemed unfit and then systematically murdering them with poison gas, referred to as the Aktion T4 campaign, paved the way for the Holocaust.

"All practices aimed at eugenics, any use of the human body or any of its parts for financial gain, and human cloning shall be prohibited."

— Hungarian Constitution

By the end of World War II, many eugenics laws were abandoned, having become associated with Nazi Germany. H. G. Wells, who had called for "the sterilisation of failures" in 1904, stated in his 1940 book The Rights of Man: Or What Are We Fighting For? that among the human rights, which he believed should be available to all people, was "a prohibition on mutilation, sterilisation, torture, and any bodily punishment". After World War II, the practice of "imposing measures intended to prevent births within [a national, ethnical, racial or religious] group" fell within the definition of the new international crime of genocide, set out in the Convention on the Prevention and Punishment of the Crime of Genocide. The Charter of Fundamental Rights of the European Union also proclaims "the prohibition of eugenic practices, in particular those aiming at selection of persons".

=== In Singapore ===
Lee Kuan Yew, the founding father of Singapore, actively promoted eugenics as late as 1983. In 1984, Singapore began providing financial incentives to highly educated women to encourage them to have more children. For this purpose was introduced the "Graduate Mother Scheme" that incentivised graduate women to get married as much as the rest of their populace. The incentives were extremely unpopular and regarded as eugenic, and were seen as discriminatory towards Singapore's non-Chinese ethnic population. In 1985, the incentives were partly abandoned as ineffective, while the government matchmaking agency, the Social Development Network, remained active until 2023.

== Modern eugenics ==
Liberal eugenics, also called new eugenics, aims to make genetic interventions morally acceptable by rejecting coercive state programmes and relying on parental choice. Bioethicist Nicholas Agar, who coined the term, argues that the state should intervene only to forbid interventions that excessively limit a child’s ability to shape their own future. Unlike "authoritarian" or "old" eugenics, liberal eugenics draws on modern scientific knowledge of genomics to enable informed choices aimed at improving well-being. Julien Savulescu further argues that some eugenic practices, like prenatal screening for Down syndrome and disability-selective abortion, are already widely practiced, without being labelled "eugenics", as they are seen as enhancing freedom rather than restricting it. Others such as Lucy Burke argue that much of this is connected to ableist and other devaluing views of people with disabilities.

UC Berkeley sociologist Troy Duster argued that modern genetics is a "back door to eugenics". This view was shared by then-White House Assistant Director for Forensic Sciences, Tania Simoncelli, who stated in a 2003 publication by the Population and Development Programme at Hampshire College that advances in pre-implantation genetic diagnosis (PGD) are moving society to a "new era of eugenics", and that, unlike the Nazi eugenics, modern eugenics is consumer driven and market based, "where children are increasingly regarded as made-to-order consumer products". The United Nations' International Bioethics Committee also noted that while human genetic engineering should not be confused with the 20th century eugenics movements, it nonetheless challenges the idea of human equality and opens up new forms of discrimination and stigmatisation for those who do not want or cannot afford the technology.

In 2025, geneticist Peter Visscher published a paper in Nature, arguing genome editing of human embryos and germ cells may become feasible in the 21st century, and raising ethical considerations in the context of previous eugenics movements. A response argued that human embryo genetic editing is "unsafe and unproven". Nature also published an editorial, stating: "The fear that polygenic gene editing could be used for eugenics looms large among them, and is, in part, why no country currently allows genome editing in a human embryo, even for single variants".

== Contested scientific status ==
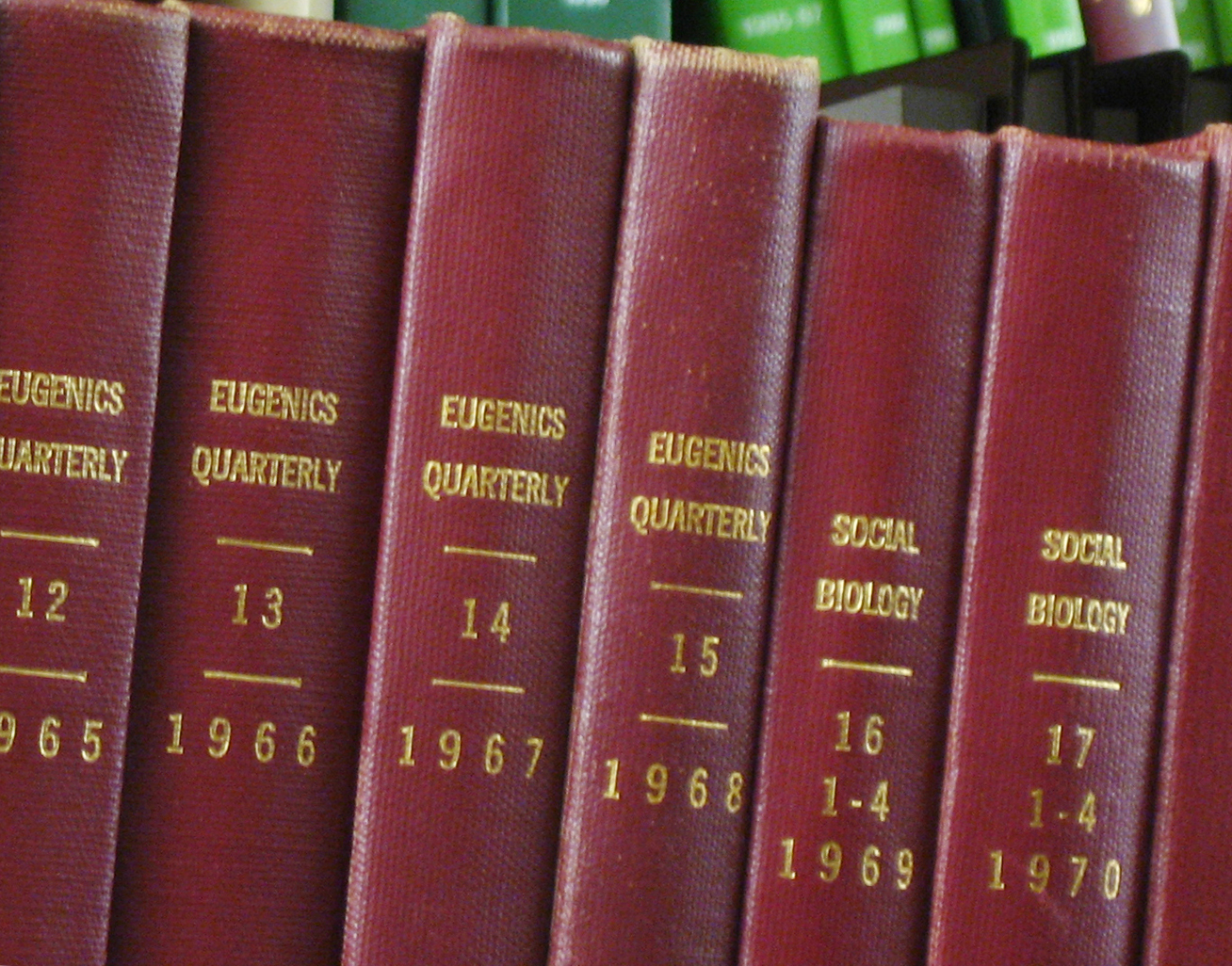
In the decades after World War II, the term "eugenics" had taken on a negative connotation and as a result, the use of it became increasingly unpopular within the scientific community. Many organizations and journals that had their origins in the eugenics movement began to distance themselves from the philosophy which spawned them, as when Eugenics Quarterly was renamed Social Biology in 1969.

One general concern is that the reduced genetic diversity that may be a feature of long-term, species-wide eugenics plans could eventually result in inbreeding depression, increased spread of infectious disease, and decreased resilience to changes in the environment.

=== Arguments for scientific validity ===
In his original lecture "Darwinism, Medical Progress and Eugenics", Karl Pearson claimed that everything concerning eugenics fell into the field of medicine. Anthropologist Aleš Hrdlička said in 1918 that "[t]he growing science of eugenics will essentially become applied anthropology." The economist John Maynard Keynes was a lifelong proponent of eugenics and described it as a branch of sociology.

In a 2006 newspaper article, Richard Dawkins said that discussion regarding eugenics was inhibited by the shadow of Nazi misuse, to the extent that some scientists would not admit that breeding humans for certain abilities is at all possible. He believes that it is not physically different from breeding domestic animals for traits such as speed or herding skill. Dawkins felt that enough time had elapsed to at least ask just what the ethical differences were between breeding for ability versus training athletes or forcing children to take music lessons, though he could think of persuasive reasons to draw the distinction.

=== Objections to scientific validity ===
Amanda Caleb, Professor of Medical Humanities at Geisinger Commonwealth School of Medicine, says "Eugenic laws and policies are now understood as part of a specious devotion to a pseudoscience that actively dehumanises to support political agendas and not true science or medicine."

The first major challenge to conventional eugenics based on genetic inheritance was made in 1915 by Thomas Hunt Morgan. He demonstrated the event of genetic mutation occurring outside of inheritance involving the discovery of the hatching of a fruit fly (Drosophila melanogaster) with white eyes from a family with red eyes, demonstrating that major genetic changes occurred outside of inheritance. Morgan criticised the view that traits such as intelligence or criminality were hereditary, because these traits were subjective. (Note: Despite Morgan's public rejection of eugenics, much of his genetic research was adopted by proponents of eugenics.)

Pleiotropy occurs when one gene influences multiple, seemingly unrelated phenotypic traits, an example being phenylketonuria, which is a human disease that affects multiple systems but is caused by one gene defect. Andrzej Pękalski, from the University of Wroclaw, argues that eugenics can cause harmful loss of genetic diversity if a eugenics programme selects a pleiotropic gene that could possibly be associated with a positive trait. Pękalski uses the example of a coercive government eugenics programme that prohibits people with myopia from breeding but has the unintended consequence of also selecting against high intelligence since the two were associated.

While the science of genetics has increasingly provided means by which certain characteristics and conditions can be identified and understood, given the complexity of human genetics, culture, and psychology, at this point there is no agreed objective means of determining which traits might be ultimately desirable or undesirable. Some conditions such as sickle-cell disease and cystic fibrosis respectively confer immunity to malaria and resistance to cholera when a single copy of the recessive allele is contained within the genotype of the individual, so eliminating these genes is undesirable in places where such diseases are common.

Edwin Black, journalist, historian, and author of War Against the Weak, argues that eugenics is often deemed a pseudoscience because what is defined as a genetic improvement of a desired trait is a cultural choice rather than a matter that can be determined through objective scientific inquiry. This aspect of eugenics is often considered to be tainted with scientific racism and pseudoscience.

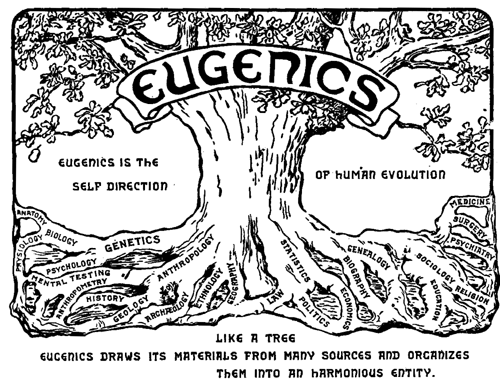
Logo from the Second International Eugenics Conference, 1921. The bottom text reads: "Like A Tree, Eugenics Draws Its Materials From Many Sources And Organises Them Into An Harmonious Entity" (such sources, i.e. roots, purportedly including e.g. genetics, physiology, mental testing, anthropology, statistics, medicine, politics and sociology).

== Contested ethical status ==
=== Contemporary ethical opposition ===
In a book directly addressed at socialist eugenicist J.B.S. Haldane and his once-influential Daedalus, Bertrand Russell had one serious objection of his own: eugenic policies might simply end up being used to reproduce existing power relations "rather than to make men happy".

Environmental ethicist Bill McKibben argued against germinal choice technology and other advanced biotechnological strategies for human enhancement. He writes that it would be morally wrong for humans to tamper with fundamental aspects of themselves (or their children) in an attempt to overcome universal human limitations, such as vulnerability to aging, maximum life span and biological constraints on physical and cognitive ability. Attempts to "improve" themselves through such manipulation would remove limitations that provide a necessary context for the experience of meaningful human choice. He claims that human lives would no longer seem meaningful in a world where such limitations could be overcome with technology. Even the goal of using germinal choice technology for clearly therapeutic purposes should be relinquished, he argues, since it would inevitably produce temptations to tamper with such things as cognitive capacities. He argues that it is possible for societies to benefit from renouncing particular technologies, using Ming China, Tokugawa Japan and the contemporary Amish as examples.

=== Contemporary ethical advocacy ===
Bioethicist Stephen Wilkinson has said that some aspects of modern genetics can be classified as eugenics, but that this classification does not inherently make modern genetics immoral.

Historian Nathaniel C. Comfort has claimed that the change from state-led reproductive-genetic decision-making to individual choice has moderated the worst abuses of eugenics by transferring the decision-making process from the state to patients and their families.

In their book published in 2000, From Chance to Choice: Genetics and Justice, bioethicists Allen Buchanan, Dan Brock, Norman Daniels and Daniel Wikler argued that liberal societies have an obligation to encourage as wide an adoption of eugenic enhancement technologies as possible (so long as such policies do not infringe on individuals' reproductive rights or exert undue pressures on prospective parents to use these technologies) in order to maximise public health and minimise the inequalities that may result from both natural genetic endowments and unequal access to genetic enhancements.

=== Ethical recommendations and regulation of genetic practices ===
In its Opinion No. 138 of 20 May 2021, entitled Eugenics: What Are We Talking About?, the French National Consultative Ethics Committee (CCNE) emphasizes the need for ethical oversight of genetic and reproductive practices. It stresses the importance of distinguishing medical practices aimed at preventing or treating diseases from coercive policies involving the selection of individuals. In light of the development of prenatal diagnosis, preimplantation genetic diagnosis and genomic medicine techniques, the CCNE emphasizes the need to preserve freedom of reproductive choice, prevent social pressures that may influence these choices, and protect people with disabilities from stigmatization. It also calls for caution regarding interventions involving germ cells, as modifications to these cells may be transmitted to future generations. Finally, it highlights the value of human diversity and stresses that scientific progress must not lead to the genetic homogenization of the population. These recommendations aim to promote the responsible use of medical advances while respecting human dignity and the principles of bioethics.

=== Risks and abuses of eugenics ===
Eugenics raises several ethical, social and scientific concerns. It can promote discrimination and the stigmatization of people with disabilities or certain genetic characteristics by reinforcing the idea that some human traits are more desirable than others. Genetic selection practices may also exert social pressure on parents' reproductive choices and contribute to the homogenization of genetic characteristics within the population. Furthermore, the development of sequencing and genome-editing technologies raises questions about the selection of embryos based on non-medical traits and the pursuit of a genetically "perfect" child. Genetic modifications that can be inherited by offspring also entail risks associated with unforeseen effects and potential consequences for future generations. Finally, the complexity of heredity and the interactions between genetic and environmental factors make it difficult to define an ideal genetic makeup and predict the consequences of selecting certain variants.

== In popular culture ==
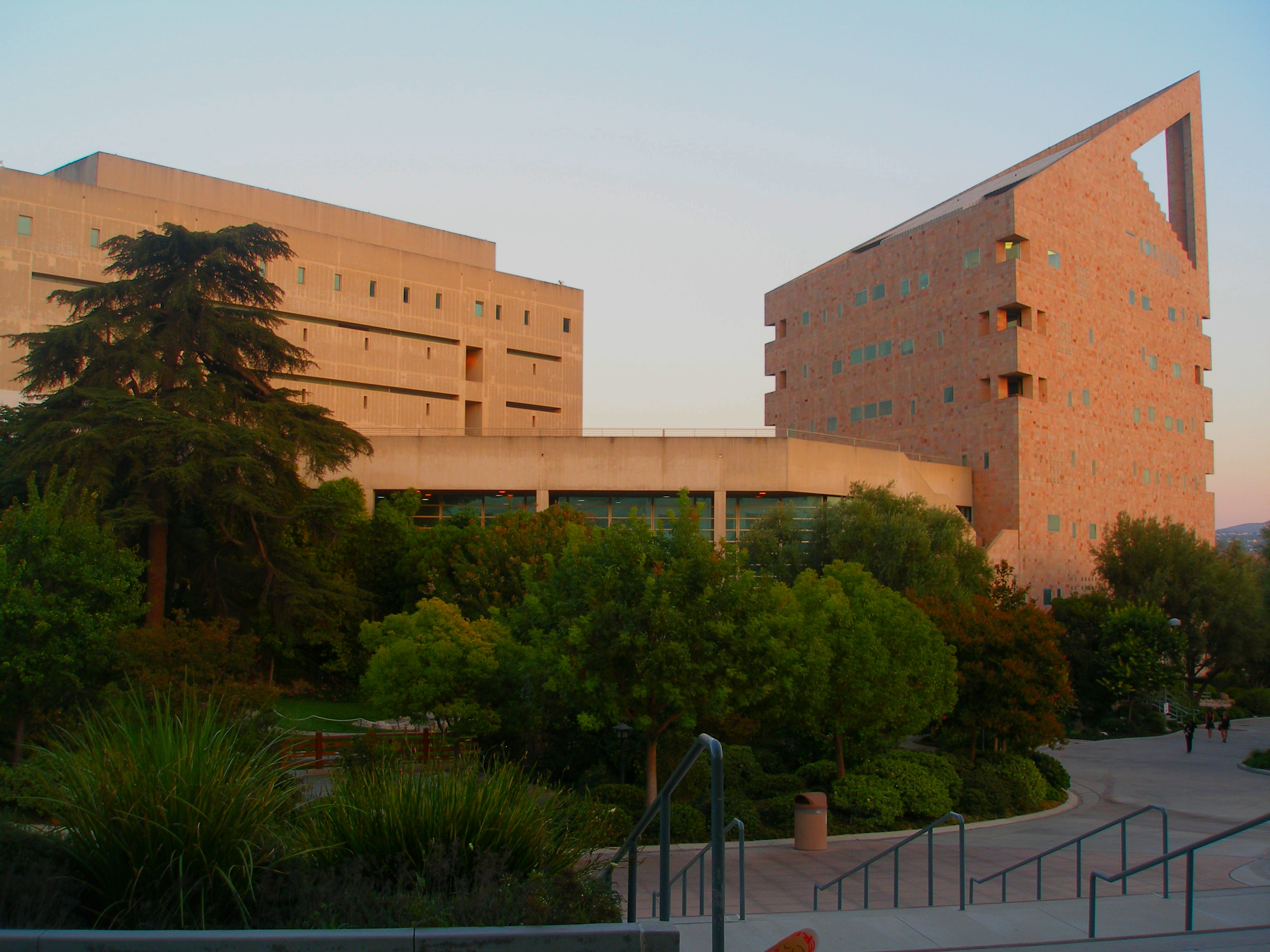
In the film, Gattaca also refers to the futuristic building complex that hosts the astronauts for an ongoing space colonisation programme.

The novel Brave New World (1931) by the English author Aldous Huxley is a dystopian social science fiction novel which is set in a futuristic World State, whose citizens are environmentally engineered into an intelligence-based social hierarchy.

Various works by the author Robert A. Heinlein mention the Howard Foundation, a group which attempts to improve human longevity through selective breeding.

Among Frank Herbert's works, the Dune series, starting with the eponymous 1965 novel, describes selective breeding by a powerful sisterhood, the Bene Gesserit, to produce a supernormal male being, the Kwisatz Haderach.

The Star Trek franchise features a race of genetically engineered humans which is known as "Augments", the most notable of them being Khan Noonien Singh. These "supermen" were the cause of the Eugenics Wars, a dark period in Earth's fictional history, before they were deposed and exiled. (Note: Similarly, the author Edwin Black has described potential "eugenics wars" as the worst-case outcome of eugenics. In his view, this scenario would mean the return of coercive state-sponsored genetic discrimination and human rights violations such as the compulsory sterilisation of persons with genetic defects, the killing of the institutionalised and, specifically, the segregation and genocide of races which are considered inferior. Law professors George Annas and Lori Andrews have similarly argued that the use of these technologies could lead to such human-posthuman caste warfare.) Spin-offs like Star Trek: Deep Space Nine and Star Trek: Strange New Worlds present the Eugenics Wars as the main reason why genetic enhancement is illegal in the United Federation of Planets.

Naoki Urasawa's manga Monster and its anime adaptation of the same name mention "The Eugenics Experiment" conducted in the premises of 511 Kinderheim, a clandestine East German orphanage where the main antagonist Johan Liebert grew up into a psychopathic serial killer.

The film Gattaca (1997) provides a fictional example of a dystopian society that uses eugenics to decide what people are capable of and their place in the world. The title alludes to the letters G, A, T and C, the four nucleobases of DNA, and depicts the possible consequences of genetic discrimination in the present societal framework. Relegated to the role of a cleaner owing to his genetically projected death at age 32 due to a heart condition (being told: "The only way you'll see the inside of a spaceship is if you were cleaning it"), the protagonist observes enhanced astronauts as they are demonstrating their superhuman athleticism. Although it was not a box office success, it was critically acclaimed and influenced the debate over human genetic engineering in the public consciousness. (Note: Gattaca has been cited by many bioethicists and laypeople in support of their hesitancy about, or opposition to, eugenics and the genetic determinist ideology that may frame it. Accordingly, Lee M. Silver stated that "Gattaca is a film that all geneticists should see if for no other reason than to understand the perception of our trade held by so many of the public-at-large".) As to its accuracy, its production company, Sony Pictures, consulted with a gene therapy researcher and prominent critic of eugenics known to have stated that "[w]e should not step over the line that delineates treatment from enhancement", W. French Anderson, to ensure that the portrayal of science was realistic. Disputing their success in this mission, Philim Yam of Scientific American called the film "science bashing" and Nature's Kevin Davies called it a "surprisingly pedestrian affair", while molecular biologist Lee Silver described its extreme determinism as "a straw man".

In his 2018 book Blueprint, the behavioural geneticist Robert Plomin writes that while Gattaca warned of the dangers of genetic information being used by a totalitarian state, genetic testing could also favour better meritocracy in democratic societies which already administer a variety of standardised tests to select people for education and employment. He suggests that polygenic scores might supplement testing in a manner that is essentially free of biases.

== See also ==
- Outline of eugenics
- Ableism
- Bioconservatism
- Culling
- Dor Yeshorim
- Dysgenics
- Eugenic feminism
- Euthenics
- Genetic engineering
- Genetic enhancement
- Hereditarianism
- Heritability of IQ
- Mendelian traits in humans
  - Simple Mendelian genetics in humans
- Moral enhancement
- Master Race
- Natalism
- Project Prevention
- Social Darwinism
- Transhumanism
- Wrongful life
- Eugenics in France
