= Mendelian inheritance =

Type of biological inheritance

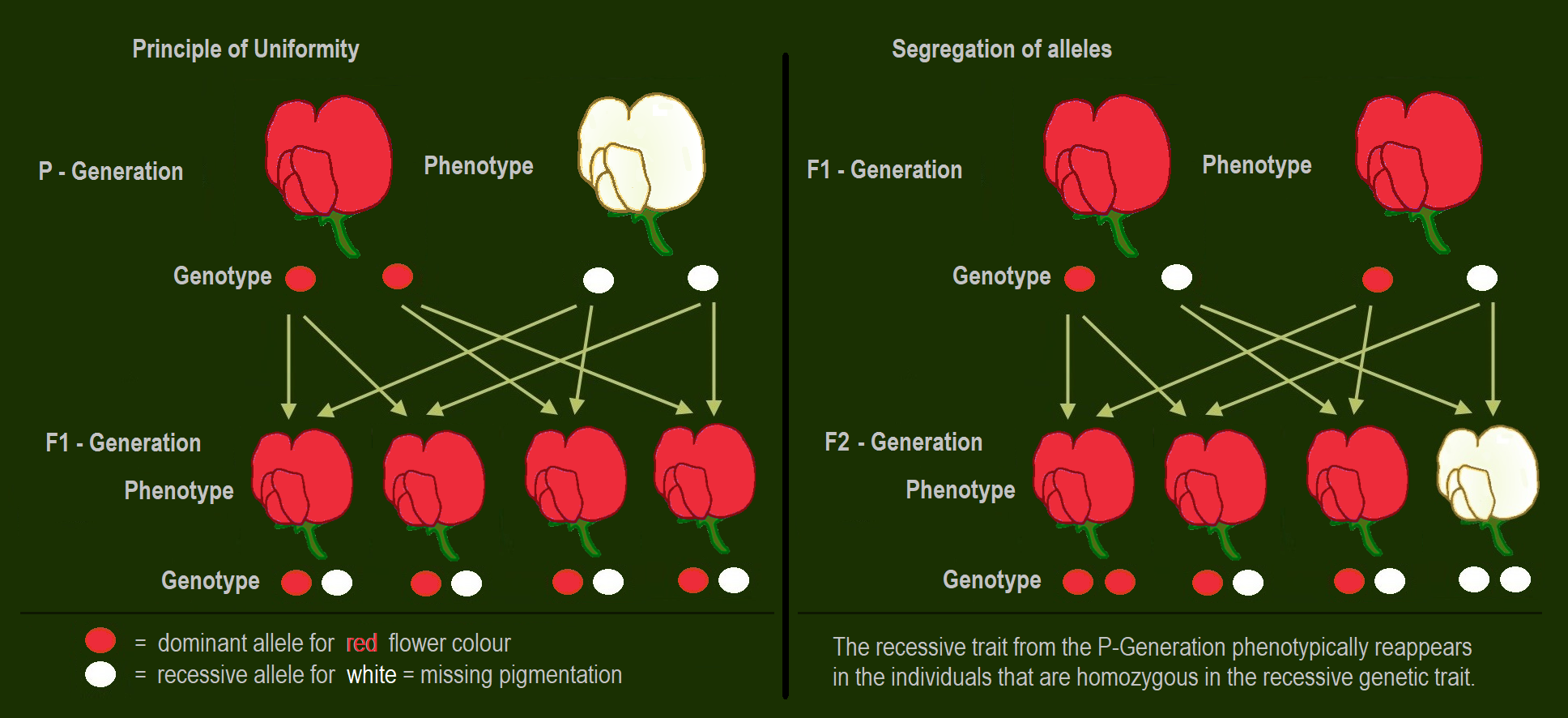
The inheritance patterns following the laws originally described by Gregor Mendel by which genes and traits are passed from parents to their offspring.

Mendelian inheritance (sometimes referred to as Mendelism) is a type of biological inheritance following the principles originally proposed by Gregor Mendel in 1865 and 1866, re-discovered in 1900 by Hugo de Vries and Carl Correns, and later popularized by William Bateson. The defining characteristic of Mendelian inheritance is its heavy association with a singular gene. Mendel's theories on genetics (now considered principles of genetics) were initially controversial. When Mendel's theories were integrated with the Boveri–Sutton chromosome theory of inheritance by Thomas Hunt Morgan in 1915, they became the core of classical genetics. Ronald Fisher combined these ideas with the theory of natural selection in his 1930 book The Genetical Theory of Natural Selection, putting evolution onto a mathematical footing and forming the basis for population genetics within the modern evolutionary synthesis. It should be contrasted with non-Mendelian inheritance, which does not follow the same principles.

== History ==
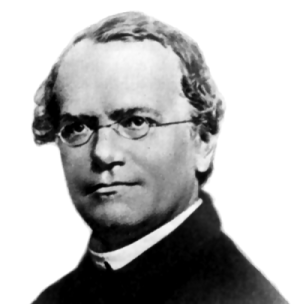
Gregor Mendel, the Moravian Augustinian friar who founded the modern science of genetics

The principles of Mendelian inheritance were named for and first derived by Gregor Johann Mendel, a nineteenth-century Moravian monk who formulated his ideas after conducting simple hybridization experiments with pea plants (Pisum sativum) he had planted in the garden of his monastery. Between 1856 and 1863, Mendel cultivated and tested some 28,000 pea plants. From these experiments, he induced two generalizations which later became known as Mendel's Principles of Heredity or Mendelian inheritance. He described his experiments in a two-part paper, Versuche über Pflanzen-Hybriden (Experiments on Plant Hybridization), that he presented to the Brünn Natural History Society of Brno on 8 February and 8 March 1865, and which was published in 1866.

Mendel's results were at first largely ignored. Although they were not completely unknown to biologists of the time, they were not seen as generally applicable, even by Mendel himself, who thought they only applied to certain categories of species or traits. A major roadblock to understanding their significance was the importance attached by 19th-century biologists to the apparent blending of many inherited traits in the overall appearance of the progeny — now known to be due to multi-gene interactions, in contrast to the organ-specific binary characters studied by Mendel.

Mendel's work was "re-discovered" in 1900 by three European scientists, Carl Correns, Erich von Tschermak, and Hugo de Vries. The exact order and nature of their "re-discovery" has been debated; De Vries published first on the subject, mentioning Mendel in a footnote, while Correns pointed out Mendel's priority after having read De Vries' paper and realizing that he himself did not have priority. De Vries may not have acknowledged truthfully how much of his knowledge of the laws came from his own work and how much came only after reading Mendel's paper. Later scholars have accused Von Tschermak of not truly understanding the results at all.

Regardless of the backstory, this "re-discovery" made Mendel's work an important but controversial theory. Its most vigorous promoter in Europe was William Bateson, who coined the terms "genetics" and "allele" to describe many of its tenets. The model of heredity was contested by other biologists because it implied that heredity was discontinuous, in opposition to the apparently continuous variation observable for many traits. Many biologists also dismissed the theory because they were not sure it would apply to all species. However, later work by biologists and statisticians (including research done by Ronald Aymel Fisher, such as his The Correlation between Relatives on the Supposition of Mendelian Inheritance) showed that if multiple Mendelian factors were involved in the expression of an individual trait, they could produce the diverse results observed, thus demonstrating that Mendelian genetics is compatible with natural selection. This would go on to influence Sewall Wright's work in 1931.

Thomas Hunt Morgan and his assistants later integrated Mendel's theoretical model with the chromosome theory of inheritance, in which the chromosomes of cells were thought to hold the actual hereditary material, and created what is now known as classical genetics, a highly successful foundation which eventually cemented Mendel's place in history. T.H. Morgan was also creditable for his research on genetic mutation.

Mendel's findings allowed scientists such as R.A. Fisher and J.B.S. Haldane to predict the expression of traits on the basis of mathematical probabilities.

An important aspect of Mendel's success can be traced to his decision to start his research only with plants he demonstrated were true-breeding. He only measured discrete (binary) characteristics, such as color, shape, and position of the seeds, rather than quantitatively variable characteristics. He expressed his results numerically and subjected them to statistical analysis. His method of data analysis and his large sample size gave credibility to his data. He had the foresight to follow several successive generations (P, F_{1}, F_{2}, F_{3}) of pea plants and record their variations. Finally, he performed "test crosses" (backcrossing descendants of the initial hybridization to the initial true-breeding lines) to reveal the presence and proportions of recessive characters.

== Inheritance tools ==
=== Punnett squares ===
Punnett squares are a well known genetics tool that was created by an English geneticist, Reginald Punnett, which can visually demonstrate all the possible genotypes that an offspring can receive, given the genotypes of their parents. Each parent carries two alleles, which can be shown on the top and the side of the chart, and each contribute one of them towards reproduction at a time. Each of the squares in the middle demonstrates the number of times each pairing of parental alleles could combine to make potential offspring. Using probabilities, one can then determine which genotypes the parents can create, and at what frequencies they can be created.

For example, if two parents both have a heterozygous genotype, then there would be a 50% chance for their offspring to have the same genotype, and a 50% chance they would have a homozygous genotype. Since they could possibly contribute two identical alleles, the 50% would be halved to 25% to account for each type of homozygote, whether this was a homozygous dominant genotype, or a homozygous recessive genotype.

=== Pedigrees ===
Pedigrees are visual tree like representations that demonstrate exactly how alleles are being passed from past generations to future ones. They also provide a diagram displaying each individual that carries a desired allele, and exactly which side of inheritance it was received from, whether it was from their mother's side or their father's side. Pedigrees can also be used to aid researchers in determining the inheritance pattern for the desired allele, because they share information such as the gender of all individuals, the phenotype, a predicted genotype, the potential sources for the alleles, and also based its history, how it could continue to spread in the future generations to come. By using pedigrees, scientists have been able to find ways to control the flow of alleles over time, so that alleles that act problematic can be resolved upon discovery.

== Mendel's genetic discoveries ==
Five parts of Mendel's discoveries were an important divergence from the common theories at the time and were the prerequisite for the establishment of his rules.

1. Characters are unitary, that is, they are discrete e.g.: purple vs. white, tall vs. dwarf. There is no medium-sized plant or light purple flower.
2. Genetic characteristics have alternate forms, each inherited from one of two parents. Today these are called alleles.
3. One allele is dominant over the other. The phenotype reflects the dominant allele.
4. Gametes are created by random segregation. Heterozygotic individuals produce gametes with an equal frequency of the two alleles.
5. Different traits have independent assortment. In modern terms, genes are unlinked.

According to customary terminology, the principles of inheritance discovered by Gregor Mendel are here referred to as Mendelian laws, although today's geneticists also speak of Mendelian rules or Mendelian principles, as there are many exceptions summarized under the collective term Non-Mendelian inheritance. The laws were initially formulated by the geneticist Thomas Hunt Morgan in 1916.

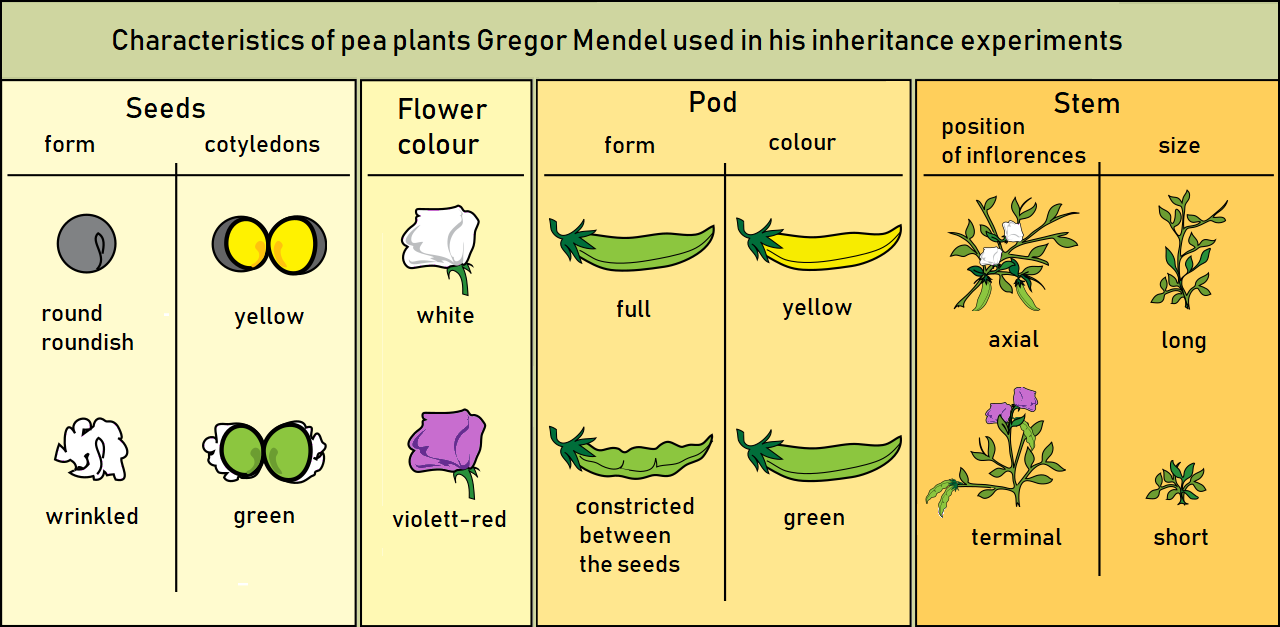
Characteristics Mendel used in his experiments

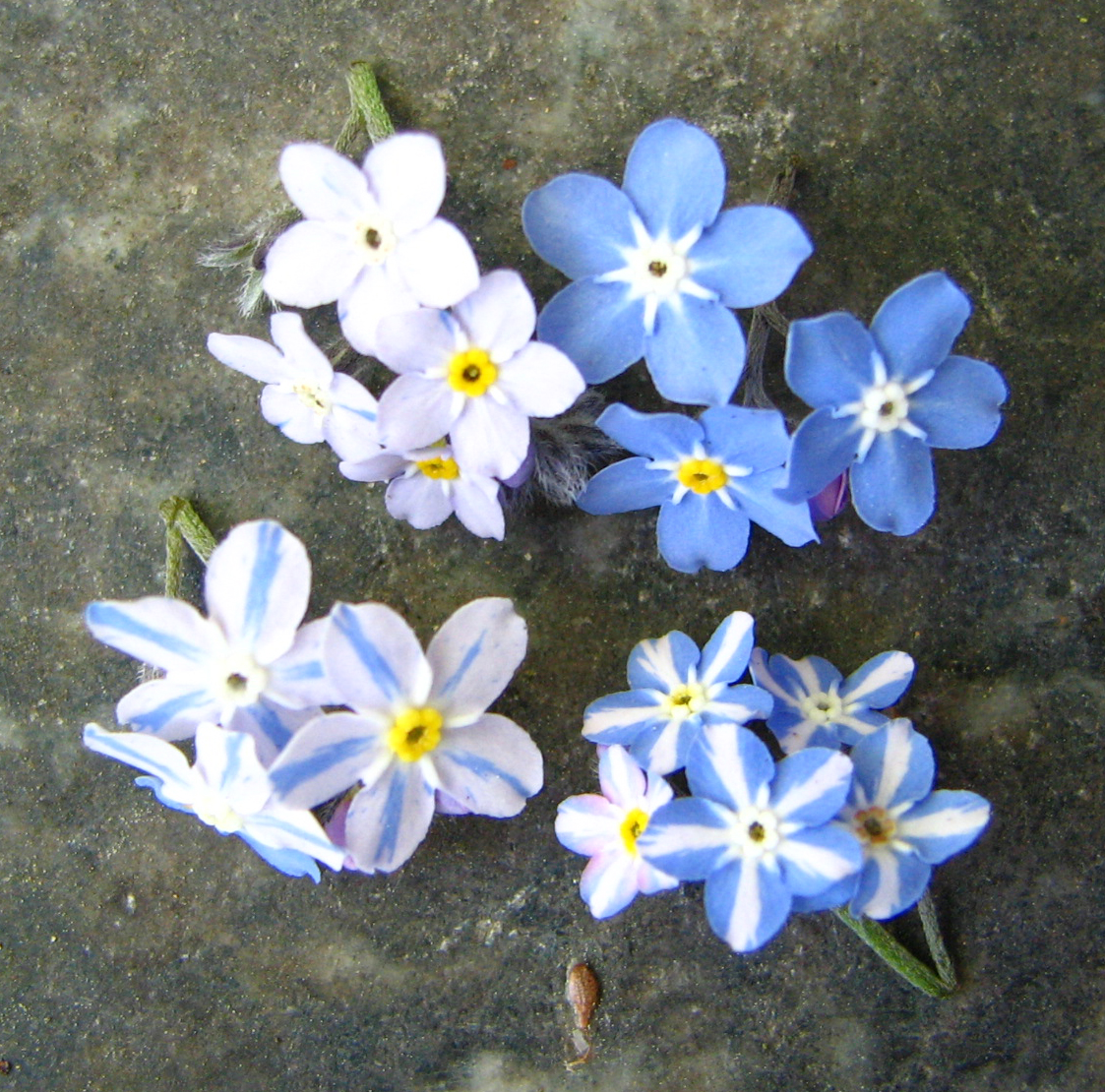
Myosotis: Colour and distribution of colours are inherited independently.

Mendel selected for the experiment the following characters of pea plants:

- Form of the ripe seeds (round or roundish, surface shallow or wrinkled)
- Colour of the seed–coat (white, gray, or brown, with or without violet spotting)
- Colour of the seeds and cotyledons (yellow or green)
- Flower colour (white or violet-red)
- Form of the ripe pods (simply inflated, not contracted, or constricted between the seeds and wrinkled)
- Colour of the unripe pods (yellow or green)
- Position of the flowers (axial or terminal)
- Length of the stem

When he crossed purebred white flower and purple flower pea plants (the parental or P generation) by artificial pollination, the resulting flower colour was not a blend. Rather than being a mix of the two, the offspring in the first generation (F_{1}-generation) were all purple-flowered. Therefore, he called this biological trait dominant. When he allowed self-fertilization in the uniform looking F_{1}-generation, he obtained both colours in the F_{2} generation with a purple flower to white flower ratio of 3 : 1. In some of the other characters also one of the traits was dominant.

He then conceived the idea of heredity units, which he called "factors". Mendel found that there are alternative forms of factors—now called genes—that account for variations in inherited characteristics. For example, the gene for flower color in pea plants exists in two forms, one for purple and the other for white. The alternative "forms" are now called alleles. For each trait, an organism inherits two alleles, one from each parent. These alleles may be the same or different. An organism that has two identical alleles for a gene is said to be homozygous for that gene (and is called a homozygote). An organism that has two different alleles for a gene is said to be heterozygous for that gene (and is called a heterozygote).

Mendel hypothesized that allele pairs separate randomly, or segregate, from each other during the production of the gametes in the seed plant (egg cell) and the pollen plant (sperm). Because allele pairs separate during gamete production, a sperm or egg carries only one allele for each inherited trait. When sperm and egg unite at fertilization, each contributes its allele, restoring the paired condition in the offspring. Mendel also found that each pair of alleles segregates independently of the other pairs of alleles during gamete formation.

The genotype of an individual is made up of the many alleles it possesses. The phenotype is the result of the expression of all characteristics that are genetically determined by its alleles as well as by its environment. The presence of an allele does not mean that the trait will be expressed in the individual that possesses it. If the two alleles of an inherited pair differ (the heterozygous condition), then one determines the organism's appearance and is called the dominant allele; the other has no noticeable effect on the organism's appearance and is called the recessive allele.

== Mendel's laws of inheritance ==
Mendel's laws of inheritance
Law	Definition
Law of dominance and uniformity	Some alleles are dominant while others are recessive; an organism with at least one dominant allele will display the effect of the dominant allele.
Law of segregation	During gamete formation, the alleles for each gene segregate from each other so that each gamete carries only one allele for each gene.
Law of independent assortment	Genes of different traits can segregate independently during the formation of gametes.

=== Law of dominance and uniformity ===
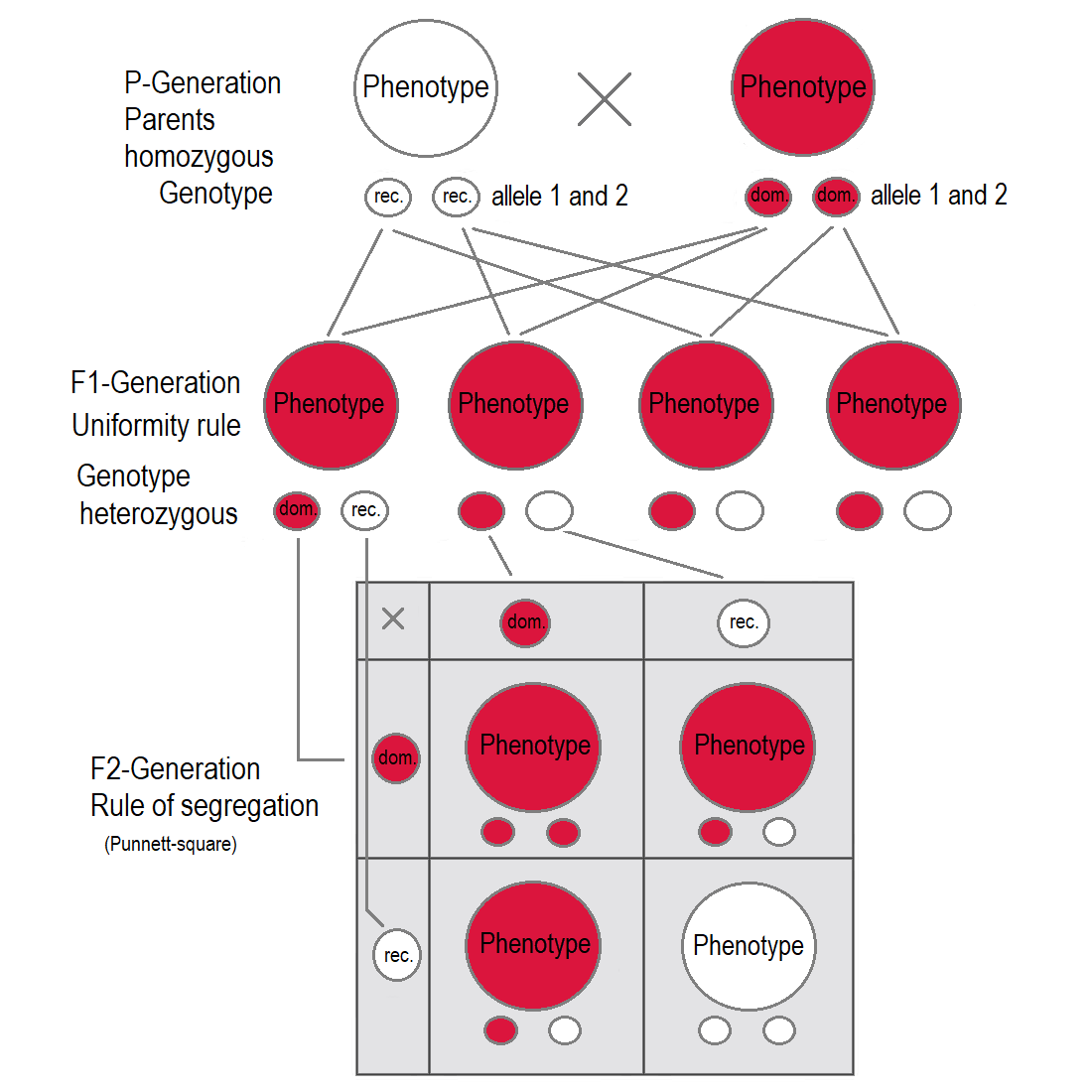
F_{1} generation: All individuals have the same genotype and same phenotype expressing the dominant trait (red). F_{2} generation: The phenotypes in the second generation show a 3 : 1 ratio. In the genotype 25 % are homozygous with the dominant trait, 50 % are heterozygous genetic carriers of the recessive trait, 25 % are homozygous with the recessive genetic trait and expressing the recessive character.

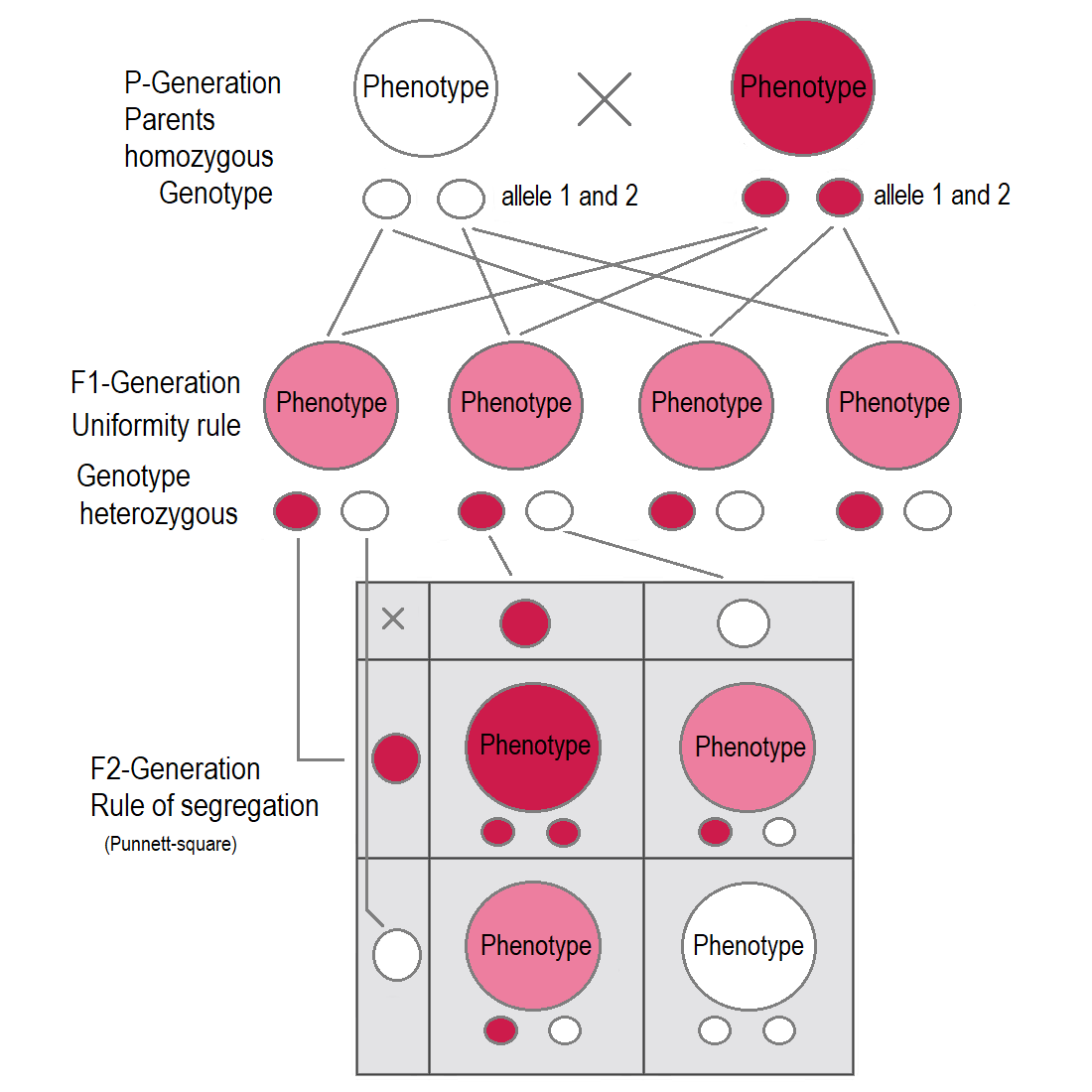
In Mirabilis jalapa and Antirrhinum majus are examples for intermediate inheritance. As seen in the F_{1}-generation, heterozygous plants have "light pink" flowers—a mix of "red" and "white". The F_{2}-generation shows a 1:2:1 ratio of red: light pink: white.

If two parents are mated with each other who differ in one genetic characteristic for which they are both homozygous (each pure-bred), all offspring in the first generation (F_{1}) are equal to the examined characteristic in genotype and phenotype showing the dominant trait. This uniformity rule or reciprocity rule applies to all individuals of the F_{1}-generation.

The principle of dominant inheritance discovered by Mendel states that in a heterozygote the dominant allele will cause the recessive allele to be "masked": that is, not expressed in the phenotype. Only if an individual is homozygous with respect to the recessive allele will the recessive trait be expressed. Therefore, a cross between a homozygous dominant and a homozygous recessive organism yields a heterozygous organism whose phenotype displays only the dominant trait.

The F_{1} offspring of Mendel's pea crosses always looked like one of the two parental varieties. In this situation of "complete dominance", the dominant allele had the same phenotypic effect whether present in one or two copies.

But for some characteristics, the F_{1} hybrids have an appearance in between the phenotypes of the two parental varieties. A cross between two four o'clock (Mirabilis jalapa) plants shows an exception to Mendel's principle, called incomplete dominance. Flowers of heterozygous plants have a phenotype somewhere between the two homozygous genotypes. In cases of intermediate inheritance (incomplete dominance) in the F_{1}-generation Mendel's principle of uniformity in genotype and phenotype applies as well. Research about intermediate inheritance was done by other scientists. The first was Carl Correns with his studies about Mirabilis jalapa.

=== Law of segregation of genes ===
A Punnett square for one of Mendel's pea plant experiments – self-fertilization of the F1 generation

The law of segregation of genes applies when two individuals, both heterozygous for a certain trait, are crossed: for example, hybrids of the F_{1}-generation. The offspring in the F_{2}-generation differ in genotype and phenotype so that the characteristics of the grandparents (P-generation) regularly occur again. In a dominant-recessive inheritance, an average of 25% are homozygous with the dominant trait, 50% are heterozygous showing the dominant trait in the phenotype (genetic carriers), 25% are homozygous with the recessive trait and therefore express the recessive trait in the phenotype. The genotypic ratio is 1: 2 : 1, and the phenotypic ratio is 3: 1.

In the pea plant example, the capital "B" represents the dominant allele for purple blossom and lowercase "b" represents the recessive allele for white blossom. The pistil plant and the pollen plant are both F_{1}-hybrids with genotype "B b". Each has one allele for purple and one allele for white. In the offspring, in the F_{2}-plants in the Punnett-square, three combinations are possible. The genotypic ratio is 1 BB : 2 Bb : 1 bb. But the phenotypic ratio of plants with purple blossoms to those with white blossoms is 3 : 1 due to the dominance of the allele for purple. Plants with homozygous "b b" are white flowered like one of the grandparents in the P-generation.

In cases of incomplete dominance the same segregation of alleles takes place in the F_{2}-generation, but here also the phenotypes show a ratio of 1 : 2 : 1, as the heterozygous are different in phenotype from the homozygous because the genetic expression of one allele compensates the missing expression of the other allele only partially. This results in an intermediate inheritance which was later described by other scientists.

In some literature sources, the principle of segregation is cited as the "first law". Nevertheless, Mendel did his crossing experiments with heterozygous plants after obtaining these hybrids by crossing two purebred plants, discovering the principle of dominance and uniformity first.

Molecular proof of segregation of genes was subsequently found through observation of meiosis by two scientists independently, the German botanist Oscar Hertwig in 1876, and the Belgian zoologist Edouard Van Beneden in 1883. Most alleles are located in chromosomes in the cell nucleus. Paternal and maternal chromosomes get separated in meiosis because during spermatogenesis the chromosomes are segregated on the four sperm cells that arise from one mother sperm cell, and during oogenesis the chromosomes are distributed between the polar bodies and the egg cell. Every individual organism contains two alleles for each trait. They segregate (separate) during meiosis such that each gamete contains only one of the alleles. When the gametes unite in the zygote the alleles—one from the mother one from the father—get passed on to the offspring. An offspring thus receives a pair of alleles for a trait by inheriting homologous chromosomes from the parent organisms: one allele for each trait from each parent. Heterozygous individuals with the dominant trait in the phenotype are genetic carriers of the recessive trait.

=== Law of independent assortment ===
Segregation and independent assortment are consistent with the chromosome theory of inheritance.

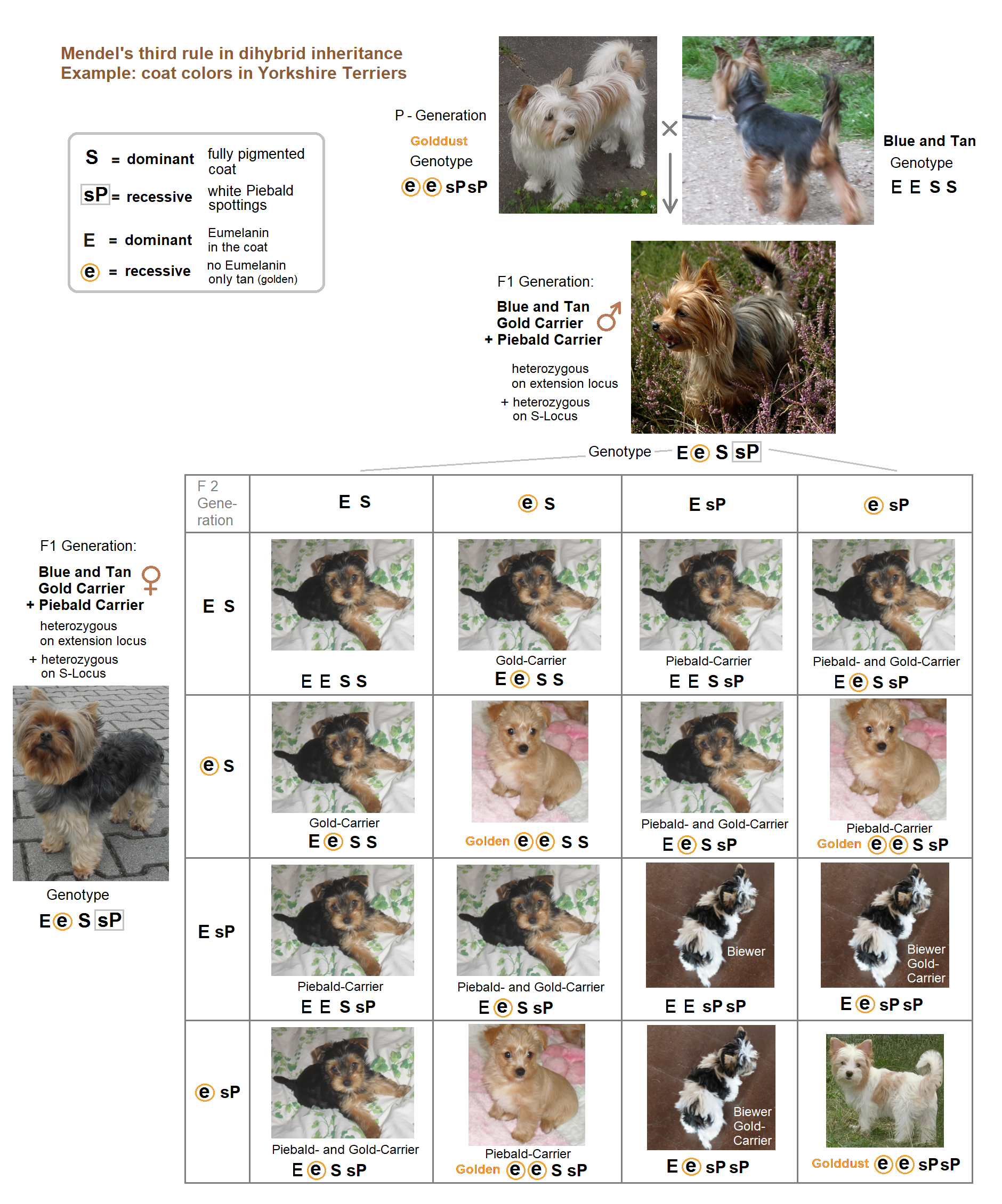
Precondition for the example: Two parent dogs (P-generation) are homozygous for two different genetic traits. In each case one parent has the dominant, one the recessive allele. Their offsprings in the F_{1}-generation are heterozygous at both loci and show the dominant traits in their phenotypes according to the law of dominance and uniformity. Now two heterozygous mature individuals of such F_{1}-generation are bred together. The dominant allele "E" (on the extension locus) provides black eumelanin in the coat. The recessive allele "e" (on the extension locus) hinders the storage of eumelanin in the coat, so only the pigments for the "Tan" colour are in the coat. The dominant allele S (on the S-locus) provides for the pigmentation of the entire coat. The recessive allele sP (on the S-locus) causes a white Piebald spotting. Now in the puppies in the F_{2}-generation all combinations are possible. The Piebald spotting and the genes for the different colour pigments are inherited independently of each other. Average number ratio of phenotypes 9:3:3:1.

For example 3 pairs of homologous chromosomes allow 8 possible combinations, all equally likely to move into the gamete during meiosis. This is the main reason for independent assortment. The equation to determine the number of possible combinations given the number of homologous pairs = 2^{x} (x = number of homologous pairs)

The law of independent assortment proposes alleles for separate traits are passed independently of one another. That is, the biological selection of an allele for one trait has nothing to do with the selection of an allele for any other trait. Mendel found support for this law in his dihybrid cross experiments. In his monohybrid crosses, an idealized 3:1 ratio between dominant and recessive phenotypes resulted. In dihybrid crosses, however, he found a 9:3:3:1 ratios. This shows that each of the two alleles is inherited independently from the other, with a 3:1 phenotypic ratio for each.

Independent assortment occurs in eukaryotic organisms during meiotic metaphase I, and produces a gamete with a mixture of the organism's chromosomes. The physical basis of the independent assortment of chromosomes is the random orientation of each bivalent chromosome along the metaphase plate with respect to the other bivalent chromosomes. Along with crossing over, independent assortment increases genetic diversity by producing novel genetic combinations.

There are many deviations from the principle of independent assortment due to genetic linkage.

Of the 46 chromosomes in a normal diploid human cell, half are maternally derived (from the mother's egg) and half are paternally derived (from the father's sperm). This occurs as sexual reproduction involves the fusion of two haploid gametes (the egg and sperm) to produce a zygote and a new organism, in which every cell has two sets of chromosomes (diploid). During gametogenesis the normal complement of 46 chromosomes needs to be halved to 23 to ensure that the resulting haploid gamete can join with another haploid gamete to produce a diploid organism.

In independent assortment, the chromosomes that result are randomly sorted from all possible maternal and paternal chromosomes. Because zygotes end up with a mix instead of a pre-defined "set" from either parent, chromosomes are therefore considered assorted independently. As such, the zygote can end up with any combination of paternal or maternal chromosomes. For human gametes, with 23 chromosomes, the number of possibilities is 2^{23} or 8,388,608 possible combinations. This contributes to the genetic variability of progeny. Generally, the recombination of genes has important implications for many evolutionary processes.

== Mendelian trait ==
A Mendelian trait is one whose inheritance follows Mendel's principles—namely, the trait depends only on a single locus, whose alleles are either dominant or recessive.

Many traits are inherited in a non-Mendelian fashion.

== Non-Mendelian inheritance ==
Mendel himself warned that care was needed in extrapolating his patterns to other organisms or traits. Indeed, many organisms have traits whose inheritance works differently from the principles he described; these traits are called non-Mendelian.

For example, Mendel focused on traits whose genes have only two alleles, such as "A" and "a". However, many genes have more than two alleles. He also focused on traits determined by a single gene. But some traits, such as height, depend on many genes rather than just one. Traits dependent on multiple genes are called polygenic traits.

== See also ==
- List of Mendelian traits in humans
- Simple Mendelian genetics in humans
- Mendelian diseases (monogenic disease)
- Mendelian error
- Particulate inheritance
- Punnett square
- Non-Mendelian inheritance
- Online Mendelian Inheritance in Man
- Online Mendelian Inheritance in Animals
