= Phenomics =

Systematic study of phenotypes

Phenomics is the study of phenotypic dynamics defining phenotype from the quantum to the ecosystem scales and its emergence as a discipline is attributed to the plant sciences. Phenomics uses phenotyping methods to systematically measure phenotypic traits that characterize an organism. Traits can vary their state over space and time, due to development, aging, metamorphosis or interactions with the environment. As such, phenomics investigates the dynamics generated by phenes constituting the phenome to form measurable phenotypes and their variation across all spatio-temporal scales in living systems, including plants, microbes, animals, and humans.

The definition of the phenome has evolved over the last few decades. Its first definition dates to 1949 as "... the sum total of extragenic, non-autoreproductive portions of the cell, whether cytoplasmic or nuclear. The phenome would be the material basis of the phenotype, just as the genome is the material basis of the genotype". Subsequently, the phenome was associated with an infinite set of traits that cannot be fully determined and was attributed to the evolutionary biologist Michel Soule. Later definitions, however, contradicted this initial notion of the phenome in which phenes are the fundamental building blocks of the phenotype, which implied a finite space. A recent definition unified both concepts by defining the phenome as a set phenes that denote an infinite set of transformations of unit traits that describe the dynamics forming a phenotype with respect to environmental interactions and any chosen set of trait measurements.

All phenome definitions enable researchers to better understand concepts like pleiotropy and phenotypic plasticity. Yet, the major technical challenges involve improving, both qualitatively and quantitatively, the capacity to measure phenomes and relate these measurements to biological and environmental processes.

Phenomics is also a transdisciplinary scientific discipline that unites elements from the life, formal, and physical sciences. The phenotyping process involves the formulation of formal systems with their mathematical foundation to analyze and model phenotyping data that reflects the underlying biological multi-scale dynamics forming a phenotype. An essential aspect of this process is the quantitative and qualitative parametrization of phenes to capture phenotypic variation. However, as of September 2026, there is no undergraduate or graduate program to study phenomics specifically, yet its profession, the phenomicist, has been defined in basic and applied contexts.

== Applications ==
=== Plant sciences ===
In plant sciences, phenomics research occurs in both field and controlled environments. Field phenomics encompasses the measurement of phenotypes that occur in both cultivated and natural conditions, whereas controlled environment phenomics research involves the use of greenhouses, growth chambers, and other systems where growth conditions can be manipulated. The International Plant Phenotyping Network maintains a publicly available database of facilities supporting field and controlled environment phenomics research globally. and can be exlored via an interactive online map.

=== Animal science ===
In animal science, phenomics research occurs mostly in field and farm environments. Specifically, the application of wearable sensors and computer vision allows to identify and breed behavioral, physiological and genetic traits in animals such as poultry, cattle and pigs.

=== Human science ===
Human phenomics is an active research area in human health and the development of diagnostic tools and therapeutics and in evolutionary studies of the human origin.

=== Microbial phenomics ===
Microbial phenomics aims to link microbial phenotype to function in contexts of human, animal and plant health.

== Professional societies and associations ==
=== Plant phenomics ===
The International Plant Phenotyping Network (IPPN) is an organization that seeks to enable exchange of knowledge, information, and expertise across many disciplines involved in plant phenomics by providing a network linking members, platform operators, users, research groups, developers, and policy makers. Regional networks include, the European Plant Phenotyping Network (EPPN), the North American Plant Phenotyping Network (NAPPN), German Plant Phenotyping Network (DPPN), Japan Plant Phenotyping Network (JPPN), Australian Plant Phenomics Network (APPN), Nordic Plant Phenotyping Network (NPPN) and the Latin American Plant Phenomics Network (LatPPN). Without current online presence, the China Plant Phenomics Network (CPPN), Pan Asia Pacific Phenomics Network (PAPPN) were founded.

=== Animal phenomics ===
The European Network on Livestock Phenomics coordinates the European livestock phenomics community.

=== Human and microbial phenomics ===
Currently no specific human, microbial or general phenomics societies are known.

== Standards ==
The Plant Phenomics community developed MIAPPE (Minimum Information About Plant Phenotyping Experiments) as a standard to obtain consistent metadata across experiments, facilitating subsequent meta-analysis. Additionally, ontologies were created to encompass the intricacies of spatial and temporal scales.

The AgBioData Consortium, representing a group of agricultural genetic and genomic databases, has working groups and publications relevant to phenomics data management and federation. BrAPI (Breeding API), a standardized RESTful web service API specification for communicating plant breeding data, serves as a software interface for interoperating genotyping and phenotyping data standards. Projects like OpenALEA enable interoperability between various phenotyping and modeling software.

The cyberinfrastructure CyVerse, the successor of iPlant, empowers researchers to collaborate on their data and software, and drives the development of governance and practices for phenotyping data. These standards efficiently organize plant traits extracted using software libraries and platforms, ranging from end-user-friendly cyber-platforms in the cloud such as DIRT and PlantIt to programming frameworks for software developers like PlantCV.

== Research coordination and communities ==
The International Plant Phenotyping Network (IPPN) is an organization that seeks to enable exchange of knowledge, information, and expertise across many disciplines involved in plant phenomics by providing a network linking members, platform operators, users, research groups, developers, and policy makers. Regional partners include, the European Plant Phenotyping Network (EPPN), the North American Plant Phenotyping Network (NAPPN), and others.

The European research infrastructure for plant phenotyping, EMPHASIS, enables researchers to use facilities, services and resources for multi-scale plant phenotyping across Europe. EMPHASIS aims to promote future food security and agricultural business in a changing climate by enabling scientists to better understand plant performance and translate this knowledge into application.

== Databases ==
=== General phenomics ===
1. PhenomicDB, a database combining phenotypic and genetic data from several species

=== Plant phenomics ===
1. The Quantitative Plant, a comprehensive data base of plant phenotyping tools

=== Animal phenomics ===
1. PhenomeAI, a platform aimed at advancing the of study the phenome with AI tools

=== Human phenomics ===
1. Human Phenotype Ontology, a formal ontology of human phenotypes
2. Centralized Interactive Phenomics Resource, a knowledgebase of computable electronic health records (EHR)-based phenotypes developed by the U.S. Department of Veterans Affairs (VA)
3. PhenoBank, a data sharing and collaborative research platform for human phenome data
4. Phenomics Australia, a research infrastructure provider enabling research discovery and high-impact healthcare outcomes in precision medicine
5. UK National Phenomics Resource, tools to help analyze Electronic Health Records
6. The Human Phenotype Project, collects and shares human deep phenotype multiomic datasets

=== Microbial phenomics ===
1. PROPHECY, a database of high resolution phenomics of microbes

== Journals ==
=== General ===
1. Phenomics

=== Plant ===
1. Plant Phenomics
2. The Plant Phenome Journal

=== Animal and human ===
Currently no specific animal or human phenomics journals are known.

== See also ==
- Phene
- Phenotype
- Phenotypic trait
- Phenotypic plasticity
