= Economic discrimination =

Discrimination based on economic factors

Economic discrimination is discrimination based on economic factors. These factors can include job availability, wages, the prices and/or availability of goods and services, and the amount of capital investment funding available to minorities for business. This can include discrimination against workers, consumers, and minority-owned businesses.

It is not the same as price discrimination, the practice by which monopolists (and to a lesser extent oligopolists and monopolistic competitors) charge different buyers different prices based on their willingness to pay.

== History ==
A recognition of economic discrimination began in the British Railways Clauses Consolidation Act 1845, which prohibited a common carrier from charging one person more for carrying freight than was charged to another customer for the same service. In nineteenth-century English and American common law, discrimination was characterized as improper distinctions in economic transactions; in addition to the above issue in the Railways Clauses Consolidation Act 1845, a hotelier capriciously refusing to give rooms to a particular patron would constitute economic discrimination. These early laws were designed to protect against discrimination from Protestants who might discriminate against Catholics, or Christians who might discriminate against Jews.

By the early twentieth century, economic discrimination was broadened to include biased or unequal terms against other companies or competing companies. In the United States the Robinson-Patman Act (1936), which prevents sellers of commodities in interstate commerce from discriminating in price between purchasers of goods of like grade and quality, was designed to prevent vertically integrated trusts from driving smaller competitors out of the market through economies of scale.

It was not until 1941, when U.S. President Franklin D. Roosevelt issued an executive order forbidding discrimination in employment by a company working under a government defense contract, that economic discrimination took on the overtones it has today, which is discrimination against minorities. By 1960, anti-trust laws and interstate commerce laws had effectively regulated inter-corporate discrimination so problematic in the late nineteenth and early twentieth centuries, but the problem of discrimination on an economic basis against minorities had become widespread.

== Causes ==
There is a wide range of theory concerned with the root causes of economic discrimination. Economic discrimination is unique from most other kinds of discrimination because only a small portion of it is due to racism, but rather is due to what has been called a "cynical realization that minorities are not always your best customers". There are three main causes that most economic theorists agree are likely root causes.

=== Animosity ===
Racism, sexism, ageism, and dislike for another's religion, ethnicity or nationality have always been components of economic discrimination, much like all other forms of discrimination.

Most discrimination in the US and Europe is claimed to be in terms of racial and ethnic discrimination—mostly blacks and Hispanics in the US, Muslims in Europe. In most parts of the world, women are held to lower positions, lower pay, and restricted opportunities of land ownership or economic incentive to enter businesses or start them. This case remains the same for racial minorities in certain countries. For example, a study conducted by Nuffield College in the UK found that using identical CVs and cover letters, BAME job applicants had to apply for 60% more jobs to receive the same number of callbacks as white applicants.

This form of economic discrimination is usually performed by whatever groups are held to be "in power" at the time. For example, in America, discrimination is often considered to be the province of Caucasians, while in Saudi Arabia, it's men who are considered discriminatory. One study suggests that the increase in equal opportunity lawsuits has reduced this kind of discrimination in America by a large amount.

=== Cost and revenue ===
There is a certain opportunity cost in dealing with some minorities, particularly in highly divided nations or nations where discrimination is tolerated.

A second common reason for this kind of discrimination is when the worker or consumer is not cost-efficient. For example, some stores in the US Northwest do not stock ethnic foods, despite requests for such, since they feel the cost is too high for too low a return.

Additionally, the illegal immigration debate in the US has resulted in some businesses refusing to hire such workers based on the likelihood that they would be fined and litigated against.

=== Efficiency ===
In some cases, minorities are discriminated against simply because it is inefficient to make a concerted effort at a fair allocation. For example, in countries where minorities make up a very small part of the population, or are on average less educated than the population average, there is rarely an attempt to focus on employment of minorities.

The Equal Opportunity Employment Act in the US has almost reduced this sort of rationale for discrimination to nothing, according to recent studies.

The relations between economic theory, efficiency and discrimination, or "discriminatory tastes" are much more problematic. Some critics of the concept of a "taste-based" view of discrimination have cited many reasons. One claim against this view is that viewing discrimination as a consumer preference outside of the scope of regulation could make economists indifferent towards its negative effects. Other reasons use the fact that discrimination often exists as a system which feeds on itself as evidence that it can't be viewed in the same way that people could prefer McDonalds over Burger King.

=== History and tradition ===
The foundations and roots of economic discrimination lie in history. Discrimination of minorities is a cycle the continues to repeat itself around the world due to historic views and the remnants of generations passed.

Slavery is often referred to as America's 'original sin' as the root of all contemporary racial problems stem from the era. It is racially prejudiced events like this that cause issues like racial residential segregation which persists to cause huge economic problems for African Americans in contemporary US society. In 2020, the funding of schools in white areas was $23 billion higher than the funding of schools in traditionally African American areas.

Wage gaps for minorities are also founded in history. Prejudice against women in high-paid jobs has been carried through generations with women frequently given the domestic worker role that history and tradition have given them. In 2011, a study was conducted by the CMI that predicts that the gender pay gap will not be closed until 2109. Furthermore, the racial pay gap in the US was caused by the prejudice of traditional racist views, in 2020, black families had a median household income of just over $41,000, however, white families have a median household income of more than $70,000. Throughout history the groups that are "in power" have remained the same and it is this power dynamic that continues to cause economic discrimination for minorities.

== Forms ==
There are several forms of economic discrimination. The most common form of discrimination is wage inequality, followed by unequal hiring practices. But there is also discrimination against minority consumers and minority businesses in a number of areas, and religious or ethnic discrimination in countries outside the United States.

=== Against workers ===
Most forms of discrimination against minorities involve lower wages and unequal hiring practices.

==== Wage discrimination ====
Several studies have shown that, in the United States, several minority groups, including black men and women, Hispanic men and women, white women, gay men of any race and trans people of any race suffer from decreased wage earning for the same job with the same performance levels and responsibilities as heterosexual white and Asian males. Numbers vary from study to study, but most indicate a gap from 5 to 15% lower earnings on average, between an affected minority and other groups.

Studies by experts from Harvard University and the University of Chicago have shown that, at least for some career paths like those of MBA graduates, the pay gap for women is largely due to time taken off to care for children. Their work has shown that the earnings of male and female MBA graduates from top US business schools are nearly identical at the outset of their careers. However, a decade after completing their degree, male graduates begin to earn more than female graduates. Researchers found that three factors account for the gap in earnings: differences in training prior to MBA graduation, differences in career interruptions, and differences in weekly hours. Female graduates had less training outside of their formal MBA, were more likely to take time off to provide full time childcare, and worked fewer hours per week on average. However, these findings appear to be changing as more men are seeking out careers that allow for flexibility in child care and some female dominant fields, like obstetrics, are developing new ways to increase work-life balance.

A recent study indicated that black wages in the US have fluctuated between 70% and 80% of white wages for the entire period from 1954 to 1999, and that wage increases for that period of time for blacks and white women increased at half the rate of that of white males. Other studies show similar patterns for Hispanics. Studies involving women found similar or even worse rates.

Another study indicated that Muslims earned almost 25% less on average than whites in France, Germany, and England, while in South America, mixed-race blacks earned half of what Hispanics did in Brazil.

Most wage discrimination is masked by the fact that it tends to occur in lower-paying positions and involves minorities who may not feel empowered to file a discrimination lawsuit or complain.

UK – On 10 October 2018 the Prime Minister, Theresa May, launched a three-month consultation with businesses on how large businesses would have to report the pay gap between staff of different ethnicities.

==== Hiring discrimination ====
Hiring discrimination is similar to wage discrimination in its pattern. It typically consists of employers choosing to hire a certain race candidate over a minority candidate, or a male candidate over a female candidate, to fill a position. A study of employment patterns in the US indicated that the number of hiring discrimination cases has increased fivefold in the past 20 years. However, their percentage as a whole fraction of the workforce hirings has decreased almost as drastically. With the stiff laws against discrimination in hiring, companies are very careful in who they hire and do not hire.

Even so, studies have shown that it is easier for a white male to get a job than it is for an equally qualified man of color or woman of any race. Many positions are cycled, where a company fills a position with a worker and then lays them off and hires a new person, repeating until they find someone they feel is "suitable"—which is often not a minority.

While hiring discrimination is the most highly visible aspect of economic discrimination, it is often the most uncommon. Increasingly strong measures against discrimination have made hiring discrimination much more difficult for employers to engage in. However this is only the case in formal hiring arrangements, with corporations or others subject to public scrutiny and overview. Private hiring, such as apprenticeships of electricians, plumbers, carpenters, and other trades is almost entirely broken down along racial lines, with almost no women in these fields and most minorities training those of their own race.

=== Against consumers ===
Most discrimination against consumers has been decreased due to stiffer laws against such practices, but still continues, both in the US and in Europe. The most common forms of such discrimination are price and service discrimination.

==== Discrimination based on price ====
Discrimination based on price is charging different prices for goods and services to different people based on their race, ethnicity, religion, or sex. It should not be confused with the separate economic concept of price discrimination. Discrimination based on price includes, but is not limited to:

- increased costs for basic services (health care, repair, etc.)
- increased costs for per diem charges (such as charging one person $40 while charging another person $100 for exactly the same service provided)
- not offering deals, sales, rebates, etc. to minorities
- higher rates for insurance for minorities

Most charges of discrimination based on price are difficult to verify, without significant documentation. Studies indicate that less than 10% of all discrimination based on price is actually reported to any authority or regulatory body, and much of this is through class-action lawsuits. Furthermore, while a number of monitoring services and consumer interest groups take an interest in this form of discrimination, there is very little they can do to change it. Most discrimination based on price occurs in situations without a standardized price list that can be compared against. In the cases of per diem charges, this is easily concealed as few consumers can exchange estimates and work rates, and even if they do the business in question can claim that the services provided had different baseline costs, conditions, etc.

Discrimination based on price in areas where special sales and deals simply are not offered can be justified by limiting them to those with strong credit ratings or those with past business with the company in question.

==== Services discrimination ====
Although price discrimination mentions services, service discrimination is when certain services are not offered at all to minorities, or are offered only inferior versions. According to at least one study, most consumer discrimination falls into this category, since it is more difficult to verify and prove. Some assertions of discrimination have included:

- offering only high-cost plans for insurance or refusal to cover minorities
- refusing to offer financing to minorities
- denial of service

=== Against businesses ===
Minority owned businesses can also experience discrimination, both from suppliers and from banks and other sources of capital financing. In the US, there are tax benefits and even public relations benefits from having minority-owned businesses, so most instances of this occur outside of the United States.

Women of color are starting businesses at rates three to five times faster than all other businesses, according to an article from Babson College on "State of Businesses Owned by Women of Color" (Press release). Newswise. May 9, 2008. However, once in business, their growth lags behind all other firms, according to the results of a multi-year study conducted by the Center for Women's Business Research in partnership with Babson College exploring the impact of race and gender on the growth of businesses owned by women who are African-American, Asian, Latina and other ethnicities.

==== Discrete usage discrimination ====
This form of discrimination covers suppliers providing substandard goods to a business, or price gouging the business on purchases and resupply orders.

==== Capital investment discrimination ====
A more significant source of perceived discrimination is in capital investment markets. Banks are often accused of not providing loans and other financial instruments for inner-city minority owned businesses. Most research indicates that the banking industry as a whole is systemic in its abuse of the legal system in avoidance of "high risk" loans to minorities, pointing out that banks cannot provide facts backing up their assertions that they deny such loans to a high failure rate.

On the other hand, most financial institutions and some economists feel that all too often, banks are accused unfairly of discrimination against minority owned businesses when said business is simply not worth such a credit risk, and that no one would find such a decision discriminatory if the business were not minority owned. These charges of reverse racism or prejudicial analysis are a longstanding source of controversy in the study of economic discrimination.

== Global economic discrimination ==
An increasing number of economists and international commerce theorists have suggested that economic discrimination goes far beyond the bounds of individuals or businesses. The largest scale forms of economic discrimination, and the widest ranging, affect entire nations or global regions. Many consider that an open world economic system (globalization), which includes world bodies such as the International Monetary Fund (IMF), World Bank, and International Bank for Reconstruction and Development (IBRD), places countries at risk by practicing explicitly discriminatory techniques such as bilateral and regional bargaining, as well as asymmetrical trade balances and the maintaining of cheap force labor. Trade policies like the North American Free Trade Agreement (NAFTA) and General Agreement on Tariffs and Trade (GATT) are often regarded as financial measures serving to economically oppress Third World nations.

This could include:

- Unfavorable terms for monetary support from world banking institutions
- Coercive diplomacy to supplant local, regional or national leaders in favor of those who will act as demanded by foreign investors
- Increased prices for supplying basic medical supplies to nations based on ethnic or religious basis
- Refusal of trade agreements
- Restrictive trade agreements

== See also ==
- Aporophobia
- Black triangle (badge)
- Civil disability
- Caste discrimination
- Caste discrimination in the United States
- Class discrimination
- Criticism of credit scoring systems in the United States
- Gender-based price discrimination in the United States
- Economic racism
- Social inequality
- Racial discrimination
- Statistical discrimination
