= Marriage prohibition =

Prohibitions against marriage

Throughout human history, there have been many prohibitions on those who can undergo marriage. These are for a variety of reasons, including the grounds of age, sex, consanguinity, coercion, previous or existing marital status, as well as religion, race, caste or disability. A marriage which is prohibited is called a void marriage; there are also categories of marriage which are voidable marriages, which may be annulled on request.

Many of these restrictions are enforced by law; however, some may be prohibited not by law but by religious or cultural customs.

== Marriageable age ==
Marriageable age is the minimum legal age of marriage. Age and other prerequisites to marriage vary between jurisdictions, but in the vast majority of jurisdictions, the marriageable age as a right is set at the age of majority. Nevertheless, most jurisdictions allow marriage at a younger age with parental or judicial approval, especially if the female is pregnant. Among most indigenous cultures, people marry at fifteen, the age of sexual maturity for both the male and the female. In industrialized cultures, the age of marriage is most commonly 18 years old, but there are variations, and the marriageable age should not be confused with the age of majority or the age of consent, though they may be the same.

The 55 parties to the 1962 Convention on Consent to Marriage, Minimum Age for Marriage, and Registration of Marriages have agreed to specify a minimum marriageable age by statute law‚ to override customary, religious, tribal laws and traditions. When the marriageable age under a law of a religious community is lower than that under the law of the land, the state law prevails. However, some religious communities do not accept the supremacy of state law in this respect, which may lead to child marriage or forced marriage.

The 123 parties to the 1956 Supplementary Convention on the Abolition of Slavery have agreed to adopt a prescribed "suitable" minimum age for marriage. In many developing countries, the official age prescriptions stand as mere guidelines. UNICEF, the United Nations children's organization, regards a marriage of a minor (legal child), a person below the adult age, as child marriage and a violation of rights.

Until recently, the minimum marriageable age for females was lower in many jurisdictions than for males, on the premise that females mature at an earlier age than males. This law has been viewed by some to be discriminatory, so that in many countries the marriageable age of females has been raised to equal that of males.

== Same-sex marriage ==
In most cultures, marriage has traditionally been restricted to marriage between a man and a woman. Same-sex marriage, also known as gay marriage or same-gender marriage, is the marriage of two people of the same legal sex or gender. As of 2025, marriage between same-sex couples is legally performed and recognized in 38 countries, with a total population of 1.5 billion people (20% of the world's population). The most recent jurisdiction to legalize same-sex marriage is Thailand.

Same-sex marriage is legally recognized in a large majority of the world's developed countries; notable exceptions are Italy, Japan, South Korea, and the Czech Republic. Adoption rights are not necessarily covered, though most states with same-sex marriage allow those couples to jointly adopt as other married couples can. Some countries, such as Nigeria and Russia, restrict advocacy for same-sex marriage. A few of these are among the 35 countries (as of 2023) that constitutionally define marriage to prevent marriage between couples of the same sex, with most of those provisions enacted in recent decades as a preventative measure.

== Consanguine marriage ==
Consanguine marriage is marriage between individuals who are closely related. Though it may involve incest, it implies more than the sexual nature of incest. In a clinical sense, marriage between two family members who are second cousins or closer qualifies as consanguineous marriage. This is based on the gene copies their offspring may receive. Though these unions are still prevalent in some communities, as seen across the Greater Middle East region, many other populations have seen a great decline in intra-family marriages.

== Forced marriage ==
Forced marriage is a marriage in which one or more of the parties is married without their consent or against their will. A marriage can also become a forced marriage even if both parties enter with full consent if one or both are later forced to stay in the marriage against their will.

A forced marriage differs from an arranged marriage, in which both parties presumably consent to the assistance of their parents or a third party such as a matchmaker in finding and choosing a spouse. There is often a continuum of coercion used to compel a marriage, ranging from outright physical violence to subtle psychological pressure.

Though now widely condemned by international opinion, forced marriages still take place in various cultures across the world, particularly in parts of South Asia and Africa. Some scholars object to use of the term "forced marriage" because it invokes the consensual legitimating language of marriage (such as husband/wife) for an experience that is precisely the opposite. A variety of alternative terms have been proposed, including forced conjugal association and conjugal slavery.

The United Nations views forced marriage as a form of human rights abuse, since it violates the principle of the freedom and autonomy of individuals. The Universal Declaration of Human Rights states that a person's right to choose a spouse and enter freely into marriage is central to their life and dignity, and their equality as a human being. The Roman Catholic Church deems forced marriage grounds for granting an annulment—for a marriage to be valid both parties must give their consent freely. The Supplementary Convention on the Abolition of Slavery also prohibits marriage without right to refusal by both parties and requires a minimum age for marriage to prevent this. Similarly, the International Labour Organization recognizes forced marriage as a form of modern slavery.

== Sham marriage ==
A sham marriage is one where the marriage is solely for some form of advantage, without any intention of a real relationship. A common reason for sham marriages is to enable immigration as the spous of a citizen.

== Polygamy and bigamy ==
Polygamy is illegal and prosecuted as a crime in most of the countries of the world. Exceptions include numerous African and Asian countries with large Muslim populations. In some of these countries polygamous marriage is only allowed for Muslims.

== Remarriage ==
TBD

== Religion ==
Interfaith marriage, sometimes called interreligious marriage or mixed marriage, is marriage between spouses professing and being legally part of different religions. Although interfaith marriages are often established as civil marriages, in some instances they may be established as a religious marriage. This depends on the religious doctrine of each of the two parties' religions; some prohibit interfaith marriage, and among others there are varying degrees of permissibility.

== Racial and caste discrimination ==
In the U.S., civil laws that proscribed "the mixing of the races" were enforced until 1967, yet remained black-letter law until the year 2000; in Nazi Germany (1933–1945) the Nuremberg Laws were effective from 1935 until 1945; in Fascist Italy (1922–1945) the Italian racial laws were in effect from 1938 until 1944 and in the successor Italian Social Republic in effect from 1943 until 1945; and in post-war Apartheid South Africa (1948-1994), the anti-miscegenation laws were in effect from 1949 until 1985.

Inter-caste marriage is disapproved of in many parts of the Indian subcontient and nearby countries, and some still regard it as socially taboo. This is a form of caste discrimination. In some cases, inter-caste marriage can result in "honour killings".

== Eugenics ==
The eugenics movement of the 19th and 20th centuries led to a number of attempts to restrict marriage based on eugenic considerations. In the United States, "eugenic marriage laws" were passed in the 1930s based on eugenics principles, based on medical examinations before marriage.

Public acceptance of eugenic ideas in the U.S. led to various state legislatures working to establish eugenic initiatives. Beginning with Connecticut in 1896, many states enacted marriage laws with eugenic criteria, prohibiting anyone who was "epileptic, imbecile or feeble-minded" from marrying.

A number of European nations followed suit, including Denmark, Finland, Iceland, Norway, Sweden, and Nazi Germany.

Eugenics was also used as a justification for "anti-miscegenation laws" prohibiting interracial marriage.

== Sexually transmitted disease ==
Mandatory premarital medical examination laws were created in some states of the United States and other countries. Some of these laws are still in effect. The two diseases that created the most concern among legislators were syphilis and HIV infection.

== Non-human marriage ==
It is universally the case that marriage can only be between two human beings, and not between humans and animals or inanimate objects. Nevertheless, some people have stated that they wish to be married to non-human objects, or that they consider themselves to already be so. No such marriages are legal, and any attempt to create one is void.

== See also ==
- Voidable marriage
- Void marriage
