= Phene =

A phene generates the phenotypic dynamics that form measurable phenotypes as a set of traits which can be possessed by an organism, such as tissue color, height, behavior, organ shape and organization. Sets of phenes constitute the Phenome that generate the phenotypic dynamics forming phenotype in the Phenomics approach.

== Phene – phenotype – phenome distinction ==
The term 'phene' was evidently coined as an obvious parallel construct to 'gene'. Phene is to Phenotype as Gene is to Genotype, and Similarly Phene is to Phenome as Gene is to Genome. More specifically, a Phene is an abstract concept describing a particular characteristic which can be possessed by an organism. Whereas Phenotype refers to a collection of Phenes possessed by a particular organism, and Phenome refers to the entire set of Phenes that exist within an organism or species.

Genome wide association studies use "phenes" or "traits" (symptoms) to distinguish groups in the human population. These groups are then employed to identify associations with genetic alleles that are more common in the symptomatic group than in the asymptomatic control group. Allen et al. report that with respect to Schizophrenia "Research in molecular genetics has focused on detecting multiple genes of small effect" This indicates the importance of discovering individual traits or "phenes" that are governed by single genes. Schizophrenia or bipolar disorder may be described as a phenotype but how many individual traits or "phenes" contribute to these phenotypes? Very large genome wide association studies have not found many significant gene linkages. On the contrary the results of these studies implicate a large number of gene alleles that have a very small effect (phene).

The word phenotype was originally used to refer to both the trait/character itself (e.g. the blue eyes phenotype) and the set of traits/characteristics possessed by the organism (clair's eye-colour phenotype is blue). While this definition is still used in many places, the lack of distinction can make in-depth explanations confusing and thus use of the term Phene becomes necessary. Indeed, it is extremely difficult to determine precisely what the fundamental building blocks of a phenome are. Since the term "phenotype" has been used to describe traits and syndromes and population characteristics it is not helpful in the collective search for specific traits that could be a consequence of a single gene or gene–environmental interaction. Phene has emerged as a candidate building block for the phenome.

== Phene – gene distinction ==
Genes give rise to phenes. Genes are the biochemical instructions encoding what an organism can be, while phenes are what the organism is. In general it takes a combination of particular genes, environmental influences and random variation to give rise to any one phene in an organism. Both phenes and genes are subject to evolution. However, if one defines "genes" as "DNA sequences encoding polypeptides", they are not directly accessible to natural selection; the associated phenes are. Note that some, e.g. Richard Dawkins, have used a wider definition of "gene" than the one used in genetics on occasion, extending it to any DNA sequence with a function.

Due to the distinct chemical and physical properties of the nucleotides in the DNA and some mutations being "silent" (that is, not altering gene expression), the DNA primary sequence may also be a phene. For example, A–T and C–G base pairs are differently resistant to heat (see also DNA–DNA hybridisation). In a thermophilic microorganism, "silent" mutations may have an effect on DNA stability and thus survival. While being subject to evolution, natural selection affects the primary sequence directly in this case, with or without it being expressed.

Consider, for example, a mutation that makes a zygote abort development as a young embryo. This mutation, obviously, will not spread, as it is quickly fatal. It is not the mutated nucleotide that is selected against, but the fact that due to this mutation, the phene (a key enzyme or developmental factor for example) does not get expressed.

Compare a (fictional) kind of mutation that breaks the DNA strand in a crucial position and defies all attempts to repair it, leading to cell death. Here, the mutated and unmutated DNA sequences would be phenes themselves; it is the changed primary sequence itself which by failing would cause death, not the corresponding polypeptide.

See also Dawkin's concept of extended phenotype.

== Origin ==
The term has been widely adopted by the academic community and appears in scientific literature. A quick keyword search of titles and abstracts containing "phene" at PubMed returns many articles. It is a valuable concept in the genomic era where "phenes" or "traits" (symptoms) are used to distinguish groups with genetic disorders.

== Usages ==
"Phene" is used as to refer to relevant phenotypic traits in the OMIA (Online Mendelian Inheritance in Animals) database. One of the objectives of the OMIA is to match genotypes to phenotypes. Lenffer et al. (2006) describe the OMIA as a "comparative biology resource" "(The) OMIA is a comprehensive resource of phenotypic information on heritable animal traits and genes in a strongly comparative context, relating traits to genes where possible. OMIA is modelled on and is complementary to Online Mendelian Inheritance in Man (OMIM)." The term "phene" is equated with "trait".

== See also ==
- Phenotype
- Phenotypic trait
- Phenomics
- Phenome
- Online Mendelian Inheritance in Man (a database of human phenes)
