= Simple Mendelian genetics in humans =

Mendelian traits behave according to the model of monogenic or simple gene inheritance in which one gene corresponds to one trait. Discrete traits (as opposed to continuously varying traits such as height) with simple Mendelian inheritance patterns are relatively rare in nature, and many of the clearest examples in humans cause disorders. Discrete traits found in humans are common examples for teaching genetics.

== Mendelian model ==
According to the model of Mendelian inheritance, alleles may be dominant or recessive, one allele is inherited from each parent, and only those who inherit a recessive allele from each parent exhibit the recessive phenotype. Offspring with either one or two copies of the dominant allele will display the dominant phenotype.

Very few phenotypes are purely Mendelian traits. Common violations of the Mendelian model include incomplete dominance, codominance, genetic linkage, environmental effects, and quantitative contributions from a number of genes (see: gene interactions, polygenic inheritance, oligogenic inheritance).

OMIM (Online Mendelian Inheritance in Man) is a comprehensive database of human genotype–phenotype links. Many visible human traits that exhibit high heritability were included in the older McKusick's Mendelian Inheritance in Man. Before the discovery of genotyping, they were used as genetic markers in medicolegal practice, including in cases of disputed paternity.

== Human traits with probable or uncertain simple inheritance patterns ==
Dominant	Recessive	References
Low heart rate	High heart rate	
Widow's peak	Straight hair line	
Facial dimples	No facial dimples	
Ability to taste PTC, "Taster"	Unable to taste PTC, "Nontaster"	
Unattached (free) earlobe	Attached earlobe	
Clockwise hair direction (left to right)	Counter-Clockwise hair direction (right to left)	
Cleft chin	Smooth chin	
Freckles	No freckles	
Wet-type earwax	Dry-type earwax	
Roman nose	No prominent bridge	
Marfan syndrome	Average body proportions and connective tissue	
Huntington's disease	No nerve damage	
Normal mucous lining	Cystic fibrosis	
Photic sneeze reflex	No light-induced sneeze reflex	
Forged chin	Receding chin	
White forelock present	No white forelock	
Ligamentous angustus	Ligamentous Laxity	
Ability to eat sugar	Galactosemia	
Total leukonychia and Bart pumphrey syndrome	Partial leukonychia	
Absence of fish-like body odour	Trimethylaminuria	
Primary hyperhidrosis	Little sweating in hands	
Lactase persistence	Lactose intolerance	
Prominent chin (V-shaped)	Less prominent chin (U-shaped)	
Acne prone	Clear complexion	

== See also ==
- Polygenic inheritance
- Trait
- Gene interaction
- Dominance
- Homozygote
- Heterozygote
