= Online Mendelian Inheritance in Animals =

Catalogue of inherited disorders

Online Mendelian Inheritance in Animals (OMIA) is an online database of genes, inherited disorders and traits in more than 550 animal species. It is modelled on, and is complementary to, Online Mendelian Inheritance in Man (OMIM). It aims to provide a publicly accessible catalogue of all animal phenes, excluding those in human and mouse, for which species specific resources are already available (OMIM, MLC). Authored by Professor Frank Nicholas of the University of Sydney, with some contribution from colleagues, the database contains textual information and references as well as links to relevant PubMed and Gene records at the NCBI.

OMIA is hosted by the University of Sydney, with an Entrez mirror located at the NCBI.

== See also ==
- Medical classification
- Online Mendelian Inheritance in Man (OMIM)
