= PhenomicDB =

PhenomicDB is a free phenotype oriented database. It contains data for some of the main model organisms such as Homo sapiens, Mus musculus, Drosophila melanogaster, and others. PhenomicDB merges and structures phenotypic data from various public sources: WormBase, FlyBase, NCBI Gene, MGI and ZFIN using clustering algorithms. The website is now offline.
