= Caste discrimination =

Caste discrimination can refer to:

- Caste discrimination in India
- Caste discrimination in Sri Lanka
- Caste discrimination in the United States

== See also ==
- Caste (disambiguation)
