= Phenotypic trait =

Inherited characteristic of an organism

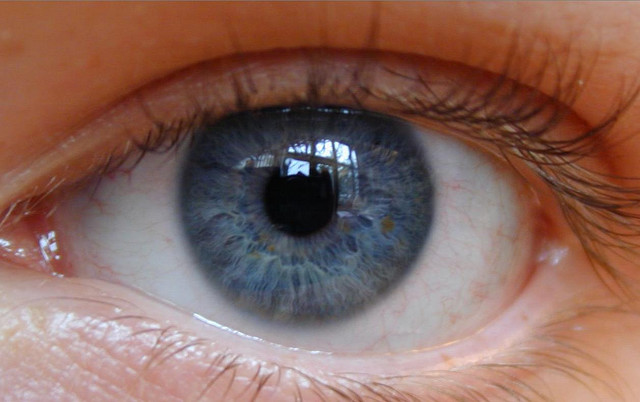
The deep blue (specific) eye color is an example of a phenotypic trait (a variant of the eye color phenotypic character)

A phenotypic trait, simply trait, or character state is any distinct variant of a phenotypic, or observable, characteristic of an organism; it may be either inherited or determined environmentally but typically occurs as a combination of the two. For example, having eye color is a character of an organism, while blue, brown and hazel versions of eye color are traits. The term trait is generally used in genetics, often to describe the phenotypic expression of different combinations of alleles in different individual organisms within a single population, such as the famous purple vs. white flower coloration in Gregor Mendel's pea plants. By contrast, in systematics, the term character state is employed to describe features that represent fixed diagnostic differences among taxa, such as the absence of tails in great apes, relative to other primate groups.

== Definition ==
A phenotypic trait is an obvious, observable, and measurable characteristic of an organism; it is the expression of genes in an observable way. An example of a phenotypic trait is a specific hair color or eye color. Underlying genes, that make up the genotype, determine the hair color, but the hair color observed is the phenotype.

The phenotype is dependent on the genetic make-up of the organism, but is also influenced by the environmental conditions that the organism was subjected to during its ontogenetic development, including various epigenetic processes.

Regardless of the degree of influence of genotype versus environment, the phenotype encompasses all of the characteristics of an organism, including traits at multiple levels of biological organization, ranging from behavior and life history traits (e.g., litter size), through morphology (e.g., body height and composition), physiology (e.g., blood pressure), cellular characteristics (e.g., membrane lipid composition, mitochondrial densities), components of biochemical pathways, and even messenger RNA.

== Genetic origin of traits in diploid organisms ==
Different phenotypic traits are caused by different forms of genes, or alleles, which arise by mutation in a single individual and are passed on to successive generations.

== Biochemistry of dominance and extensions to expression of traits ==
The biochemistry of the intermediate proteins determines how they interact in the cell. Therefore, biochemistry predicts how different combinations of alleles will produce varying traits.

Extended expression patterns seen in diploid organisms include facets of incomplete dominance, codominance, and multiple alleles. Incomplete dominance is the condition in which neither allele dominates the other in one heterozygote. Instead the phenotype is intermediate in heterozygotes. Thus you can tell that each allele is present in the heterozygote. Codominance refers to the allelic relationship that occurs when two alleles are both expressed in the heterozygote, and both phenotypes are seen simultaneously. Multiple alleles refers to the situation when there are more than 2 common alleles of a particular gene. Blood groups in humans is a classic example. The ABO blood group proteins are important in determining blood type in humans, and this is determined by different alleles of the one locus.

== Continuum versus categorical traits ==
Schizotypy is an example of a psychological phenotypic trait found in schizophrenia-spectrum disorders. Studies have shown that gender and age influences the expression of schizotypal traits. For instance, certain schizotypal traits may develop further during adolescence, whereas others stay the same during this period.

== See also ==
- Allometric engineering of traits
- Character displacement
- Phene
- Phenotype
- Phenomics
- Phenome
- Race (taxonomy)
- Skill
