= Harry H. Laughlin =

American eugenicist (1880–1943)

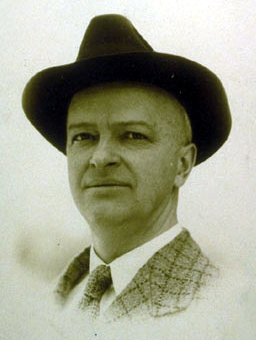
- Laughlin, c. 1929
- Born: Harry Hamilton Laughlin; March 11, 1880; Oskaloosa, Iowa, U.S.
- Died: January 26, 1943 (aged 62); Missouri, U.S.
- Education: District Normal School (BA); Princeton University (DSc)
- Occupations: Educator and eugenicist
- Spouse: Pansy Laughlin

Harry Hamilton Laughlin (March 11, 1880 – January 26, 1943) was an American educator and eugenicist. He served as the superintendent of the Eugenics Record Office from its inception in 1910 to its closure in 1939, and was among the most active individuals influencing American eugenics policy, especially compulsory sterilization legislation.

== Biography ==
=== Early life ===
Harry Hamilton Laughlin was born March 11, 1880, in Oskaloosa, Iowa. He graduated from the First District Normal School (now Truman State University) in Kirksville, Missouri. In 1917, he earned a Doctor of Science degree from Princeton University in the field of cytology.

=== Career ===
==== Eugenics Record Office ====
He worked as a high school teacher and principal before his interest turned to eugenics. This led to his correspondence with Charles Davenport, an early researcher into Mendelian inheritance in the United States. In 1910, Davenport asked Laughlin to move to Long Island, New York, to serve as the superintendent of his new research office.

The Eugenics Record Office (ERO) was founded at Cold Spring Harbor, New York, by Davenport with initial support from Mary Williamson Averell (Mrs. E. H. Harriman) and John Harvey Kellogg, and later by the Carnegie Institution of Washington. Laughlin was appointed as managing director and pursued the goals of the institution, even co-writing a eugenical comedy in four acts for performance at the ERO for the amusement of field workers being trained. He regularly lectured to groups around the United States.

Laughlin provided extensive statistical testimony to the United States Congress in support of the Johnson-Reed Immigration Act of 1924. Part of his testimony dealt with "excessive" insanity among immigrants from southern Europe and eastern Europe. He also argued that most Jews were born feeble-minded. Bacterial geneticist Herbert Spencer Jennings, condemned Laughlin's statistics as invalid because they compared recent immigrants to more settled immigrants. Economist Joseph M. Gillman criticized the statistical analysis and research methodology of Laughlin's work, arguing that there were rudimentary statistics errors, as well as selection bias. For instance, Laughlin asserted that various forms of "degeneracy" were innate to certain racial groups of recent immigrants by looking at populations in asylums and homes for the disabled. However, he failed to account for the fact that racial groups of older immigrant communities were more likely to take care of their disabled at home rather than place them in institutions, which was not the case for smaller recent immigrant groups who may not have family in the country to take care of them.

He was eventually appointed as an expert eugenics agent to the Committee on Immigration and Naturalization (the 1924 law applied national-origin quotas on immigrants, which stopped the large Italian and Russian influx of the early 1900s).

In 1927, the Eugenics Research Association, of which Laughlin was an officer, began a study of the heritage of U.S. Senators. Some senators were enthusiastic while others reluctantly complied, and Senator William Cabell Bruce questioned whether eugenics was even a science and refused to participate. Laughlin wrote to Bruce's hometown newspaper in an attempt to gain the information.

==== Sterilization laws ====
One of Laughlin's interests was to encourage the proliferation of compulsory sterilization legislation in the United States, to sterilize the "unfit" members of the population. By 1914, twelve states had already passed sterilization laws, beginning with Indiana in 1907 and Connecticut in 1909. However, the laws were not employed with significant vigor, with the exception of California. In his study of this, Laughlin quickly realized that much of the state sterilization legislation was poorly worded, leaving it open to questions of constitutionality and confusion over bureaucratic responsibility. As a result, Laughlin drafted the Model Eugenical Sterilization Law, a model act for compulsory sterilization, intended to obviate these difficulties. He published the proposal in his 1922 study of American sterilization policy, Eugenical Sterilization in the United States. It included as subjects for eugenic sterilization: the feeble-minded, the insane, criminals, epileptics, alcoholics, blind persons, deaf persons, deformed persons, and indigent persons. An additional eighteen states passed laws based on Laughlin's model, including Virginia in 1924.

The first person ordered sterilized in Virginia under the new law was Carrie Buck, on the grounds that she was a "probable potential parent of socially inadequate offspring." A lawsuit ensued and Laughlin, who had never met Buck, gave a deposition endorsing her suitability for sterilization, calling the family members of Buck "the shiftless, ignorant, and worthless class of anti-social whites of the South". Other scientists from the ERO testified in person. The state won the case, which was appealed to the United States Supreme Court in 1927. The resulting case, Buck v. Bell, upheld the constitutionality of the laws that Laughlin helped write. Five months after the court confirmed the law, Carrie Buck was sterilized. A law allowing for the sterilization of repeat criminals was overturned in 1942, in Skinner v. Oklahoma, but sterilizations of mental patients continued into the 1970s. Altogether more than 60,000 Americans were sterilized. Virginia repealed its sterilization law in 1974. Laughlin also supported the passage of Virginia's Racial Integrity Act, which outlawed miscegenation. In 1967, the U.S. Supreme Court overturned that law in Loving v. Virginia.

==== Association with German eugenics ====
The Reichstag of Nazi Germany passed the Law for the Prevention of Hereditarily Diseased Offspring in 1933, closely based on Laughlin's model. Between 35,000 and 80,000 persons were sterilized in the first full year alone (it is now known that over 350,000 persons were sterilized). Laughlin was awarded an honorary degree by the University of Heidelberg in 1936 for his work on behalf of the "science of racial cleansing." However, reports about the extensive use of compulsory sterilization in Germany began to appear in US newspapers. By the end of the decade, eugenics had become associated with Nazism and poor science. Support for groups like the American Eugenics Society began to fade. In 1935, a review panel convened by the Carnegie Institute concluded that the ERO's research did not have scientific merit. By 1939, the institute withdrew funding for the ERO, which was forced to close.

Laughlin was a founding member of the Pioneer Fund, and was its first president, serving from 1937 to 1941. The Pioneer Fund was created by Wickliffe Draper in order to promote the "betterment of the race" through eugenics. Draper had been supporting the Eugenics Research Association and its Eugenical News since 1932. One of the first projects that Laughlin pursued for the Fund was the distribution of two films from Germany depicting the success of eugenics programs in that country.

Laughlin lobbied to keep immigration barriers enforced during the Nazi Holocaust, preventing Jews from reaching safety in the United States. A biographer has described Laughlin as "among the most racist and anti-Semitic of early twentieth-century eugenicists."

==== World government ====
As well as his interest in eugenics, Laughlin was fascinated by the idea of establishing a world government. He worked on his plans for this throughout his adult life. The world government model that he devised was loosely based on the U.S. Constitution and the League of Nations. The allotment of representation in the body was heavily biased in favor of Europe and North America, particularly the United Kingdom and the United States. Laughlin believed that his world government model would promote the eugenicist aim of preventing the intermixing of different races. Many leading internationalists expressed interest in Laughlin's world government plan; these included Edward M. House, Woodrow Wilson's foreign policy adviser.

=== Retirement and death ===
Laughlin and his wife Pansy married in 1902; the couple did not have children. Laughlin was pressured into retirement by Vannevar Bush in 1939, after a series of severe seizures. These seizures may have been due to hereditary epilepsy. After his retirement from the Eugenics Record Office, the couple returned to Kirksville in December 1939. Laughlin died January 26, 1943, and was buried near his father and mother in Highland Park Cemetery in Kirksville.

== See also ==
- Eugenics in the United States
- E. S. Gosney
- Madison Grant
- Human Betterment Foundation
- Paul B. Popenoe
