= Sterilization of Native American women =

Controversial medical practice in US

In the 1960s and 1970s, the Indian Health Service (IHS) and collaborating physicians sustained a practice of performing sterilizations on Native American women, in many cases without the free and informed consent of their patients. Tactics for sterilization included healthcare providers neglecting to tell women they were going to be sterilized and forms of coercion such as threatening to take away welfare or healthcare. In some cases, women were misled into believing that the sterilization procedure was reversible. In yet other cases, sterilization was performed without the adequate understanding and consent of the patient, including cases in which the procedure was performed on minors as young as 11 years old.

The American eugenics movement set the foundations for the use of sterilization as a form of birth control, or a method to control populations of poor and minority women. This practice was widely seen in America throughout the early and middle decades of the 20th century. The compounding factor was that doctors tended to recommend sterilization to poor and minority women, where they would not have done so to a wealthier white patient. This trend of sterilization was seen widely amongst Native American populations. Many instances of abuse were documented throughout this practice. Following the abusive methods, the medical community often took an effort to mask their coercive tactics.

In 1976, a U.S. General Accountability Office (GAO) investigation found that four Indian Health Service areas were noncompliant with IHS policies regulating consent to sterilization. Inadequate consent forms were a recurring problem; the most common form did not record whether the elements of informed consent had been presented to the patient or what they were told prior to obtaining consent, and physician misunderstanding of IHS regulations was widespread. The investigation found that these four service areas sterilized 3,406 women between the years 1973 and 1976, including 36 cases where women under the age of 21 were sterilized despite a declared moratorium on these sterilizations.

Limitations of the GAO investigation were quickly noted. Senator James Abourezk pointed out that while even 3,406 sterilizations would represent a startling proportion of Native American women, this number was the result of a report which examined only four out of twelve IHS areas. Attempts to count the total number of sterilizations that happened during this period differ widely in their results. While the limited count by the GAO represents a minimum, studies have accused the IHS of sterilizing between 25 and 50% of Native American women from 1970 to 1976. Should the highest estimate be accurate, up to 70,000 women may have been sterilized over the period. In comparison, the rate of sterilization for white women over the same period was approximately 15%.

== History of forced sterilization ==
Native American women were not the only individuals to be subjected to forced sterilizations; black and poor women were also affected by these practices. The practice of eugenics stemmed from Francis Galton's writings on using genetics to improve the human race. The eugenics movement became increasingly popular, and in 1907, Indiana was America's first state to enact a compulsory sterilization law. The practice became normalized and over the next twenty years fifteen more states would enact similar laws.

In 1927, the Supreme Court case Buck v. Bell upheld a compulsory sterilization law in Virginia. The case involved three generations of women from the Buck family: Emma, Carrie and Vivian. By examining multiple generations of women from the same family, advocates for eugenics hoped to convince the Court that Carrie Buck had intellectual deficiencies that were hereditary and a danger to public welfare; they succeeded, and she was sterilized. Oliver Wendell Holmes' decision stated, "it is better for all the world if instead of waiting to execute degenerate offspring for crime, or to let them starve for their imbecility, society can prevent those who are manifestly unfit from continuing their kind. The principle that sanctions compulsory vaccination is broad enough to cover cutting the Fallopian tubes." The case had the effect of legitimizing existing sterilization laws, resulting in greater acceptance of the practice.

Before 1970, many white women were fighting for their right to receive voluntary sterilizations. In 1969, the court's Jessin v County of Shasta decision, it was ruled that sterilization was a fundamental right and legal with informed consent. This decision alleviated physicians fears that using sterilization for the sole purpose of birth control might be illegal, thus increasing the sterilizations of poor and minority women. During the 1960s and 70s as sterilization practices increased there was no legislation that prohibited it and it was seen as a viable form of contraception.

In the 1974 case Relf v. Weinberger, two poor, black, teenage girls in the Relf family had been sterilized without consent from themselves or their mother. The Supreme Court ruled that Department of Health and Human Services regulations on sterilization were "arbitrary and unreasonable" because they failed to adequately guarantee the consent of the patient.

This case was part of a growing awareness during the 1970s that abuse of sterilization procedures was becoming a serious problem. The court found that federal family planning funds were being used to sterilize between 100,000 and 150,000 people every year through means of coercion. Exposure from the case resulted in recognition that the poor and minorities were at risk of being targeted for sterilizations they did not consent to. This led to the legal requirement that informed consent be received before the operation and that availability of welfare not be leveraged against the patient to influence their decision. These requirements had already been considered by Congress before Relf, but Nixon's administration feared losing the Catholic vote and tabled them until after Nixon's 1972 reelection.

Despite the implementation of new requirements for performing sterilization procedures, unethical practices were slow to change. A 1976 report from the Government Accounting Office investigating Native American sterilization in the IHS found that the newly required informed consent forms did not meet regulations. They did not indicate sufficient evidence of oral and written consent being obtained. In addition, the report found that more than thirty women under twenty-one were sterilized without evidence that the procedures were medically necessary for reason other than sterilization. Reasons given for lack of compliance included physicians claiming to not have received or understood the new regulations. On three separate occasions between August 1973 and April 1974, physicians in the IHS received a clearly worded update on the regulations, so the claim from physicians that updates were not received or understood are not well supported.

== Indian Health Services ==
The IHS logo

The Indian Health Services (IHS) is a government organization created in 1955 to help combat poor health and living conditions of Native Americans and Alaska Natives. The IHS still exists in the United States, and is a blend of various organizations created to combat specific health problems for Native American and Alaskan Natives. The IHS's website states that "the IHS is the principal federal health care provider and health advocate for Indian people, and its goal is to raise their health status to the highest possible level. The IHS provides a comprehensive health service delivery system for approximately 2.2 million Native Americans and Alaska Natives who belong to 573 federally recognized tribes in 37 states." In 1955, Congress had given IHS the responsibility of providing these health services, but at the time they did not have enough physicians to conduct safe and proper procedures. After raising the pay for physicians' wages, safety improved, and they began to provide birth control treatment which ultimately led to the practice of sterilization.

== Investigation into the practice ==
While the practice went on for many decades before it was well known to the public, movements in the 1970s began to emerge and shine a light onto the issue. These protests and investigations lit a spark into the widespread reveal of the malpractice of sterilization without proper informed consent. While it was difficult to prove instances such as coercion or deception, many Native American women, doctors, or publications put forth a large effort to reveal the abuse by speaking out against the IHS. South Dakota Senator James Abourezk, called an investigation into this issue. Some notable voices came from that of Dr. Connie Uri during this investigation with the 1976 General Accounting Office (GAO). Although no information was confirmed about the sterilization abuse, this investigation brought a revision of the requirements and found weaknesses in the regulation. Some weaknesses were found involving sterilization and patients under the age of 21. There was very little regard to the discussion of consent versus non-consent, and the discussion of abuse or coercion was largely overlooked.

== Motivation for the practice ==
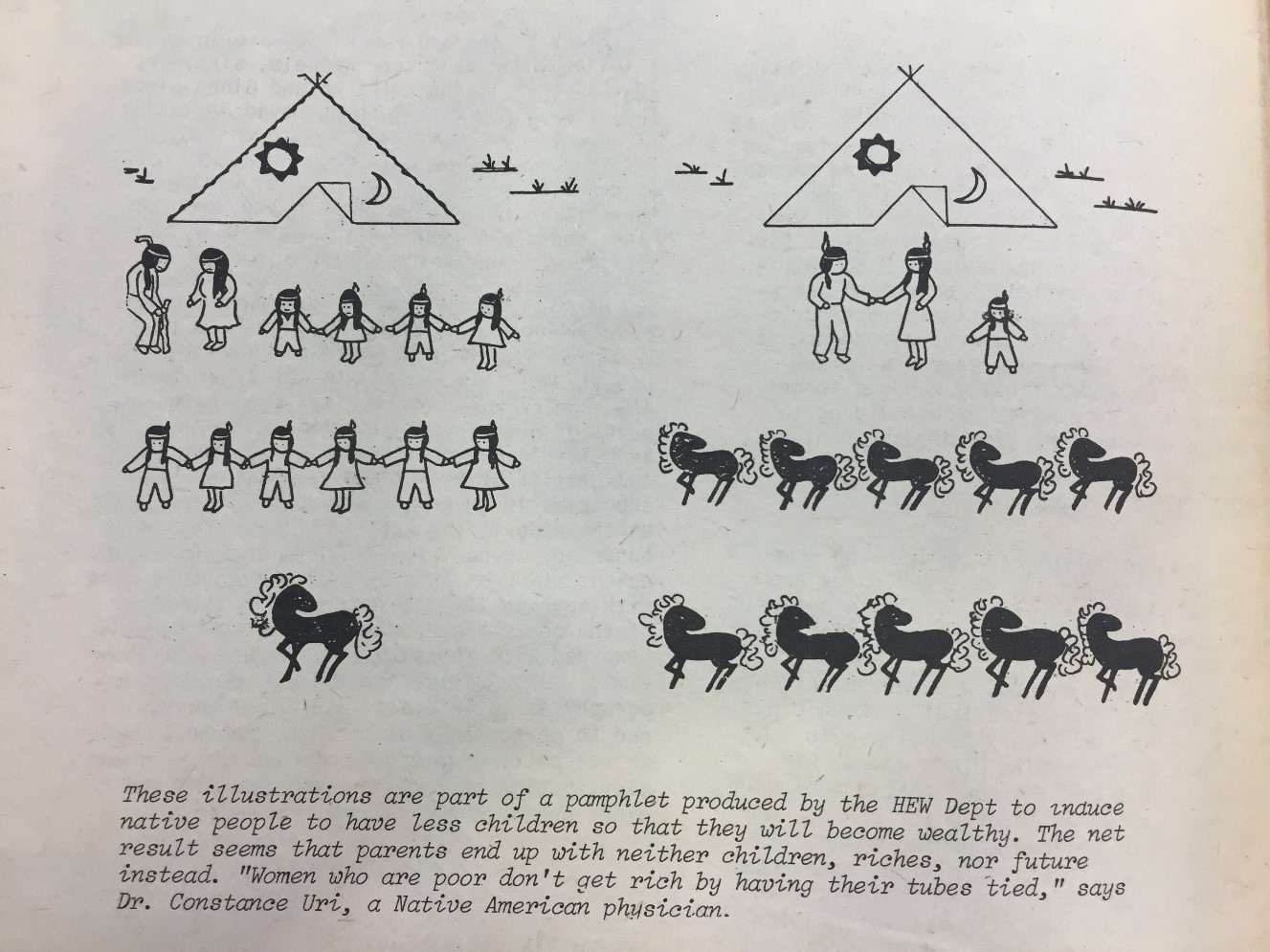
This was a pamphlet created by the Department of Health, Education, and Welfare (HEW) to urge Native American women to have fewer children. The left shows how the parents would be before adopting promoted family planning practices (tired and with little resources) and afterwards (happy and wealthy).

Native American women were not the only individuals to be subjected to forced sterilizations; black and poor women were also affected by these practices. In the 1970s, after being forced onto reservations by the United States government, or relocated into urban areas without adequate support, many Native Americans were struggling with poverty. Native American people depended on government organizations like the IHS, Department of Health, Education and Welfare (HEW) and the Bureau of Indian Affairs (BIA). The Indian Health Service (IHS) was their main health provider. Because Native Americans were dependent on these government organizations for health services, they were more at risk for forced sterilization than other groups.

Preceding the Population Research Act of 1970, overpopulation was a matter of national public concern. In a 1969 message to Congress, President Nixon claimed that overpopulation would be "one of the most serious challenges to human destiny in the last third of this century." In response to these concerns, Congress passed this act designed to address two goals: establishing a federal Office of Population Affairs and making voluntary family planning services available to the people. Six years after its passing, it is estimated that physicians sterilized perhaps 25% of Native American women of childbearing age. Evidence suggests that the numbers were higher. These high numbers could be linked to the law subsidizing sterilizations for patients who utilized Indian Health Service and Medicaid patients.

Most of the physicians performing this procedure viewed sterilization as the best alternative for these women. They claimed it would improve their financial situation and their family's quality of life. Many of these physicians believed that Native American women were not intelligent enough to use other methods of birth control, wrote Jane Lawrence in American Indian Quarterly. Thus, sterilizing these patients was seen as the most reliable birth control method. When doctors were polled on their recommendations to patients they received in private practice, only 6% recommended sterilization, while 14% would recommend it to those on welfare. When they were asked about their attitudes regarding birth control policies, 94% said they would approve of compulsory sterilization for a mother on welfare with three or more children. With fewer people applying for Medicaid and welfare, the federal government could decrease spending on welfare programs. Poor women, the disabled, and the women of color were targeted for similar reasons. In addition, the influx of surgical procedures was seen as good training for physicians and as a practice for resident physicians.

One theory suggests that IHS doctors were underpaid and overworked and they sterilized Native American women so they would have less work in the future. The average new IHS recruit made $17,000 to $20,000 a year and worked around 60 hours per week. In 1974 the ratio of doctors to patients was dangerously low, with "only one doctor to 1,700 reservation Indians." The problems caused by a lack of doctors were exacerbated even further when a program to draft doctors into the military was terminated in 1976. This directly affected the IHS because they recruited many of their doctors from the military. Between 1971 and 1974 applications for vacant IHS positions went from 700 to 100 applications, meaning that the burden of additional work fell on an ever decreasing number of doctors.

One important distinction is between doctors who worked for the IHS directly and other doctors who performed sterilizations through a contractual arrangement with the IHS. For IHS doctors, there was no financial incentive to perform sterilizations, and therefore other considerations likely played the primary role. Doctors under contract were paid more when they sterilized women instead of giving them oral contraceptives, making a financial incentive more plausible. Even though there was no financial incentive for the IHS doctors to recommend sterilization, as previously discussed, sterilization was seen as the ideal form of contraception for Native American patients during the 1960s and 1970s. IHS doctors had mostly Protestant and middle-class views of family planning, with an emphasis on a nuclear family containing a small number of children. The presumption that Native American women desired the same family structure as middle class white Americans helped make sterilization abuse possible.

== Types of sterilization ==
Hysterectomies and tubal ligation were the two main sterilization methods used. A hysterectomy is a procedure used to sterilize women where the uterus is removed through the women's abdomen or vagina. This operation was routinely used to sterilize Native American women during the 1960s and 1970s in the United States. Another common form of sterilization was tubal ligation, a sterilization procedure in which a woman's fallopian tubes are tied, blocked, or cut. For many women these procedures were done without consent, resulting in some approaching doctors for procedures like "womb transplants". In 1971, Dr. James Ryan stated that he favored hysterectomies over tubal ligations because "it's more of a challenge... and it's [a] good experience for the junior resident". This is suggestive of the attitude IHS doctors had towards their patients, as hysterectomies have a much greater rate of complications.

Some forms of birth control other than sterilization were sometimes used, including Depo-Provera and Norplant. Both of these are female contraceptives. The former entails receiving a shot every three months, whereas the latter, a form that is no longer used in the U.S., required the implantation of hormone-filled capsules beneath the skin. Depo-Provera was used on intellectually disabled Native American women before it gained clearance from the FDA in 1992. Norplant, promoted by the IHS, was marketed by Wyeth Pharmaceuticals (who were sued over insufficient disclosure of side effects including irregular menstrual bleeding, headaches, nausea and depression). Side effects of these two forms of birth control included the cessation of the menstrual cycle and excessive bleeding.

Using 2002 data from the National Survey of Family Growth, the Urban Indian Health Institute found that among women using contraception, the most common methods used by urban American Indian and Alaskan Native women age 15–44 years were female sterilization (34%), oral contraceptive pills (21%), and male condoms (21%). However, among the urban Non-Hispanic Whites, the most common methods were oral contraceptive pills (36%), female sterilization (20%) and male condoms (18%).

Today, although the Indian Health Service continues to use sterilization as a method of family planning, tubal ligation and vasectomy, which is a male sterilization procedure, are the only procedures which may be performed for the primary purpose of sterilization. Today legally, the IHS requires the patient to give informed consent to the operation, be 21 years of age or older, and not be institutionalized in a correctional or mental health facility.

== Effects of sterilization ==
A direct effect of sterilization of Native American women was that the Native American birth rate decreased. In 1970, the average birth rate of Native American women was 3.29, but it declined to 1.30 in 1980. The birthrate of Apache women fell from 4.01 to 1.78. In comparison, the average white woman birth rate fell from 2.42 to 2.14. By some counts, at least 25% of Native American women between the ages of 15 and 44 were sterilized during the most intensive period. Native women lost economic and political power by not being able to reproduce at the same rate as their white counterparts. One potential effect of this is the increased risk of extinction of Native American cultures.

The decline in birth rate was a quantifiable effect. But sterilization impacted many Native American women in non-quantifiable ways as well. Within Native American culture a woman's fertility is greatly valued, leading to psychological and social consequences from sterilization. For a woman to be unable to bear children would cause shame, embarrassment and possible condemnation from the individual's tribe due to how Native American peoples view motherhood. In 1977, lawyer Michael Zavalla filed a case with Washington State after three Cheyenne women from Montana were sterilized without their consent. However, the sterilized women remained anonymous because they feared tribal repercussions. As Marie Sanchez, Chief tribal judge for the Northern Cheyenne Reservation, explained, "even more discouraging than high legal bills is the risk of losing one's place in the Indian community, where sterilization has particular religious resonance." In some areas, the sterilization procedure was insufficiently sterile, which led to complications. When complications arose, additional medical treatment was required, but government funding only covered the procedure itself. Because most women could not afford follow-up medical care, in many cases they did not receive it, and some died as a result. Marie Sanchez equated the mass sterilization of Native Americans to genocide.

Native American women and men do not fully trust the U.S. government due to forced sterilization, and remain skeptical of contraceptive technologies.

== See also ==
- Abortion in the United States
- Black genocide in the United States
- Compulsory sterilization#United States
- Compulsory sterilization in Canada
- Eugenics in the United States
- Genocide of indigenous peoples
- Native American feminism
- Population history of the Indigenous peoples of the Americas
- Race and health in the United States
- Sexual victimization of Native American women
- Sterilization law in the United States
- Title X
- Spiral case (forced birth control in Greenland)

== Works cited ==
- Lawrence, Jane (2000). "The Indian Health Service and the Sterilization of Native American Women". American Indian Quarterly. 24 (3). University of Nebraska Press: 400–419. doi:10.1353/aiq.2000.0008. ISSN 0095-182X. JSTOR 1185911. PMID 17089462. S2CID 45253992.
