= Senator Woodson =

Senator Woodson may refer to:

- J. Belmont Woodson (1872–1963), Virginia State Senate
- Jamie Woodson (born 1972), Tennessee State Senate
