= Senator Massie =

Senator Massie may refer to:

- Bland Massie (1854–1924), Virginia State Senate
- Mike Massie (born 1954), Wyoming State Senate
- Nathaniel Massie (1763–1813), Ohio State Senate

== See also ==
- Senator Massey (disambiguation)
- Senator Mazzei (disambiguation)
