= Shepperson =

Shepperson is a surname. Notable people with the surname include:

- Lisa Shepperson (born 1975), Republican member of the Wyoming House of Representatives, representing the 58th district since 2007
- Sir Ernest Shepperson, 1st Baronet (1874–1949), Conservative Party politician in the United Kingdom
- Alec Shepperson (born 1936), English amateur golfer
- Carrie Still Shepperson (1869–1927), American educator
- George "Sam" Shepperson, English Africanist and historian
- Claude Allin Shepperson, (1867–1921) a British artist and illustrator
- John D. Shepperson, (1851–1921) an American politician
