= Carrie Buck =

American Supreme Court case plaintiff

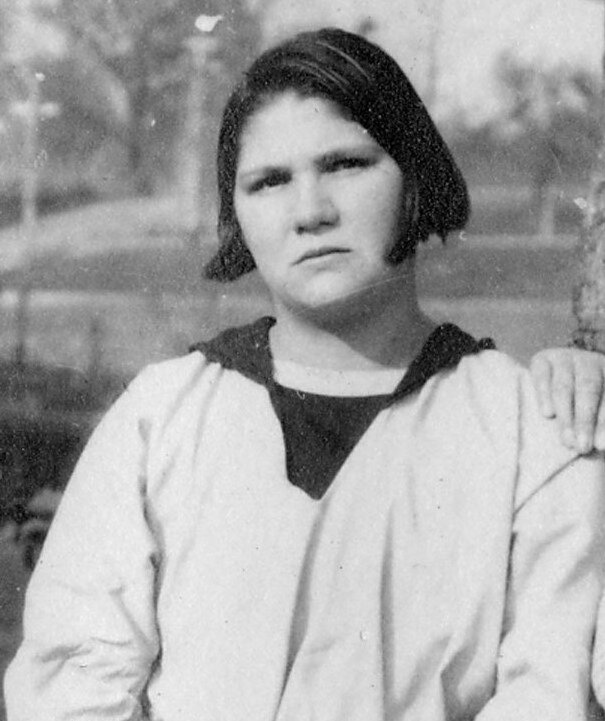
- Carrie Buck at the Virginia State Colony for Epileptics and Feebleminded in November 1924, prior to the Buck v. Bell trial
- Born: Carrie Elizabeth Buck; July 2, 1906; Charlottesville, Virginia, U.S.
- Died: January 28, 1983 (aged 76); Waynesboro, Virginia, U.S.
- Resting place: Oakwood Cemetery, Charlottesville, Virginia
- Spouses: William Eagle (m. 1932; died 1941) Charles Albert "Charlie" Detamore (m. 1965)
- Children: Vivian Dobbs (1924–1932)

Carrie Elizabeth Buck (July 2, 1906 – January 28, 1983) was the plaintiff in the United States Supreme Court case Buck v. Bell, after having been ordered to undergo compulsory sterilization for purportedly being "feeble-minded" by her foster parents after their nephew raped and impregnated her. She had given birth to an illegitimate child without the means to support it. The surgery, carried out while Buck was an inmate of the Virginia State Colony for Epileptics and Feebleminded, took place under the authority of the Sterilization Act of 1924, part of the Commonwealth of Virginia's eugenics program.

== Early life ==
Carrie Buck was born in Charlottesville, Virginia, the first of three children born to Emma Buck; she also had a half-sister, Doris Buck, and a half-brother, Roy Smith. Little is known about Emma Buck except that she was poor and married to Frederick Buck, who abandoned her early in their marriage. Emma was committed to the Virginia State Colony for Epileptics and Feebleminded after being accused of "immorality", prostitution, and having syphilis.

After her birth, Carrie Buck was placed with foster parents, John and Alice Dobbs. She attended public school, where she was noted to be an average student. When she was in sixth grade, the Dobbses removed her to have her help with housework.

At 17, Buck became pregnant as a result of being raped by Alice Dobbs' nephew, Clarence Garland. On January 23, 1924, the Dobbses had her committed to the Virginia Colony for Epileptics and Feeble-Minded on the grounds of feeblemindedness, incorrigible behavior, and promiscuity. Her commitment is said to have been due to the family's embarrassment at Buck's pregnancy from the rape incident.

On March 28, 1924, she gave birth to a daughter. Since Buck had been declared mentally incompetent to raise her child, the Dobbses adopted the baby and named her "Vivian Alice Elaine Dobbs". She attended Venable Public Elementary School of Charlottesville for four terms, from September 1930 until May 1932. By all accounts, Vivian was of average intelligence, far above feeblemindedness.

She was a perfectly normal, quite average student, neither particularly outstanding nor much troubled. In those days before grade inflation, when C meant "good, 81–87" (as defined on her report card) rather than barely scraping by, Vivian Dobbs received A's and B's for deportment and C's for all academic subjects but mathematics (which was always difficult for her, and where she scored a D) during her first term in Grade 1A, from September 1930 to January 1931. She improved during her second term in 1B, meriting an A in deportment, C in mathematics, and B in all other academic subjects; she was placed on the honor roll in April 1931. Promoted to 2A, she had trouble during the fall term of 1931, failing mathematics and spelling but receiving A in deportment, B in reading, and C in writing and English. She was "retained in 2A" for the next term – or "left back" as we used to say, and scarcely a sign of imbecility as I remember all my buddies who suffered a similar fate. In any case, she again did well in her final term, with B in deportment, reading, and spelling, and C in writing, English, and mathematics during her last month in school. This daughter of "lewd and immoral" women excelled in deportment and performed adequately, although not brilliantly, in her academic subjects.

— Stephen Jay Gould, Natural History magazine (1984), as reprinted in Gould, Stephen Jay, The Flamingo's Smile: Reflections in Natural History, New York: W.W. Norton & Co., 1985, pp. 316–317.

In June 1932, Vivian contracted measles. She died from a secondary intestinal infection, enteric colitis, at the age of 8.

== Supreme Court case ==
Virginia's General Assembly passed the Eugenical Sterilization Act in 1924. According to American historian Paul A. Lombardo, politicians wrote the law to benefit a malpracticing doctor avoiding lawsuits from patients who had been the victims of forced sterilization. Eugenicists used Buck to legitimize this law in the 1927 Supreme Court case Buck v. Bell through which they sought to gain legal permission for Virginia to sterilize Buck.

Irving P. Whitehead, a known eugenicist, served as Buck's attorney. He was a close confidante of A. S. Priddy, the superintendent of Virginia Colony at the start of the trial, and a childhood friend of Aubrey E. Strode, who drafted the 1924 Eugenical Sterilization Act. Whitehead failed to adequately defend Buck and counteract the prosecutors. Thus, his case did not convince the Supreme Court to vote in favor of Buck. The cross examination and witnesses produced by Whitehead were ineffectual, and allegedly a result of his alliance with Strode during the trial. Additionally, Whitehead was also familiar with the sterilization law's drafters. There was no real litigation between the prosecution and the defense, and thus the Supreme Court did not receive sufficient evidence to make a fair decision on the "friendly [law]suit."

The legal challenge was consciously collusive, brought on behalf of the state to test the legality of the statute. John H. Bell, the surgeon who operated on Buck on October 19, 1927, wrote in his surgical report:

This is the first case operated on under the sterilization law, and the case was carried through the courts of the State and the United States Supreme Court to test the constitutionality of the Virginia act, and an appeal before the Supreme Court for a rehearing recently having been denied.

In an eight-to-one decision, the U.S. Supreme Court found that the Virginia Sterilization Act of 1924 did not violate the U.S. Constitution. Justice Oliver Wendell Holmes made clear that the challenge was not upon the medical procedure involved, but on the process of the substantive law. The court was satisfied that the Virginia Sterilization Act complied with the requirements of due process, since sterilization could not occur until a proper hearing had occurred, at which the patient and a guardian could be present, and the patient had the right to appeal the decision. They also found that, since the procedure was limited to people housed in state institutions, it did not deny the patient equal protection of the law. And finally, since the Virginia Sterilization Act was not a penal statute, the Court held that it did not violate the Eighth Amendment, since it is not intended to be punitive. Citing the best interests of the state, Justice Holmes affirmed the value of a law like Virginia's in order to prevent the nation from being "swamped with incompetence." The Court accepted without evidence that Carrie and her mother were promiscuous, and that the three generations of Bucks shared the genetic trait of feeblemindedness. Thus, it was in the state's best interest to have Carrie Buck sterilized. The decision was seen as a major victory for eugenicists.

We have seen more than once that the public welfare may call upon the best citizens for their lives. It would be strange if it could not call upon those who already sap the strength of the State for these lesser sacrifices, often not felt to be such by those concerned, in order to prevent our being swamped with incompetence. It is better for all the world, if instead of waiting to execute degenerate offspring for crime, or to let them starve for their imbecility, society can prevent those who are manifestly unfit from continuing their kind. The principle that sustains compulsory vaccination is broad enough to cover cutting the Fallopian tubes. [...] Three generations of imbeciles are enough.

— Justice Oliver Wendell Holmes, Buck v. Bell, 274 U.S. 200 (1927)

The 1927 Supreme Court opinion states that Carrie Buck is the likely parent of "socially inadequate offspring[s]" which is a euphemism for illegitimate children.

Noted Virginia eugenicist Joseph DeJarnette testified against Buck in the original trial.

According to famed eugenicist Harry H. Laughlin, whose written testimony was presented during the trial in his absence, Buck's legal defeat signaled the end of "eugenical sterilization's 'experimental period.'" Following the Supreme Court ruling, over two dozen states enacted similar laws, including Oregon and the Carolinas, doubling American sterilizations from 6,000 to more than 12,000 by 1947. Buck was sterilized on October 19, 1927, roughly five months after the Supreme Court trial verdict. She became the first Virginian sterilized since the 1924 Eugenical Sterilization Act passed. The Virginia sterilization law is said to have inspired Nazi Germany's 400,000 sterilizations, including those sanctioned under the 1933 Law for Protection Against Genetically Defective Offspring.

== Later years and death ==
In order to ensure that the Buck family could not reproduce, her sister Doris was also sterilized without consent when she was hospitalized for appendicitis. She later married and she and her husband attempted to have children; she did not discover the reason for their lack of success until 1980.

Buck was released shortly after her sterilization was performed. On May 14, 1932, at the age of 25, she married William D. Eagle, a 65-year-old widower with six children from his first marriage; he died in 1941. In 1965, she married 61-year-old orchard worker Charlie Detamore; the marriage lasted until her death. Reporters and researchers who visited Buck later in life claimed she was a woman of normal intelligence. Later in life, she expressed regret that she had been unable to have additional children.

Buck died in a nursing home in 1983. She was buried in Charlottesville near her only child, Vivian, who had died at age eight.

== Legacy ==
Paul A. Lombardo, a professor of law at Georgia State University, spent almost 25 years researching the Buck v. Bell case. He searched through case records and the papers of the lawyers involved in the case. Lombardo eventually found Carrie Buck and was able to interview her shortly before her death. Lombardo has alleged that several people had manufactured evidence to make the state's case against Carrie Buck, and that Buck was actually of normal intelligence. Lombardo was one of the few people who attended Carrie Buck's funeral.

A historical marker was erected on May 2, 2002, in Charlottesville, Virginia, where Carrie Buck was born. At that time, Virginia Governor Mark R. Warner offered the "Commonwealth's sincere apology for Virginia's forced participation in eugenics."

=== In media ===
The story of Carrie Buck's sterilization and subsequent court case was made into a television drama in 1994, Against Her Will: The Carrie Buck Story with actress Marlee Matlin portraying Buck as an intellectually disabled woman. A feature film has been announced, titled Unfit and starring actress Dakota Johnson. Buck's case was covered in the October 2018 American Experience documentary "The Eugenics Crusade".

The song "Virginia State Epileptic Colony", by Manic Street Preachers on the 2009 album Journal for Plague Lovers, addresses the state's program of eugenics. Carrie Buck's story is explored in Adam Cohen's book Imbeciles.

== See also ==
- The Relf Sisters, two African American sisters who were involuntarily sterilized in Montgomery, Alabama in 1973
