= Virginia Sterilization Act of 1924 =

1924 U.S. state law allowing compulsory sterilization for eugenic purposes

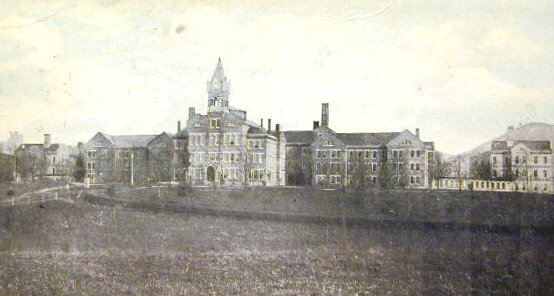
Southwestern Lunatic Asylum in Marion, Virginia. Renamed Southwestern State Hospital and finally renamed the Southwestern Virginia Mental Health Institute. Built May 17, 1887.

The Virginia Sterilization Act of 1924 was a U.S. state law in Virginia for the sterilization of institutionalized persons "afflicted with hereditary forms of insanity that are recurrent, idiocy, imbecility, feeble-mindedness or epilepsy”. It greatly influenced the development of eugenics in the twentieth century. The act was based on model legislation written by Harry H. Laughlin and challenged by a case that led to the United States Supreme Court decision of Buck v. Bell. The Supreme Court upheld the law as constitutional and it became a model law for sterilization laws in other states. Justice Holmes wrote that a patient may be sterilized "on complying with the very careful provisions by which the act protects the patients from possible abuse." Between 1924 and 1979, Virginia sterilized over 7,000 individuals under the act. The act was never declared unconstitutional; however, the Virginia General Assembly repealed it in 1974, ended all sterilizations in 1979 and passed a joint resolution apologizing for the misuse of "a respectable, 'scientific' veneer to cover activities of those who held blatantly racist views" in 2001. The Assembly also agreed to compensate individuals sterilized under the act in 2015.

== Historical background ==
=== Laughlin's Model Eugenical Sterilization Law ===
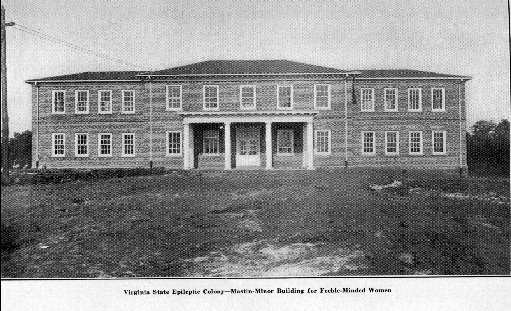
First opened in 1910 as the Virginia State Epileptic Colony

During the early 20th century, Harry H. Laughlin, director of the Eugenics Record Office at Cold Spring Harbor, New York, became concerned that states were not enforcing their eugenics laws. In 1922, he published his book, Eugenical Sterilization in the United States, which included a "MODEL EUGENICAL STERILIZATION LAW" in Chapter XV.

By 1924, 15 states had enacted similar legislation; however, unlike Virginia, many or most or all of those states failed to rigidly enforce their laws requiring specific qualities in all persons seeking to marry. Forced sterilization, however, was much more common. By 1956, twenty-four states had laws providing for involuntary sterilization on their books. These states collectively reported having forcibly sterilized 59,000 people over the preceding 50 years.

Virginia implemented Laughlin's "Model Eugenical Sterilization Law" with little modification two years after it was published.

== Text from the 1924 Act ==
An emergency existing, this act shall be enforced from its passage.
Chap. 394. - An ACT to provide for the sexual sterilization of inmates of State institutions in certain cases. [S B 281]

Approved March 20, 1924.

Whereas, both the health of the individual patient and the welfare of society may be promoted in certain cases by the sterilization of mental defectives under careful safeguard and by competent and conscientious authority, and

Whereas, such sterilization may be effected in males by the operation of vasectomy and in females by the operation of salpingectomy, both of which said operations may be performed without serious pain or substantial danger to the life of the patient, and

Whereas, the Commonwealth has in custodial care and is supporting in various State institutions many defective persons who if now discharged or paroled would likely become by the propagation of their kind a menace to society but who if incapable of procreating might properly and safely be discharged or paroled and become self-supporting with benefit both to themselves and to society, and

Whereas, human experience has demonstrated that heredity plays an important part in the transmission of sanity, idiocy, imbecility, epilepsy and crime, now, therefore

1. Be it enacted by the general assembly of Virginia, That whenever the superintendent of the Western State Hospital, or of the Eastern State Hospital, or of the Southwestern State Hospital, or of the Central State Hospital, or the State Colony for Epileptics and Feeble-Minded, shall be of opinion that it is for the best interests of the patients and of society that any inmate of the institution under his care should be sexually sterilized, such superintendent is hereby authorized to perform, or cause to be performed by some capable physicians or surgeon, the operation of sterilization on any such patient confined in such institution afflicted with hereditary forms of insanity that are recurrent, idiocy, imbecility, feeble-mindedness or epilepsy; provided that such superintendent shall have first complied with the requirements of this act.

2. Such superintendent shall first present to the special board of directors of his hospital or colony a petition stating the facts of the case and the grounds of his opinion, verified by his affidavit to the best of his knowledge and belief, and praying that an order may be entered by said board requiring him to perform or have performed by some competent physician to be designated by him in his said petition or by said board in its order, upon the inmate of his institution named in such petition, the operation of vasectomy if upon a male and of salpingectomy if upon a female.

A copy of said petition must be served upon the inmate together with a notice in writing designating the time and place in the said institution, not less than thirty days before the presentation of such petition to said special board of directors when and where said board may hear and act upon such petition

— Virginia General Assembly, March 20, 1924

== Groups targeted ==
The intention to control or reduce ethnic minorities, especially Negroes, can be seen in writings by some leaders in the eugenics movement:

In an 1893 "open letter" published in the Virginia Medical Monthly, Hunter Holmes McGuire, a Richmond physician and president of the American Medical Association, asked for "some scientific explanation of the sexual perversion in the Negro of the present day." McGuire's correspondent, Chicago physician G. Frank Lydston, replied that African-American men raped white women because of "[h]ereditary influences descending from the uncivilized ancestors of our Negroes." Lydston suggested as a solution to perform surgical castration, which "prevents the criminal from perpetuating his kind.

Despite lacking the statutory authority to sterilize black, mulatto, and American Indian children simply because they were "colored", a small number of Virginia eugenicists in key positions found other ways to achieve that goal. The Sterilization Act gave State institutions, including hospitals, psychiatric institutions and prisons, the statutory authority to sterilize persons deemed to be "feebleminded" — a highly subjective criterion.

Joseph DeJarnette, director of the Western State Hospital in Staunton, Virginia, was a leading advocate of eugenics. DeJarnette was unsatisfied with the pace of America's eugenics sterilization programs. In 1938, he wrote:

Germany in six years has sterilized about 80,000 of her unfit while the United States — with approximately twice the population — has only sterilized about 27,869 in the past 20 years. ... The fact that there are 12,000,000 defectives in the US should arouse our best endeavors to push this procedure to the maximum ... The Germans are beating us at our own game.

By "12 million defectives" (a tenth of the population), DeJarnette was almost certainly referring to ethnic minorities, as there have never been 12 million mental patients in the United States.

According to historian Gregory M. Dorr, the University of Virginia School of Medicine (UVA) became "an epicenter of eugenical thought" that was "closely linked with the national movement." One of UVA's leading eugenicists, Harvey Ernest Jordan, PhD was promoted to dean of medicine in 1939 and served until 1949. He was in a position to shape the opinion and practice of Virginia physicians for several decades. This excerpt from a 1934 UVA student paper indicates one student's thoughts: "In Germany, Hitler has decreed that about 400,000 persons be sterilized. This is a great step in eliminating the racial deficients."

The racial effects of the program in Virginia can be seen by the disproportionately high number of black and American Indian women who were given forced sterilizations after coming to a hospital for other reasons, such as childbirth. Doctors sometimes sterilized the women without their knowledge or consent in the course of other surgery.

== Repeal and Sterilization law after 1988 ==
After sterilizations peaked in the 1930s and 1940s, the popularity of eugenic sterilizations declined due to scientific misconduct in eugenics and Nazis' association with eugenics. In the 1960s, eugenic sterilizations saw a further decline because of a wave of deinstitutionalisation and changing attitudes about autonomy and sexuality. In 1972, the Virginia State Board of Mental Health banned eugenic sterilization. In 1974, the Virginia General Assembly repealed the Virginia Sterilization Act of 1924. In 1979, General Assembly repealed all remaining references to sterilization from the Virginia Code. A small number of therapeutic sterilizations continued at the Lynchburg Training School between 1974 and 1979.

In 1988, a new sterilization law passed and as amended in 2013, provides the procedural requirements necessary for a physician to lawfully sterilize a patient capable of giving informed consent and incapable of giving informed consent. A physician may perform a sterilization procedure on a patient if the patient is capable of giving informed consent, the patient consents to the procedure in writing, and the physician explains the consequences of the procedure and alternative methods of contraception. A court may authorize a physician to perform a sterilization on a mentally incompetent adult or child after the procedural requirements are met and the court finds with clear and convincing evidence the patient is or is likely to engage sexual activity, no other contraceptive is reasonably available, the patient's mental disability renders the patient permanently unable to care for a child, and the procedure conforms with medical standards.

== Apology and compensation ==
=== Legislative history ===
In February 2001, the Virginia General Assembly passed a joint resolution, introduced by Mitchell Van Yahres, expressing regret for Virginia's experience with eugenics. In the 2002 session, Van Yahres introduced a joint resolution honoring the memory of Carrie Buck. This joint resolution was passed by the House and Senate in February 2002. In the same year, Bob Marshall, introduced a joint resolution referencing the 2001 eugenics resolution and calling for the establishment of a subcommittee to study issues related to stem cell research; however, this resolution did not pass the Rules committee. In 2013 and 2014, Marshall introduced the Justice for Victims of Sterilization Act to give compensation for up to $50,000 per person; however, the bill did not get past the Appropriations committee in either year. In 2015, Patrick A. Hope reintroduced the Justice for Victims of Sterilization Act, and although the Act did not get past the Appropriations committee, an amendment was added to the budget bill to give compensation of up to $25,000 per person who was "involuntarily sterilized pursuant to the Virginia Eugenical Sterilization Act."

=== Eligibility for compensation ===
The legislature authorized compensation of up to $25,000 per claim to provide compensation for individuals sterilized "pursuant to the Virginia Eugenical Sterilization Act and who were living as of February 1, 2015." If the person died on or after February 1, 2015, a claim may be submitted by the estate or personal representative of the person who died.

== See also ==
- Racial Integrity Act of 1924
- Poe v. Lynchburg Training School & Hospital
- Law for the Prevention of Hereditarily Diseased Offspring
