= Senator Mazzei =

Senator Mazzei may refer to:

- Frank Mazzei (1912–1977), Pennsylvania State Senate
- Mike Mazzei (born 1965), Oklahoma State Senate

== See also ==
- Senator Massie (disambiguation)
- Senator Massey (disambiguation)
