= Paul A. Lombardo =

American legal historian

Paul A. Lombardo is an American legal historian known for his work on the legacy of eugenics and sterilization in the United States. Lombardo’s foundational research corrected the historical record of the 1927 U.S. Supreme Court case of Buck v. Bell. He found Carrie Buck’s school grades and the grades of her child Vivian. He was the last person to interview her, and he discovered the pictures of all three generations of the Buck family. In 2002, he sponsored and paid for a memorial plaque that was installed in Buck’s hometown of Charlottesville, Virginia.

== Education ==
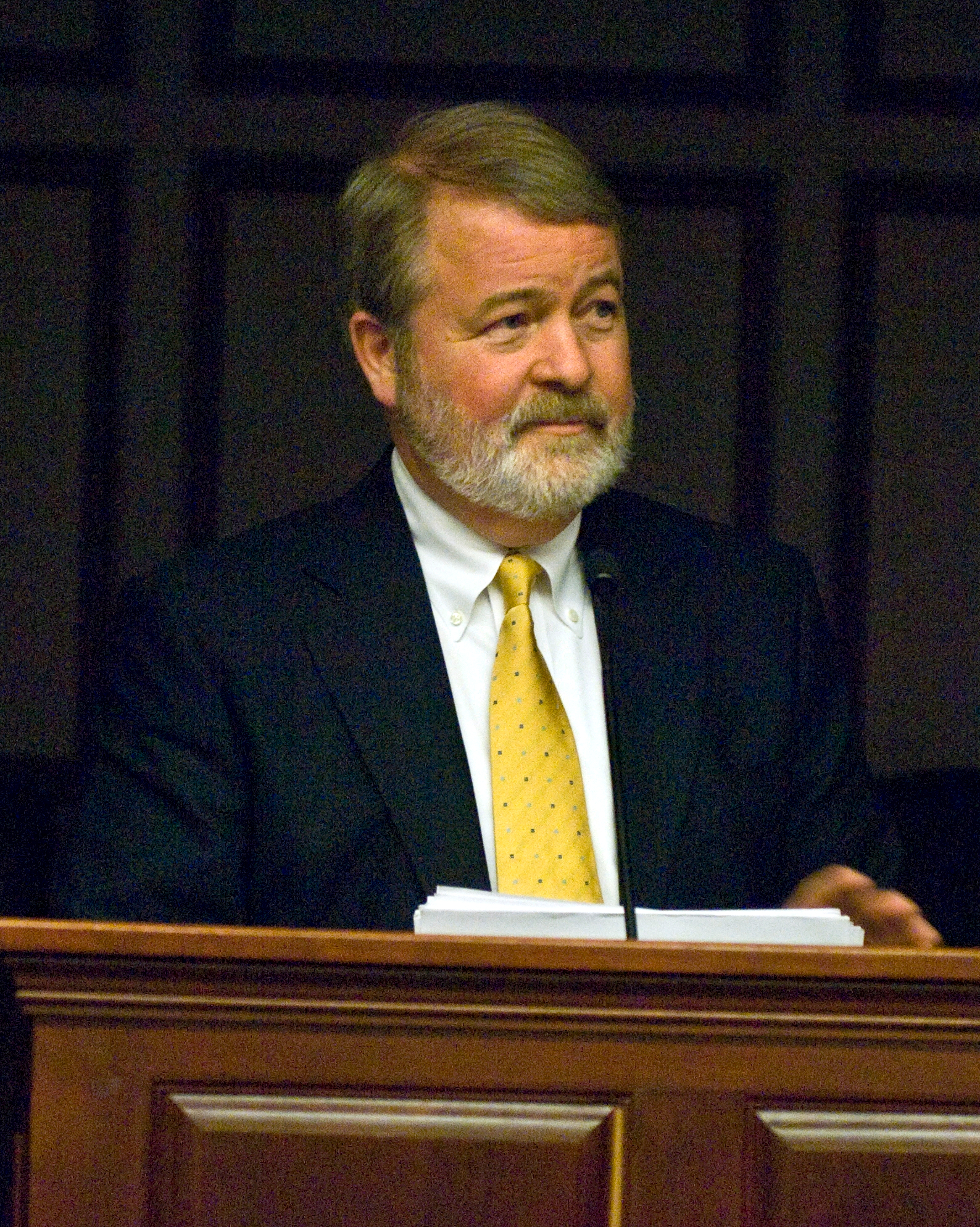
Professor Lombardo in 2011

Lombardo received his A.B. from Rockhurst College (Kansas City, Mo.), his M.A. from Loyola University of Chicago and both his Ph.D. and J.D. from the University of Virginia.

== Career ==
He joined the faculty at Georgia State University College of Law in 2006, where he is currently a Regents Professor Emeritus and the Bobby Lee Cook Professor of Law Emeritus.

He is coeditor of Fletcher's Clinical Ethics, 3rd edition (2005). His book Three Generations, No Imbeciles: Eugenics, the Supreme Court and Buck v. Bell (2008) was recognized at the 2009 Library of Virginia Literary Awards; it also earned him designation as a 2009 Georgia Author of the Year. It has just been reissued in a new, updated edition (2022). Lombardo also published an edited volume: A Century of Eugenics in America: From the Indiana Experiment to the Human Genome Era (2010). In 2024, Lombardo published an assessment of the New England Journal of Medicine's own historical coverage of eugenics.

Lombardo is an elected member of the American Law Institute, a Fellow of the American Bar Foundation, and has been a consultant for the institutes of the National Institutes of Health. He served as a committee member for the Institute of Medicine as well as the National Human Research Protection Advisory Committee.

From 2011 to 2016, Lombardo served as a senior advisor to the Presidential Commission for the Study of Bioethical Issues. He worked on three Commission reports: Ethically Impossible: STD Research in Guatemala: 1946-1948 (2011), Moral Science: Protecting Participants in Human Subjects Research (2012) and Privacy and Progress in Whole Genome Sequencing (2012).

He testified as an expert witness in Lowe v. Atlas, a landmark federal genetic discrimination case, and his work was cited in a U.S. Supreme Court opinion, (Kristina Box, Commissioner, Indiana Department of Health, et al. v. Planned Parenthood of Indiana and Kentucky, Inc., et al (587 U. S. ____ (2019)).

In 2021 he received the Jay Healey Health Law Professor of the Year, from the American Society of Law, Medicine, & Ethics, and in 2019 he was named a Fulbright Specialist.

In 2023, Lombardo was named Distinguished Professor of Bioethics and Law, by the Sindh Institute of Medical Sciences in Karachi, Pakistan, for his contribution to teaching there over the past two decades and recognized as a Hastings Center Fellow, “a group of more than 200 individuals of outstanding accomplishment whose work has informed scholarship and public understanding of complex ethical issues in health, health care, science, and technology.”

He was named to the Faculty Scholars Program Committee of the Greenwall Foundation in 2026.

He has lectured in England, Austria, Italy, Russia, Pakistan and Canada, and at dozens of colleges and universities in the U.S. He is regularly contacted as an expert by the media; recent interviews appeared on the BBC, USA Today, New York Times, Los Angeles Times, San Francisco Chronicle, Washington Post, National Public Radio, the CBS Evening News, and Anderson Cooper 360.

Lombardo consulted for several films, including Belly of the Beast (2020), The Lynchburg Story (1993), Race: the Power of an Illusion Part I, The Difference Between Us (2003) and The Golden Door (2006). He was a featured commentator and historical consultant on the PBS program American Experience (“The Eugenics Crusade,” 2018,) NPR's Hidden Brain (“Emma, Carrie, Vivian: How A Family Became A Test Case For Forced Sterilizations,” 2018), and WNYC's RadioLab ("G: Unfit," 2019).
