= Senator Massey (disambiguation) =

William A. Massey (1856–1914) was a U.S. Senator from Nevada from 1912 to 1913.

Senator Massey may also refer to:

- A. Shane Massey (born 1975), South Carolina State Senate
- Becky Duncan Massey (born 1955), Tennessee State Senate
- Chris Massey (politician) (born 1971), Mississippi State Senate
- Zachary D. Massey (1864–1923), Tennessee State Senate

== See also ==
- Senator Massie (disambiguation)
- Senator Mazzei (disambiguation)
