= John D. Shepperson =

American politician

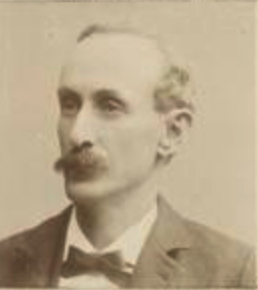

Member of the Virginia House of Delegates from Charlotte County
- In office December 4, 1889 – December 6, 1893
- Preceded by: Robert Catlett
- Succeeded by: A. S. Priddy

Personal details
- Born: John Daniel Shepperson; February 2, 1851 Charlotte, Virginia, U.S.
- Died: December 1, 1921 (aged 70) Keysville, Virginia, U.S.
- Party: Democratic
- Spouse: Mary Agnes Burton

John Daniel Shepperson (February 2, 1851 – December 1, 1921) was an American politician who served in the Virginia House of Delegates. He later worked as a postmaster for ten years.

He and his wife Mary Agnes "Mamie" Burton (died 1911) had five daughters (Mary, Lucy, Gay, Edmonia, and another) and a son (Archie). Shepperson died on December 1, 1921, in Keysville. His funeral was held the next day.
