= A. S. Priddy =

American politician and eugenicist

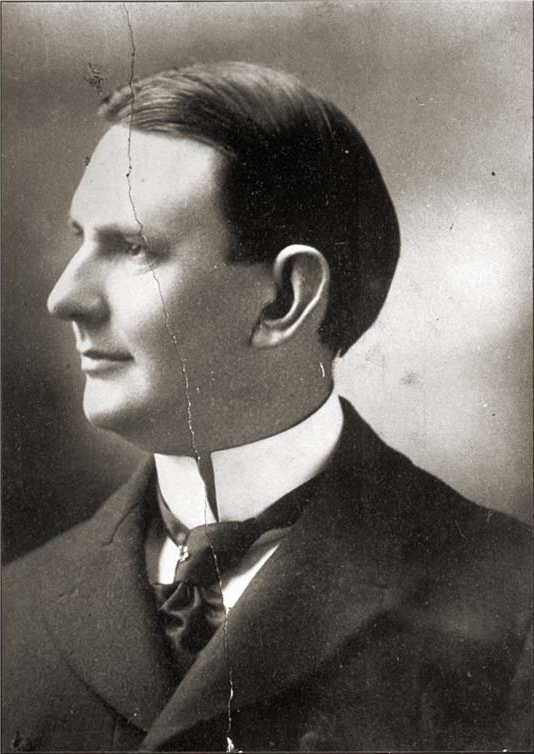

Member of the Virginia House of Delegates from Charlotte County
- In office December 6, 1899 – December 4, 1901
- Preceded by: William C. Carrington
- Succeeded by: Henry C. Rice
- In office December 6, 1893 – December 4, 1895
- Preceded by: John D. Shepperson
- Succeeded by: Henry C. Rice

Personal details
- Born: Albert Sidney Priddy; December 7, 1865 Charlotte, Virginia, U.S.
- Died: January 13, 1925 (aged 59) Lynchburg, Virginia, U.S.
- Party: Democratic
- Spouse: Mamie Hardy
- Education: College of Physicians and Surgeons, Baltimore

Albert Sidney Priddy (December 7, 1865 – January 13, 1925) was an American physician and politician. He served two non-consecutive terms as a member of the Virginia House of Delegates from Charlotte County. A proponent of eugenics and compulsory sterilization, Priddy was instrumental in the founding of the Virginia State Colony for Epileptics and Feebleminded and served as its first superintendent. It was in this capacity that he was named as defendant in the case Buck v. Priddy. The case was later renamed Buck v. Bell after his death in 1925 and made it to the Supreme Court of the United States.
