= Bland Massie =

American politician

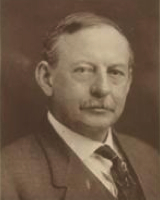

Member of the Virginia Senate from the 19th district
- In office January 10, 1912 – January 12, 1916
- Preceded by: Aubrey E. Strode
- Succeeded by: Aubrey E. Strode
- In office December 1, 1897 – January 10, 1906
- Preceded by: J. Thompson Brown
- Succeeded by: Aubrey E. Strode

Member of the Virginia House of Delegates from Nelson County
- In office December 6, 1893 – December 4, 1895
- Preceded by: Henry T. Harris
- Succeeded by: Henry T. Harris

Personal details
- Born: Bland Barksdale Massie; November 10, 1854 Tyro, Virginia, U.S.
- Died: January 8, 1924 (aged 69) Tyro, Virginia, U.S.
- Party: Democratic
- Spouse: Elizabeth Royster Snead

Bland Barksdale Massie (November 10, 1854 – January 8, 1924) was an American Democratic politician who served as a member of the Virginia Senate, representing the state's 19th district. He was born at Pharsalia in Nelson County.

Virginia House of Delegates
Preceded by Henry T. Harris	Virginia Delegate for Nelson County; 1897–1904	Succeeded by Henry T. Harris
Senate of Virginia
Preceded by J. Thompson Brown	Virginia Senator for the 19th District; 1897–1906; 1912–1916	Succeeded by Aubrey E. Strode
Preceded by Aubrey E. Strode	Virginia Senator for the 19th District; 1897–1906; 1912–1916	Succeeded by Aubrey E. Strode
