= Aubrey E. Strode =

Member of the Senate of Virginia

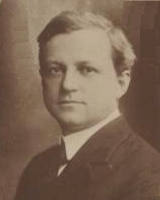

Member of the Virginia Senate from the 19th district
- In office January 12, 1916 – January 14, 1920
- Preceded by: Bland Massie
- Succeeded by: J. Belmont Woodson
- In office January 10, 1906 – January 10, 1912
- Preceded by: Bland Massie
- Succeeded by: Bland Massie

Personal details
- Born: Aubrey Ellis Strode; October 2, 1873 Amherst, Virginia, U.S.
- Died: May 17, 1946 (aged 72) Amherst, Virginia, U.S.
- Party: Democratic
- Spouses: Rebekah Davies Brown; Louisa Dexter Hubbard
- Education: University of Mississippi; University of Virginia

Military service
- Branch/service: United States Army
- Rank: Lieutenant colonel
- Unit: J.A.G. Corps
- Battles/wars: World War I

Aubrey Ellis Strode (October 2, 1873 – May 17, 1946) was an American lawyer and politician. A Democrat, he was a member of the Virginia Senate, representing the state's 19th district. He was a strong advocate for Jim Crow laws. Strode authored Virginia's sterilization law (Racial Integrity Act of 1924). Strode wrote the Virginia Law Review in 1925 for sterilization. Strode also represented the Virginia State Colony for Epileptics and Feebleminded in its court case for forced sterilizations of people identified as morons (feebleminded) based on eugenics arguments. Strode argued the test case for the forced sterilization of Carrie Buck before the U.S. Supreme Court. Buck's attorney was a friend of Strode's since childhood, Irving Whitehead, who had also served on the Colony's board.

Senate of Virginia
Preceded by Bland Massie	Virginia Senator for the 19th District; 1906–1912; 1916–1920	Succeeded by Bland Massie
Preceded by Bland Massie	Virginia Senator for the 19th District; 1906–1912; 1916–1920	Succeeded by J. Belmont Woodson
