= J. Belmont Woodson =

American politician

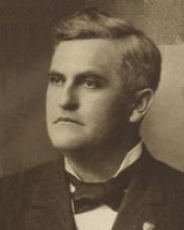

Member of the Virginia Senate
- In office January 14, 1920 – January 10, 1940
- Preceded by: Aubrey E. Strode
- Succeeded by: I. Paul Wailes
- Constituency: 19th district (1920‍–‍1924); 4th district (1924‍–‍1940)

Personal details
- Born: Julian Belmont Woodson; January 4, 1872 Lowesville, Virginia, U.S.
- Died: July 7, 1963 (aged 91) Richmond, Virginia, U.S.
- Party: Democratic
- Spouse: Rosa Lee Gilbert
- Education: Washington University in St. Louis

Julian Belmont Woodson (January 4, 1872 – July 7, 1963) was an American Democratic politician who served as a member of the Virginia Senate, representing the state's 19th district from 1920 to 1924 and its 4th district from 1924 to 1940.

Senate of Virginia
Preceded by Aubrey E. Strode	Virginia Senator for the 19th District; 1920–1924	Succeeded by John H. Crockett
Preceded by William L. Andrews	Virginia Senator for the 4th District; 1924–1940	Succeeded by I. Paul Wailes
