= Relf sisters =

African-American sisters involuntarily sterilized in 1973

Minnie Lee and Mary Alice Relf (who were 12 and 14 years old in 1973, respectively) are two African-American sisters who were involuntarily sterilized by tubal ligation by a federally funded family planning clinic in Montgomery, Alabama in 1973. News coverage of a class-action lawsuit filed by the Southern Poverty Law Center brought U.S. government-funded sterilization abuse to the national spotlight.

== Relf family background and context ==
Mary Alice and Minnie Lee are the youngest of six children born to Lonnie and Minnie Relf. The Relf family experienced poverty while living in Montgomery, Alabama. Lonnie Relf, having been injured in a car accident, was unable to work and neither he nor his wife, Minnie, were able to read or write. The family received support from the Montgomery, Alabama, Community Action Committee which, in 1971, relocated the family to live in public housing.

== Background ==
At the time of the case, in 1973, women of color were a major target of coerced sterilization in the United States. In North Carolina, 65% of sterilization operations were performed on African American women, although only 25% of its female population was black. Mary Alice and Minnie were not the only African American minors who were forcibly sterilized during the 1970s. The same family planning clinic used by the Relfs sterilized a total of 11 female minors, 10 of whom were black. This investigation led to a further discovery of many more involuntary procedures on minors across the United States. From a total of 3,260 government-funded birth control clinics, another 80 minors were found to have been coercively sterilized. One case involved Deborah Blackmon, an African American woman from North Carolina who was involuntarily sterilized at 14 years old via a total abdominal hysterectomy in January 1972 due to the court judging her to be "severely mentally retarded". Due to her undergoing the procedure under county authority, as opposed to state, Blackmon was never compensated for the procedure. A majority of these girls came from poor families. The Relf case helped expose thousands of sterilization procedures that did not involve consent, the majority of which involved African American women.

=== Involuntary sterilization of mentally disabled people ===
Eugenicists sought to improve society by discouraging reproduction in populations deemed "inferior". Those who were deemed inferior included people who were mentally disabled. A 1937 U.S. policy titled "Law 116" stated that, in the U.S. territory of Puerto Rico, those who were "feeble-minded" and "diseased" could be permanently sterilized. Lawmakers believed that these individuals were inept in making decisions about their reproductive abilities. They also did not want the mentally ill to pass on their genetic traits to their offspring. The United States used this reasoning as justification for the sterilizations previously performed as well as for future sterilization procedures. Law 116 was repealed in 1960.

== Relf sterilization case ==
The Relf sisters were involuntarily sterilized in 1973. In 1971, when Montgomery Community Action (MCA) moved the Relf family into public housing, the family planning service of MCA "began the unsolicited administration of experimental birth control injections", containing Depo-Provera, on Katie Relf, Minnie Lee and Mary Alice's older sister. In March 1973, Katie, a minor, had been taken to the family planning clinic, where she had an intrauterine device, or IUD, insertion procedure. Neither of Katie's parents was asked to give permission for Katie to receive this form of birth control, and Katie "submitted to the directions of the clinic staff that she accept implantation of the device."

In June 1973, two social workers from Montgomery Community visited the Relf residence with concerns that young boys were "hanging around" Minnie Lee and Mary Alice, who were both mentally disabled. Lonnie was not home. The MCA workers told Minnie that her daughters were going to receive some "shots." The three were transported to a hospital, where Minnie, who could neither read nor write, signed a consent form with "X." She believed that Mary Alice and Minnie Lee were going to be given hormonal contraception injections, as they had received previously. Later that day, Katie Relf, 17 years old at the time, was visited at her family home by a "nurse" seeking to have her be sterilized. Being a minor and home alone, she refused, locking herself in her room.

The following day, Lonnie went to visit his daughters at the hospital. When he arrived, he was advised that visiting hours were over and he could not see his daughters that day. Following three days in the hospital, the girls were sent home. Lonnie later noticed surgical scars on both of his youngest daughters' bodies. He asked his social worker what had actually happened. On realizing that their daughters had been sterilized without their consent, the Relfs filed a class-action lawsuit in the United States District Court for the District of Columbia with the help of the Southern Poverty Law Center. Katie Relf would also sue with her sisters in the court case of Relf v. Weinberger, which resulted in a prohibition against the use of federal funds for involuntary sterilization. The defendants in the case, Caspar Weinberger, secretary of the Department of Health, Education and Welfare (HEW) and then-director of the Office of Economic Opportunity (OEO) Alvin J. Arnett were accused in the complaint of having "used federal funds and the powers devolved upon them to bring about the use of birth control measures, including sterilization, on the plaintiffs (in the case of OEO) and the class they represent (in the case of OEO and HEW)[...]The defendants Caspar Weinberger and Arnett as well as their predecessors in office were found to have acted to deny plaintiffs and their class status the right to procreate, which is a constitutionally protected right, by failing to establish any guidelines for birth control programs conducted with federal funds, under federal auspices or by failing to distribute such guidelines once formulated."

== See also ==
- Carrie Buck (July 3, 1906 – January 28, 1983) was one of the many women forcibly sterilized because her mother and doctor diagnosed her as 'feeble-minded', a diagnosis constructed from her sexual behavior. In Buck v. Bell, the court decided to uphold a prior resolution that permitted coerced sterilization on the basis of eugenics for people considered to be genetically inferior.
- African Americans and birth control § The sterilization movement
- Compulsory sterilization
