= Poe v. Lynchburg Training School & Hospital =

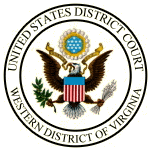
- Court: United States District Court for the Western District of Virginia
- Full case name: James Poe, et al. v. Lynchburg Training School & Hospital, et al.
- Decided: April 13, 1981
- Docket nos.: Civ. A. No. 80-0172
- Citation: 518 F. Supp. 789

Court membership
- Judge sitting: James Clinton Turk

Poe v. Lynchburg Training School & Hospital, 518 F. Supp. 789 (W.D. Va. 1981), concerned whether or not patients who had been involuntarily sterilized in Lynchburg Training School and Hospital, a state mental institution in Virginia, as part of a program of eugenics in the early and mid-20th century had their constitutional rights violated. The case had been filed in 1980 by the American Civil Liberties Union's Reproductive Freedom Project on behalf of 8,000 women who had been sterilized under the program. The court ruled that the sterilization did not violate constitutional rights, and that though the statute on involuntary sterilization of "mental defectives" had since been repealed, it had previously been upheld as constitutional (in Buck v. Bell, 1927).

However, the fact that state officials did not notify or provide subsequent medical services to the sterilized individuals was found to merit further consideration by the court. In a settlement reached in 1985, the state agreed to inform the women about what had been done to them and to help them get counseling and medical treatment.
