= Virginia State Colony for Epileptics and Feebleminded =

State run institution run by eugenicists

Coordinates: 37°24′57″N 79°7′11″W

The Virginia State Colony for the Epileptics and Feeble Minded was the original name of a state run institution for those considered to be “Feeble minded” or those with severe mental impairment. The colony opened in 1910 near Lynchburg, Virginia, in Madison Heights with the goal of isolating those with mental disabilities and other qualities deemed unfit for reproduction away from society. The colony was the home of Carrie Buck, the subject of the landmark Supreme Court case Buck v. Bell. The institution changed names and focus several times, and was most recently renamed in 1983 as the Central Virginia Training Center. The facility closed permanently in 2020.

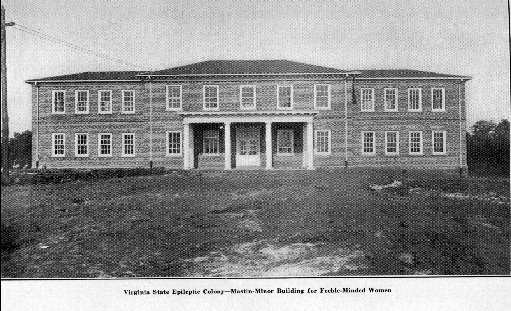
First opened in 1910 as the Virginia State Epileptic Colony.

== History of the Colony ==
The colony was authorized by a 1906 bill written by eugenicist and social welfare advocate Aubrey Strode, in collaboration with eugenicists Albert Priddy and Joseph DeJarnette. The colony received its first patients in 1911 and by the end of the calendar year had more than 150 men who suffered from epilepsy, a condition of social abhorrence. Colonies like the Virginia State Colony had been established in order to separate the disabled from criminal populations, for example, many of the first inhabitants of the Virginia State Colony had previously been housed in prisons and state hospitals. Originally, only men could be patients of the colony, but after roughly one year of operation, superintendent Priddy allowed women into the colony who were diagnosed as feeble-minded. In accordance with the change in potential patients, the colony changed from its original name, the Virginia Colony for Epileptics to the Virginia Colony for Epileptics and Feebleminded in 1914.

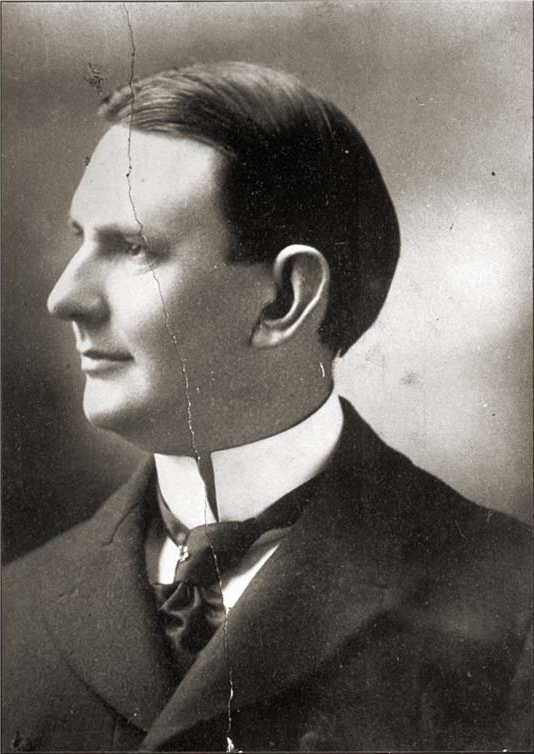
Dr. Albert Priddy in 1912, photo from Eugenics Archive

=== Dr. Albert Priddy and Carrie Buck ===
Priddy, a central figure in the legalization of forced sterilization of the mentally feeble was the first superintendent of the colony. Priddy had long been a proponent of sterilization as a potential method for controlling the harm the feeble minded could have on a society. Priddy in fact performed roughly 80 sterilizations between 1916 and 1917 and thought that these procedures yielded favorable results. Carrie Buck, a poor, pregnant 17-year-old child from a broken home arrived at the Colony on June 4, 1924. Her mother, Emma Buck was already a patient of the colony, thus joining both mother and daughter in the camp. Priddy sought Carrie to be a patient of the camp as a way to showcase eugenic ideas of heredity to support Virginia's sterilization law and eventually move the law all the way up to the supreme court. The three generations of the Buck family and Carrie's impending sterilization became the focus of the landmark supreme court case Buck v. Bell. Priddy died before the case reached the Supreme Court, but nonetheless on May 2, 1927, the Supreme Court decided that Virginia's sterilization law was constitutional.

==== Post Buck v. Bell ====
Following the decision upholding the constitutionality of Virginia's sterilization law in 1927, sterilizations began to take place at the Virginia Colony itself. Carrie Buck was sterilized on October 19, 1927, and this began a long run of sterilizations at the colony. In the six years following the decision in Buck v. Bell, the state of Virginia performed 1,333 sterilizations. The last reported sterilization at the colony occurred in 1956. Shortly after the death of Priddy in 1926, Dr. John Bell took over as superintendent of the Virginia Colony. Under his leadership, the colony not only doubled in size, but increased its educational efforts to aid the feeble-minded population of Virginia. The name was changed to Lynchburg State Colony in 1940, Lynchburg Training School and Hospital in 1954, and since 1983, has been known as the Central Virginia Training Center. The records of Central Virginia Training Center can be found at the Library of Virginia.

=== Segregation ===
The Virginia State colony was a center for feeble minded whites only. Blacks were not admitted to the colony throughout its early years. However, the state of Virginia in 1939 created the Petersburg Colony for the care of blacks who were deemed either “insane” or “feebleminded.” The poorly-funded colony was a work camp for its 182 patients who were deemed as having “borderline intelligence.”

== Contemporary usage ==
The institution remained integral in the treatment of those with mental disabilities in the State of Virginia. In 1983, the facility was renamed to the Central Virginia Training Center. The institution's mission statement emphasized, "The Central Virginia Training Center is committed to providing effective, compassionate and individually responsive services to persons with intellectual disabilities...empowering safe, healthy and enriched lives for the individuals in our care." Additionally, the facility functioned as an assisted living center and held classes for some of its patients with the hope of eventual community placement.

=== Investigation into compliance with the Americans with Disabilities Act ===
Starting in 2008, the United States Department of Justice Civil Rights Division launched an investigation into the quality of CVTC and three other state-run care facilities throughout Virginia. The investigation lasted three years, and found multiple inadequacies in the care of disabled persons within CVTC, including the failure to develop a sufficient quantity of community-based alternatives for individuals with complex needs, improper allocation of funds for community-based programs, and a flawed discharge program which did not sufficiently prepare patients for discharge from the facility and integration into the community. Specific violations of the Americans with Disabilities Act of 1990 include unnecessary institutionalization of patients into segregated settings, exposed to repeated accidents and injuries, inadequate dietary and physical support, and the undue use of restraint mechanisms found during the 2008-2009 visits to the facility. The investigation found many patients at the CVTC could be better served by integrating them into the community with proper services and more freedom; however it was found that multiple patients which were evaluated as discharge-ready were not placed on the discharge list, often for multiple years past evaluation.

== Closure ==
As part of a settlement reached from the investigation into the quality of care and compliance with the Americans with Disabilities Act, in 2012 then-governor Bob McDonnell announced the facility would close by 2020 and the former residents resettled. During the following years, operations were reduced, and by December 2018, The Central Virginia Training Center had just 65 patients. In 2020, the last residents were relocated and the facility was closed permanently on April 2. As of 2025, the buildings stand abandoned, and the land is in the planning stages of redevelopment into a medium-density urban hub for the neighboring town of Madison Heights.

== See also ==
- Poe v. Lynchburg Training School & Hospital
