= Skinner v. Oklahoma =

- Supreme Court of the United States

Argued May 6, 1942 Decided June 1, 1942
- Full case name: Skinner v. Oklahoma ex. rel. Williamson, Attorney General
- Citations: 316 U.S. 535 (more) 62 S.Ct. 1110, 86 L.Ed. 1655

Case history
- Prior: Skinner v. State, 139 Okla. 235 (Okla., 1941), 115 P.2d 123
- Subsequent: Skinner v. State, 195 Okla. 106 (Okla., 195), 155 P.2d 715

Holding
- A statute of Oklahoma provides for the sterilization, by vasectomy or salpingectomy, of "habitual criminals" — a habitual criminal being defined therein as any person who, having been convicted two or more times, in Oklahoma or in any other State, of "felonies involving moral turpitude," is thereafter convicted and sentenced to imprisonment in Oklahoma for such a crime. Expressly excepted from the terms of the statute are certain offenses, including embezzlement. As applied to one who was convicted once of stealing chickens and twice of robbery, held that the statute violated the equal protection clause of the Fourteenth Amendment. Oklahoma Supreme Court reversed.

Court membership
- Chief Justice Harlan F. Stone Associate Justices Owen Roberts · Hugo Black; Stanley F. Reed · Felix Frankfurter; William O. Douglas · Frank Murphy; James F. Byrnes · Robert H. Jackson

Case opinions
- Majority: Douglas, joined by unanimous
- Concurrence: Stone
- Concurrence: Jackson

Laws applied
- U.S. Const. Amendment XIV
- This case overturned a previous ruling or rulings
- Buck v. Bell (1927) (in part)

Skinner v. State of Oklahoma, ex rel. Williamson, 316 U.S. 535 (1942), is a unanimous United States Supreme Court ruling that held that laws permitting the compulsory sterilization of criminals are unconstitutional as it violates a person's rights given under the 14th Amendment of the United States Constitution, specifically the Equal Protection Clause and the Due Process Clause. The relevant Oklahoma law applied to "habitual criminals" but excluded white-collar crimes from carrying sterilization penalties.

== Background ==
In 1935, the Supreme Court of Oklahoma ruled in favor of the Habitual Criminal Sterilization Act, which allowed the state to impose a sentence of compulsory sterilization as part of their judgment against individuals who had been convicted three or more times of crimes "amounting to felonies involving moral turpitude". Exceptions to that ruling were those who committed what are considered white-collar crimes.

All defendants were provided with a jury trial organized by the State Attorney. The jury was asked whether the defendant was a habitual criminal according to the definition of the act and, if so, to conclude that sterilization would have no other negative effect on the defendant's health; if the jury so determined, the defendant would be punished by sterilization. Most punitive sterilization laws, including the Oklahoma statute, prescribed vasectomy for males and salpingectomy for females as the method of rendering the individual infertile.

The Sterilization Act was first put to use in May 1936. Hubert Moore, a five-time convict, was the first individual the state had given an approved petition for sterilization. When other prisoners heard the news of the approved petition, they rioted and attempted to escape. Hubert Moore escaped from prison in June 1936.

The second petition approved was for Jack T. Skinner, convicted once for stealing chickens and twice for armed robbery. In October 1936, he was convicted a fourth time and sentenced to sterilization. Skinner's lawyers, Heba Irwin Aston and Guy Andrews, took their appeal to the Supreme Court of Oklahoma, claiming jeopardization of Skinner's rights as given under the Fourteenth Amendment of the United States Constitution. The Supreme Court of Oklahoma ruled against the appeal 5–4 and maintained the sentence of sterilization.

Skinner's lawyers challenged the ruling of the Supreme Court of Oklahoma by bringing an appeal to the United States Supreme Court. The oral arguments were heard May 6, 1942, and the decision was given on June 1, 1942.

== Decision ==
The Court held unanimously that the Act violated the Equal Protection Clause of the Fourteenth Amendment because those convicted of white-collar crime, such as embezzlement, were excluded from the Act's jurisdiction.

Justice William O. Douglas concluded:

Oklahoma makes no attempt to say that he who commits larceny by trespass or trick or fraud has biologically inheritable traits which he who commits embezzlement lacks. We have not the slightest basis for inferring that line has any significance in eugenics, nor that the inheritability of criminal traits follows the neat legal distinctions which the law has marked between those two offenses. In terms of fines and imprisonment, the crimes of larceny and embezzlement rate the same under the Oklahoma code. Only when it comes to sterilization are the pains and penalties of the law different. The equal protection clause would indeed be a formula of empty words if such conspicuously artificial lines could be drawn.

Furthermore, because of the social and biological implications of reproduction and the irreversibility of sterilization operations, Justice Douglas also stressed that compulsory sterilization laws in general should be held to strict scrutiny:

The power to sterilize, if exercised, may have subtle, far-reaching and devastating effects. In evil or reckless hands it can cause races or types which are inimical to the dominant group to wither and disappear. There is no redemption for the individual whom the law touches. Any experiment which the State conducts is to his irreparable injury. He is forever deprived of a basic liberty. We mention these matters not to reexamine the scope of the police power of the States. We advert to them merely in emphasis of our view that strict scrutiny of the classification which a State makes in a sterilization law is essential, lest unwittingly, or otherwise, invidious discriminations are made against groups or types of individuals in violation of the constitutional guaranty of just and equal laws.

In a separate concurring opinion, Chief Justice Harlan F. Stone stated that while he concurred with Justice Douglas's opinion, he believed that in his opinion, the Act violated the Due Process Clause, specifically procedural due process, more than it violated the Equal Protection Clause. His main argument was that for legislation to convict and sterilize the defendant, there needed to be proof that criminal behavior could be inherited genetically, which the court had none at the time. He cited Buck v. Bell and said that because it has been proven that feeblemindedness is inheritable, sterilization was acceptable, but in the case of Skinner v. Oklahoma, it was not.

== Aftermath ==
The only types of sterilization that the Court's ruling immediately ended were punitive sterilization. It did not directly comment on compulsory sterilization of the mentally disabled or the mentally ill and was not a strict overturning of Buck v. Bell (1927). Furthermore, most of the over 64,000 sterilizations performed in the US under the aegis of eugenics legislation were not in prison institutions or performed on convicted criminals. Punitive sterilizations made up only negligible amounts of the total operations performed, as most states and prison officials were nervous about their legal status, which was not affirmed in Buck v. Bell specifically, as possible violations of the Eighth ("cruel and unusual punishment") or Fourteenth Amendments ("Due Process" and "Equal Protection Clauses"). Compulsory sterilizations of the mentally disabled and mentally ill continued in the US in significant numbers until the early 1960s. Although many state laws stayed on the books for many years longer, the last known forced sterilization on the basis of mental disability or mental illness in the United States occurred in 1981 in Oregon. Federal law prohibits use of federal funds to sterilize "any mentally incompetent or institutionalized individual", but states including California use state funds for tubal ligations. A 2013 report showed that between 2006 and 2010, at least 148 women were sterilized after childbirth while incarcerated in two California prisons. In violation of state rules passed in 1994, none of the cases were reviewed by a state oversight committee.

Over a third of all compulsory sterilizations in the United States (over 22,670) took place after Skinner v. Oklahoma. The 1942 ruling, however, created a nervous legal atmosphere regarding the other forms of sterilizations and put a heavy damper on sterilization rates, which had boomed since Buck v. Bell in 1927. After the discovery of the Nazi atrocities done in the name of eugenics, including the compulsory sterilization of 450,000 individuals in barely more than a decade, under a sterilization law, which drew heavy inspiration from American statutes, and the close association between eugenics and racism, eugenics, as an ideology, lost almost all public favor.

In Equal Protection analysis, Skinner applied the compelling state interest test to punitive sterilization, but Buck applied the less rigorous rational basis test to compulsory sterilization of the mentally disabled.

In 2002, the United States Court of Appeals for the Ninth Circuit held that an inmate, incarcerated by the California Department of Corrections and serving a life sentence, was not permitted to inseminate his wife artificially because "the right to procreate is fundamentally inconsistent with incarceration". The Appellate Court distinguished the case from Skinner v. Oklahoma because "the right to procreate while incarcerated and the right to be free from surgical sterilization by prison officials are two very different things."

== See also ==
- List of United States Supreme Court cases by the Stone Court
- List of United States Supreme Court cases, volume 316
- Sex-related court cases in the United States
- Stump v. Sparkman, 435 U.S. 349 (1978)
