= H. Bentley Glass =

American geneticist and columnist (1906–2005)

- Born: January 17, 1906; Laizhou, Shandong, China
- Died: January 16, 2005 (aged 98); Boulder, Colorado
- Education: Baylor University, University of Texas
- Known for: Editing The Quarterly Review of Biology and Science, as well as several influential symposium volumes
- Awards: AAAS Philip Hauge Abelson Prize (1991)
- Scientific career
- Fields: Genetics
- Workplaces: Johns Hopkins University; State University of New York at Stony Brook
- Doctoral advisor: Hermann Joseph Muller

Hiram Bentley Glass (January 17, 1906 – January 16, 2005) was an American geneticist and noted columnist.

== Career ==
Born in China to missionary parents, he attended college at Baylor University in Texas. He then furthered his education at the University of Texas, where he received his Ph.D. degree under the mentorship of geneticist Hermann Joseph Muller. His first major academic appointment was at Johns Hopkins University, where he was also a regular columnist for the Baltimore Evening Sun newspaper. He taught at Stephens College in Columbia, Missouri and at Goucher College in Maryland before joining the faculty at Johns Hopkins.

Glass was a frequent attendee of the Cold Spring Harbor Laboratory Symposia. In 1965, Glass became the first academic vice-president and professor of biological sciences at the State University of New York at Stony Brook. He was an honorary member of the National Association of Biology Teachers. He was elected to the American Academy of Arts & Sciences and the United States National Academy of Sciences in 1959, and to the American Philosophical Society in 1963. Glass was a critic of creationism.

Glass's scientific papers were donated to and are available at the American Philosophical Society.

Throughout his long scientific career, he held many distinguished academic titles, including

- Editor of The Quarterly Review of Biology, 1944-1986
- Editor of Science, 1953
- President of the American Institute of Biological Sciences (AIBS), 1954-1956
- President of the Maryland Chapter of the American Civil Liberties Union (ACLU), 1955-1965
- President of the American Association of University Professors (AAUP), 1958-1960
- Chairman of the Board of the Biological Sciences Curriculum Study (BSCS), 1959-1965
- President of the American Society of Human Genetics (ASHG), 1967
- President of Phi Beta Kappa, 1967-1970
- President of the American Association for the Advancement of Science (AAAS), 1969
- President of the National Association of Biology Teachers (NABT), 1971

== Glass on Genetic Determinism ==
Like his doctoral mentor H. J. Muller, Glass was deeply troubled by eugenics. In response to the views of Charles Davenport, Morris Steggerda and others, Glass wrote an essay, "Geneticists Embattled: Their Stand Against Rampant Eugenics and Racism in America During the 1920s and 1930s" (1986). The following excerpt is emblematic:

"Let us remember that the genes which are passed down in the egg and sperm from one generation to another are simply molecules of DNA, selected over eons as providing individuals to survive in a real world and to reproduce when mature. The genes control only the kinds of proteins that are actually made in the cell and tissues of the growing, developing individual, or control the turning on and turning off of these synthetic processes at appropriate times and in appropriate tissues during development. Their effects, whether fortunate or unfortunate, depend on the circumstances of the environment, biological, social cultural. Behavior reflects the changes in state and attitude assumed by a growing, developing being as its situation becomes altered. Darwinian evolution is based on the selection (read “preservation” or “perpetuation”) of whatever genetic differences promote survival and reproduction, although that may include even such forms of behavior as altruism if thereby genes like those of the self-sacrificing individual are preserved in the related beings saved from death or infertility. But the circumstances—-that is, the environment—-define what is a “good” gene and what is a “bad” one. The flaw in Social Darwinism, and likewise in the over-extended sociobiology, is to ignore the interdependency of genes and environment—-to think in absolute terms of good or bad genes, good or bad phenotypes."

(excerpt from "Geneticists Embattled," p. 148)

== Editorial work ==
In collaboration with William McElroy he edited several symposium volumes, including The chemical basis of heredity, with authors including François Jacob, Erwin Chargaff, Severo Ochoa, Arthur Kornberg, Max Delbrück and Francis Crick. In his review of The chemical basis of heredity Conrad Waddington wrote as follows:

It deals with the most fundamental problem of analytical biology — the chemical nature and functioning of the basic units on which biological organisms are based. The contributors are ... of the very highest standard ... Workers in the large field of chromosomes, genes, nucleic acids and viruses will find the book essential.

== Selected bibliography ==
- Bentley Glass Progress or Catastrophe: The Nature of Biological Science and Its Impact on Human Society (Praeger Publishers, 1985). ISBN 0-275-90107-6
- Bentley Glass, Owsei Temkin, William L. Straus, Jr. Forerunners of Darwin, 1745-1859 (The Johns Hopkins University Press, 1959) (2nd edition, 1968) ISBN 0-8018-0222-9
- Bentley Glass "The Biology of Nuclear War," The American Biology Teacher, Vol. 24, No. 6 (Oct. 1962), pp. 407–425. doi:10.2307/4440018
- Bentley Glass "Ethical Basis of Science" (Haifa, Technion-Israel Institute of Technology, 1969) — 27 pages; Lecture #3 of 3 John Calvin McNair Lectures at the University of North Carolina at Chapel Hill, 1965
- Bentley Glass "Science and ethical values" (Greenwood Press, 1981) ISBN 978-0313231414; 2012 e-book (The John Calvin McNair Lectures at the University of North Carolina at Chapel Hill, 1965)
- Bentley Glass "“Geneticists Embattled: Their Stand Against Rampant Eugenics and Racism in America During the 1920s and 1930s,” Proceedings of the American Philosophical Society, Vol. 130, No. 1 (1986) pp. 130–155
