= International Eugenics Conference =

20th-century global conferences

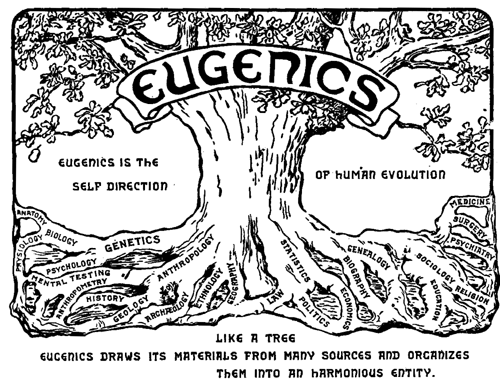
"Eugenics is the self-direction of human evolution": Logo from the Second International Eugenics Congress, 1921

Three International Eugenics Congresses took place between 1912 and 1932 and were the global venue for scientists, politicians, and social leaders to plan and discuss the application of programs to improve human heredity in the early twentieth century.

== Background ==
Assessing the work of Charles Darwin, and pondering the experience of animal breeders and horticulturists, Francis Galton wondered if the human genetic make-up could be improved: “The question was then forced upon me - Could not the race of men be similarly improved? Could not the undesirables be got rid of and the desirables multiplied?” This concept of eugenics - a term he introduced - soon won many adherents, notably in North America and England. First practical steps were taken in the United States of America. The government under Theodore Roosevelt created a national Heredity Commission that was charged to investigate the genetic heritage of the country and to “(encourage) the increase of families of good blood and (discourage) the vicious elements in the cross-bred American civilization”. Charles Davenport supported by the Carnegie Institution established the Eugenics Record Office. Further significant funding for the eugenics movement came from E. H. Harriman and Vernon Kellogg. In an effort to eradicate unfit offspring sterilization laws were passed, the first one in Indiana (1907), then in other states, many strictly for eugenic reasons, "to better the race," allowing for compulsory sterilization. Other eugenic laws limited the right to marry.

== The First International Eugenics Congress (1912) ==
The First International Eugenics Congress took place in London on July 24–29, 1912. It was organized by the British Eugenics Education Society and dedicated to Galton who had died the year prior. Major Leonard Darwin, the son of Charles Darwin, was presiding, with First Lord of the British Admiralty Winston Churchill as Vice-President. The five-day meeting saw about 400 delegates at the University of London, one of three held between 1912 and 1932. It was organised by the Eugenics Education Society of Britain (Pearl, 1912). Luminaries included Lord Alverstone, the Chief Justice, Arthur Balfour, as well as the ambassadors of Norway, Greece, and France. In his opening address Darwin indicated that the introduction of principles of better breeding procedures for humans would require moral courage. The American exhibit was sponsored by the American Breeders' Association and demonstrated the incidence of hereditary defects in human pedigrees. A report by Bleeker van Wagenen presented information about American sterilization laws and propagated compulsory sterilization as the best method to cut off “defective germ-plasm”. In the final address, Major Darwin extolled eugenics as the practical application of the principle of evolution.

== The Second International Eugenics Congress (1921) ==
The second Congress, originally scheduled for New York in 1915, met at the American Museum of Natural History in New York on September 25–27, 1921 with Henry Fairfield Osborn presiding. Alexander Graham Bell was the honorary president. The State Department mailed the invitations around the world. Under American leadership and dominance - forty-one out of fifty-three scientific papers - the work of the eugenists disrupted by World War I in Europe was to resume. Delegates participated not only from Europe and North America, but also from Latin America (Mexico, Cuba, Venezuela, El Salvador, and Uruguay), and Asia (Japan, India, Siam). The major guest speaker, Major Darwin, advocated eugenic measures that needed to be taken, namely the "elimination of the unfit", the discouragement of large families in the "ill-endowed", and the encouragement of large families in the "well-endowed". The Average Young American Male composite statue created by Jane Davenport Harris was exhibited during this congress and again at the Third as visual representation of the degeneracy of the white male body that would continue if advised eugenic measures were not taken.

== The Third International Eugenics Congress (1932) ==
The third meeting was arranged at the American Museum of Natural History in New York City August 22–23, 1932, dedicated to Mary Williamson Averell who had provided significant financial support, and presided by Davenport. Osborn's address emphasized birth selection over birth control as the method to better the offspring. F. Ramos from Cuba proposed that immigrants should be carefully checked for harmful traits, and suggested deportations of their descendants if inadmissible traits would become later apparent. Major Darwin, now 88 years old, was unable to attend but sent a report presented by Ronald Fisher predicting the doom of civilization unless eugenic measures were implemented. Ernst Rüdin was unanimously elected president of the International Federation of Eugenics Organizations (IFEO).

The congress published "A Decade of Progress in Eugenics", Scientific Papers of the Third International Congress of Eugenics.

A Fourth International Eugenics Conference was not convened. The IFEO held two more international meetings, one at Zurich in 1934 and the last one at Scheveningen in 1936.

In 1932, Hermann Joseph Muller gave a speech to the Third International Eugenics Congress, and stated "eugenics might yet perfect the human race but only in a society consciously organized for the common good."

== See also ==
- British Eugenics Society
- Eugenics in the United States
- Nazi eugenics
