= Torsten Sjögren =

Swedish psychiatrist and geneticist

- Born: Torsten Sjögren; 30 January 1896; Södertälje, Sweden
- Died: 27 July 1974 (aged 78); Gothenburg, Sweden
- Education: Stockholm, Lund university
- Known for: Die Internationale der Rassiten (For the Betterment of the Race), Sjögren–Larsson syndrome
- Awards: Royal Swedish Academy of Sciences
- Scientific career
- Fields: Psychiatry, genetics, eugenics
- Workplaces: Lund university, International Federation of Eugenic Organizations, Karolinska Institute

Karl Gustaf Torsten Sjögren (/ˈʃoʊɡrən/ SHOH-grən, Swedish: [ˈɧø̂ːɡreːn]; 30 January 1896 – 27 July 1974) was a Swedish psychiatrist and geneticist.

== Biography ==
He was born in Södertälje and died in Gothenburg. In Stockholm, he graduated as a licentiate of medicine in 1925, and in 1931 he became doctor of medicine and a docent of psychiatry at Lund university. Torsten Sjögren was the chairman of the International Federation of Eugenic Organizations in the late 1930s. According to Stefan Kühl in For the Betterment of the Race (originally Die Internationale der Rassiten 1997), Sjögren was submissive to the Nazi party with their increasingly controversial views on eugenics, which contributed to the disintegration of the organization in the latter half of the 1930s. Torsten Sjögren was professor of psychiatry at the Karolinska Institute from 1945 to 1961. He was elected a member of the Royal Swedish Academy of Sciences in 1951. Sjögren–Larsson syndrome is named after him (along with Tage Larsson) as well as Marinesco–Sjögren syndrome.

== Scientific work and reputation ==
Sjögren's 1931 thesis on juvenile amaurotic idiocy (the disorder now called juvenile neuronal ceroid-lipofuscinosis, or Batten disease) combined pedigree analysis with post-mortem histochemistry and proposed the first Mendelian model for the disease. Throughout the 1930s he argued that many forms of intellectual disability were genetically distinct entities and should be classified by inheritance pattern rather than symptom profile. This programme culminated in 1957 with his monograph‐length paper on Sjögren-Larsson syndrome, in which he and dermatologist Tage Larsson linked congenital ichthyosis, spastic diplegia and oligophrenia to a single autosomal recessive gene—an interpretation confirmed decades later when fatty aldehyde dehydrogenase (FALDH) mutations were identified.

At the Karolinska Institute (1945–1961) Sjögren established Sweden's first Department of Medical Genetics, introduced cytogenetic screening of institutionalised children, and launched a twin registry that became a cornerstone of Nordic behavioural genetics research. He also co-authored the description of Marinesco-Sjögren syndrome (1962), extending the clinical spectrum of congenital ataxias.

== Eugenics and later assessment ==
Between 1935 and 1939 Sjögren chaired the International Federation of Eugenic Organizations, steering it toward a "heredity-centred public-health agenda". According to the historian Stefan Kühl, his willingness to accommodate German racial hygienists—while personally rejecting anti-Semitism—contributed to the federation's collapse in 1939. Swedish commentators of the 1950s regarded his eugenic advocacy as an anachronism, yet psychiatric-genetics textbooks continue to cite his early family studies as methodological benchmarks.
