= Sjögren–Larsson syndrome =

- Other names: SLS
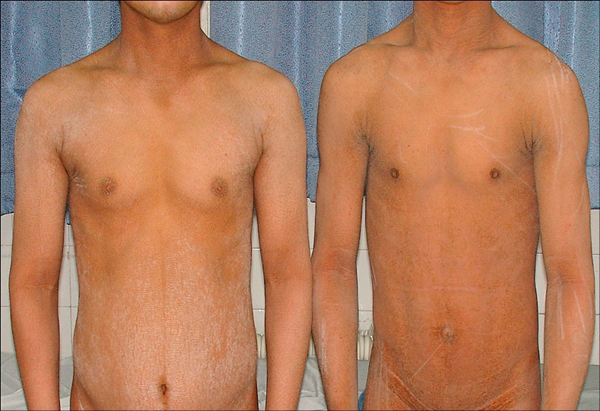
- Two brothers (21 and 25 years old) with generalized dryness of skin with fine scales mainly around the umbilicus and in the flexural folds, one of Sjögren–Larsson syndrome's characteristics
- Specialty: Medical genetics
- Frequency: 0.03%

Sjögren–Larsson syndrome is a rare autosomal recessive form of ichthyosis with neurological symptoms. It can be identified by a triad of medical disorders. The first is ichthyosis, which is a buildup of skin to form a scale-like covering that causes dry skin and other problems. The second identifier is paraplegia which is characterized by leg spasms. The final identifier is intellectual delay.

SLS is caused by a mutation in the fatty aldehyde dehydrogenase gene found on chromosome 17. In order for a child to receive SLS both parents must be carriers of the SLS gene. If they are carriers their child has a 1/4 chance of getting the disease. In 1957 Sjögren and Larsson proposed that the Swedes with the disease all descended from a common ancestor 600 years ago. Today only 30–40 persons in Sweden have this disease.

== Signs and symptoms ==
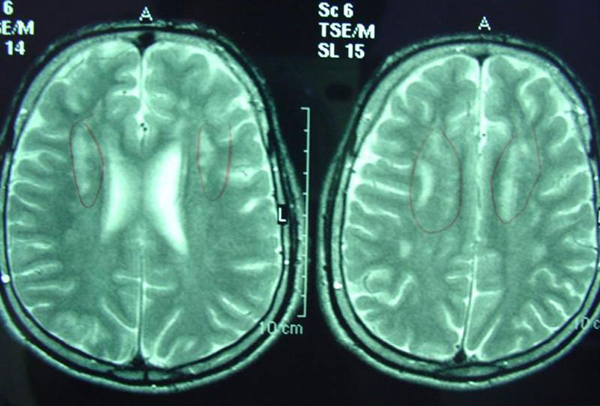
T2-weighted MRI images of a 25-year-old male with Sjögren–Larsson syndrome revealing dysmyelination in the deep periventricular white matter and reduced brain volume in the frontal lobe

- Dry and scaly skin similar to all other ichtyosiforms (types of ichthyosis).
- Neurological problems – this can often cause mild paralysis in the legs
- Mild to moderate intellectual disability.
- Often associated ocular features, which include pigmentary changes in the retina.

The usual presentation of crystalline maculopathy is from the age of 1–2 years onwards.

== Causes ==
It is associated with a deficiency of the enzyme fatty aldehyde dehydrogenase (ALDH3A2) which is encoded on the short arm of chromosome 17 (17p11.2). At least 11 distinct mutations have been identified.

Without a functioning fatty aldehyde dehydrogenase enzyme, the body is unable to break down medium- and long-chain fatty aldehydes which then build up in the membranes of the skin and brain. A major source of these aldehydes is alpha oxidation.

This condition is inherited in an autosomal recessive pattern.

== Diagnosis ==
Diagnosis is made with a blood test which sees if the activity of the fatty aldehyde dehydrogenase enzyme is normal. Gene sequencing can also be used, which can additionally be used by would-be parents to see if they are carriers.

== Treatment ==
The ichthyosis is usually treated with topical ointment. Anti-convulsants are used to treat seizures and the spasms may be improved with surgery.

== Eponym ==
It was characterized by Torsten Sjögren and Tage Konrad Leopold Larsson (1905–1998), a Swedish medical statistician. It should not be confused with Sjögren's syndrome, which is a distinct condition named after a different person, Henrik Sjögren. It also should not be confused with Marinesco–Sjögren syndrome, an unrelated condition named after Sjögren as well.

== See also ==
- Shabbir syndrome
- List of cutaneous conditions
