= Average Young American Male (1921) =

Composite model for American eugenics movement

The Average Young American Male
- Artist: Jane Davenport Harris
- Completion date: 1921
- Medium: Plaster
- Location: American Museum of Natural History (originally); Harvard Medical School Countway Library (currently)

The Average Young American Male, also known as the Average American Man and the American Adonis, was a 22-inch plaster statue sculpted in 1921 by Jane Davenport Harris as a composite model for the eugenics movement in the United States. The statue was exhibited at the Second and Third International Congresses of Eugenics in 1921 and 1932, respectively, as a visual representation of that which eugenicists considered to be the degeneration of the white race. While the statue received mixed responses from contemporary critics, it inspired the creation of additional composite statues as propaganda for the eugenics movement throughout the mid-twentieth century.

== Conception ==
Created in 1921, the figure was based on anthropometric measurements taken from 100,000 white U.S. Army recruits. Body measurements of drafted and demobilized American soldiers were commissioned by the Office of the Surgeon General and documented by Charles Davenport and Albert G. Love. The data collected was then averaged by Davenport's daughter Jane in order to create the final composite statue.

=== Eugenic Ideals ===
Such anthropometric studies had been used by eugenicists since the late nineteenth century to analyze various criminal, professional, and racial types of people. They were often represented visually through composite photography, one example of which was Francis Galton's composite portraiture. In the instance of the Average Young American Male, the use of sculpture as a medium allowed for three-dimensional examination of average body types.

Although the data had been collected from World War I soldiers, wartime effects on the men's physique were not discussed. Instead, the depicted decline in the average American male's body was attributed solely to biological inheritance and immigration. Henry Fairfield Osborn, co-founder of the Galton Society, delivered a speech alongside the exhibition that included the "Average Young American Male" statue, in which he encouraged the men in the room to realize that they were "engaged in a serious struggle to maintain our historic republican institutions through barring the entrance of those who are unfit to share the duties and responsibilities of our well-founded government."

== Exhibition ==
The composite statue was exhibited both the Second and Third International Eugenics Congresses held at the American Museum of Natural History in New York City, for the primary purpose of explaining the need for eugenic measures to a general public.

=== Second International Eugenic Congress ===
The exhibition in 1921 included a poster titled What is Eugenics? followed by this definition:

"that science which studies the inborn qualities – physical, mental, and spiritual – in man, with a view to their improvement. Nothing is more evident in the history of families, communities, and nations that, in the change of individuals from generation to generation, some families, some races, and the people of some nations, improve greatly in physical soundness, in intelligence and in character, industry, leadership, and other qualities which make for human breed improvement; while other racial, national, and family stocks die out – they decline in physical stamina, in intellectual capacity and in moral force" (Laughlin 1934, 13).

In order to illustrate the above eugenic idea of racial degeneracy, the exhibit included a pair of composite statues. At one end of the hall stood "The Average Young American Male, 100,000 White Veterans, 1919" and at the other stood "the Composite Athlete, 30 Strongest Men of Harvard." In her analytical essay "The American Adonis," Mary Coffey wrote that the contrast between the healthy, idealized body of the composite Harvard athlete and the pudgy stomach and flaccid muscles of the average young American male provided a persuasive visual representation of the eugenic notion that the national white body was degenerating as a result of ill-advised race mixing with inferior European stocks.

=== Third International Eugenic Congress ===
The first time the sculpture was shown, its juxtaposition with the composite sculpture of a Harvard athlete highlighted the degeneration to the Nordic body type caused by race mixing with "less evolved" white racial strains. In 1932, however, at the Third International Eugenic Congress, eight years after the passage of the Immigration Restriction Act, the statue was a stand-alone exhibit. Its interpretation during this Congress had shifted to a sign of the degeneracy of the average American male resulting from differential birthrate. Coffey proposes that this shift in interpretation of the sculpture paralleled a shift in eugenicist focus from immigrants being primarily responsible for race degeneracy to white, middle-class, educated women who were having fewer children as being the main cause of national genetic decline.

== Criticism ==
It was widely agreed that Davenport's sculpture revealed that the average white male's physical fitness was far from ideal. Journalists criticized his pudgy stomach, slouching posture, heavy hips, and undefined muscles and interpreted the statue as a symbol of American degeneracy.

The concept of composite statuary was also criticized by reviewers who denounced Davenport's statue as bearing no resemblance to life and a piece that does not deserve artistic merit. Because it was created using statistics, many art critics argued that the statue was not a true portrait of the average American and denounced it as a purely imaginary figure.

In 1932, writing for the New York Times, art critic Edward Alden Jewell asked rhetorically, "What is a work of art and what is a work of science?" His response to the sculpture included criticism of the growing authority of science to quantify and represent man over and against aesthetic canons of ideal beauty. Jewell referred to a conflict between the "Masterpiece" and the "Modeled Chart." He wrote that since the Average American Male statue was created on the basis of data, or "two-dimensional charts," collected from 100,000 "doughboys," he cannot be considered a work of art.

== Legacy ==
Despite criticism in 1921 during its first exhibition, the sculpture remained on display through the Third International Congress of Eugenics and inspired the creation of additional composite statues by various artists over the next couple decades, meant to further the eugenic agenda and represent different racial types. It is now currently on display on the 5th floor of the Harvard Medical School Countway Library, next to his female counterpart.
