= International Federation of Eugenics Organizations =

International organization focused on eugenics

The International Federation of Eugenic Organizations (IFEO) was an international organization of groups and individuals focused on eugenics. Founded in London in 1912, where it was originally titled the Permanent International Eugenics Committee, it was an outgrowth of the first International Eugenics Congress. In 1925, it was retitled. Factionalism within the organization led to its division in 1933, as splinter group the Latin International Federation of Eugenics Organizations was created to give a home to eugenicists who disliked the concepts of negative eugenics, in which unfit groups and individuals are discouraged or prevented from reproducing. As the views of the Nazi party in Germany caused increasing tension within the group and leadership activity declined, it dissolved in the latter half of the 1930s.

== History ==
In 1912, Leonard Darwin presided over an International Eugenics Congress at the University of London which was sponsored by the Eugenics Education Society (now the Adelphi Genetics Forum) in Britain. Over 800 attendees and an equal number of visitors gathered each day of the Congress to discuss the political, social and cultural context of eugenics and its practical applications. By its end, the Congress had established a Permanent International Eugenics Committee, of which Darwin was named president. In 1921, the Committee arranged for the second meeting of the International Eugenics Congress to take place, at the American Museum of Natural History in New York. Led by Henry Fairfield Osborn, Madison Grant, and Clarence Little, it focused on issues including human heredity, racial differences, regulation of human reproduction, and eugenics.

In 1925, the Committee was renamed the International Federation of Eugenic Organizations (IFEO). American eugenicist Charles Davenport was a dominant force in the early history of the body. As its president, in 1929, he wrote a letter to Benito Mussolini, then Prime Minister of Italy, warning him that "maximum speed [was] necessary" in implementing a eugenics program in Italy, because of the "enormous" danger of failing to control undesirable reproduction. The IFEO held its 9th Conference in England in 1930. Davenport led the IFEO meeting two years later in New York in 1932 at which Ernst Rüdin was selected as his successor to presidency. In the 1930s, the organization was meeting every two years, with a simultaneous Conference. By 1934, when the group met in Zurich, the original IFEO had representative organizations and individuals from Argentina, Belgium, Cuba, the Dutch East Indies, England, Estonia, France, Italy, Germany, South Africa, Switzerland, and the United States.

The IFEO's emphasis on negative eugenics, in which the unfit are eliminated from society through such measures as forced sterilization and laws against reproduction, led to the formation of a splinter group in 1933, when Italian sociologist Corrado Gini established the Latin International Federation of Eugenics Organizations specifically to give a place to organizations fundamentally opposed to the approach. The Latin International Federation of Eugenics Organizations had its first meeting in 1935 and soon represented groups from Argentina, Brazil, Catalonia, France, Mexico, Portugal, Romania, and Switzerland (French and Italian). Focused on encouraging reproduction of the "fit", the Latin International Federation of Eugenics Organizations was disrupted by the advent of World War II, its second congress cancelled, but Gini continued to promote positive eugenics until his death in 1965.

The IFEO began to struggle in the 1930s with the increasingly controversial views on Eugenics in Nazi Germany. Germany had not been permitted to join the IFEO until 1927 due to World War I and subsequent resistance to their membership by the French and Belgian, but the German stance dominated discussion in IFEO meetings in the 1930s. Reporting on the 1934 meeting in Zurich for the journal Eugenics Review, IFEO secretary Mrs. C.B.S. Hodson wrote:

A number of searching questions were exchanged with the different speakers. The Dutch in particular showed hesitancy in accepting the findings of transmissibility in regard to certain diseases as an adequate criterion for sterilization, while those coming from countries such as Switzerland, where the operation is a practical possibility and increasingly practised, found less difficulty in accepting the German point of view. In fact, between those critics who alleged that Germany was going too far and those (notably the French) who suggested that the categories should include more types, the protagonists of the new eugenic era in Germany appear to hold a middle course.

Of the 1936 meeting in the Netherlands, where Hodson indicates the views of Germany was a major focus, she wrote:

it emerged that castration of sex offenders is being widely demanded in Holland, while sterilization is still regarded with distaste and suspicion. Denmark, originally most cautious to avoid compulsion in sterilization, has now made this as well as other regulations for the feeble-minded, compulsory for that category. At the same time administrators in Denmark take the utmost care to use their powers with reserve until public confidence has been built up. Marriage laws are easily promulgated in Scandinavia; in Germany (supposed land of drastic legislation) advisory marriage bureaux are paving the way with careful and paternal help towards legislation, which may be withheld for some time.

The 1936 meeting, hosted in Scheveningen, was attended by 50 delegates from 20 countries. At that meeting, the term of the presidency was limited to four years, whereupon Rüdin was made honorary vice president along with Alfred Ploetz, Darwin and Jon Alfred Mjøen, newly elected. Torsten Sjögren was chosen as his successor after five nominees had refused the office. Under Sjögren's presidency, activity in the IFEO lapsed to the point that the British Eugenics Society, instrumental in founding the group, considered withdrawing. According to Stefan Kühl in For the Betterment of the Race (originally Die Internationale der Rassiten 1997), Sjögren was submissive to the Nazi party with their increasingly controversial views on eugenics, which contributed to the disintegration of the organization in the latter half of the 1930s.
