= Gertrude Crotty Davenport =

American zoologist (1866–1946)

- Born: February 28, 1866; Asequa, near Denver, Colorado, U.S.
- Died: March 8, 1946 (aged 80); Upper Nyack, New York, U.S.
- Occupation: Zoologist
- Spouse: Charles Benedict Davenport
- Children: Three, including Millia Crotty Davenport

Gertrude Anna Davenport (née Crotty; 1866–1946), was an American zoologist who worked as both a researcher and an instructor at established research centers such as the University of Kansas and the Cold Spring Harbor Laboratory where she studied embryology, development, and heredity. The wife of Charles Benedict Davenport, a prominent eugenicist, she co-authored several works with her husband. Together, they were highly influential in the United States eugenics movement during the progressive era.

== Life ==
Gertrude Anna Crotty was born 28 February 1866, in Asequa, Colorado (near Denver), to parents William and Millie (Armstrong) Crotty. She graduated from University of Kansas in 1889 where she stayed as an instructor for three years until she went to pursue a higher degree. She then became a graduate student at Radcliffe College (then known as the Society for Collegiate Instruction of Women). There are conflicting facts about her time at Radcliffe. According to Marilyn Bailey Ogilvie, she was there for two years but did not complete her degree. According to Nicole Hahn Rafter, she was there for five years doing graduate work in zoology and wrote her book The Primitive Streak and Notochordal Canal in Chelonia (1896). Tamsen Wolff said that she did earn her PhD in zoology. While attending Radcliffe, she met Charles Davenport, who was one of her zoology instructors. She married Charles in Burlington, Kansas on June 23, 1894, and went on to have three children. The eldest child was Millia Crotty Davenport, who was born on 30 March 1895. The middle child, Jane Joralemon Davenport, was born on 11 September 1897. The youngest, Charles Benedict Davenport Jr., was born on 8 January 1911. Gertrude played a major role in supporting the domestic, financial, and scientific life of Charles, co-authoring numerous papers with him, sharing management of the Cold Spring Harbor Biological Laboratory, and supervising his financial concerns and expenditures. Gertrude died on 8 March 1946, in Upper Nyack, New York at the age of 80.

== Scientific work ==
Davenport worked alongside her husband in the field of eugenics. Together they went to Cold Spring Harbor, New York in 1893 and stayed there working in a biology lab with microscopic methods until 1903. Afterwards she took on an unpaid position to work alongside Charles and assisted him in his research. This was research on experimental evolution and she collaborated with him on the books that he published. She also co-authored with him on a number of other of his works. While in Cold Spring Harbor, they bought a house with 6 acres on the coast. This residency was used for the laboratory staff to rent out while they did research on the heredity of humans. Gertrude later added 19 acres of land and it was named after her.

Gertrude and Charles did work on heredity which included studying eye, hair, and skin color of humans. She also did research on embryology using turtles, studied the differences between Sargatia (a type of sea anemone) and starfish as well the variations on other organisms. She encouraged her husband to continue working on Sir Francis Galton’s work on eugenics using Mendelian genetics. It is possible that Gertrude's interests in eugenics predate those of her husband. For example, her interests in the early 1900s included the "Tribe of Ishmael," an ethnic group frequently studied by American eugenicists, and the heredity exhibited in children of interracial marriages, suggesting that Gertrude may have played a considerable role in influencing Charles' interest in eugenics and his subsequent career development.

In her article from Cold Spring Harbor about the "Zero" family in "Zand," an anonymized clan in a European village, Davenport analyzes the branches of the Zero family tree. Using the work of Dr. Jörger from a Swiss insane asylum, Davenport discusses the favorable or "good" branches of the Zero family, characterized by industriousness, fiscal responsibility, good manners, strong morals, and in-group marriage, in comparison to the unfavorable branch, characterized by criminal behavior, alcoholism, vagabondage, and marriage to foreign women. Davenport remarks upon hereditary explanations for the two branches; she examined their physical phenotypes and even attempted to exclude environmental effects by considering the vagabondage developed in Zero children taken from their families and distributed to respectable caretakers. Her work attempts to highlight a heredity nature to criminal behavior, comparing this criminal breed of human's innate disposition to crime to that of a race horse's disposition to race. Her piece pushes a strong attitude associating degenerate heredity with matrilineal inheritance, as she traced the lineage of the criminal branches of the Zeros through blood-related and insane women. Davenport did not advocate for negative eugenics at the time, believing that the decline heredity and physical phenotypes of the vagabond branch would bring about its extinction on its own.

Gertrude and Charles worked on eugenics to breed better humans. They claimed that this type of eugenics, called negative eugenics, was a necessity. Gertrude was worried that those who were "feebleminded" would hide their heredity. Gertrude described man's interference in nature by beneficence toward those defective or delinquent as damaging to society as a whole. She believed these misguided efforts to be a result of excessive comfort with civilization and forgetfulness of the natural selection that produced humans who attained it. Gertrude described how a growing population of those "incompetent thru such bad heredity as imbecility, criminality, and disease entail" costing taxpayers significant and increasing losses, and described the developing eugenics movement under Francis Galton, Leonard Darwin, and her husband at Cold Springs Harbor as the solution. She described feeble-mindedness as a recessive trait, and worried that poorly organized marriages could result in the expression of feeble-mindedness in children. Hoping to eliminate feeble-mindedness and avoid heterozygote humans, Gertrude advocated for "segregating the weak-minded and imbecile." Gertrude sought a society that would protect itself from feeble-minded individuals, who are most often "paupers, prostitutes, rapists, and criminals;" to this end, she required humans to relinquish privacy of their genetic facts, as she believed feeble-minded individuals would conceal their defects.

== Published work ==
Gertrude and Charles Davenport had a productive working relationship which yielded many scientific works through the years. They produced two textbooks, the first of which was written for secondary students titled Introduction to Zoology. The second textbook was titled Elements of Zoology: To Accompany the Field and Laboratory Study of Animals and was to be used as a guide for zoology studies and experimentation. Charles and Gertrude's studies on genetics included Heredity of Skin Pigmentation in Man, Heredity of Eye Color in Man, and Heredity of Hair-Form in Man. During the course of these studies and publications, the Davenports explored how human traits, specifically skin pigmentation, eye color, and hair characteristics, were passed on to the next generation with Mendelian genetics. Each study also included a "practical application" statement on how the marriage of two individuals with certain traits influences the passing of said traits.

Gertrude also individually authored the monographs The Primitive Streak and Notochordal Canal in Chelonia (1896) and Variation in the Number of Stripes on the Sea-anemone, Sagartia luciae (1902). In the former study, the notochordal canal in turtle embryos was observed as the embryos developed. This study produces a series of descriptions of how the notochordal canal develops and some implications based on its development. In the latter study, samples of Sargatia were taken from Cold Spring Harbor and examined in a laboratory. Under a microscope, the sea anemones' cell division was examined in both natural conditions and artificially placed strain. During and after the division processes, the various stripe characteristics were noted and recorded from different samples.
