= Van Houten's Landing Historic District =

United States historic district in New York State

- U.S. National Register of Historic Places
- U.S. Historic district
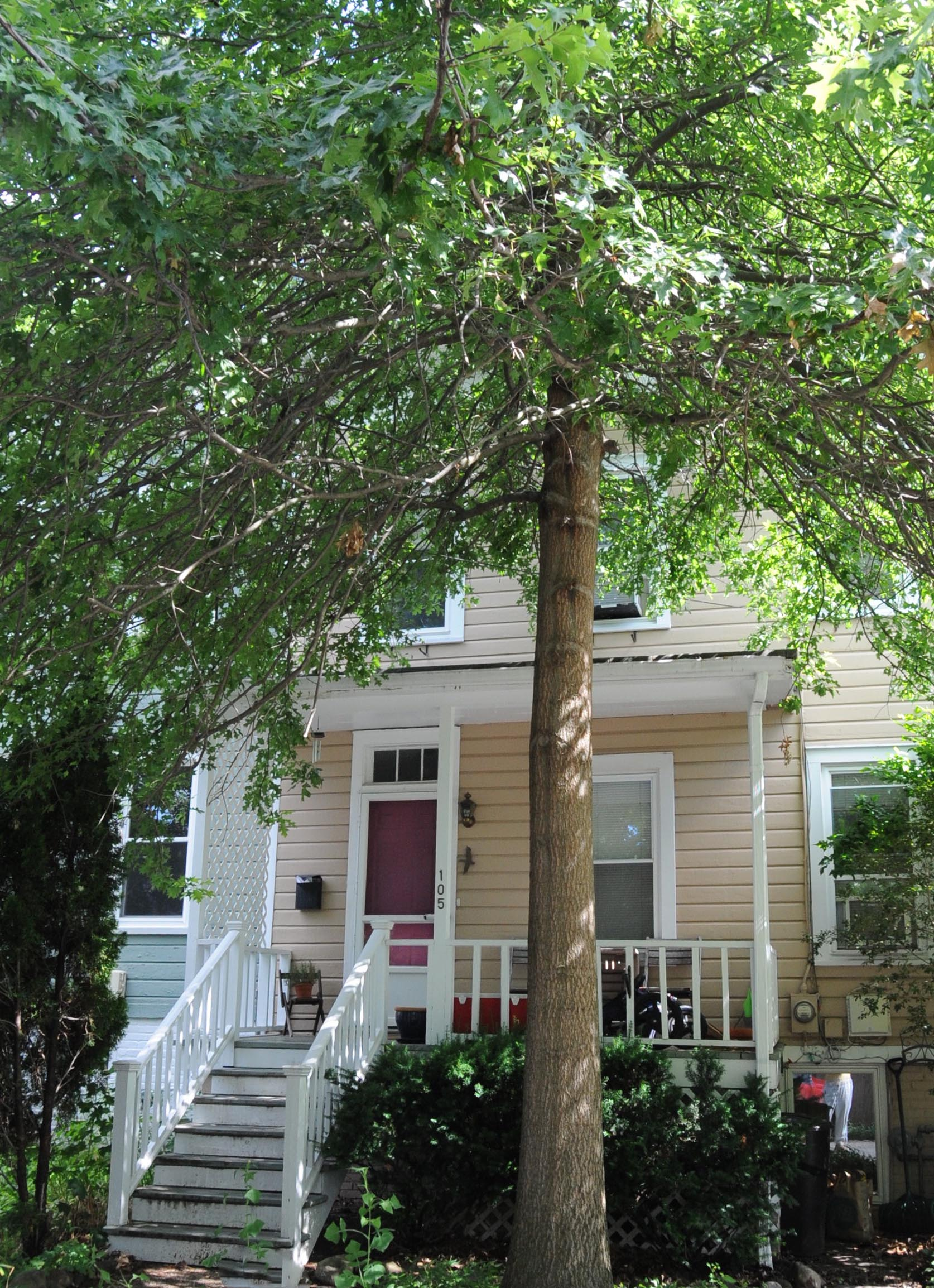
- House on School Street

- Location within New York Location within the United States
- Location: North Broadway, School St., Ellen St., Castle Heights Ave., Van Houten St., Upper Nyack, New York
- Coordinates: 41°6′2″N 73°55′0″W
- Area: 14 acres (5.7 ha)
- Built: 1798
- Architectural style: Greek Revival, Italianate, et al.
- NRHP reference No.: 04000877
- Added to NRHP: August 20, 2004

Van Houten's Landing Historic District is a national historic district located at Upper Nyack in Rockland County, New York. It encompasses 50 contributing buildings and two contributing structures in the historic core of Upper Nyack. The district developed after 1798 and includes notable examples of Greek Revival and Italianate style architecture. Located in the district is the separately listed Upper Nyack Firehouse. Other notable buildings include the Village Hall (c. 1870), John Lydecker House (c. 1814, 1830), C.A. Fellows House (c. 1840), James P. Vorhis House (c. 1884), Gilchrest House (c. 1820, 1890), and Voorhis Store (c. 1884).

It was listed on the National Register of Historic Places in 2004.
