= First Methodist Episcopal Church of Nyack =

Historic church in New York, United States

- U.S. National Register of Historic Places
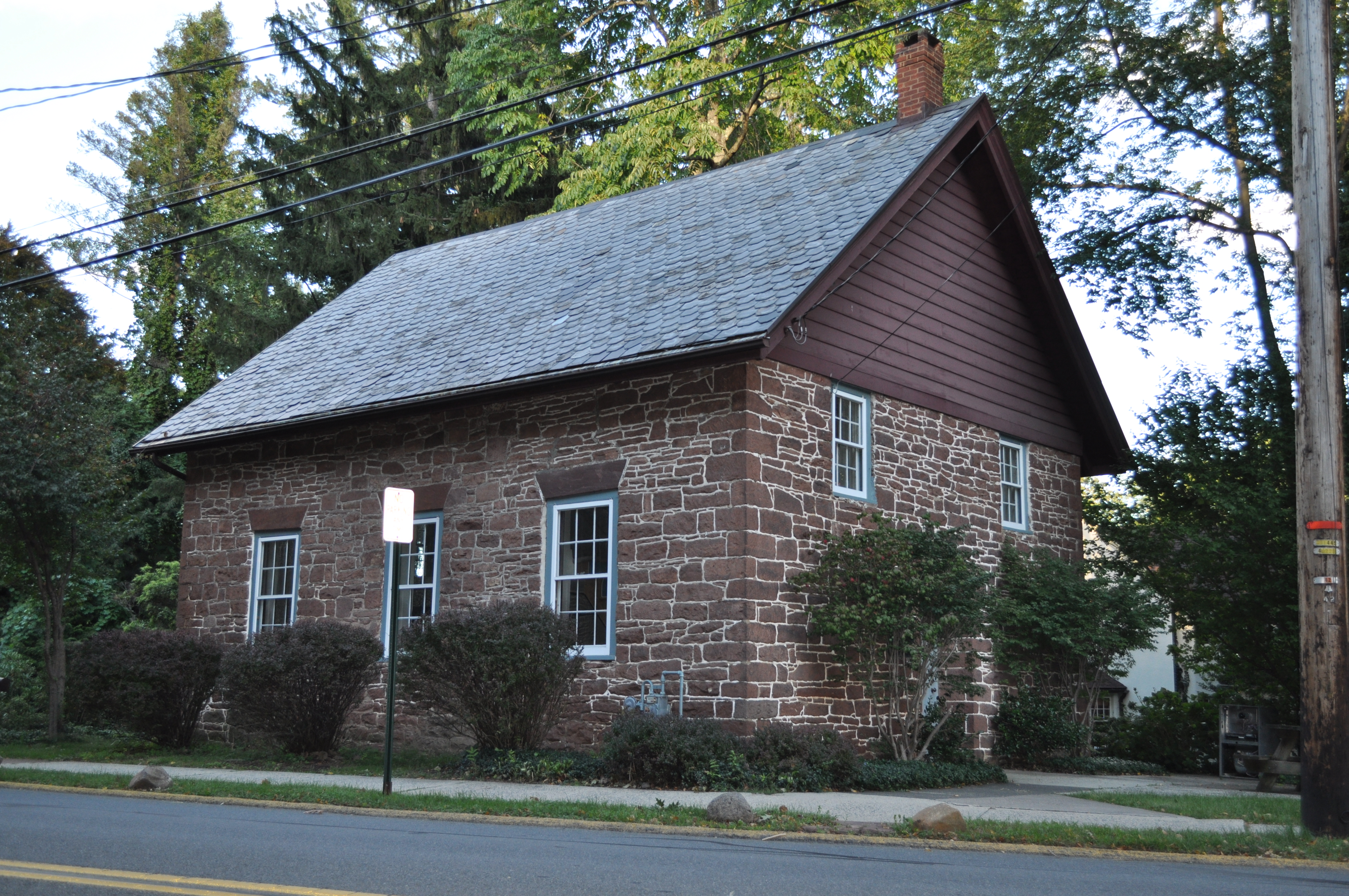

- Location within New York Location within the United States
- Location: North Broadway, S of jct. of North Broadway and Birchwood Ave., Upper Nyack, New York
- Coordinates: 41°6′12″N 73°55′4″W
- Area: less than one acre
- Built: 1813
- Architectural style: Federal
- NRHP reference No.: 98000132
- Added to NRHP: February 20, 1998

First Methodist Episcopal Church of Nyack, also known as Old Stone Church, is a historic Methodist Episcopal church on North Broadway, south of the junction of North Broadway and Birchwood Avenue in Upper Nyack, Rockland County, New York. It was built in 1812-1813 and is a one-story, three by two bay, sandstone building on a stone foundation. It has a moderately pitched gable roof.

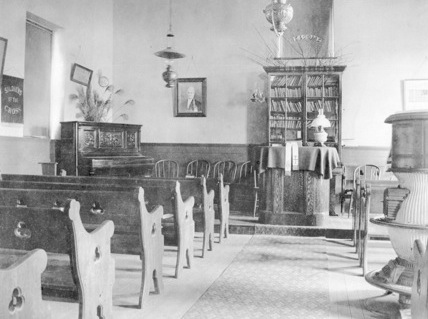
Early interior of the Old Stone Church

It was listed on the National Register of Historic Places in 1998. It was purchased by the village of Upper Nyack in 2007, and has since been used as a village meeting place and made available for private events.
