= SIL1 =

Protein-coding gene in the species Homo sapiens

Identifiers
- Aliases: SIL1, BAP, MSS, ULG5, SIL1 nucleotide exchange factor
- External IDs: OMIM: 608005; MGI: 1932040; GeneCards: SIL1

Gene location (Human)
Chr.	Chromosome 5 (human)
Band	5q31.2	Start	138,946,724 bp
Band	5q31.2	End	139,293,557 bp

Gene location (Mouse)
Chr.	Chromosome 18 (mouse)
Band	18|18 B1- B2	Start	35,399,449 bp
Band	18|18 B1- B2	End	35,632,833 bp
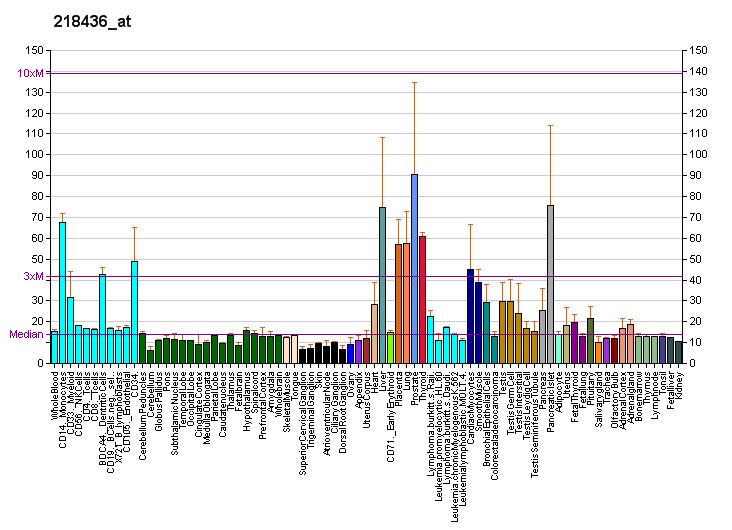
RNA expression pattern
Bgee	Human / Mouse (ortholog); Top expressed in: islet of Langerhans; body of pancreas; left testis; right testis; stromal cell of endometrium; right adrenal gland; right adrenal cortex; left adrenal gland; left adrenal cortex; right lobe of liver / Top expressed in: spermatocyte; spermatid; lacrimal gland; parotid gland; seminal vesicula; right kidney; Epithelium of choroid plexus; left lobe of liver; seminiferous tubule; proximal tubule; More reference expression data
BioGPS	More reference expression data
Gene ontology
Molecular function	unfolded protein binding; protein binding; adenyl-nucleotide exchange factor activity
Cellular component	endoplasmic reticulum lumen; endoplasmic reticulum; extracellular space; cytoplasm
Biological process	protein folding; protein transport; intracellular protein transport; transport; regulation of catalytic activity
Sources:Amigo / QuickGO
Orthologs
Databases	NCBI: entry; OMA: entry
Species	Human	Mouse
Entrez	64374	81500
Ensembl	ENSG00000120725	ENSMUSG00000024357
UniProt	Q9H173	Q9EPK6
RefSeq (mRNA)	NM_001037633; NM_022464	NM_030749; NM_001360814
RefSeq (protein)	NP_001032722; NP_071909	NP_109674; NP_001347743
Location (UCSC)	Chr 5: 138.95 – 139.29 Mb	Chr 18: 35.4 – 35.63 Mb
PubMed search
- Wikidata
View/Edit Human	View/Edit Mouse

Nucleotide exchange factor SIL1 is a protein encoded in humans by the SIL1 gene.

This gene encodes a resident endoplasmic reticulum (ER) N-linked glycoprotein with an N-terminal ER targeting sequence, two putative N-glycosylation sites, and a C-terminal ER retention signal. This protein functions as a nucleotide exchange factor for another unfolded protein response protein. Mutations in this gene have been associated with Marinesco-Sjogren syndrome. Alternative transcriptional splice variants have been characterized.

== Discovery and expression ==
In the mid-1990s, several laboratories independently discovered Sil1 in three different organisms. A conditional lethality screen was used in the yeast Yarrowia lipolytica to detect cellular components that interacted with the 7S RNA or the signal recognition particle (SRP) during co-translational translocation, which led to the identification of the Sls1p gene. Sls1p is an ER-luminal, 54 kDa protein that contains an N-terminal signal sequence and a C-terminal ER-retention motif. Sls1p fractionated with the membranous fraction and was shown to interact with the Sec61p translocation apparatus. Sls1p was induced by ER stresses, such as heat shock or inhibition of glycosylation, and its deletion resulted in decreased maturation of secretory proteins. This protein also bound to the ADP-bound form of Kar2p, the yeast homolog of BiP, and stimulated its interaction with Sec63, a DnaJ family member and a translocon component. Disruption of the interaction between Sls1p and Kar2p significantly affected the secretion of a reporter protein, leading the investigators to conclude that Sls1p assisted BiP in the translocation of nascent proteins into the ER lumen. Another group working with Saccharomyces cerevisiae conducted a screen for genes that would suppress the severe growth defect observed in the ΔIre1ΔLhs1 yeast double mutants when overexpressed and named this gene the suppressor of Ire1 and Lhs1 deletion 1 (Sil1). Sil1p was shown to be a homolog of Sls1p, and a combined deletion of Sil1p and Lhs1 (yeast GRP170) proved to be lethal after causing a total block in protein translocation into the ER. Mammalian (human) SIL1 was discovered in a yeast two-hybrid screen aimed at identifying proteins that interacted with a mutant ATPase domain of BiP and was initially named BiP-associated protein (BAP). Sequence analysis revealed that BAP is a mammalian homolog of Sls1p and Sil1p and is similar to the cytosolic HSP70-binding protein, HSPBP1. Biochemical data further demonstrated that BAP also had NEF activity for BiP.

== Structure and mechanism of nucleotide exchange ==
Structural data for yeast Sil1p revealed an elongated, “kidney bean”-like molecular shape that consists of 16 α-helices (A1–A16) and lacks β-sheets. The central helices A3-A14 form the armadillo (ARM)-like repeats (ARM1-ARM4), which are named after those found in β-catenin. Each ARM repeat is composed of three α-helices that pack into a superhelix. A crystal structure of yeast Sil1p complexed with the ADP-bound NBD of Kar2p/BiP revealed that the ARM domain of Sil1p wraps around lobe IIb of BiP’s NBD and makes additional contacts with lobe Ib. This interaction causes lobes Ib and IIb to rotate away from each other, leading to ADP release. Point mutations in the Sil1p-interacting site of Kar2p’s NBD specifically disrupted Sil1p binding but retained Kar2p’s ability to interact with Lhs1/GRP170, the other ER NEF, providing the first indication that their mechanisms of NEF activity were different. Homology mapping and comparisons with the structure of cytosolic HSPBP1 indicated that the region of SIL1 encoded by exons 6 and 9 constitutes major BiP-binding sites, and exon 10 encodes a minor interaction site.

== Tissue expression ==
Although SIL1 is ubiquitously expressed, levels vary widely by tissue. The Human Protein Atlas (www.proteinatlas.org) shows that the expression pattern of SIL1 mirrors that of BiP even more closely than that of GRP170, which is a known UPR target, as is BiP. Perhaps the different expression pattern for GRP170 is due to its dual function as a chaperone and a NEF for BiP. SIL1 expression at a single-cell level has also been determined in a number of tissues, which does not strictly correlate with the secretory capacity of the cell, and tissues displaying the highest relative levels of SIL1 are not necessarily those most affected by loss of its function. This might imply an additional function, which has been demonstrated for Sil1p, or an as yet undiscovered role of SIL1 in certain tissues. Understanding this reason for variation in tissue expression will require further studies.

== Interactions ==
SIL1 has been shown to interact with Binding immunoglobulin protein.
