= Claiborne Catlin Elliman =

American suffragist and political leader

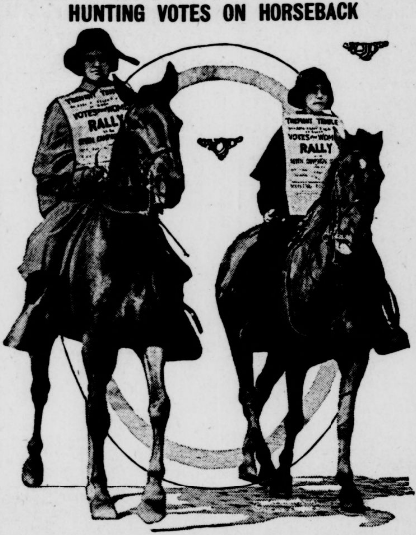
- Claiborne Catlin Elliman and Linda Marston on their ride to promote a suffrage meeting in Boston
- Born: 1880s Baltimore, Maryland, United States
- Education: New York School of Philanthropy
- Occupation: Activist
- Organization: National American Woman Suffrage Association
- Spouse: Joseph Albert Catlin

Claiborne Catlin Elliman was a 19th to 20th-century suffragist and political leader. Elliman's main political participation during her lifetime was in the suffrage movement and she was an active member of the National American Women Suffrage Association, otherwise known as NAWSA. She organized rallies, advocated for women, and spread information about suffrage throughout Massachusetts on horseback, where she lived for a large portion of her life.

== Background ==
Elliman was born in Baltimore, Maryland in the 1880s and she remained in Baltimore for many years before getting married at age twenty-eight. She married Joseph Albert Catlin, but he died four years after they married which left her to be a thirty-two-year-old widow.

== Education and employment ==
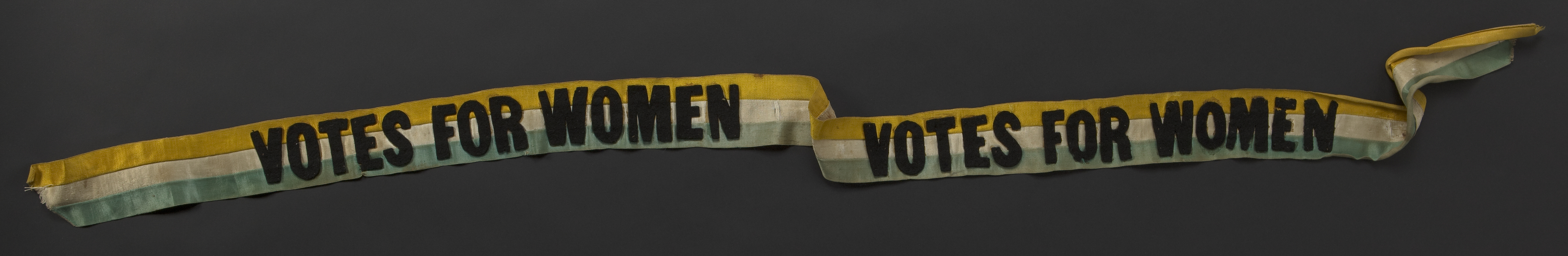
This is Claiborne Catlin's sash that she wore during her ride for women's suffrage.

After her husband's death, Elliman was reluctant to move back to her home so she moved to New York. There she went to the New York School of Philanthropy, a higher education institution that trained people to do social work, where she began to do settlement work. Additionally, she worked with Dr. Charles Davenport studying eugenics in Cold Spring Harbor, Long Island. In 1914 she got a job working at a psychological clinic at the University of Pennsylvania where she wrote an excerpt in The Psychological Clinic, Volume 8 titled, "Incorrigibility Due to Mismanagement and Misunderstanding".

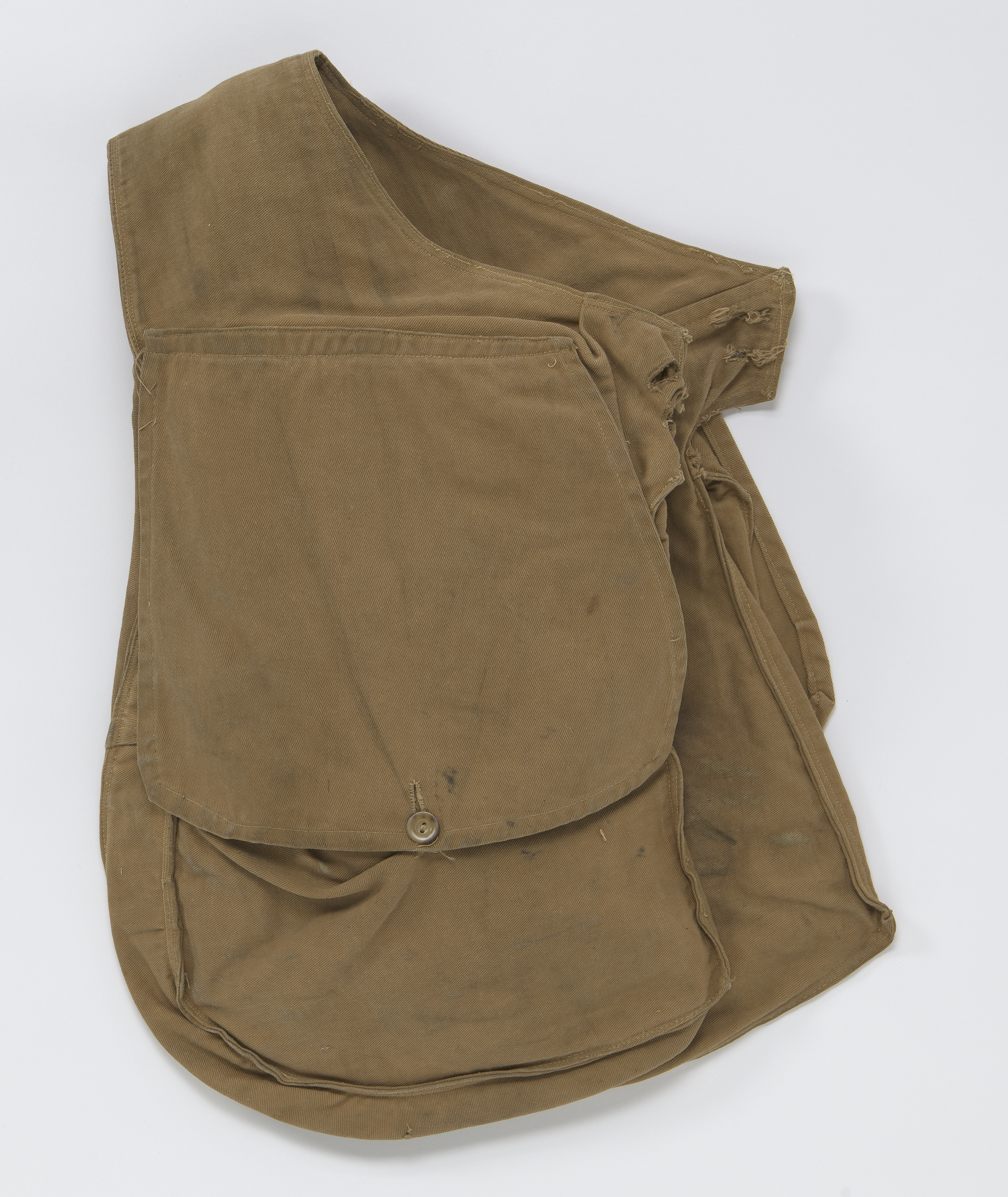
This is Claiborne Catlin's saddlebag she wore during her ride for suffrage.

== Political activism ==
During her work and educational experience, Elliman joined the suffrage movement and started her journey as a political activist. She joined the Massachusetts Political Equality Union and became a member of the National American Women Suffrage Association (NAWSA). As a member of NAWSA she was responsible for publicizing a rally that was to be held at Tremont Temple. She chose to spread news of the event by riding a horse through downtown Boston with fellow suffragist, Linda Marston, to call attention to the movement and gain supporters for the rally. Her work towards gaining supporters was wildly successful and inspired her to do the same thing on a larger scale. On July 2, 1914, Claiborne Caitlin began her horseback tour around Massachusetts to spread the word about women's suffrage. She received money with a collection box that was passed around for donations, since she started the journey without any money. She was a well-known horsewoman and planned to ride a horse named Trixie, who had competed and won in many horse races across the country. Claiborne packed very light because she was a minimalist, and only carried a raincoat and necessary feminine products in her saddlebag. She rode around in a khaki suit, leggings, and a sombrero with a feather. Her trip covered 530 miles, she visited 37 cities and organized 59 meetings along her trip. She felt it gave her purpose in the movement and in politics that she didn't have before joining the suffrage movement. It also gave her exhilaration and camaraderie to be a part of the women's suffrage movement.

== Legacy ==
While there was less documentation of Claiborne Catlin's involvement in the women's movement after her ride for suffrage, it left a significant mark on the history of the movement. Her passion for women's rights and suffrage was inspiring to other women and her ride for suffrage was well documented throughout the United States at the time in the press. Today, her sash and her saddlebags that she took with her on her ride for suffrage in 1914 are historically important and protected artifacts which represent her work in the women's movement.
