= Upper Nyack Firehouse =

- U.S. National Register of Historic Places
- U.S. Historic district – Contributing property
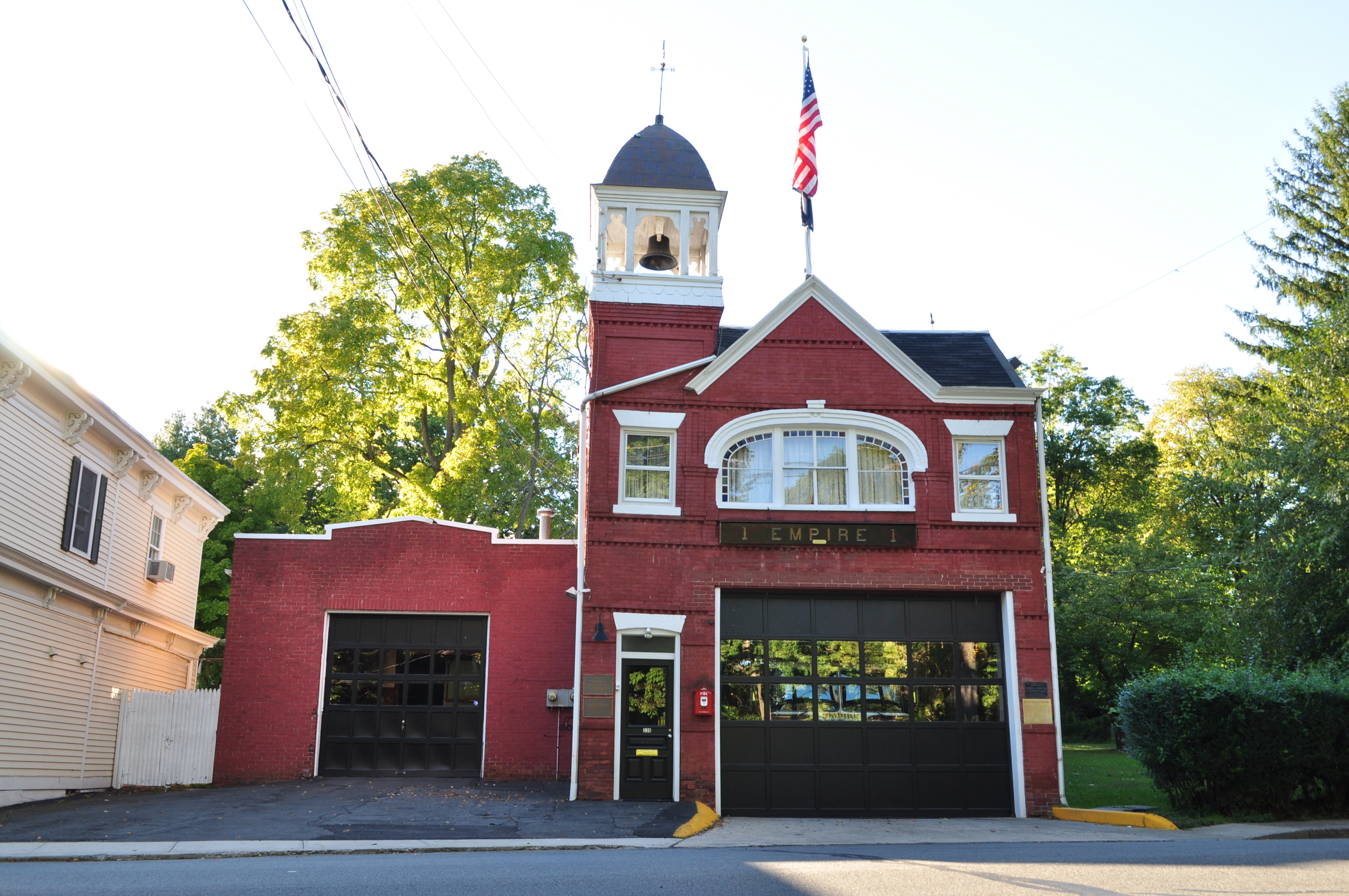

- Location within New York Location within the United States
- Location: 330 N. Broadway, Upper Nyack, New York
- Coordinates: 41°6′6″N 73°55′4″W
- Area: 9 acres (3.6 ha)
- Built: 1887
- Architect: Knapp, G.W.
- Architectural style: Queen Anne
- NRHP reference No.: 82004781
- Added to NRHP: September 23, 1982

Upper Nyack Firehouse, built for the Empire Hook & Ladder Company, No. 1, is a historic fire station located at Upper Nyack in Rockland County, New York, United States. It was completed in July 1887 and is a two-story brick structure in the Queen Anne style. It features a corner bell tower and center gable above the main engine door.

It was listed on the National Register of Historic Places in 1982. It is located in the Van Houten's Landing Historic District.
