= Millia Davenport =

American costume designer

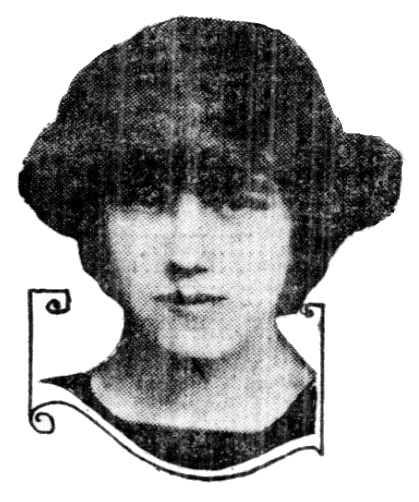
- Millia Davenport in 1920
- Born: March 30, 1895; Cambridge, Massachusetts
- Died: January 18, 1992 (aged 96); New City, New York
- Occupations: Costume designer; historian
- Notable work: The Book of Costume (1948)

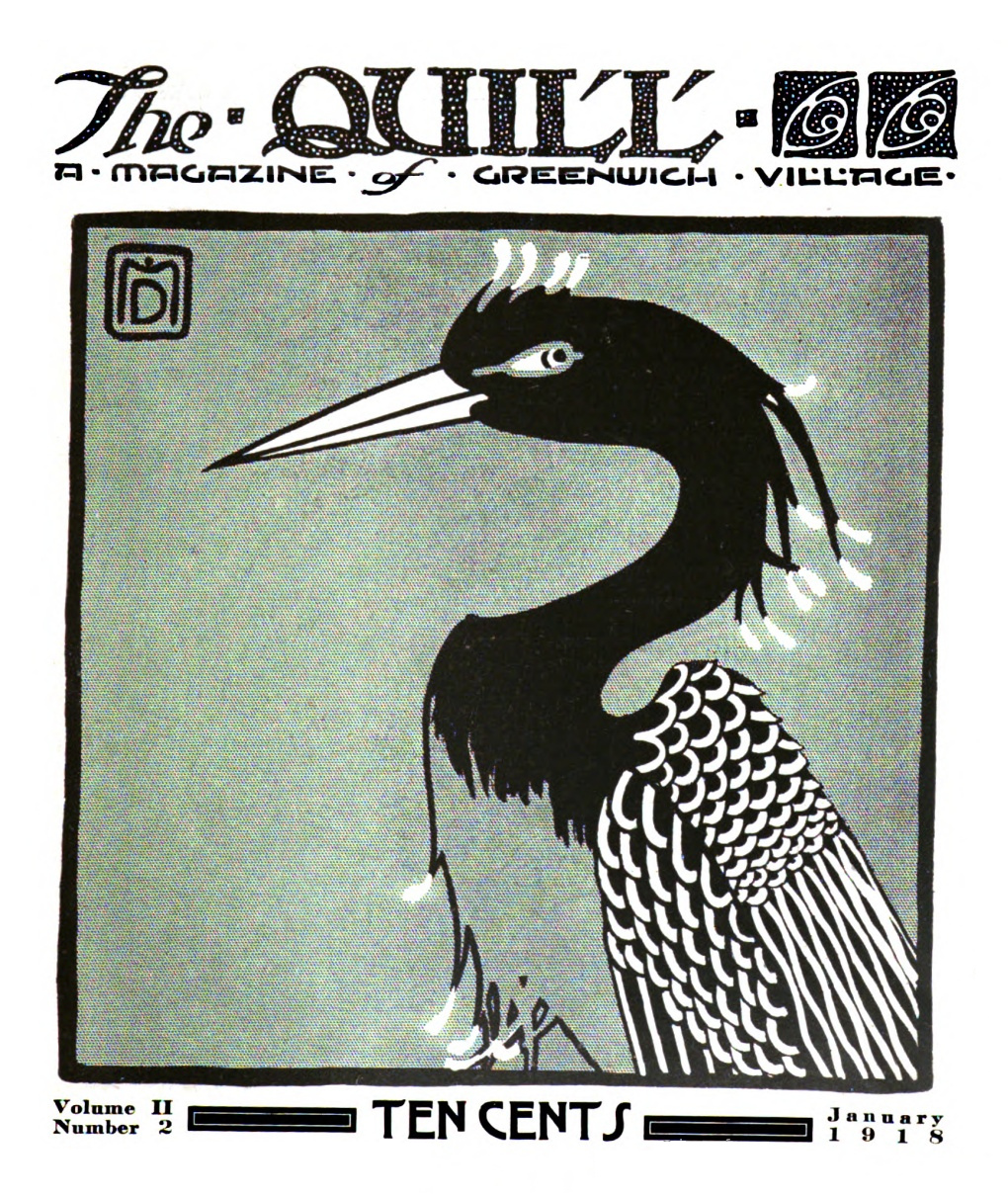
Millia Davenport cover illustration for The Quill (January 1918); her stylized "MD" signature mark is in the top left corner.

Millia Crotty Davenport (March 30, 1895 – January 18, 1992) was an American costumer, theater designer, and scholar, known for her 1948 work The Book of Costume.

== Biography ==
Millia Davenport was born March 30, 1895, in Cambridge, Massachusetts, to biologists Charles and Gertrude Davenport, who became leaders of the American eugenics movement. She studied in Paris as a teenager, returning to New York where she graduated from Huntington High School in 1913 and attended Barnard College from 1913 to 1915. She studied at the Parsons School of Design from 1917 to 1918, and later taught there.

She married editor Arthur Harold Moss in her early twenties and for a time was editor and publisher of The Quill, a Greenwich Village literary magazine.

In the 1920s she married Walter Louis Fleisher, and in the late 1930s married a third time to physician Edward Harkevy. In 1947 she declined an offer from Orson Welles to design costumes for his film production of Macbeth in order to focus on her academic research, culminating in The Book of Costume.

In the early 1960s she founded and cataloged the library of the American Museum of Folk Art.

In 1981 Davenport received the highest honor given by the United States Institute for Theatre Technology, for a lifetime of distinguished contribution to the performing arts. That same year she was awarded an honorary doctorate from the Parsons School of Design.

Davenport's work may be found in the collection of the National Gallery of Art.

She died January 18, 1992, aged 96, at a nursing home minutes away from her longtime home in New City, New York, which she designed and built.

== Legacy ==
In 1991 the Costume Society of America established the Millia Davenport Publication Award recognizing excellence in costume scholarship.
