= Heredity in Relation to Eugenics =

1911 book by Charles Davenport

Heredity in Relation to Eugenics is a book by American eugenicist Charles Benedict Davenport, published in 1911. It argued that many human traits were genetically inherited, and that it would therefore be possible to selectively breed people for desirable traits to improve the human race. It was printed and published with money and support of the Carnegie Institution. The book was widely used as a text for medical schools in the United States and abroad.

In its time, the book was a success and became one of the most influential books in the early-20th century eugenics movement in the United States.

The book was blamed by some for contributing to widespread eugenic sterilization programs in the United States and to the racist policies of Nazi Germany and Hitler.
