= Brookside (Upper Nyack, New York) =

Historic house in New York, United States

- U.S. National Register of Historic Places
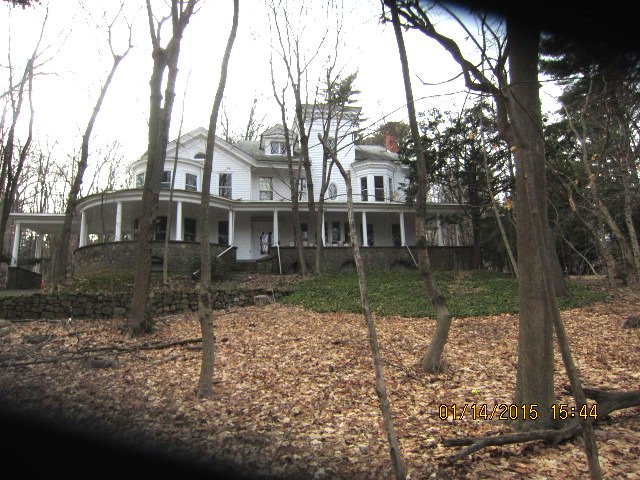
- Brookside-Lochbourn, February 2015

- Location within New York Location within the United States
- Location: 406 N. Broadway, Upper Nyack, New York
- Coordinates: 41°06′20″N 73°55′05″W
- Area: 2.18 acres (0.88 ha)
- Built: c. 1865, c. 1890
- Architectural style: Italian Villa, Colonial Revival
- NRHP reference No.: 12000408
- Added to NRHP: July 10, 2012

Brookside, also known as Lochburn, is a historic home located at Upper Nyack, Rockland County, New York. It was built about 1865, as a 2 1/2-story Italian Villa style frame residence. It was enlarged and modified about 1890 and Colonial Revival style design elements were added. The house features a three-story tower, sweeping verandah, and porte cochere. Also on the property is a large carriage house (c. 1890).

It was listed on the National Register of Historic Places in 2012.
