= Upper Nyack, New York =

- Village
- Location in Rockland County and the state of New York.

- Location within the state of New York
- Coordinates: 41°6′28″N 73°55′21″W
- Country: United States
- State: New York
- County: Rockland
- Town: Clarkstown
- Incorporated: 1872

Government
  - Mayor: Karen A. Tarapata
  - Deputy Mayor: Michael Esmay
  - Trustee: Kennon Rothchild III
  - Trustee: Jeffrey M. Epstein
  - Trustee: Aimee Giovine

Area
  - Total: 4.37 sq mi (11.33 km^{2})
  - Land: 1.23 sq mi (3.18 km^{2})
  - Water: 3.15 sq mi (8.15 km^{2})
- Elevation: 190 ft (58 m)

Population (2020)
  - Total: 2,015
  - Density: 1,640.4/sq mi (633.35/km^{2})
- Time zone: UTC-5 (Eastern (EST))
  - Summer (DST): UTC-4 (EDT)
- ZIP code: 10960
- Area code: 845
- FIPS code: 36-76386
- GNIS feature ID: 0968288
- Website: http://uppernyack-ny.us/

Upper Nyack (pronounced /ˈnaɪæk/, NY-ak) is a village incorporated in 1872 in the town of Clarkstown, Rockland County, New York, United States. It is located north of the village of Nyack, east of Valley Cottage, south of Rockland Lake State Park, and west of the Hudson River. As of the 2020 census, Upper Nyack had a population of 2,015.

Upper Nyack has a Village Hall and a village law court, located in the same building on North Broadway. Upper Nyack is also home to the Empire Hook and Ladder Company No. 1, established in 1863, one of eight fire companies in the Nyack Joint Fire District.

== History ==
Upper Nyack was incorporated in 1872. Two hundred years prior, Claus Jansen Purarent of Bergen Township (now Jersey City) received a patent from Governor Phillip Carteret for 640 acres (260 ha) of land north of Tappan. Jansen sold 100 acres (40 ha) to Dowe Harmensen Tallman, and the rest was inherited by his son Cornelius Clausen, who assumed the surname of Kuyper (Cooper). Kuyper was an outstanding public servant in the County of Orange. The first Upper Nyacker also commanded the first company of militia in the county. He died in 1731 and is buried in the Upper Nyack Burial Grounds.

Following the extension of the Northern Railroad of New Jersey into the area in the mid-19th century, rapid growth ensued. Town government no longer being seen as an effective means of dealing with the needs of Nyack proper, village incorporation was discussed. Fearing higher taxes, those in what would have become the northern part of Nyack village formed their own municipal corporation first, named Upper Nyack. Nyack village still incorporated, too, although without this northern portion.

In 1909, the village was known locally as "Goosetown", probably due to a Colonel Vose, who lived on Highmount Avenue and kept geese which he drove daily down to the river, thus giving the thought that Upper Nyack was full of/for the birds. The slogan "Goosetown against the world" was adopted in 1909 due to a local dispute. During the celebration of Upper Nyack's Centennial in 1972, Upper Nyackers proudly displayed bumper stickers again with the words "GOOSETOWN AGAINST THE WORLD".

== Geography ==
The village is on the west bank of the Hudson River, a mile north of where the Tappan Zee Bridge carries the New York State Thruway to Tarrytown, New York.

According to the United States Census Bureau, the village has a total area of 4.4 square miles (11.3 km^{2}), of which 1.2 square miles (3.2 km^{2}) is land and 3.1 square miles (8.1 km^{2}), or 72.01%, is water.

== Demographics ==
Historical population
Census	Pop.	Note	%±
1880	412		—
1890	668		62.1%
1900	516		−22.8%
1910	591		14.5%
1920	538		−9.0%
1930	842		56.5%
1940	924		9.7%
1950	1,195		29.3%
1960	1,833		53.4%
1970	2,096		14.3%
1980	1,906		−9.1%
1990	2,084		9.3%
2000	1,863		−10.6%
2010	2,063		10.7%
2020	2,015		−2.3%
U.S. Decennial Census

As of the census of 2000, there were 1,863 people, 712 households, and 524 families residing in the village. The population density was 1,406.8 inhabitants per square mile (543.2/km^{2}). There were 732 housing units at an average density of 552.7 per square mile (213.4/km^{2}). The racial makeup of the village was 92.54% White, 3.33% African American, 0.05% Native American, 2.31% Asian, 0.43% from other races, and 1.34% from two or more races. Hispanic or Latino of any race were 4.13% of the population.

There were 712 households, out of which 31.5% had children under the age of 18 living with them, 64.3% were married couples living together, 6.5% had a female householder with no husband present, and 26.4% were non-families. 21.9% of all households were made up of individuals, and 9.8% had someone living alone who was 65 years of age or older. The average household size was 2.58 and the average family size was 3.01.

In the village, the population was spread out, with 22.1% under the age of 18, 4.1% from 18 to 24, 24.2% from 25 to 44, 33.9% from 45 to 64, and 15.6% who were 65 years of age or older. The median age was 45 years. For every 100 females, there were 92.1 males. For every 100 females age 18 and over, there were 86.3 males.

The median income for a household in the village was $91,156, and the median income for a family was $103,049. Males had a median income of $66,607 versus $41,406 for females. The per capita income for the village was $52,368. About 2.4% of families and 3.4% of the population were below the poverty line, including 0.8% of those under age 18 and 6.6% of those age 65 or over.

== Tourism ==
=== Historical markers ===
- Old Palmer Burying Ground - 104 Old Mountain Road
- Old Stone Church - 347 North Broadway

=== Landmarks and places of interest ===
- Brookside (Upper Nyack, New York) - (NRHP)
- Old Stone Church, 347 North Broadway - Built 1813-4 of native stone and hand-hewn timbers by members of the Methodist Episcopal Church, this is county's oldest church building. It is now owned by the Village of Upper Nyack. (NRHP)
- Hook Mountain State Park - Early Dutch settlers called Hook Mountain Verdrietige Hook ("Tedious Point"). It is said to be the site of the final local Indian encampment. It is registered as a National Natural Landmark along with adjacent Nyack Beach State Park.
- Nyack Beach State Park
- Shadowcliff - (NRHP)
- Upper Nyack Firehouse, 330 North Broadway - (NRHP)
- Van Houten's Landing Historic District - (NRHP)
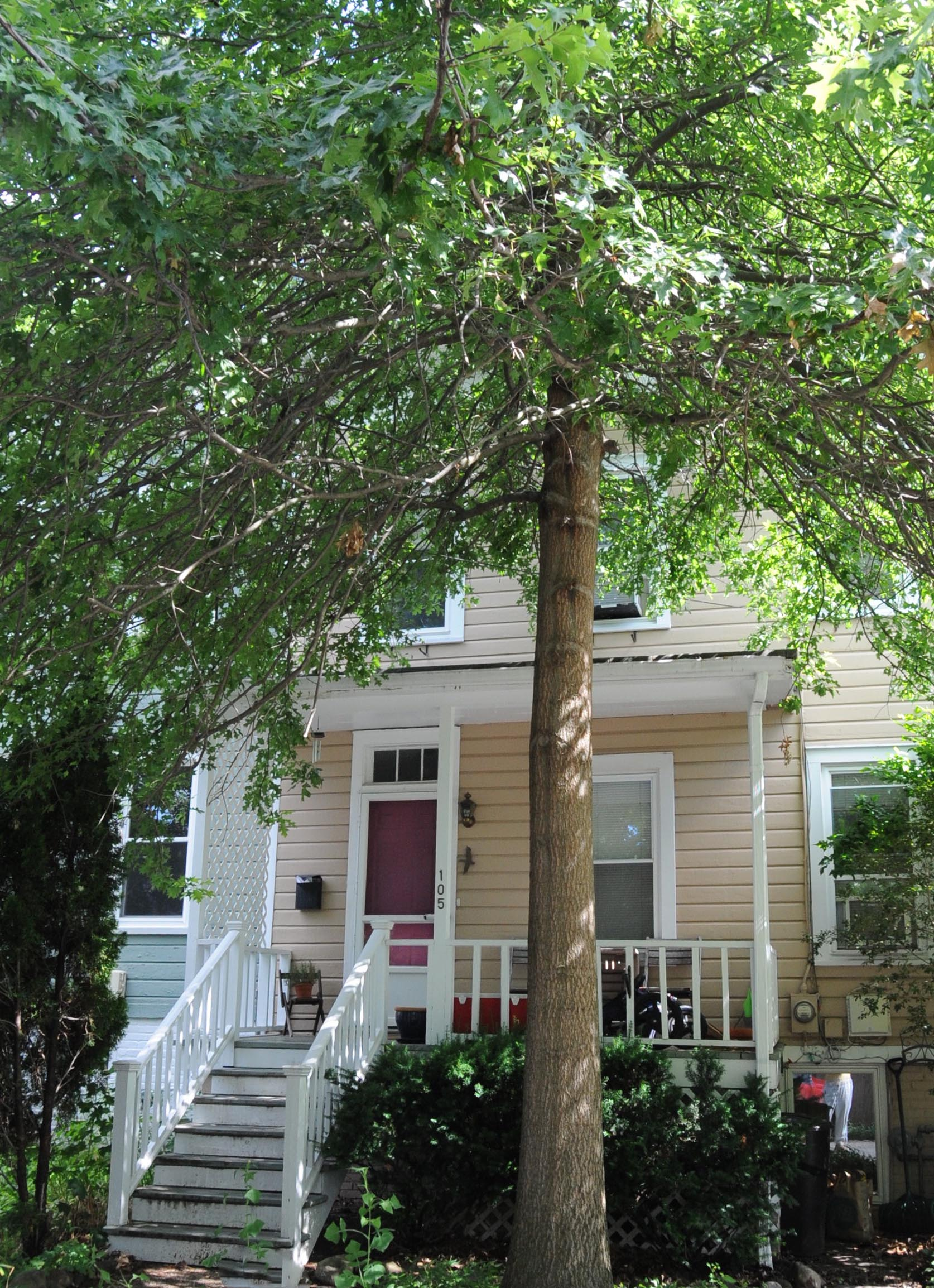
Van Houten's Landing Historic District

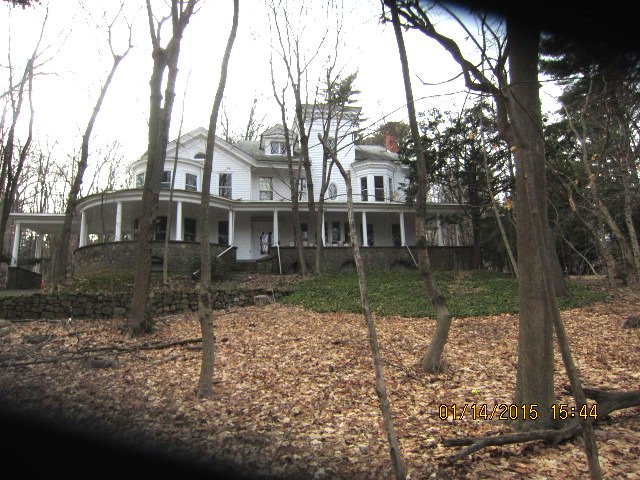
Brookside, one of the grand old estates

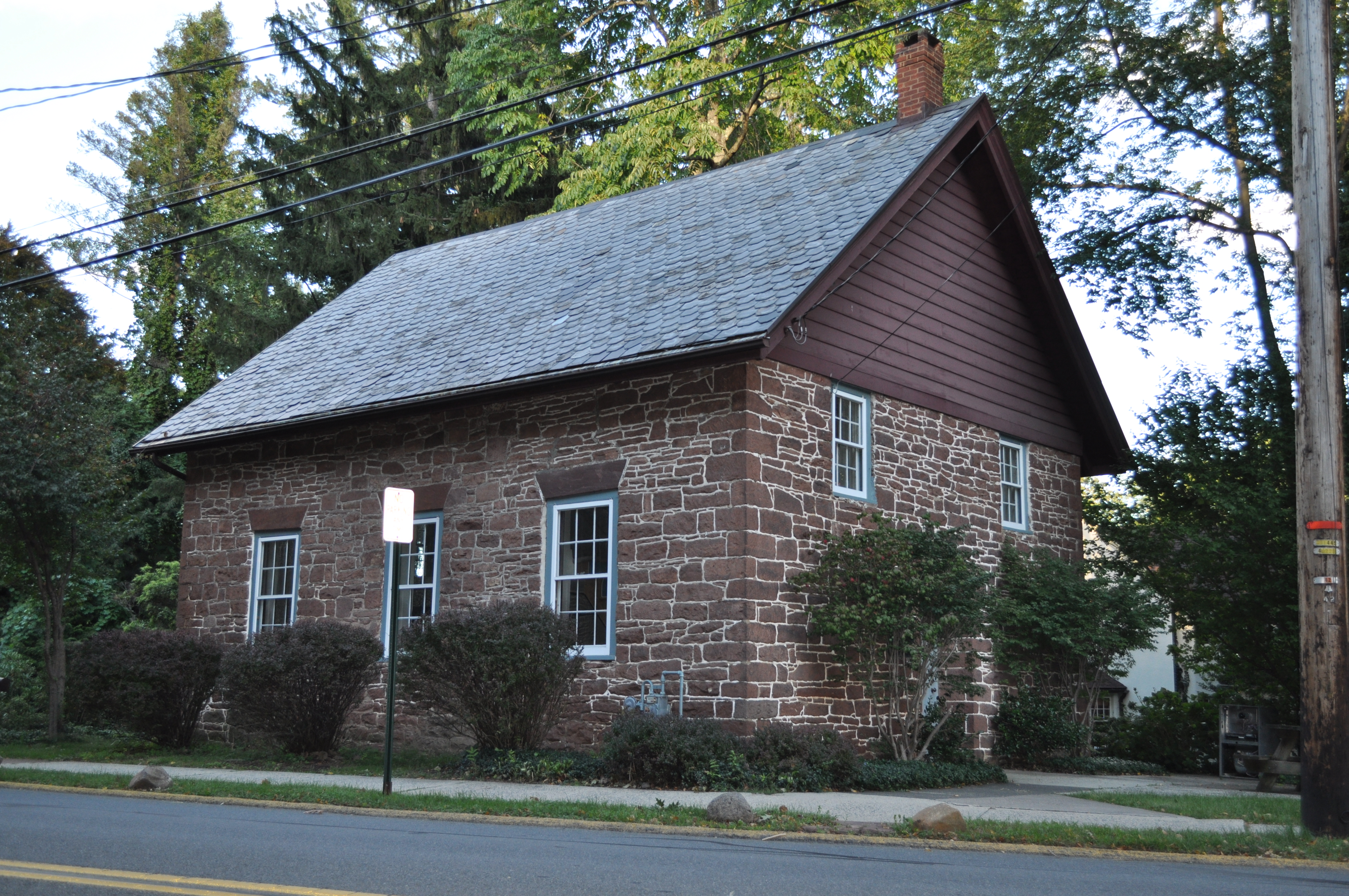
The Old Stone Church, as the locals call it

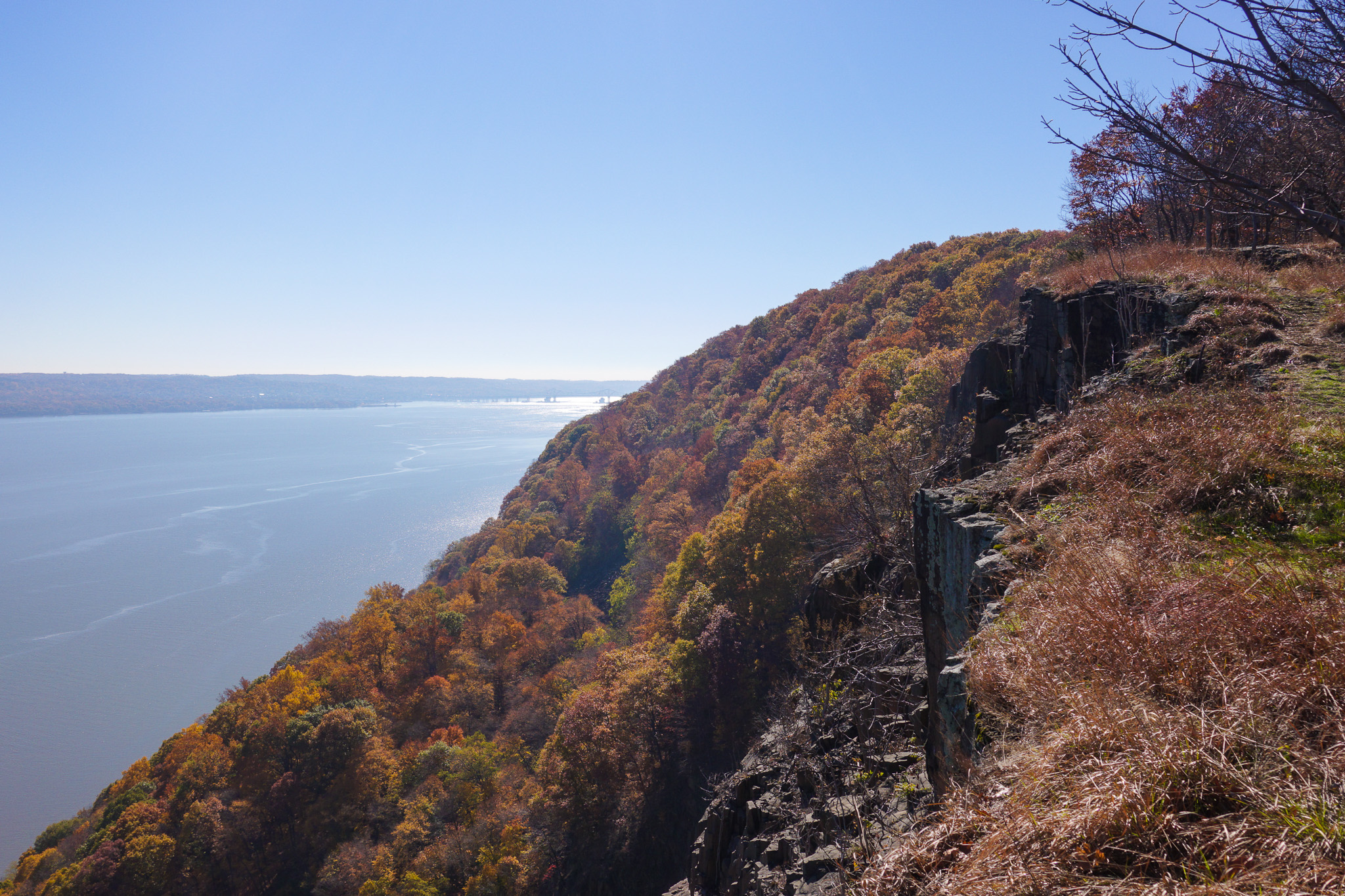
Hook Mountain, looming over the river

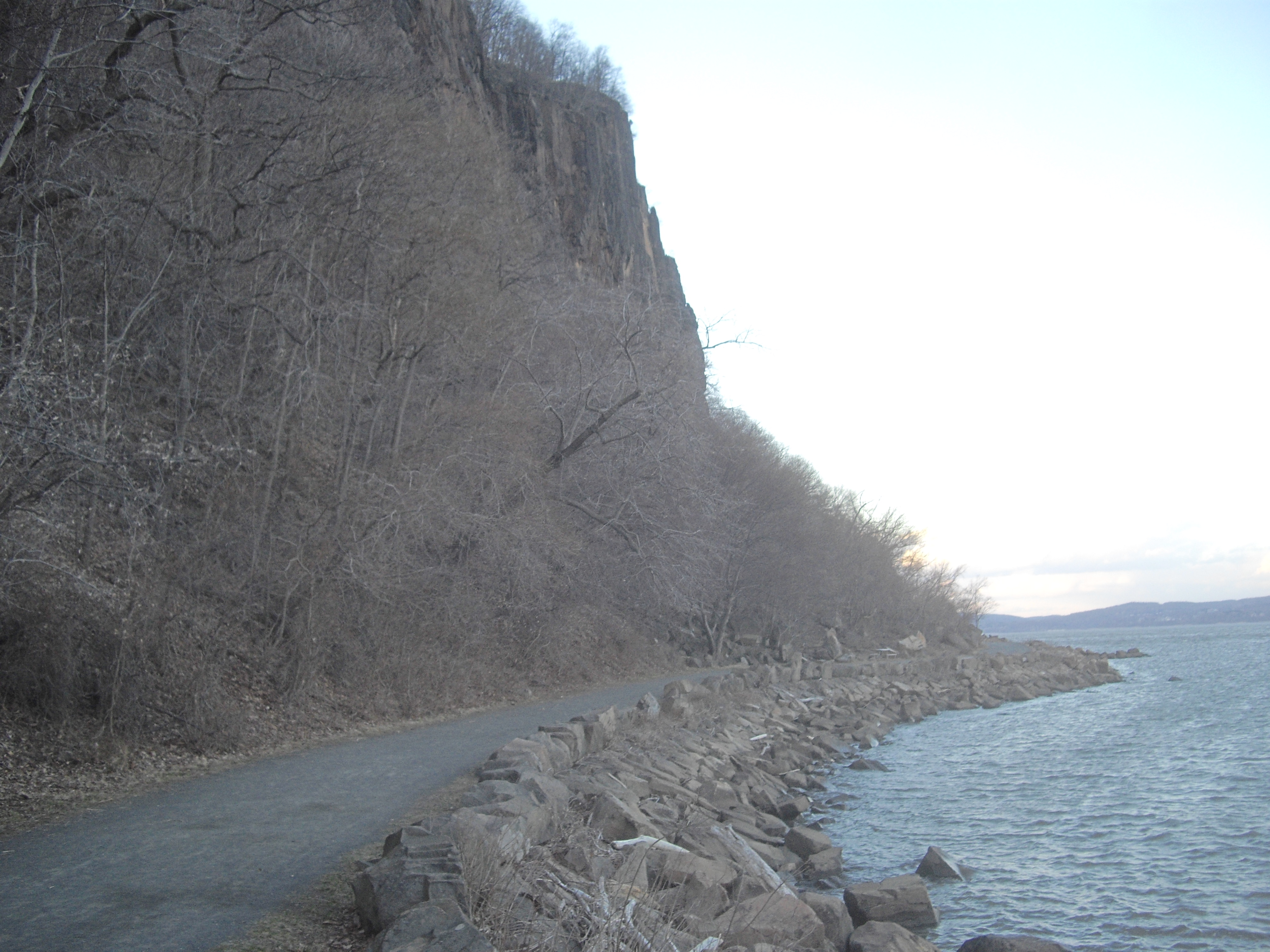
Nyack Beach State Park

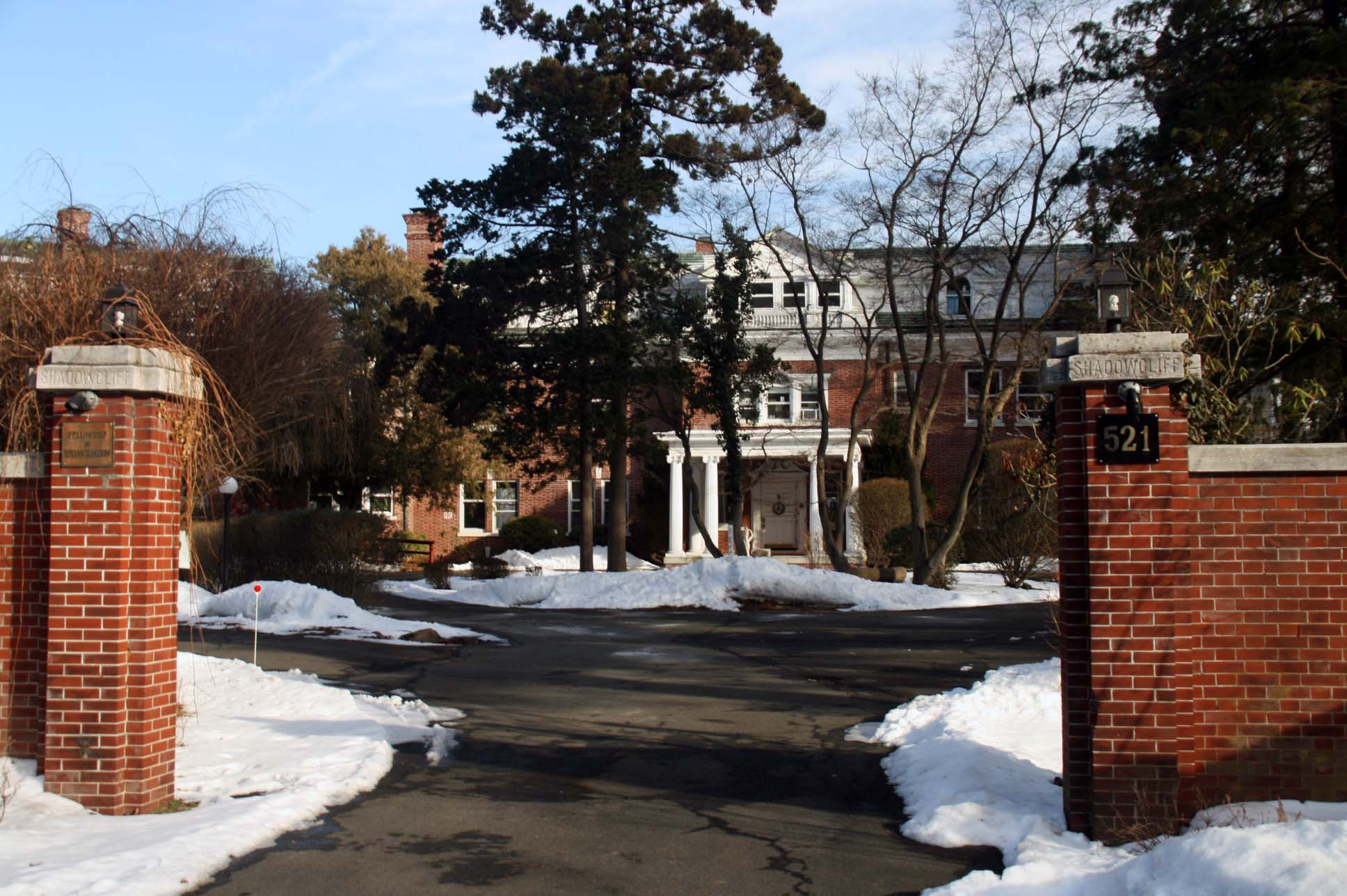
Shadowcliff, once home to the Fellowship of Reconciliation

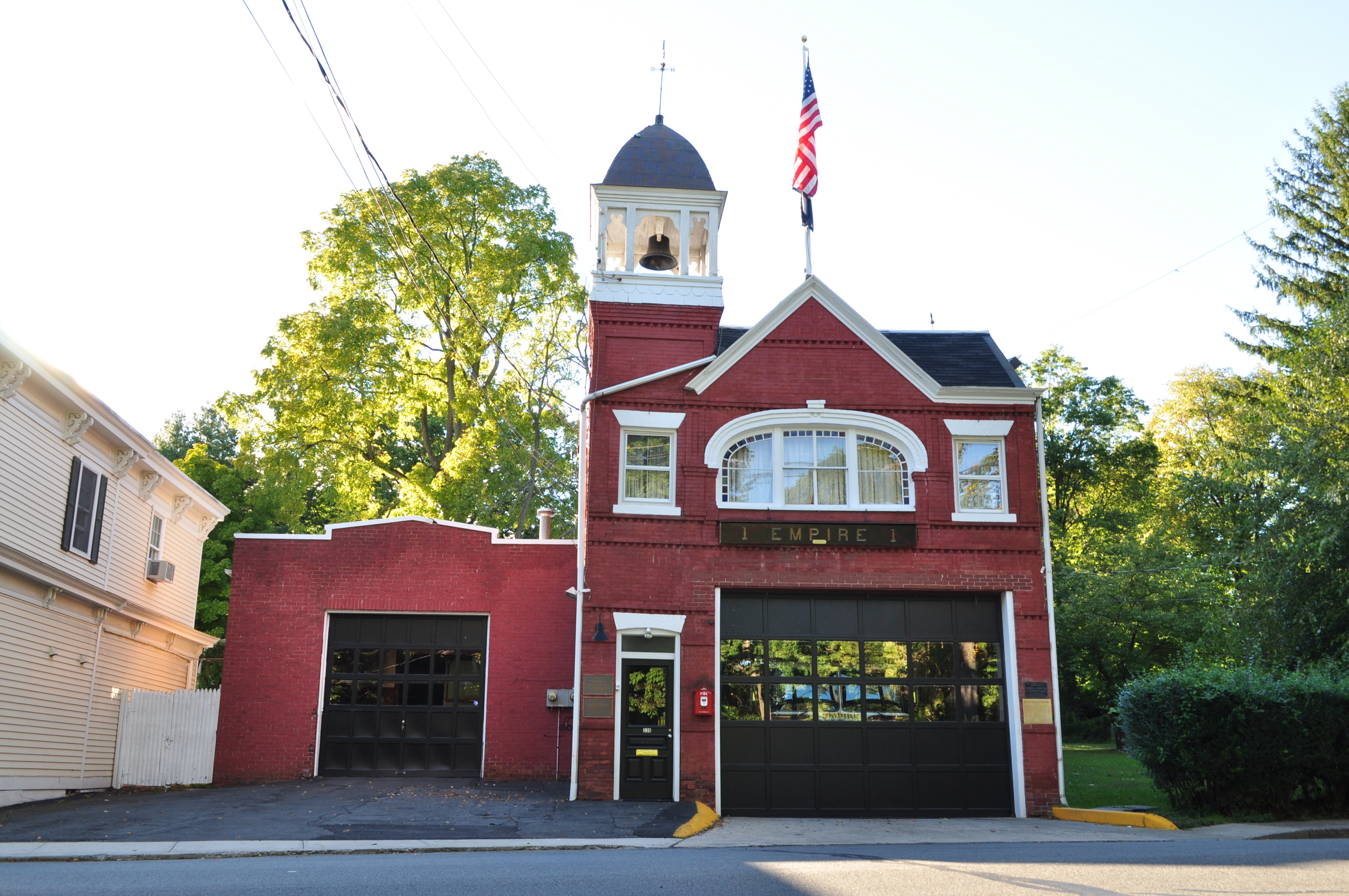
The Upper Nyack firehouse

== Notable people ==
- June Shagaloff Alexander, civil rights activist.
- Dave Breger, cartoonist.
- Adam Chanler-Berat, actor.
- Gertrude Crotty Davenport (1866–1946), zoologist, died in Upper Nyack.
- Edward Hopper, painter and printmaker.
- Norman Rose, actor and narrator.
