= Shadowcliff =

Historic house in New York, United States

- U.S. National Register of Historic Places
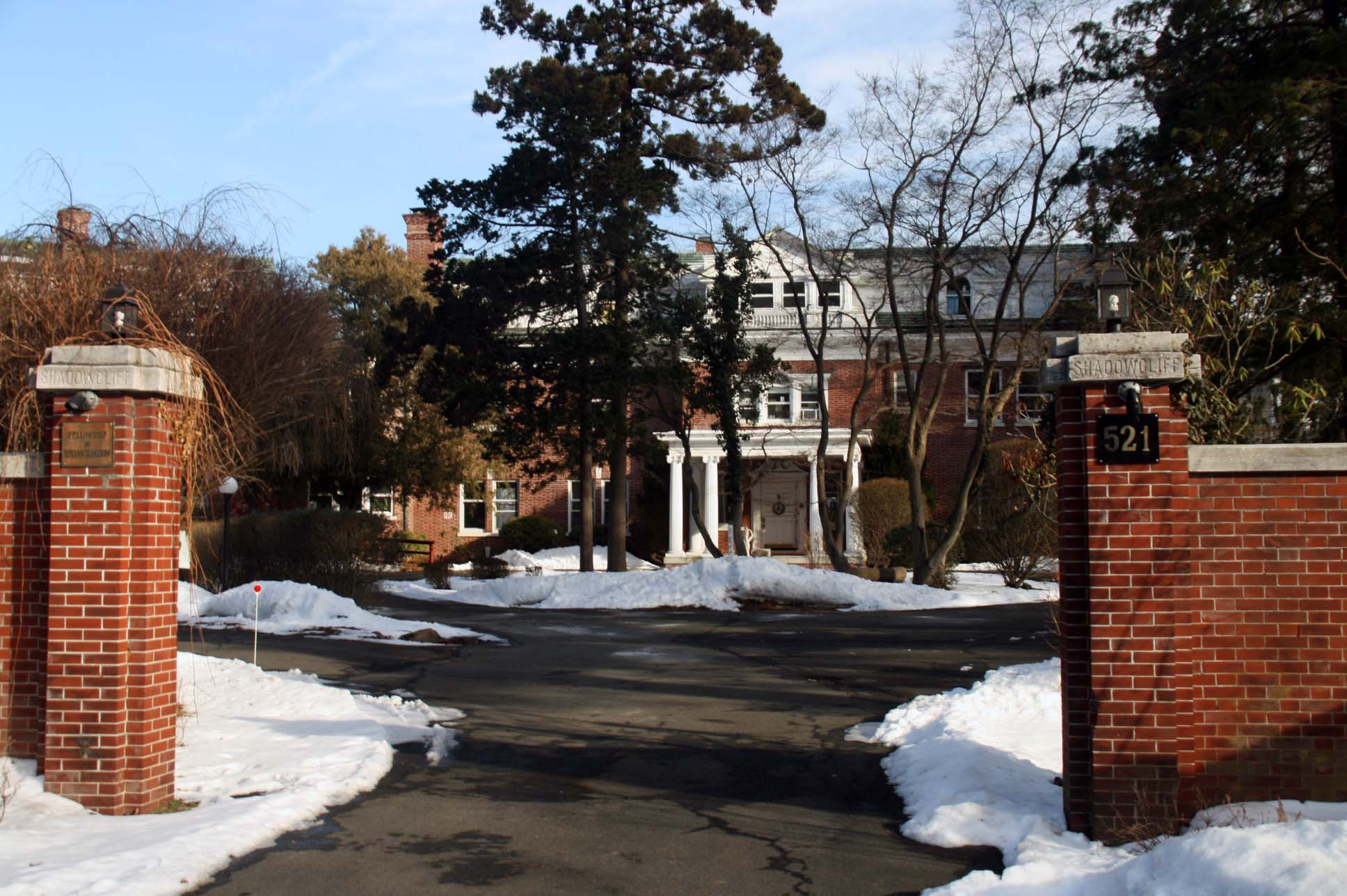

- Location within New York Location within the United States
- Location: 521 N. Broadway, Upper Nyack, New York
- Coordinates: 41°06′32″N 73°55′06″W
- Area: 1.62 acres (0.66 ha)
- Built: 1921
- Architectural style: Classical Revival
- NRHP reference No.: 14000131
- Added to NRHP: April 7, 2014

Shadowcliff, also known as the Fellowship of Reconciliation Headquarters, is a historic home located at Upper Nyack, Rockland County, New York. It was built in 1921, and is a large two-story, Classical Revival style masonry dwelling. The 44-room residence features three porticoes, Palladian windows, and has a clay tile roof. It has housed the headquarters of the Fellowship of Reconciliation since 1957.

It was listed on the National Register of Historic Places in 2014.
