= Morris Steggerda =

American anthropologist (1900–1950)

- Born: September 1, 1900 Holland, Michigan
- Died: March 15, 1950 (aged 49)
- Occupation: Physical anthropologist
- Education: PhD Zoology
- Alma mater: University of Illinois
- Years active: 1928–1950
- Spouse: Inez Steggerda

Morris Steggerda (September 1, 1900 – March 15, 1950) was an American physical anthropologist, who served as assistant professor of zoology at Smith College (1928-1930) and professor of anthropology at Hartford Seminary Foundation (1944–1950). Between professorships, Steggerda worked closely with Charles Davenport, a biologist and eugenicist, during his time at the Carnegie Institution of Washington at Cold Spring Harbor Laboratory. He worked primarily on Central American and Caribbean Black and native populations.

== Life and career ==
Steggerda was born in Holland, Michigan, the son of Sena (Ter Vree) and John Steggerda. He was of Dutch descent. He received an A.B. from Hope College in 1922, and an A.M. and Ph.D. from the Department of Zoology of the University of Illinois, in 1923 and 1928 respectively. He met his wife, Inez Steggerda, in 1928 while teaching at Smith College (1928–30), but most of his career was spent as an investigator with the Carnegie Institution for Science at Cold Spring Harbor, New York (1930–44). From then until his death of a heart attack on March 15, 1950, he was professor of anthropology at Hartford Seminary Foundation in Connecticut.

He was a member of many scientific organizations including the American Zoological Society, the American Society of Naturalists, and the Eugenics Research Association, as well as an honorary member of the Eugenics Society. He was also a council member of the American Anthropological Association. He was a founding member of the American Association of Physical Anthropologists in 1930, and subsequently served on its executive committee and as its vice president.

Steggerda's academic biography and complete list of publications was published in the American Journal of Physical Anthropology Vol. 9 N.S., No. 1, March 1951. Much of his research revolved around anthropometry in which measurements are taken of the human body. He worked mainly with living beings and his clear racial and specifically eugenic approach to human diversity and work with other eugenicists had been criticized and never resulted in change to his methods. For example, his work on the Tuskegee eugenics project that he worked on with Davenport in which Steggerda took the measurements of students of Alabama’s Tuskegee Institute based in racial typology and trying to prove that there are hereditary differences between races. Together, Davenport and Steggerda also wrote Race Crossing in Jamaica, published in 1929. Today his research is widely considered to be racist, particularly in regards to miscegenation, and widely influenced Nazi German eugenics practices.

The corpus of his research materials formed the basis for an ethnographic research project in the 1990s directed by Quetzil Castaneda. The materials were curated in an interactive exhibition for the community to engage in the town hall over a three-day period.

== Academic work ==
Some of his work was done in collaboration with the eugenicist Charles Davenport, with whom he wrote the book Race Crossing in Jamaica, published in 1929.

Despite his clear racial and specifically eugenic approach to human diversity, Steggerda was a bit different in interpretive outlook than his Davenport. While Davenport converted the slightest bit of data or non-data into racial ideology, Steggerda was exceptionally circumspect. He was methodical and precise and did not make interpretations that exceeded the methods and data employed in his research. No doubt this is one aspect to the collaboration between Steggerda and Davenport: Steggerda did the methodical work and Davenport did the interpretive eisegesis of racial "hybridization".

== Publications ==
=== Books ===
- Steggerda, Morris. Physical development of negro-white hybrids in Jamaica, British West Indies. University of Illinois, 1928.
- Steggerda, Morris, and Charles Benedict Davenport. Race Crossing in Jamaica. Carnegie Institution of Washington Publication 395. 1929. OCLC 489049898
- Steggerda, Morris. Anthropometry of Adult Maya Indians: A Study of Their Physical and Physiological Characteristics. Carnegie Institution of Washington Publication 434. 1932.
- Steggerda, Morris. Maya Indians of Yucatán. Carnegie Institution of Washington Publication 531. 1941. OCLC 616357. Reprint, New York: AMS Pr. 1984. ISBN 978-0-404-16283-2

Steggerda's complete list of publications was published in the American Journal of Physical Anthropology Vol. 9 N.S., No. 1, March 1951. He published several dozen articles in journals such as Eugenical News, American Journal of Physical Anthropology, Journal of Comparative Psychology, American Journal of Physiology, Ecology, Poultry Science, Plant Physiology, American Dietitic, Science, Nature, and the Proceedings of the American Academy of Arts and Sciences.
