= Long-chain-aldehyde dehydrogenase =

Protein-coding gene in the species Homo sapiens

ALDH3A2

Identifiers
- Aliases: ALDH3A2, aldehyde dehydrogenase 3 family, member A2, ALDH10, FALDH, SLS, aldehyde dehydrogenase 3 family member A2
- External IDs: OMIM: 609523; MGI: 1353452; GeneCards: ALDH3A2
Available structures
PDB	Ortholog search: PDBe RCSB
PDB	List of PDB id codes 4QGK
Enzyme activity
EC #	BRENDA	ExPASy	KEGG	MetaCyc
1.2.1.3	↗	↗	↗	↗
1.2.1.94	↗	↗	↗	↗

Gene location (Human)
Chr.	Chromosome 17 (human)
Band	17p11.2	Start	19,648,136 bp
Band	17p11.2	End	19,685,760 bp

Gene location (Mouse)
Chr.	Chromosome 11 (mouse)
Band	11 B2|11 37.96 cM	Start	61,114,243 bp
Band	11 B2|11 37.96 cM	End	61,158,290 bp
RNA expression pattern
Bgee	Human / Mouse (ortholog); Top expressed in: right adrenal cortex; left adrenal gland; left adrenal cortex; skin of thigh; skin of hip; skin of abdomen; hair follicle; kidney tubule; nipple; skin of arm / Top expressed in: right kidney; left lobe of liver; gastrula; granulocyte; mucous cell of stomach; lacrimal gland; decidua; duodenum; yolk sac; gallbladder; More reference expression data
BioGPS	n/a
Gene ontology
Molecular function	long-chain-aldehyde dehydrogenase activity; long-chain-alcohol oxidase activity; medium-chain-aldehyde dehydrogenase activity; oxidoreductase activity; aldehyde dehydrogenase (NAD+) activity; oxidoreductase activity, acting on the aldehyde or oxo group of donors, NAD or NADP as acceptor; protein binding; protein homodimerization activity; glyceraldehyde-3-phosphate dehydrogenase (NAD+) (non-phosphorylating) activity; 3-chloroallyl aldehyde dehydrogenase activity
Cellular component	integral component of membrane; endoplasmic reticulum membrane; membrane; intracellular membrane-bounded organelle; peroxisome; endoplasmic reticulum; peroxisomal membrane; organelle membrane
Biological process	peripheral nervous system development; sesquiterpenoid metabolic process; phytol metabolic process; sphingolipid biosynthetic process; cellular aldehyde metabolic process; central nervous system development; epidermis development; metabolism; fatty acid alpha-oxidation; hexadecanal metabolic process; lipid metabolism; fatty acid metabolic process
Sources:Amigo / QuickGO
Orthologs
Databases	NCBI: entry; OMA: entry
Species	Human	Mouse
Entrez	224	11671
Ensembl	ENSG00000072210	ENSMUSG00000010025
UniProt	P51648	P47740
RefSeq (mRNA)	NM_000382; NM_001031806; NM_001369136; NM_001369137; NM_001369138 NM_001369139; NM_001369146; NM_001369148	NM_007437; NM_001331114; NM_001331115
RefSeq (protein)	NP_000373; NP_001026976; NP_001356065; NP_001356066; NP_001356067 NP_001356068; NP_001356075; NP_001356077	NP_001318043; NP_001318044; NP_031463
Location (UCSC)	Chr 17: 19.65 – 19.69 Mb	Chr 11: 61.11 – 61.16 Mb
PubMed search
- Wikidata
View/Edit Human	View/Edit Mouse

Fatty aldehyde dehydrogenase (or long-chain-aldehyde dehydrogenase) is an aldehyde dehydrogenase enzyme that in human is encoded in the ALDH3A2 gene on chromosome 17. Aldehyde dehydrogenase enzymes function to remove toxic aldehydes that are generated by the metabolism of alcohol and by lipid peroxidation.

== Structure ==
ALDH3A2 belongs to the aldehyde dehydrogenase superfamily and is a membrane-associated protein typically containing 485 residues. The mature protein functions as a dimer. The structure was resolved using X-ray crystallography at 2.1 Angstrom resolution. It contains an element in the C-terminal region referred to as a "gatekeeper" helix, which is adjacent to the membrane-anchored transmembrane domain and the catalytic core. The gatekeeper helix appears to control access of molecular substrates to the catalytic core and allows efficient transit between membranes and catalytic sites.

== Function ==
ALDH3A2 catalyzes the oxidation of long-chain aliphatic aldehydes into fatty acids. It is known to act on a variety of both saturated and unsaturated aliphatic aldehydes between 6 and 24 carbons in length, as well as dihydrophytal, a 20-carbon branched chain aldehyde. It requires NAD+ as a co-factor. The encoded enzyme is responsible for conversion of the sphingosine 1-phosphate (S1P) degradation product hexadecenal to hexadecenoic acid. ALD3H2 is expressed in the human liver and has been found to localize the microsome fraction inside the cell.

At least two alternative splicing isoforms of ALDH3A2 are known to exist. The alternative transcript differs by an additional exon and anchors differently to the endoplasmic reticulum vs. the peroxisome

== Clinical significance ==
Mutations and deletions within the ALDH3A2 gene have been widely associated with the autosomal recessive Sjögren-Larsson syndrome, an autosomal recessive neurocutaneous disease. Multiple mutations have been found in different families, including those that molecularly disrupts the protein dimerization interface or reduces mRNA stability. Absence or insufficiency of ALDH3A2 protein products in mutant cells are known to cause abnormal metabolism of sphingosine 1-phosphate to ether-linked glycerolipids and the abnormal accumulation of lipid precursors.
