= Heredity Commission =

The Heredity Commission was a eugenic advisory group to the government of the United States of America during the early 20th century. It was founded in 1906 by Willet M. Hays (1), Assistant Secretary of Agriculture and president and founder of the American Breeders' Association (ABA)

Hays selected scientists who were members of the ABA. The purpose of the commission was "to investigate all proper means" of influencing heredity to "better the race". It aimed to increase "families of good blood" and to discourage the "vicious elements in the cross-bred American civilization." The commission was also asked to study if "a new species of human being could be consciously evolved."

== Note ==
1. The name of the Assistant Secretary of Agriculture is listed as William Hayes by the 1906 New York Times article.
