= Marinesco–Sjögren syndrome =

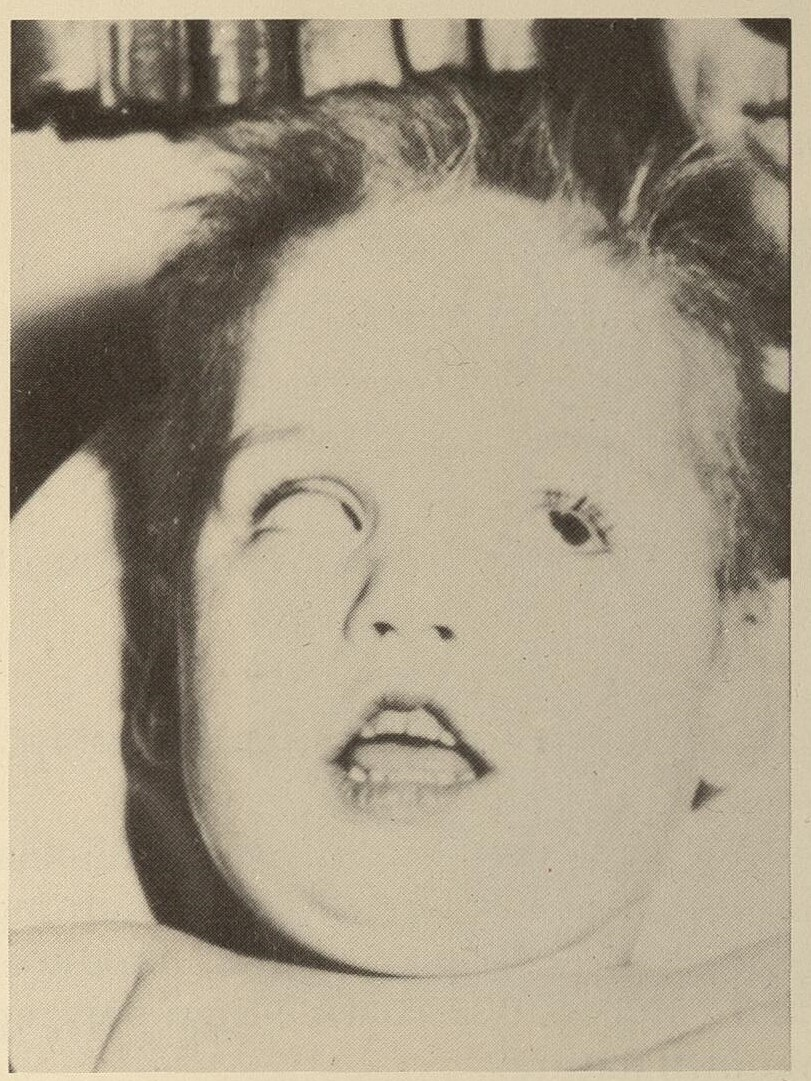
- Child with Marinesco–Sjögren syndrome
- Specialty: Neurology, medical genetics
- Frequency: 0.0001%

Marinesco–Sjögren syndrome (MSS), sometimes spelled Marinescu–Sjögren syndrome, is a rare autosomal recessive disorder.

== Presentation ==
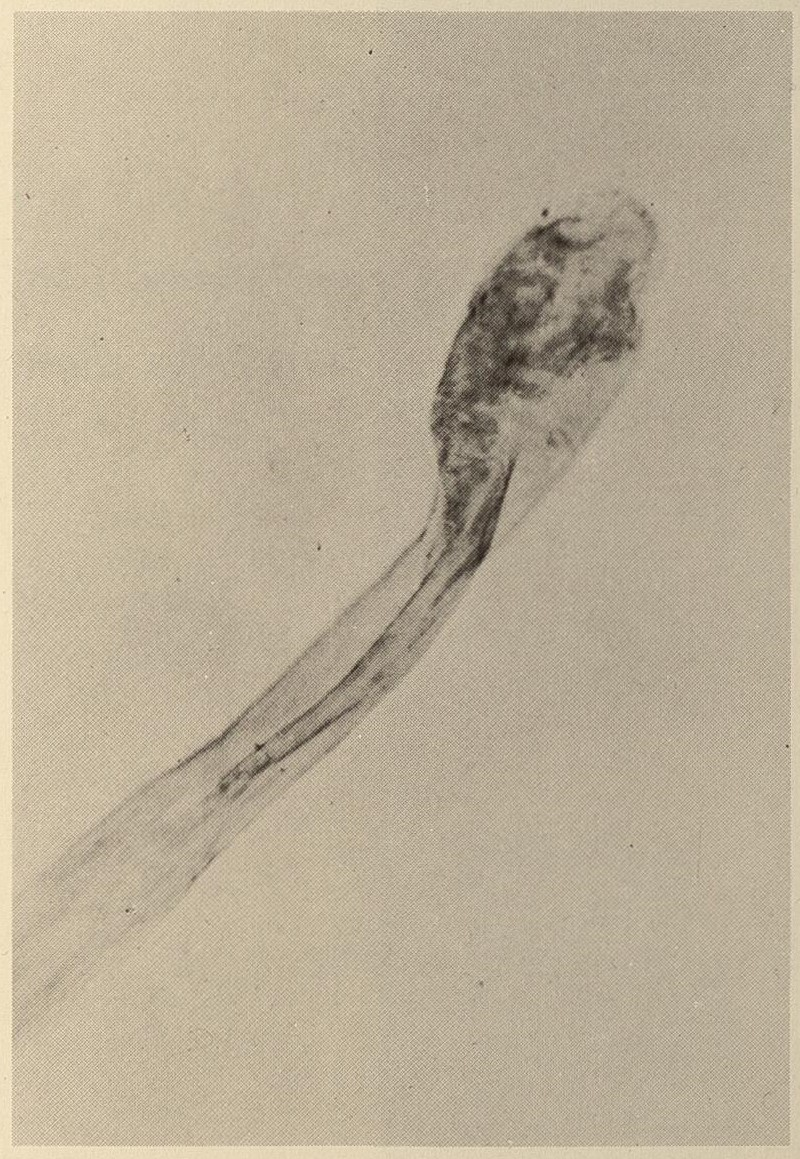
Hair in Marinesco–Sjögren syndrome, showing lack of pigment and medulla

The syndrome causes cerebellar ataxia (balance and coordination problems), intellectual disability, congenital cataracts in early childhood, muscle weakness, inability to chew food, thin brittle fingernails, and sparse hair.

Small stature, mild to severe intellectual disability and dysarthria (slow, imprecise speech) are usually present. Various skeletal abnormalities (e.g., curvature of the spine) and hypergonadotropic hypogonadism often occur. Muscle weakness is progressive, but life expectancy is near normal.

== Cause ==
Marinesco–Sjögren syndrome can be associated with mutations of the SIL1 gene.

SIL1 gene is located on chromosome 5q31.2

== Diagnosis ==
Diagnosis of MSS is based on clinical symptoms, magnetic resonance imaging (MRI) of the brain (cerebellar atrophy particularly involving the cerebellar vermis), and muscle biopsy.

=== Differential diagnosis ===
DDx includes Congenital Cataracts Facial Dysmorphism Neuropathy (CCFDN), Marinesco–Sjögren like syndrome with chylomicronemia, carbohydrate deficient glycoprotein syndromes, Lowe syndrome, and mitochondrial disease.

Marinesco–Sjögren-like syndrome is a very rare genetic disorder which is characterized by symptoms similar to those shown by people with Marinesco–Sjögren syndrome, the symptoms (of this variant of MSS) being infantile hypotonia, ataxia, cataracts, intellectual disabilities, cerebellar atrophy, myopathic alterations, vascular degeneration, and adipose tissue proliferation.

== Treatment ==
Treatment for MSS is symptomatic and supportive including physical and occupational therapy, speech therapy, and special education. Cataracts must be removed when vision is impaired, generally in the first decade of life. Hormone replacement therapy is needed if hypogonadism is present.

== Epidemiology ==
Members of the MOWA Band of Choctaw Indians, a state-recognized tribe located in southwest Alabama, have a high frequency of Marinesco–Sjögren syndrome and have been the subject of study. They are the only known population in the United States to have this disease.

== Eponym ==
It is named for Gheorghe Marinescu and Torsten Sjögren.

== See also ==
- Skin lesion
- List of cutaneous conditions
