= Charles Davenport =

American biologist and eugenicist (1866–1944)

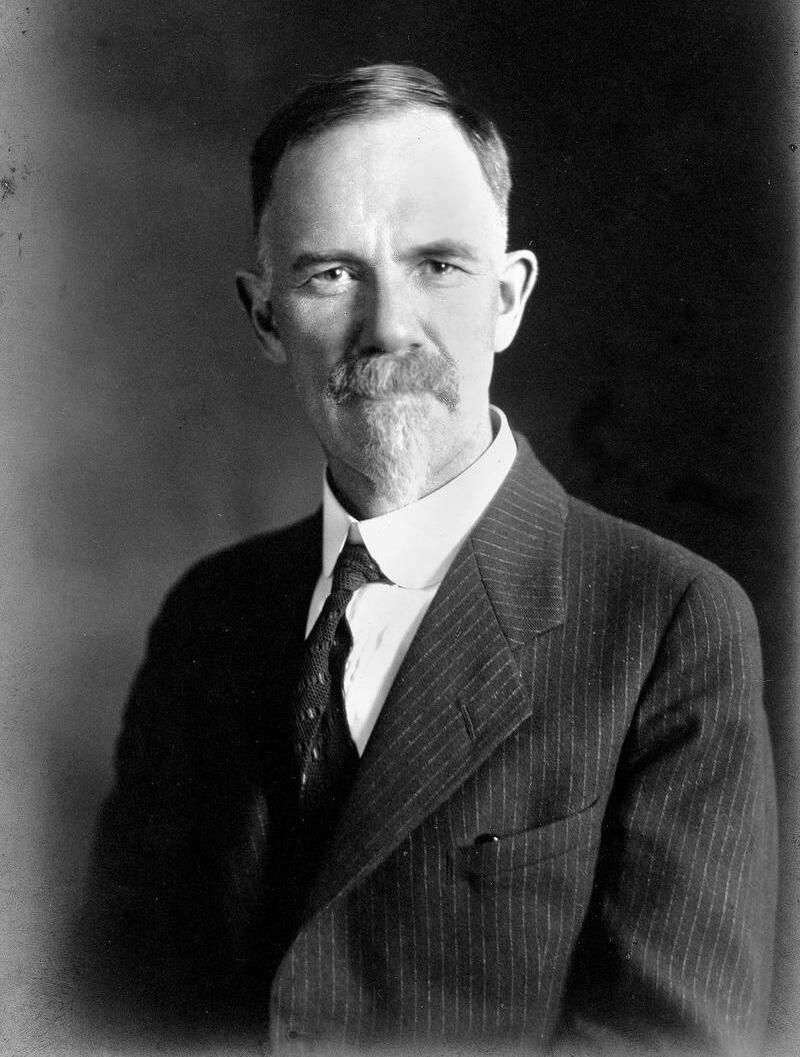
- Davenport in c.1929
- Born: June 1, 1866; Stamford, Connecticut, U.S.
- Died: February 18, 1944 (aged 77); Cold Spring Harbor, New York, U.S.
- Education: Harvard University (AB, PhD)
- Spouse: Gertrude Crotty Davenport
- Children: 3 (including Millia Crotty)
- Scientific career
- Fields: Eugenicist and biologist
- Workplaces: Cold Spring Harbor Laboratory

Charles Benedict Davenport (June 1, 1866 – February 18, 1944) was a biologist and eugenicist influential in the American eugenics movement. He taught at Harvard University and the University of Chicago.

== Early life and education ==
Davenport was born in Stamford, Connecticut on June 1, 1866, to Amzi Benedict Davenport, an abolitionist of Puritan ancestry, and his wife Jane Joralemon Dimon (of English, Dutch and Italian ancestry). Davenport was exceedingly proud of his ancestry, claiming in 1942 that he had been an American "for over three hundred years" because he was "composed of elements that were brought to this country during the 17th century." His father had eleven children by two wives, and Charles grew up with his family on Garden Place in Brooklyn Heights. His mother's strong beliefs tended to rub off onto Charles and he followed her example. During the summer months, Charles and his family spent their time on a family farm near Stamford.

As a young boy, Charles was tutored at home, reflecting his father’s strong Protestant beliefs. His father arranged this education to instill in him the values of hard work and learning. When he was not studying, Charles worked as a janitor and errand boy for his father's business. His father had a significant influence on his early career, as he encouraged Charles to become an engineer. However, this was not his primary interest, and after working for a few years to save up money, Charles enrolled in Harvard College to pursue his genuine interest of becoming a scientist. He graduated with a Bachelor's after two years, and earned a Ph.D. in biology in 1892. He married Gertrude Crotty, a zoology graduate of Harvard with whom he would later collaborate closely, in 1894. He had two daughters with Gertrude, Millia Crotty Davenport and Jane Davenport Harris di Tomasi.

== Career ==
Davenport's first faculty position was as a professor of zoology at Harvard, where he became one of the most prominent American biologists of his time, pioneering new quantitative standards of taxonomy. Davenport had a tremendous respect for the biometric approach to heredity pioneered by English eugenicists Francis Galton and Karl Pearson, whom he met in London, and was involved in Pearson's journal, Biometrika. However, after the rediscovery of Gregor Mendel's laws of heredity, he moved on to become a prominent supporter of Mendelian inheritance.

From 1899 to 1904 Davenport taught at the University of Chicago, where he was also curator of the university's Zoological Museum from 1901 to 1904. In 1903, he helped to found the American Breeders' Association, which later became the American Genetic Association.

In 1904, Davenport became director of Cold Spring Harbor Laboratory. He founded the Eugenics Record Office there in 1910, with a grant from railroad heiress Mary Averell Harriman, whose daughter Mary Harriman Rumsey had worked with Davenport at Cold Spring Harbor while she was a student at Barnard College. During his time at Cold Spring Harbor Laboratory, Davenport began a series of investigations into aspects of the inheritance of human personality and mental traits, and over the years he generated hundreds of papers and several books on the genetics of alcoholism, pellagra (later shown to be due to a vitamin deficiency), criminality, feeblemindedness, tendency to seafaring, bad temper, intelligence, manic depression, and the biological effects of race crossing. Davenport taught eugenics courses to many people at the Laboratory, including the Massachusetts suffragist Claiborne Catlin Elliman. His 1911 book, Heredity in Relation to Eugenics, was used as a college textbook for many years. During Davenport's tenure at Cold Spring Harbor, several reorganizations took place there. In 1918 the Carnegie Institution of Washington took over funding of the ERO with an additional handsome endowment from Mary Harriman.

Davenport was elected to the American Philosophical Society in 1907, and to the National Academy of Sciences in 1912. In 1921, he was elected as a Fellow of the American Statistical Association.

Davenport's research was guided by the racism and classism of his time, which he bought into wholeheartedly. Although he was one of the first scientists to recognize polygenic inheritance (the influence of many genes on a single trait), he continued to employ simple Mendelian models when convenient for making racist and classist claims. His work drew more and more criticism over time. Eventually, only his most ardent admirers regarded his work as truly scientific.

Davenport was particularly interested in race-mixing, which he saw both as a phenomenon that could shed light on the workings of human heredity and as a threat to society. He and his assistants turned repeatedly to Jamaica as a laboratory for studying the heredity of physiological and intellectual characteristics due to its large mixed-race population. Davenport drew on the Mendelian concept of dihybrid crossing—according to which characteristics segregate during reproduction and therefore recombine in different ways in the offspring—to argue that "a hybridized people" (a category which, for Davenport, included the offspring of unions between partners from different parts of Europe as well as the offspring of unions between partners from different continents) were "a badly put together people and a dissatisfied, restless, ineffective people."

Davenport founded the International Federation of Eugenics Organizations (IFEO) in 1925, with Eugen Fischer as chairman of the Commission on Bastardization and Miscegenation (1927). Davenport aspired to found a World Institute for Miscegenations, and "was working on a 'world map' of the 'mixed-race areas, which he introduced for the first time at a meeting of the IFEO in Munich in 1928."

Together with his assistant Morris Steggerda, Davenport attempted to develop a comprehensive quantitative approach to human miscegenation. The results of their research was presented in the book Race Crossing in Jamaica (1929), which attempted to provide statistical evidence for biological and cultural degradation following interbreeding between white and black populations. Today it is considered a work of scientific racism, and was criticized in its time for drawing conclusions which stretched far beyond (and sometimes counter to) the data it presented. Particularly caustic was the review of the book published by Karl Pearson at Nature, where he considered that "the only thing that is apparent in the whole of this lengthy treatise is that the samples are too small and drawn from too heterogeneous a population to provide any trustworthy conclusions at all".

== Influence on immigration policy in the United States ==
Another way Charles Davenport's work manifested in the public sphere is regarding the topic of immigration. He believed that race determined behavior, and that many mental and behavioral traits were hereditary. He drew these conclusions by studying family pedigrees, and was criticized by some of his peers for making unfounded conclusions. Regardless, Davenport believed that the biological differences between the races justified a strict immigration policy, and that people of races deemed “undesirable” should not be allowed into the country. His support of Mendelian genetics fueled this belief, as he believed allowing certain groups of people to enter the country would negatively impact the nation's genetic pool. Domestically, he also supported the prevention of "negative eugenics" through sterilization and sexual segregation of people who were considered genetically inferior. Sharing the racist views of many scientists during this time, those that Davenport considered to be genetically inferior included Black people and Southeastern Europeans.

In addition to supporting these beliefs through his scientific work, he was actively involved in lobbying members of Congress. Charles Davenport spoke regularly with Congressman Albert Johnson, who was a cosponsor of the Immigration Act of 1924, and encouraged him to restrict immigration in that legislation. Davenport was not alone in this effort to influence policy, as Harry Laughlin, the superintendent of the Eugenics Record Office, appeared before Congress on multiple occasions to promote strict immigration laws and the belief that immigration was a "biological problem". In all, Davenport’s efforts served to provide scientific justification to social policies he supported, and immigration was one way this manifested in the beginning of the 20th century.

== End of career and impact ==
After Adolf Hitler's rise to power in Germany, Davenport maintained connections with various Nazi institutions and publications, both before and during World War II. He held editorial positions at two influential German journals, both of which were founded in 1935, and in 1939 he wrote a contribution to the Festschrift for Otto Reche, who became an important figure in the plan to "remove" those populations considered "inferior" in eastern Germany. In a 1938 Letter to the Editor of Life magazine, he included both Franklin Roosevelt and Joseph Goebbels as examples of crippled statesmen who, motivated by their physical defects, have "led revolutions and aspired to dictatorships while burdening their country with heavy taxes and reducing its finances to chaos."

Although many other scientists had stopped supporting eugenics due to the rise of Nazism in Germany, Charles Davenport remained a fervent supporter until the end of his life. Six years after he retired in 1934, Davenport held firm to these beliefs even after the Carnegie Institute pulled funding from the eugenics program at Cold Spring Harbor in 1940. While Charles Davenport is remembered primarily for his role in the eugenics movement, he also had a significant influence in increasing funding for genetics research. His success in organizing the financial support for scientific endeavors fueled his success throughout his career, while also providing for other scientists' studies. Indeed, Cold Spring Harbor saw many prominent geneticists go through its doors while he was its director. He died of pneumonia in 1944 at the age of 77. He is buried in Laurel Hollow, New York.

== Eugenics creed ==
As quoted in the National Academy of Sciences' "Biographical Memoir of Charles Benedict Davenport" by Oscar Riddle, Davenport's Eugenics creed was as follows:

- "I believe in striving to raise the human race to the highest plane of social organization, of cooperative work and of effective endeavor."
- "I believe that I am the trustee of the germ plasm that I carry; that this has been passed on to me through thousands of generations before me; and that I betray the trust if (that germ plasm being good) I so act as to jeopardize it, with its excellent possibilities, or, from motives of personal convenience, to unduly limit offspring."
- "I believe that, having made our choice in marriage carefully, we, the married pair, should seek to have 4 to 6 children in order that our carefully selected germ plasm shall be reproduced in adequate degree and that this preferred stock shall not be swamped by that less carefully selected."
- "I believe in such a selection of immigrants as shall not tend to adulterate our national germ plasm with socially unfit traits."
- "I believe in repressing my instincts when to follow them would injure the next generation."

== Death ==
Davenport was the director and curator of the Cold Spring Harbor Whaling Museum. In 1944, a whale washed up on a nearby beach; Davenport resolved to take its head and use it for a museum exhibit. During the process of preparing the whale's skull, Davenport caught a cold that developed into a fatal case of pneumonia.
