= Cholecystostomy =

Surgical procedure to drain gallbladder

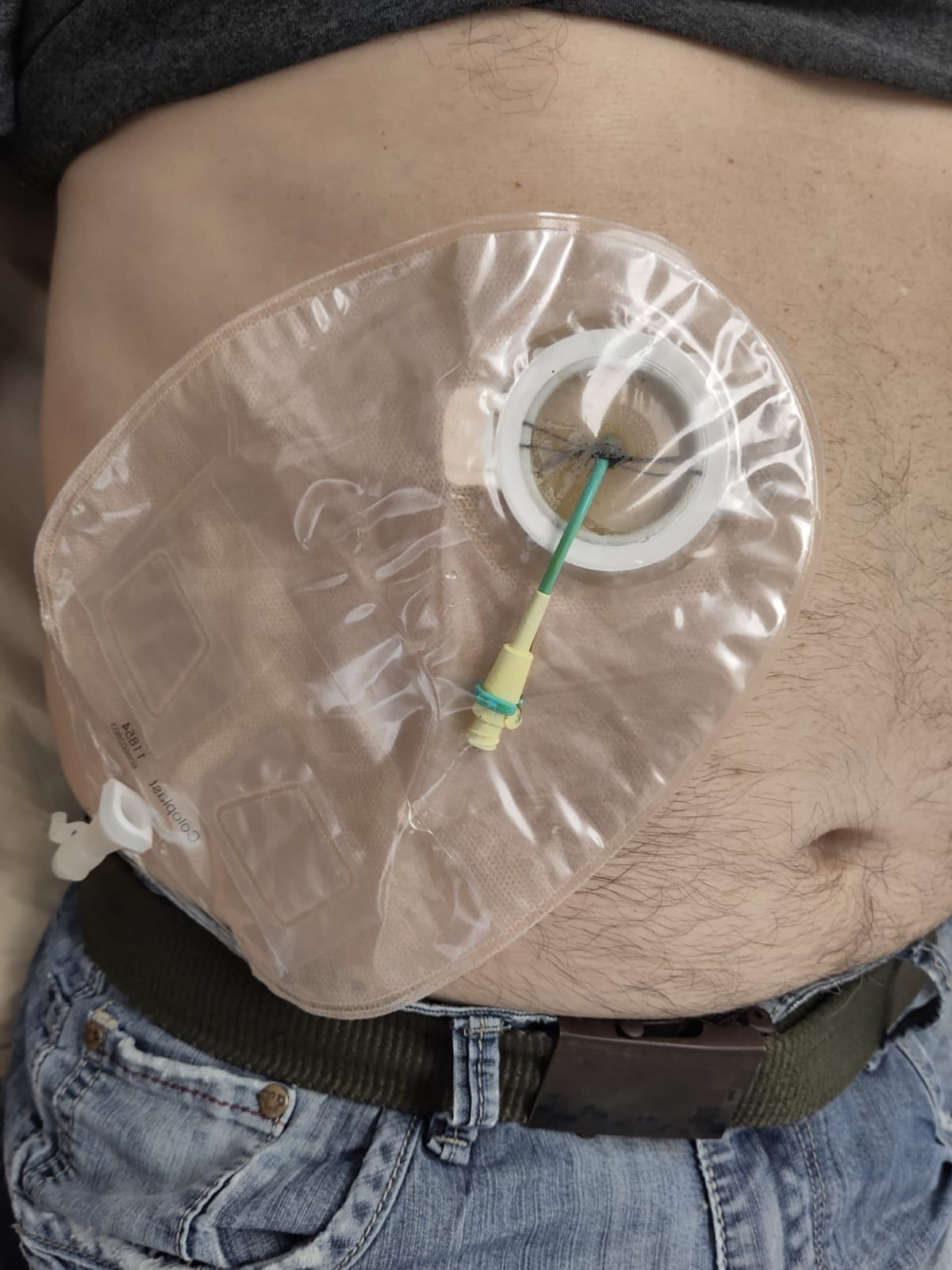
- a medical procedure that creates an opening in the gallbladder for drainage
- Specialty: Interventional radiology, general surgery, gastroenterology
- ICD-10-PCS: ICD-10-PCS 0F9430Z
- ICD-9-CM: 51.02, 51.03
- MeSH: D002767

Cholecystostomy or (cholecystotomy) is a medical procedure used to drain the gallbladder through either a percutaneous or endoscopic approach. The procedure involves creating a stoma in the gallbladder, which can facilitate placement of a tube or stent for drainage, first performed by American surgeon, Dr. John Stough Bobbs, in 1867. It is sometimes used in cases of cholecystitis or other gallbladder disease where the person is ill, and there is a need to delay or defer cholecystectomy. The first endoscopic cholecystostomy was performed by Drs. Todd Baron and Mark Topazian in 2007 using ultrasound guidance to puncture the stomach wall and place a plastic biliary catheter for gallbladder drainage.

== Indications ==
Cholecystostomy finds its application when the patient has cholecystitis and is not a good candidate for surgery. Some indications include:

- Critically ill patients that are clinically unstable to tolerate surgical cholecystectomy
- Patients unable to tolerate anesthesia during the surgery
- Surgically high-risk patients with severe systemic disease (ASA Physical Status Level III)
- Patients resistant to medical management (no clinical improvement after at least 72 hours of medical treatment)
- Severe acute cholecystitis (Grade III acute cholecystitis according to the Tokyo Guidelines)

== Contraindications ==
Contraindications to cholecystostomy include:

- Coagulopathy
- Interposition of gastrointestinal contents between the skin and the gallbladder (increases the risk of organ perforation)
- Biliary peritonitis
- Ascites

== Percutaneous cholecystostomy ==
=== Approach ===
Percutaneous cholecystostomy is performed under sedation and guided by ultrasound (US) or computed tomography (CT) imaging. There are 3 major considerations when deciding the approach for this procedure.

1. Trans-hepatic. This approach is most common and involves puncturing through the liver into the gallbladder. Some advantages include: fewer bile leaks due to the liver abutting against the gallbladder and acting as a tamponade, lower risk of bowel perforation, and better outcomes in patients with severe ascites. The major disadvantage is the increased risk of liver hemorrhage, especially in patients with coagulation disorders.
2. Trans-peritoneal. This approach is used when anatomical challenges or liver diseases and coagulopathy prevent the trans-hepatic approach. It involves avoiding the liver and going through the peritoneal cavity. The primary advantage is decreased risk of liver hemorrhage. The major disadvantage is increased incidence of bile leaks.
3. Subcostal vs. Intercostal. The literature currently does not have enough evidence to support one approach over the other. However, it is believed that due to the proximity to the lung and the associated neurovascular bundle under the ribs, the intercostal approach may be associated with higher incidence of pneumothorax, pleurobiliary fistula, and nerve damage. Thus, the subcostal approach is preferred.

There are numerous studies comparing the trans-hepatic and trans-peritoneal approaches and their associated complications. Some studies have shown that there is no statistically significant difference in complications between the two approaches and recommend operator preference. A more recent study, however, did suggest greater incidence of hemorrhage with the trans-hepatic approach.

=== Technique ===
Before the procedure, a thorough review of the patient's imaging is conducted to evaluate the anatomy of the gallbladder and surrounding structures. The patient's clinical status, medications, and laboratory values (i.e. white blood cell count, coagulation studies, inflammatory markers, anticoagulation therapy, etc.) are reviewed to ensure the patient is stable for the procedure.

Once the patient is ready, the surgical site is cleaned with an antiseptic solution to minimize the risk of infection. Local anesthesia, in the form of a topical 1% lidocaine injection, is administered. A small incision is made in the right upper quadrant (RUQ) directly above the gallbladder, using a #11 blade. At this point, there are 2 main techniques to perform the cholecystostomy.

1. Seldinger technique. The Seldinger technique starts with inserting an 18 or 19-gauge needle with a guide wire through the incision into the gallbladder under image guidance. The needle is then removed and exchanged with progressively larger dilators to enlarge the opening into the gallbladder. Finally, an 8 French pigtail catheter or larger (if indicated) is inserted over the guide wire. Once the pigtail is visualized to be securely lodged into the gallbladder, the guide wire is removed and a gravity drain is attached to the catheter. The Seldinger technique allows for a smaller needle size, which decreases perforation risk.
2. Trocar technique. The Trocar technique starts with loading an 8 French pigtail catheter over a trocar. Under image guidance, the apparatus is inserted until the tip is visualized entering the gallbladder. The pigtail catheter is then inserted over the trocar into the gallbladder. Once the catheter is in place, it is locked and the trocar is removed. Finally, a gravity drain is attached to drain fluid from the gallbladder.

=== Complications ===
Cholecystostomy is a medical procedure and carries its share of complications and adverse effects. Complications occur in approximately 10% of cases. The most common issues encountered are catheter dislodgement, blockage, or a bile leak, which, while frequent, are considered minor complications. Major complications, although rare, encompass sepsis, significant hemorrhage, pneumothorax, and bowel injury. Notably, the transhepatic approach offers advantages by reducing the risk of both organ perforation and bile leaks.

=== Tube Removal ===
Once the cholecystostomy tube is placed, it is recommended to keep the tube for 3–6 weeks to allow the tract to mature. Studies have shown that premature removal (before 21 days) is associated with a higher incidence of bile leaks. Once the cholecystitis is resolved and adequate time has passed for tract maturation, a clamp trial can be conducted for 24 hours to assess drainage from the gallbladder. If the patient passes the clamp trial (minimal to no drainage after unclamping), the tube is removed. Future management consists of performing a cholecystectomy to prevent future episodes of cholecystitis once the patient is stable for surgery.

== Endoscopic cholecystostomy ==
An alternative to the percutaneous cholecystostomy is to use the endoscopic route. There are 2 primary techniques: endoscopic transpapillary gallbladder drainage (ET-GBD) and endoscopic ultrasound-guided gallbladder drainage (EUS-GBD). These techniques are considered when the patient is a poor candidate for surgical cholecystectomy but can tolerate anesthesia for an endoscopic procedure and does not have a gallbladder perforation.

=== Endoscopic Transpapillary Gallbladder Drainage ===
This procedure is performed during an endoscopic retrograde cholangiopancreatography (ERCP). The cystic duct is cannulated and a plastic stent is deployed to relieve the blockage and allow for drainage. ET-GBD can be considered when the patient is already undergoing an ERCP for another medical condition (i.e. choledocholithiasis). Some drawbacks include an increased risk of pancreatitis from the ERCP procedure and a lower success rate compared to EUS-GBD or percutaneous cholecystostomy, particularly when there is evidence of cystic duct obstruction (i.e. stones, adhesions, strictures, cancer, or other masses).

=== Endoscopic Ultrasound-guided Gallbladder Drainage ===
EUS-GBD allows for internal drainage by placing a lumen-apposing metal stent (LAMS) into the gallbladder from either the stomach or the duodenum. The procedure involves using a cautery-powered LAMS to puncture through the gastric wall and enter the gallbladder. Two flanges on either side of the LAMS are deployed, tethering the stent on the inside walls of the gallbladder and gastric lumen. An important consideration is that the gallbladder must be within 10mm of the gastric puncture site. EUS-GBD is a good option for patients who are unlikely to undergo a future surgical cholecystectomy. It may also be used in patients with a cystic duct occlusion, or a pre-existing uncovered metal biliary stent. Some advantages include a high success rate with few complications and a reduced need for reinterventions. The primary drawback is the risk of stent occlusion with food or gastric contents. This risk is lowered when entering through the duodenum. EUS-GBD also complicates a future surgical cholecystectomy because the patient's anatomy is modified, requiring an additional repair of the choleycystoenteric fistula.

== See also ==
- Interventional Radiology
- List of surgeries by type
