= Samuel Elbert (disambiguation) =

Samuel Elbert may refer to:

- Samuel Elbert (1740–1788), American officer in the Revolutionary War, governor of Georgia, and merchant
- Samuel A. Elbert (1832–1902), American physician and political candidate in Indiana
- Samuel Hitt Elbert (1833–1899), governor of the Territory of Colorado
- Samuel Hoyt Elbert (1907–1997), American linguist
