= Green Village =

Green Village may refer to:

- Green Village, New Jersey, an unincorporated community
- Green Village, Pennsylvania, an unincorporated community

== See also ==
- Lochiel Park Green Village, an environmentally friendly residential area in Adelaide, South Australia
