= Henry Furniss =

Henry Furniss may refer to:

- Henry Watson Furniss (1868–1955), American medical doctor and diplomat
- Henry Sanderson Furniss, 1st Baron Sanderson (1868–1939), English educationalist and socialist politician

== See also ==
- Harry Furniss (1854–1925), British illustrator
