= John Stough Bobbs =

American surgeon (1809–1870)

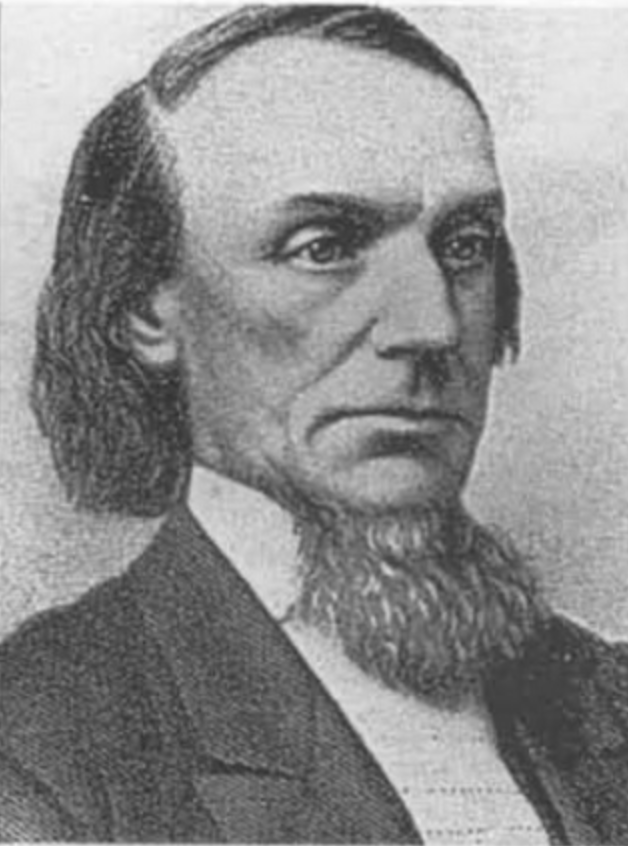

Indiana State Senator
- In office 1857–1859
- Constituency: Marion County

Personal details
- Born: December 28, 1809 Greenvillage, Franklin County, Pennsylvania, United States
- Died: May 1, 1870 (aged 60) Indianapolis, Marion County, Indiana, United States
- Resting place: Crown Hill National Cemetery, Indianapolis, Indiana, Section 7, Lot 53; 39.8213119°N 86.1754626°W
- Party: Republican
- Education: Jefferson Medical College
- Occupation: Surgeon, physician, politician, educator
- Known for: first successful cholecystotomy (1867), founder of Indiana Medical College (1869)

John Stough Bobbs (1809–1870) was an American surgeon, medical doctor, politician, and educator. He was a medical pioneer, and in 1867 he performed the first successful cholecystotomy for the removal of gallstones. Bobbs was the founder of Indiana Medical College in 1869.

== Early life and education ==
John Stough Bobbs was born on December 28, 1809, in Greenvillage, Pennsylvania, United States.

He studied medicine under Dr. Martin Luther of Harrisburg, Pennsylvania; and graduated with a M.D. in 1836 from Jefferson Medical College (now Thomas Jefferson University) in Philadelphia. Although some records dispute his medical degree.

== Career ==
Bobbs helped establish the Indiana Hospital for the Insane (1848; later known as Central State Hospital), where he served as a commissioner; he founded the Indianapolis Medical Society (1848); and helped with the founding of the Indiana State Medical Society (1849).

From 1848 until 1852, Bobbs worked at Indiana Central Medical College, in various roles including as Dean. He was elected in 1856 an Indiana state senator, representing Marion County. During the American Civil War, Bobbs served in the Union Army as a medical inspector and as a commissioned surgeon. In 1860, Bobbs was delegate to Republican National Convention from Indiana.

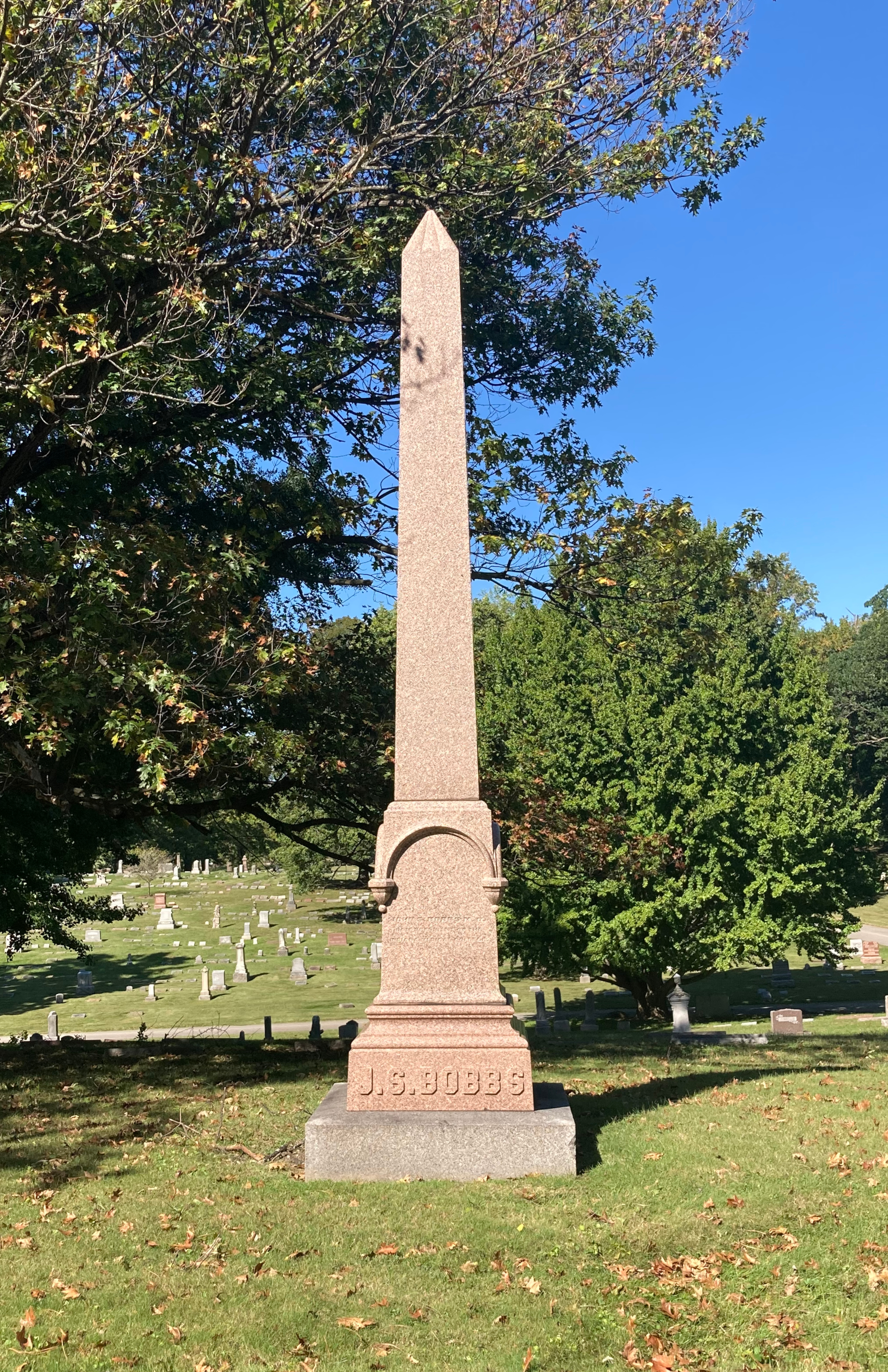
Grave of Bobbs at Crown Hill Cemetery

In 1867, Bobbs performed a gallbladder surgery for the removal of gallstones, and published a paper on the surgery. The surgery happened above a pharmacy, and he used chloroform anesthetic. No antiseptic was used in the surgery. A 30-year-old woman named Mary E. Wiggins had a large mass removed, which included multiple gallstones (some report 40 gallstones), and she made a good recovery. It took a decade before another gallstone removal surgery was recorded.

Bobbs founded the Indiana Medical College in 1869, in order to maintain local physicians. In 1908, Indiana Medical College was merged into the Indiana University School of Medicine.

He died of pneumonia on May 1, 1870, in Indianapolis, and is buried at Crown Hill Cemetery.

== See also ==
- Carl Langenbuch
