= Sumner Alexander Furniss =

African American physician, surgeon (1874–1953)

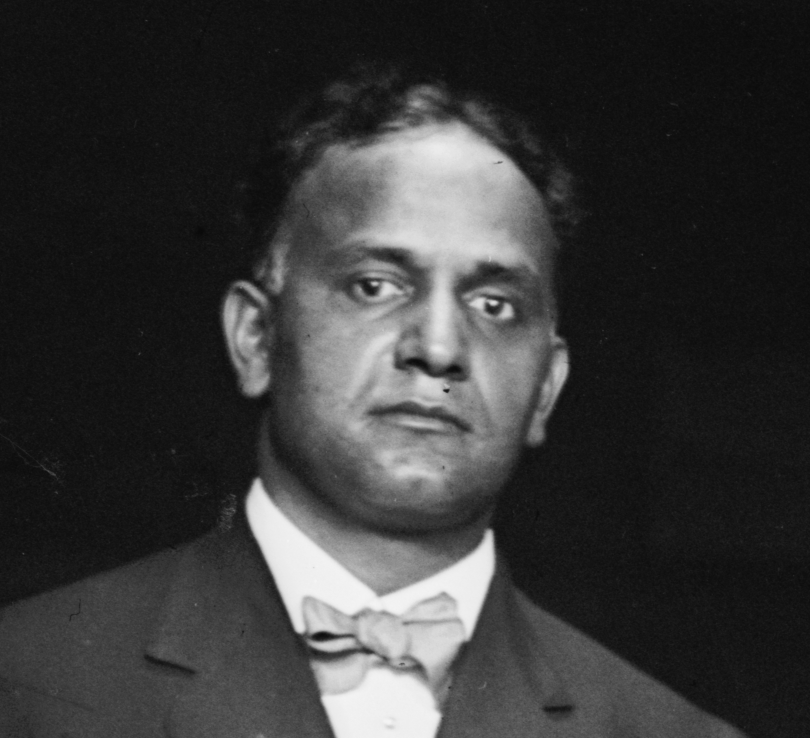
- Furniss in 1910
- Born: January 30, 1874; Jackson, Mississippi, U.S.
- Died: January 18, 1953 (aged 78); Crown Hill Cemetery and Arboretum
- Resting place: Crown Hill Cemetery and Arboretum Sec 47, Lot 64; 39.8227462°N 86.1646°W
- Education: Lincoln University (Missouri), Medical College of Indiana
- Occupation: physician

Sumner Alexander Furniss (January 30, 1874 – January 18, 1953) was an American prominent Black physician, founding member and president of the Indianapolis Young Men's Colored Association, councilman, and freemason.

== Early life ==
Sumner Alexander Furniss was born on January 30, 1874, the younger son to William H. Furniss and Mary Elizabeth J. Williams. His family moved from Jackson, Mississippi to Indianapolis when he was young and he attended the local schools. Summer attended Lincoln University (Missouri), and then Medical College of Indiana, graduating in 1894 as the only African American in his class.

== Career ==
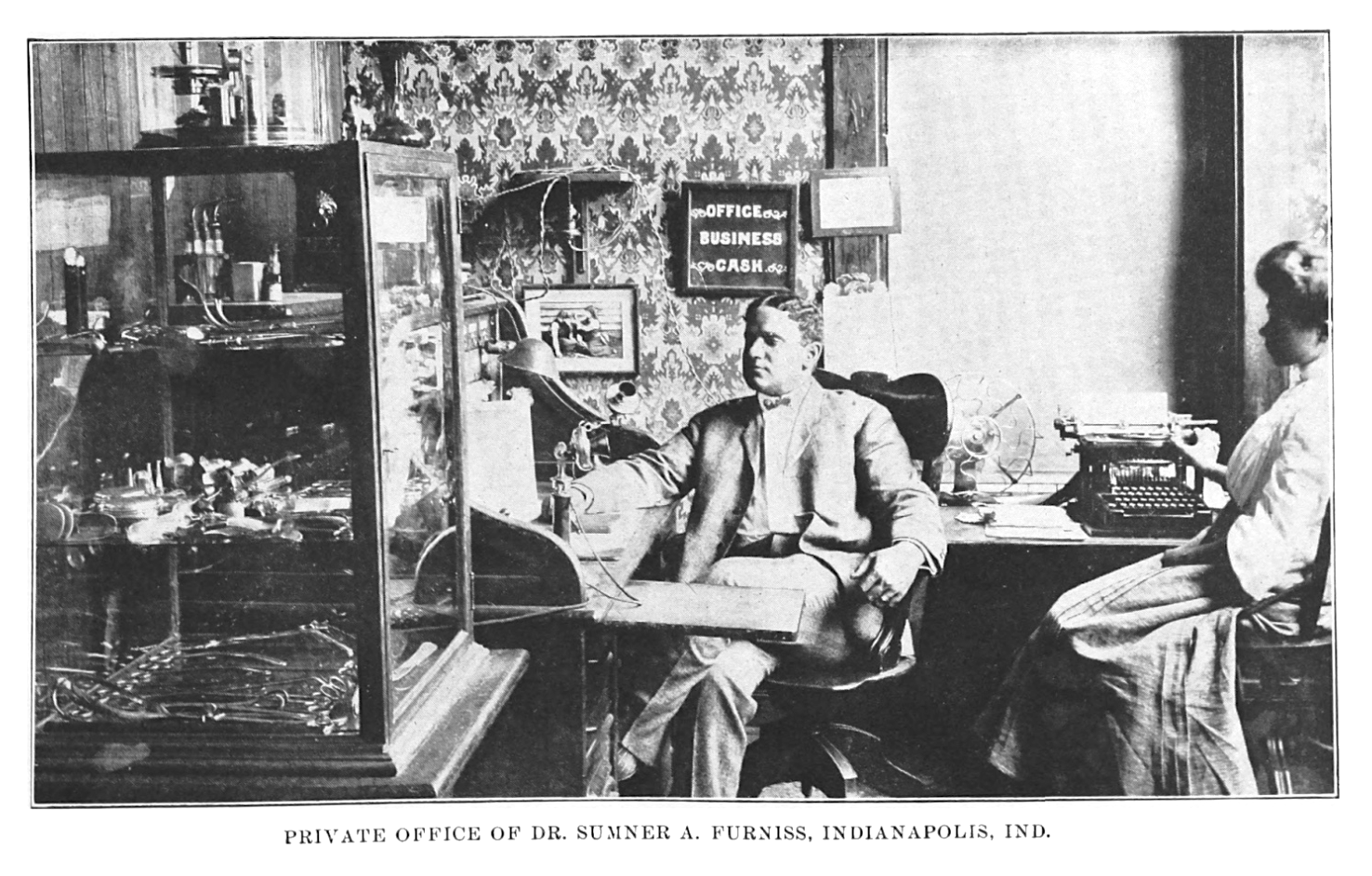
Private office of Dr. Sumner Alexander Furniss of Indianapolis, Indiana

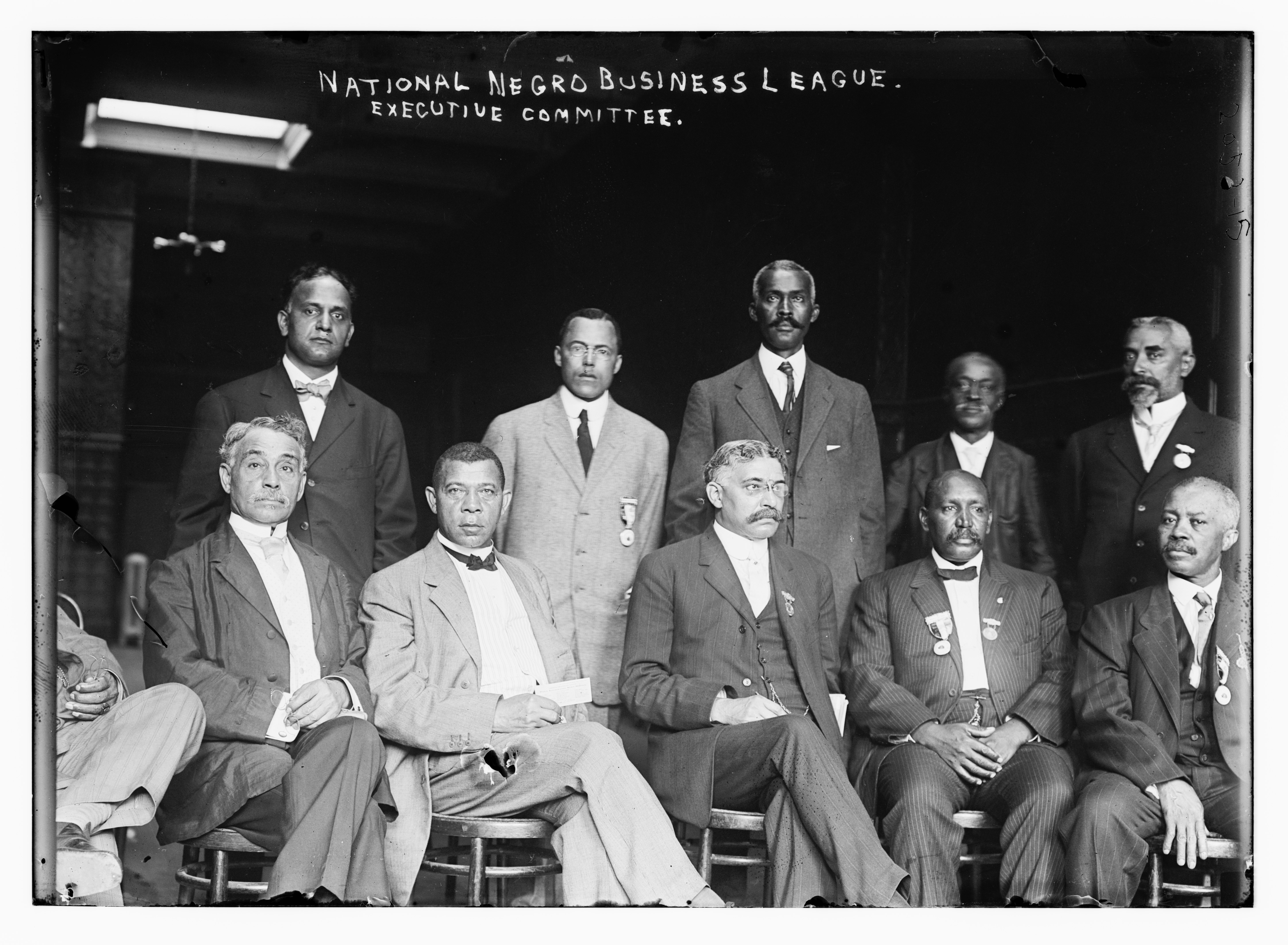
National Negro Business League Executive Committee LCCN2014688320

Furniss was the first African-American to be a doctor at Indiana City Hospital in Indianapolis. He opened a general practice with his brother, Henry Watson Furniss, and in 1909, he founded the first Black hospital, Lincoln Hospital, in Indianapolis. He was a member of the American Medical Association, Indiana State Medical Society, Indianapolis Medical Society, and was the state vice president of the Black National Medical Association. Furniss was active in politics as a Republican, serving as a delegate locally and nationally, as well as serving as an Indianapolis City Council from 1917 to 1921.

== Personal and social life ==
On October 26, 1905, he married Lillian Morris. They had no children. Furniss was a prominent Prince Hall Freemason. He was a member of Central Lodge, No. 1. In 1898, he was elected as Commander-in-Chief of Constantine Consistory, No. 14. He was the Sovereign Grand Commander of the United Supreme Council of the Scottish Rite. He was a member of the Grand United Order of Odd Fellows in America and Knights of Pythias of North America, South America, Europe, Asia, Africa and Australia. He was a founder of the Iota Lambda Chapter of the Alpha Phi Alpha.

== Legacy ==
He died on January 18, 1953, in Indianapolis.

A Prince Hall lodge is named after him as well as a Sickle Cell Research Center.
