= Indiana Medical College =

Medical school in Indianapolis, Indiana, U.S. (1869–1905)

Coordinates: 39.7757°N 86.1782°W

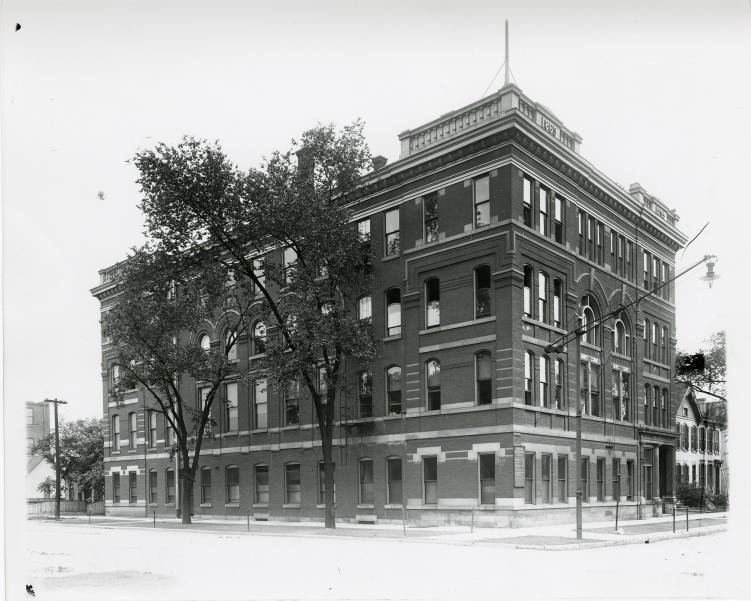
- Former name: Medical College of Indiana (1878–1879)
- Active: 1869–1905
- Founder: John Stough Bobbs
- Academic affiliations: School of Medicine of Purdue University–Indianapolis (1905–1907), Indiana University School of Medicine (1908–present)
- Location: 212 North Senate Ave., Indianapolis, Indiana, United States

Indiana Medical College was a medical school founded in Indianapolis, Indiana, United States, active from 1869 to 1905. It eventually merged and became the School of Medicine of Purdue University (1905–1907), followed by another merge in 1908 into Indiana University School of Medicine. The former campus no longer exists, and the land was used to build Emerson Hall at Indiana University. It was also known as the Medical College of Indiana for one year starting in 1878.

== Pre-history ==
It was preceded by the Central Medical College (1849–1852) in Indianapolis, and the Indiana Medical College (1844–1850; formerly La Porte University School of Medicine) in La Porte, Indiana which later moved to Charles, Illinois, followed by Rock, Illinois, and Keokuk, Iowa.

== History ==
Indiana Medical College was established on North Senate Ave. in Indianapolis, and it expanded to an adjacent property. Clinics were initially held at the City Hospital. Clinical studies were carried out at various of the city's hospitals. Some Indiana physicians not from Indianapolis were upset, and felt this medical school only represented a select group from the Indianapolis Academy of Medicine.

After a dispute with the college, Samuel A. Elbert received a medical degree from the school in 1871, making him first the African American to receive a medical degree in Indiana.

From 1871 to 1876, Indiana Medical College had an agreement with Indiana College (now Indiana University) to offer medical courses, however the partnership ended when Indiana College failed to obtain state funding to continue the program. At this point in time the education at Indiana Medical College was not academically rigorous and some students graduated with a degree after only a five-month course, however they still required years of medical apprenticeship.

In 1878, it merged with the College of Physicians and Surgeons to become the Medical College of Indiana. It only held the name "Medical College of Indiana" for one year.

== Closure and mergers ==
In 1905 the Indiana Medical College merged with the School of Medicine of Purdue University–Indianapolis, and it remained on the campus until 1907. The Indiana Medical College, the School of Medicine of Purdue University, and the alumni group of the Central College of Physicians and Surgeons had passed a resolution in 1906 rejecting affiliation with Indiana Medical College.

In 1903, Indiana University introduced their own medical school. After local contentious battles amongst the medical schools in 1908, Purdue University, the Indiana Medical College and two other schools merged into the Indiana University at Bloomington, and the medical school was moved into the former campus of Indiana Medical College. By 1916, the campus building suffered detrimental water damage and was torn down. It was replaced by Emerson Hall at Indiana University, which houses their school of medicine.

== Notable alumni ==
- Lydia Allen DeVilbiss (class of 1907) physician and author on topics such as birth control and eugenics
- Samuel A. Elbert (class of 1871) first African American to receive a medical degree in the state of Indiana
- Sumner Alexander Furniss (class of 1894) early Black physician and community leader
- David Starr Jordan (class of 1875) ichthyologist, founding president of Stanford University, president of Indiana University, and supporter of eugenics
- Loy McAfee (class of 1904) surgeon
- Beulah Wright Porter (attended c. 1869) first African American woman physician in Indianapolis, educator, and a clubwoman; believed to have created the first outdoor tuberculosis treatment facility in the United States
- Ada Estelle Schweitzer (enrolled 1902, class of 1907) American public health advocate and supporter of eugenics
- Harvey W. Wiley, author of the 1906 Pure Food and Drug Act
