= James Sidney Hinton =

American politician (1834–1982)

Representative James Sidney Hinton
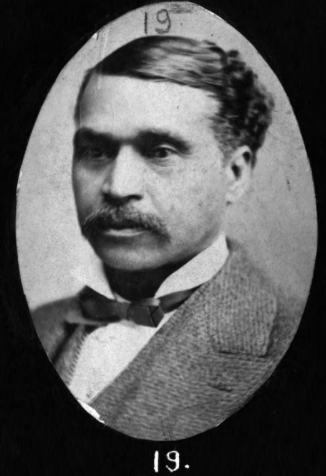
- Hinton in 1880

Member of the Indiana House of Representatives from the Marion County district
- In office 1881–1882

Personal details
- Born: December 25, 1834 Raleigh, North Carolina, U.S.
- Died: November 6, 1892 (aged 57) Brazil, Indiana, U.S.
- Resting place: Crown Hill Cemetery and Arboretum, Section CG, Lot 1314; 39.8154644°N 86.1760708°W
- Party: Republican

James Sidney Hinton (December 25, 1834 – November 6, 1892) was a Civil War veteran and Republican politician, the first African American to hold state office in Indiana and the first African American to serve in the Indiana state legislature.

Born in Raleigh, North Carolina to parents who were free people of color, he moved with them as a youth to Indiana. Hinton started working part-time as a barber while attending school. Later he became involved with politics and the Republican Party. A veteran of the American Civil War, he was commissioned as a lieutenant in the United States Colored Troops. He became active in postwar politics, serving as a trustee on the Wabash and Erie Canal, and in 1880 being elected to the State House.

== Early life and education ==
Hinton was born in 1834 to John Cooper Hinton and Hannah Mitchell Hinton, free people of color in Raleigh, North Carolina. His father was a successful builder of skylights. In 1848 the family moved to Terre Haute, Indiana.

There Hinton began to work part-time as a barber, while attending a subscription school organized by the local African-American community for four years. He next attended a Quaker high school in Hartford, Vigo County for two years.

Hinton later attended the Union Literary Institute in Union City, Indiana (known in some sources as the "Greenville Institute" or "Darke County Seminary"). The Institute was located within the Greenville Settlement which straddled the Indiana-Ohio state line. Hiram Revels, also from a free family, who later became a politician and would be elected as the first African-American United States Senator, was among his classmates.

In 1859, Hinton was elected Grand Master of the Indiana lodge of the Prince Hall Masons.

At the outbreak of the American Civil War in 1861, Hinton sought to enlist in the Union Army in Indiana but was first turned away because of his race. In 1863, the United States opened the Army to African-American volunteers.

Hinton enlisted and was commissioned as a second lieutenant. He became a recruiting officer for various Union regiments of the US Colored Troops, including the 54th Massachusetts Infantry Regiment, 55th Massachusetts Infantry Regiment and 28th Indiana Infantry Regiment (Colored).

== Move to state capital and marriage ==
In 1862, Hinton moved to Indianapolis, where he lived and worked for the rest of his life. He set up a real estate and intelligence office, which he operated from 1862 to 1867. He married Eliza J. Mitchell in 1862 in Indianapolis.

== Political career ==
After the Civil War, Hinton became known as a powerful Republican campaigner, speaking in numerous states. His rise in political status was propelled by his strong ties to a community network through the Methodist Episcopal Church and the Masons.

In 1872, Hinton was elected as an at-large delegate to the Republican National Convention. He was one of only two African-American delegates there.

From 1874 to 1878, Hinton served as a trustee of the Wabash and Erie Canal, becoming Indiana's first African-American holder of statewide office.

In 1880, Hinton was elected to represent Marion County in the Indiana State House. He served one term, being defeated in the next Republican primary by Samuel A. Elbert. Elbert was also African American and failed to win the general election. Hinton remained politically active after his defeat. In 1892, after giving a speech in support of the Republican campaign in Brazil, Indiana, Hinton collapsed and died.

== Legacy ==
Hinton is buried in the historic Crown Hill Cemetery in Indianapolis. In 2014, a bust of Hinton was unveiled at the Indiana State Capitol, where it stands on the second floor alongside the bust of U.S. Representative Julia Carson as part of a permanent Black history display. Both sculptures are the work of Jon Hair.

== See also ==
- African American officeholders from the end of the Civil War until before 1900
- List of African-American officeholders (1900–1959)
