= Ada Estelle Schweitzer =

American public health advocate (1872–1951)

Ada Estelle Schweitzer (August 29, 1872 – July 2, 1951) was an American public health advocate for women and infants in Indiana, an expert in infant health care, and a pioneer in public health in the early twentieth century. As the director of the Indiana State Board of Health's Division of Child and Infant Hygiene from 1919 to 1933, Schweitzer is best known for organizing and supervising Indiana's Better Baby contests at the Indiana State Fair from 1920 to 1932. Schweitzer's and her staff's educational outreach activities also helped change attitudes about child and maternal health. Statistics confirm that the state's infant mortality rate decreased during her years as a public health leader in Indiana to the fourth lowest in the United States, an accomplishment that was partly attributed to the efforts of her division. In addition to her work for Indiana's State Board of Health, Schweitzer was the author of numerous articles on children's health and was elected as president of the American Association of Women in Public Health in 1928.

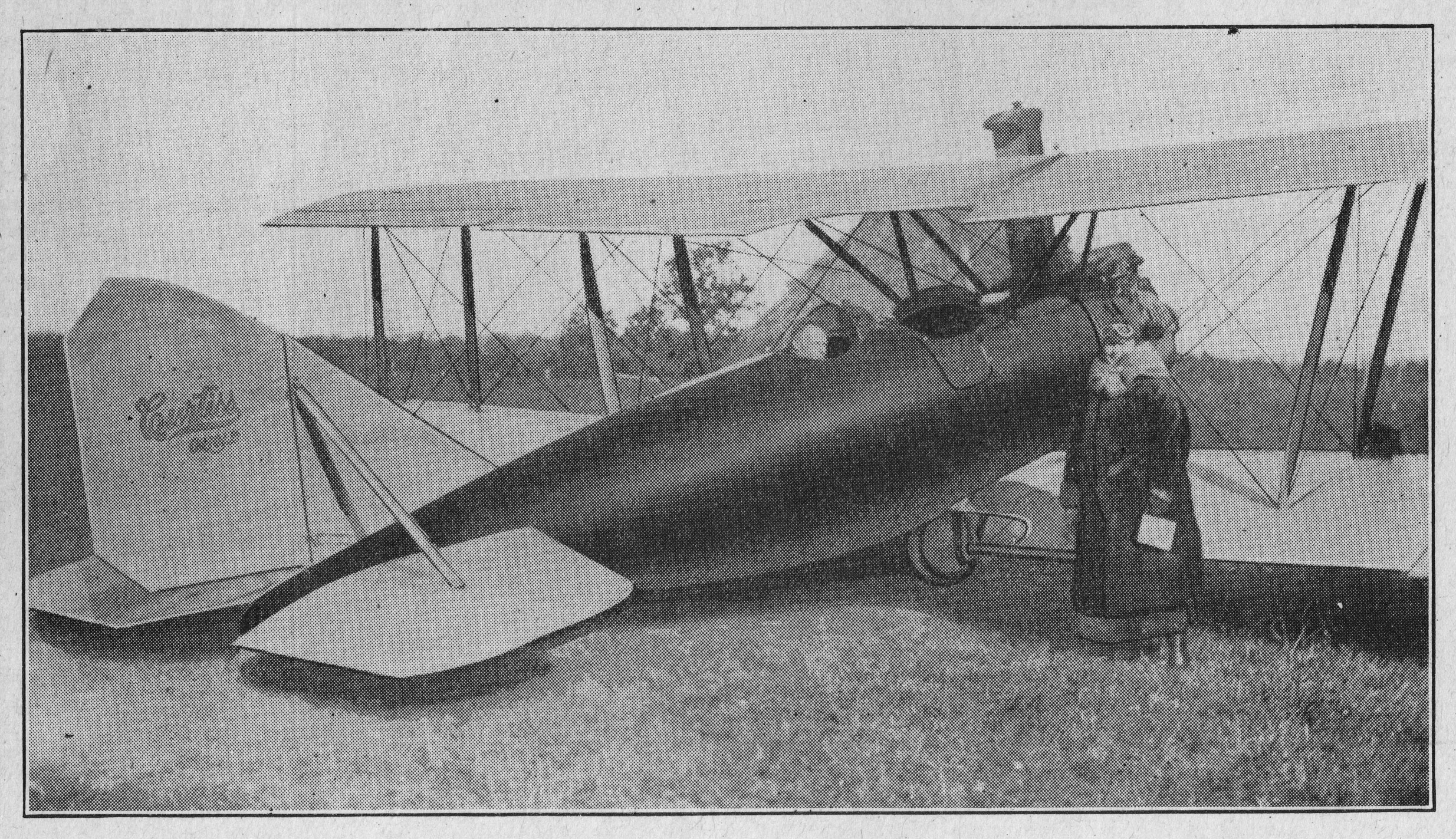
Dr. Ada E. Schweitzer standing by the side of an aeroplane at Lagrange, Ind.

Schweitzer's public health advocacy was controversial due to her support of eugenics. The Progressive Era reformer supported Indiana's eugenic marriage and sterilization laws, which were ruled unconstitutional, while she promoted and encouraged efforts to improve maternal, prenatal, and pediatric care across Indiana. Although the Better Baby contests that Schweitzer supervised were credited with educating the public about raising healthier children and helping to lower infant mortality, the contest's exclusionary practices reinforced social class and racial discrimination because they were limited to white infants. African American and immigrant children were barred from the competitions.

== Early life and education ==
Ada Estelle Schweitzer was born on August 29, 1872, in rural LaGrange County, Indiana. She attended Lima High School and earned a bachelor's degree from Michigan State Normal College. After attending college in Michigan, Schweitzer taught school for several years before she began studies at the Indiana Medical College in Indianapolis in 1902, earning a medical degree in 1907. During medical school Schweitzer studied bacteriology with a focus on infectious diseases.

== Career ==
Schweitzer began her career as a teacher, but became a public health advocate for women and infants after graduating from medical school in 1907. In 1919 Doctor Schweitzer was appointed director of the Indiana Board of Health's Division of Child and Infant Hygiene and served in that capacity until 1933.

=== Early years ===
Schweitzer began her public health career in 1906 as an assistant bacteriologist for the Indiana State Board of Health. At the state laboratory she initially concentrated on infectious diseases, such as malaria, typhoid fever, and diphtheria, among others. In 1912 she began specifically focusing on children's health issues. Schweitzer collaborated on projects with the U.S. Children's Bureau and surveyed infant mortality in Gary, Indiana. In 1918 she chaired the Indiana chapter of the American Association for the Study and Prevention of Infant Mortality. Schweitzer was also a member of the Indiana State Mental Hygiene Association.

=== Director, Division of Infant and Child Hygiene ===
In 1919 the Indiana General Assembly authorized and funded the Division of Infant Health and Child Hygiene as a part of Indiana's State Board of Health. Doctor John N. Hurty, director of the State Board of Health, appointed Schweitzer as director of the new division. In her new role Schweitzer spoke to gatherings around the state to encourage improved pediatric care, launched the state's better baby movement, and supervised the Better Baby contests at the Indiana State Fair from 1920 to 1932.

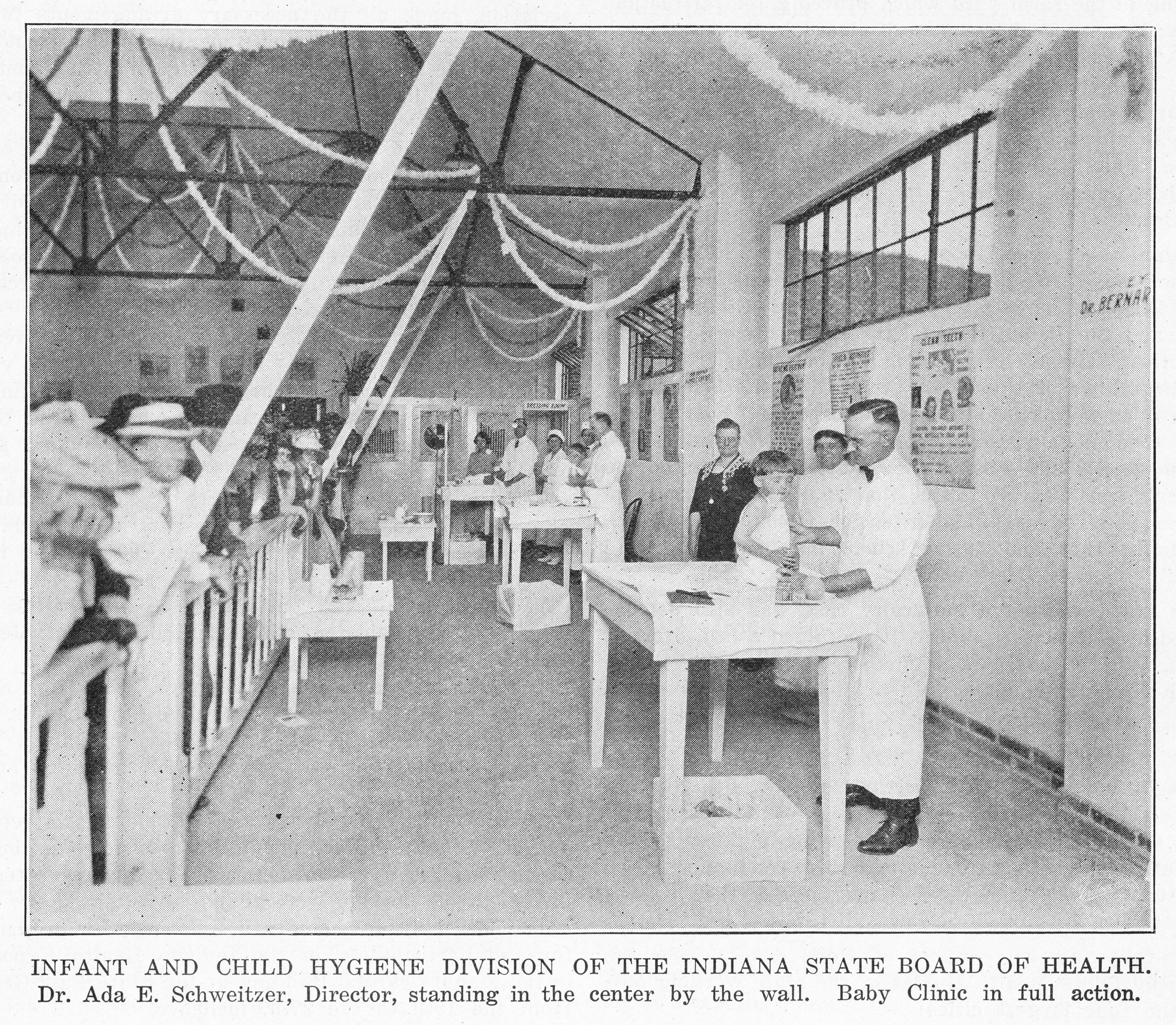
Infant and Child Hygiene Division of the Indiana State Board of Health. Dr. Ada E. Schweizter, Director, standing in the center by the wall. Baby Clinic in full action.

Schweitzer's division began with an appropriation of $10,000 and three staff members (a nurse, a chauffeur, and a stenographer). Her initial task was to deliver public health information across the state, especially to remote rural areas. Schweitzer toured Indiana in a truck that included additional equipment to project Magic lantern slides and screen films during her talks to local residents. Schweitzer's work also included managing her staff, authoring articles, and supervising health assessments of young children in all of Indiana's ninety-two counties. A report published in 1920 indicated that Schweitzer's division had collaborated with 476 local, 53 state, and 63 national organizations; hosted conference in 27 Indiana counties; examined 8,000 children; and made presentations at events held in 290 Indiana towns.

The significant growth in Schweitzer's division in the early 1920s is attributed to the passage of the Sheppard–Towner Act (1921), which provided federal funding to states that offered maternal and infant-care programs. To become eligible for the matching federal funds, the Indiana General Assembly and Governor Warren T. McCray passed and approved enabling legislation and state funding in 1923. The additional funding tripled the division's initial budget, helped broaden its efforts, expanded its staff, and provided funds to support various studies. In 1925 Schweitzer's staff included four physicians and five registered nurses. By 1926 the division's operating budget was $60,000 and included more than twenty full- and part-time employees.

Schweitzer's Division of Infant and Child Hygiene's activities were varied as well as controversial. Schweitzer and her staff provided lectures and demonstrations on infant care and maternal health, sponsored health conferences, presented exhibitions, hosted baby clinics, published and distributed pamphlets and reports, participated in radio programs, and screened films for the public. Despite these efforts, the Indiana chapter of the American Medical Association criticized Schweitzer and her division as part of its "broad campaign against the State Board of Health" and its opposition to what it called "state" or "socialized" medicine. Sheppard-Towner Act funding ended in 1929 due to opposition from conservatives and medical organizations, including the AMA. The AMA opposed government interference in what it considered individual and private family issues.

Schweitzer claimed that her division helped improve the health of infants, mothers, and the general population, and statistical evidence documents some improvement. Between 1922 and 1929 the number of underweight children dropped 50 percent in Indiana. Infant mortality also declined. For babies under one year of age, the infant mortality was 81.8 deaths per 1,000 in 1920; by 1930 it had dropped to 57.7.

In addition to her work for Indiana's State Board of Health, Schweitzer was elected president of the American Association of Women in Public Health in 1928. She also wrote and published numerous articles related to child care. A few of her published essays included "Infant Conservation" (1919), "Child Hygiene and the Doctor" (1920), "Vitamins and Health" (1928), and "A Doctor Looks at a Child's Teeth" (1932). When Indiana governor Paul V. McNutt took office in 1933, he reorganized the state government, which included dissolving the Division of Infant Hygiene and dismissing Schweitzer and her staff.

=== Better Baby contests ===
Better Baby contests at the Indiana State Fair in Indianapolis began in 1920 and continued through 1932. During the twelve years that Schweitzer directed the contest, it was among the fair's most popular events. In 1924 a Better Baby Contest Building was erected on the fairgrounds with a $10,000 donation from J. E. Oliver of the Oliver Chilled Plow Works. The building was used for exhibit displays, demonstrations, and free examinations of babies not entered in the contests. It also provided space for fair-going mothers to rest and a safe place for babies who were not competing in the baby contest to play and nap. The contest was held in the Woman's Building from 1920 to 1926 and moved to a new Better Baby Contest Building in 1927.

On the radio and in print, Schweitzer used the contest to promote her division's efforts to improve children's health. Local newspapers such as the Indianapolis News, the Indianapolis Star, and commercial sponsors that included the Hoosier Fence Company and the Weber Milk Company also helped promote the contest.

Schweitzer was initially hesitant to include the contest as part of her public health program, but she became a strong supporter of the event after becoming the contest's director. Schweitzer standardized the contest scoring using medical professionals for the examinations and streamlined the event so that it ran smoothly. The contest procedure included recording each child's health history, as well as evaluations of each contestant's physical and mental health and overall development. Scoring began with 1,000 points and was based on a set of guidelines that the AMA and U.S. Children's Bureau had established. Deductions were made for defects. In an effort to eliminate rivalries and concerns from parents, Schweitzer asked the evaluators to make only minor deductions, resulting in each infant attaining a high score. Winners were declared by the smallest of margins and each contestant was awarded a bronze medal on a blue ribbon.

The intent of the contest was to educate the public about raising healthier children; however, its exclusionary practices reinforced social class and racial discrimination. Contestants were limited to white infants, while African American and immigrant children were barred from the competition for ribbons and cash prizes. In addition, the contest scoring was biased toward white, middle-class babies.

Although the specific impact of the contests was difficult to assess, Schweitzer claimed that they helped to reduce infant morality. Statistics helped to back her claims. The Better Baby contests occurred at time when health indicators for Indiana's babies improved, including a reduction in underweight babies. The percentage underweight babies in the state dropped from 10 percent in 1920 to 2 percent in 1929.

== Later years ==
Schweitzer, a Republican, lost her state government job in 1933, after Paul V. McNutt, a Democrat, won the state governorship. Governor McNutt reorganized the state government, which included disbanding the Division of Infant Hygiene and dismissing Schweitzer and her staff. Schweitzer worked at the Children's Bureau in Washington, D.C., from 1993 to 1939. In her later years, she was a psychiatrist at Fletcher Sanitarium and was involved in work for the Methodist Church.

== Death and legacy ==
Schweitzer died on July 2, 1951, in Indianapolis, and is buried in Michigan.

Schweitzer is considered an expert in the field of infant health care and a pioneer in public health. Her work, including the Better Baby contests, is indicative of some of the Progressive Era reform efforts, but it also shows problematic racial and class implications of improving babies' health in Indiana. Schweitzer's public health programs were influenced by the eugenics movement in the early twentieth century. Her message was to produce "better babies through improved rearing and superior breeding." She supported Indiana's eugenic marriage and sterilization laws, which were later ruled unconstitutional, and the state government's right "to restrict procreation and marriage." Schweitzer also encouraged Hoosiers "to reproduce responsibly." While the Better Baby contests were credited with helping to lower infant mortality in Indiana, they also helped to normalize the concept of eugenics for residents of the state.

As a tireless, progressive crusader, Schweitzer's and her staff's efforts helped to change attitudes about child and maternal health in Indiana. Statistics confirm that the state's infant mortality decreased during her years as a public health leader in Indiana to the fourth lowest in the United States. This accomplishment was partly attributed to the division's educational outreach efforts. In its first decade of work during the 1920s the division examined 77,584 children, enrolled 55,171 mothers in the division's classes, and 606,364 people had attended its health-related film screenings. In addition, the division had distributed 1.2 million healthcare pamphlets.

In 1936 state legislation was passed to partially revive Schweitzer's division using Title V funds under the Social Security Act (1935). Indiana's Bureau of Maternal and Child Health was financially supported with state and federal funding.
