= Loy McAfee =

American surgeon and editor (1868–1941)

Loy McAfee, M.D.
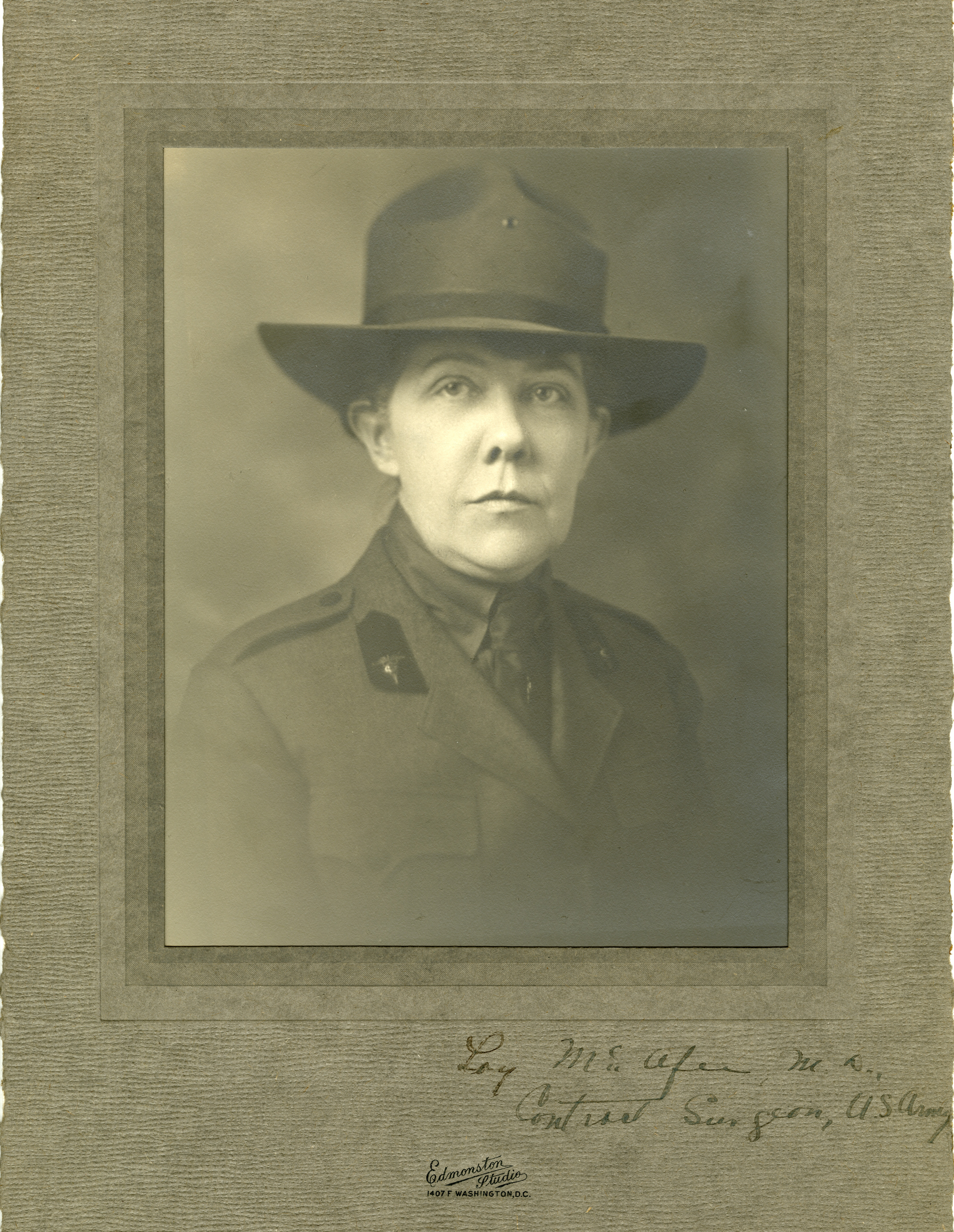
- Born: 1868; Paulding County, near Atlanta, Georgia, United States
- Died: 1941 (aged 72–73)
- Education: Indiana Medical College, MD, 1904; National Law School, LLB, 1926
- Occupations: Surgeon, bibliographer, editor
- Employer: Office of the Surgeon General
- Notable work: "The Medical Department of the United States Army in the World War," editor.

Loy McAfee (1868 – 1941) was an American surgeon, bibliographer, and editor. She also had a degree in law.

== Early life and education ==
Loy McAfee was born in Paulding County, Georgia, in 1868. She attended Medical College of Indiana, graduating with her MD in 1904.

== Early career ==
She worked in the medical publishing industry in New York until 1918 and served as a contract surgeon in the United States Army Medical Corps from 1918 to 1921. McAfee was one of fifty-five women who signed on to serve as contract surgeons during World War I. She earned a salary equivalent to that of first lieutenant, though she did not hold an official rank. She was assigned to the Office of the Surgeon General on May 17, 1918, and served as the secretary to the Board of Publication. This position was in the Library of the Surgeon General's Office, the forerunner to the National Library of Medicine. At the Library, McAfee worked as a bibliographer and compiler for the Index-Catalogue. After 1921, McAfee worked in a civilian post and continued working on similar tasks.

McAfee started working towards her law degree at the National Law School in Washington, D.C., in the 1920s, earning her LLB in 1926.

== Research and publications ==
Loy McAfee led the effort to document the activities of the Army Medical Department during World War I. She provided editorial direction for "The Medical Department of the United States Army in the World War", a 15-volume work completed in 1930. Several parts were reviewed in JAMA.

McAfee published "Social Medicine, Medical Economics and Miscellany " in the Journal of the American Medical Association.

== Later life ==
McAfee died in 1941 from complications of a stomach operation.
