= Samuel A. Elbert =

American politician

- Born: April 9, 1832; Maryland
- Died: July 15, 1902 (aged 70); Indianapolis, Indiana
- Resting place: Crown Hill Cemetery and Arboretum, Section 20, Lot 7; 39.8172792°N 86.1753849°W
- Education: Studied at Oberlin College, Indiana Medical College 1869-1871
- Occupations: American physician and politician in Indiana
- Political party: Republican

Samuel A. Elbert (April 9, 1832 – July 15, 1902) was an American physician and politician in Indiana. He was the Republican nominee for a state house seat in 1882. He was the first African American to receive a medical degree in the state of Indiana.

== Biography ==
Samuel A. Elbert was born in Maryland to parents who were not enslaved. He worked as a servant, and studied at Oberlin College. He moved to Indianapolis in 1866 and taught at a private school for African Americans supported by the Allen Chapel.

He studied medicine with two doctors and enrolled at Indiana Medical College in 1869. After a dispute he was degreed by the college in 1871, appointed to the state board of health, and established a private medical practice.

He won the Republican nomination for a state house seat over incumbent James Sidney Hinton. He and other Republicans lost in the state's general election.

He married and had six children. He was a prominent A.M.E. Church member. He died at his home at 512 North Senate Avenue. In 2013 a grave marker was added at Crown Hill Cemetery for Elbert.
