= Florence Rose =

American birth control activist

- Born: June 20, 1903; New York, New York
- Died: April 26, 1969 (aged 65); Los Angeles, California
- Occupations: Non-profit executive, Secretary, Birth control activist, Sex educator

Florence Rose (June 20, 1903 – April 26, 1969) was an American birth control activist, perhaps best known for serving as the secretary of Margaret Sanger for more than a decade.

== Early life and education ==
Florence Rose, born in New York City on June 20, 1903, was the youngest of three children and the only daughter of Jewish Hungarian immigrants, Charles and Katie Rosebaum. Rose was raised along with her brothers Felix and Leon in Brooklyn. In addition to secretarial training, her education included study at both Hunter College and Columbia University, but it is not clear whether she ever completed a degree.

== Early career ==
After concluding her education, Rose held a variety of jobs that included sales, mail-order, and promotional work, often coupled with secretarial duties. From 1923 to 1929 she worked as a secretary and sales correspondent for the Larabee Flour Mills Corporation. In 1929, after she "spent one hot New York summer filing papers and then spent the next hot summer taking them all out," Rose determined that she "had to find something purposeful" and decided to move into public welfare work. As a first step in that direction she worked as the Administrative Assistant for the New York Citizens Street Traffic Committee during 1929 and 1930.

== Encountering Margaret Sanger ==
In July 1930, Rose gambled and wrote to the internationally known birth control pioneer Margaret Sanger—whom she admired but had never met—and explained that she wanted to "get out of a rut and change my present position while I am still young enough to be shaped into a really valuable assistant to some executive in a position that I can regard as life-long." She billed herself as an "intelligent, loyal assistant," offered Sanger her services, and pleaded with her for a brief meeting. As a result of this long shot, Sanger hired Rose to be her personal secretary and administrative assistant.

== Birth control movement ==
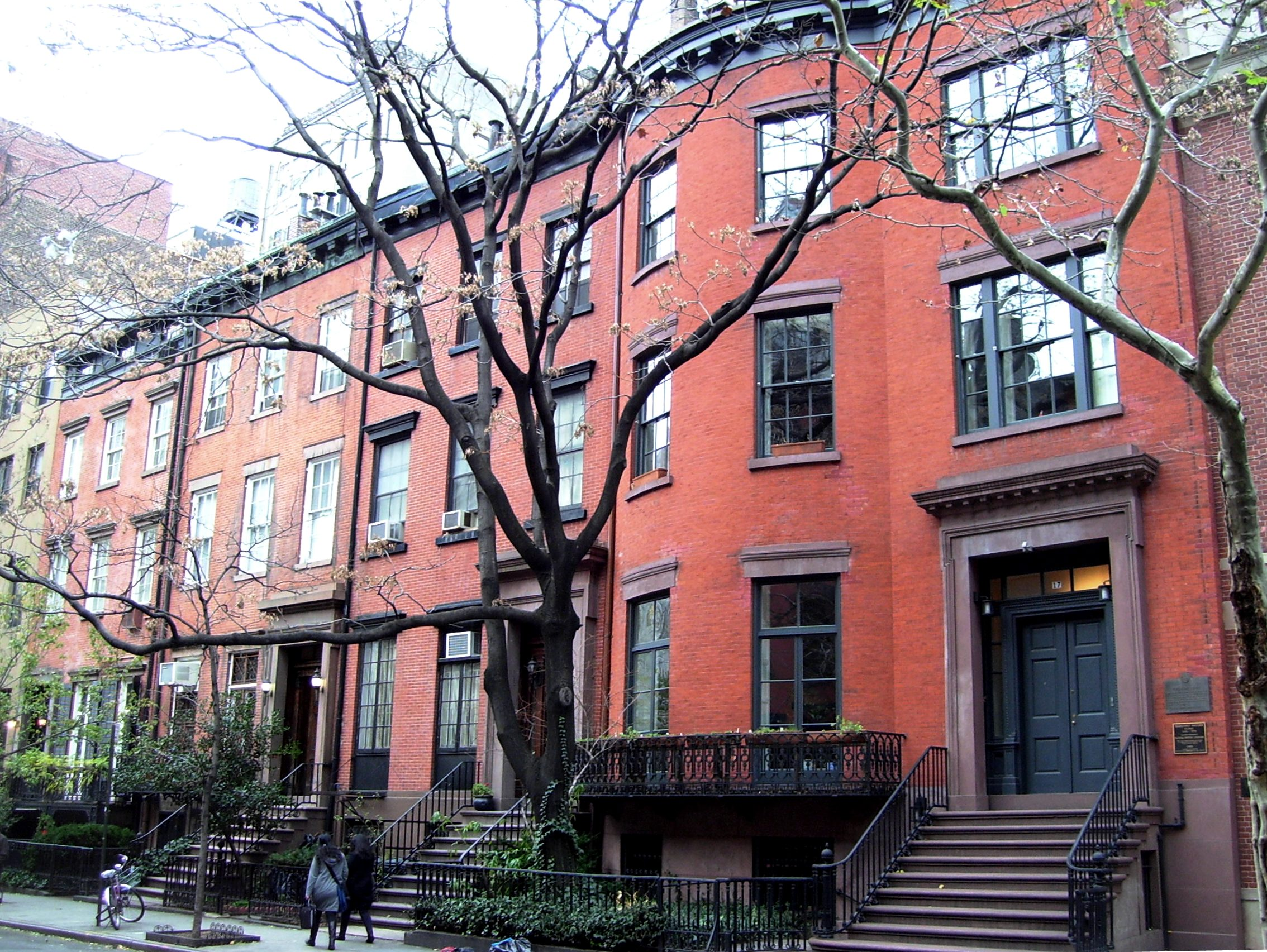
17-23 West 16th St. The Clinical Research Bureau operated here from 1930 to 1973; Rose worked at the Clinical Research Bureau from 1937 to 1939.

Florence Rose began her official work for Sanger in September 1930 and ultimately devoted the next thirteen years of her life to the cause of birth control. In addition to her work for Sanger, "Rosie," as she was affectionately known by her colleagues, also acted as the secretary to the National Committee on Federal Legislation for Birth Control from 1930 to 1937 and the Birth Control Clinical Research Bureau's Educational Department from 1937 to 1939. In that capacity she developed promotional materials, engaged in lobbying efforts, and coordinated national birth control conferences.

Wearing a wedding ring and calling herself "Mrs. Rose" to avoid the discrimination and harassment often encountered by single women traveling alone, Rose also toured the U.S. in 1933 to campaign for the repeal of the restrictive Comstock laws. In 1934 she accompanied Sanger on a visit to eleven European countries and the USSR and in 1937 she traveled to Asia to plan and coordinate public health conferences that would promote family planning. Rose became a minor celebrity after she survived the initial Japanese bombing of Shanghai and narrowly escaped war-torn China on a U.S. battleship with a few other American refugees in August 1937.

In 1939 the American Birth Control League and the Birth Control Clinical Research Bureau merged to become the Birth Control Federation of America (which would change its name to Planned Parenthood Federation of America in 1942). Having essentially achieved her goal of federal legislation to legalize birth control, Margaret Sanger formally retired and moved to her estate in Tucson. Though it was primarily her devotion to Sanger that had fueled Rose's work in the birth control movement, she stayed on in New York City after Sanger's retirement to work as a staff member in the Federation's Public Information Department.

In 1940, Florence Rose organized and convened the National Negro Advisory Council to give support and advice to projects aimed at serving Black Americans. Council members included Walter G. Alexander, Claude Barnett (Ida B. Wells's son), Michael J. Bent, Mary McLeod Bethune, M. O. Bousfield, Paul Comely, W. E. B. Du Bois, Crystal Bird Fauset, E. Franklin Frazier, Dorothy Ferebee, Charles Hubert, Charles S. Johnson, John Lawlah, Peter Marshall Murray, Rev. A. Clayton Powell, Ira De Augustine Reid, Bishop David A. Sims, Mabel Staupers, Mary Church Terrell, and Walter Francis White.

In 1941 she was appointed the director of the Special Projects Department which planned and developed new areas of activity. Rose can be largely credited with the development of Planned Parenthood's National Negro Educational Program, its National Clergyman's Advisory Council, and its Public Progress Committee.

== After Planned Parenthood ==
=== Foundation work and healthcare ===
In July 1943, after several years of tension and conflict with Planned Parenthood director Kenneth Rose (no relation), Florence Rose resigned from the organization. Following her resignation she worked briefly for the Holland-Rantos Company which manufactured contraceptives, organized Sanger's papers for the Library of Congress, and performed research for the New York philanthropist Ethel Clyde. She continued as an advocate for social change, writing in The New York Times about the problem of hunger among children in war-torn parts of the world.

From July 1944 until May 1945 Rose worked as a consultant to Pearl Buck who had recently founded the East and West Association to facilitate the interchange of knowledge between average men and women in Asia, the USSR, and the United States. Rose developed fundraising and promotional programs for the East and West Association during her brief association with Buck. She resigned from the job so that she could explore opportunities for employment in the West.

After recovering from a serious Labor Day automobile accident, in late 1945 Rose moved to Tucson, Arizona to take a job as the Assistant Business Administrator of the newly opened Tucson Medical Center. She resigned from the Tucson Medical Center after only one year on the job.

=== Meals for Millions ===
In the fall of 1946, she moved to Los Angeles to take over the leadership of the hunger relief and prevention organization Meals for Millions Foundation from its founder Clifford E. Clinton. As the executive director of Meals for Millions, Rose worked tirelessly from 1946 to 1964 to build the organization, raise funds, and promote the distribution of Multi-Purpose Food, a very inexpensive soy-based product that could provide nearly complete nutrition to starving people. Using the public relations skills she had learned in the birth control movement, Rose succeeded in popularizing Multi-Purpose Food, distributing 65,000,000 meals in 127 countries and establishing many international Meals for Millions Associations. After her retirement as executive director in 1964, Rose spent the next four years as the Meals for Millions overseas coordinator. During that time she traveled around the world to oversee the hunger relief and prevention programs she had set up earlier.

=== Family and friends ===
Rose took responsibility for the care of her ailing mother, who died in 1936. She maintained close relationships with her brother and sister-in-law, Leon and Rae Rose and participated in raising their children, Charles and Karen, including subsidizing their educations. Though she was long estranged from her brother Felix Rosenbaum (known in his adult life as Phil), she reconciled with him in the late 1950s when he was ill and down on his luck. Rose sent him advice and money regularly and, when he died in late 1961, it was she who arranged his funeral and put his affairs in order.

Rose also had a large circle of friends and colleagues throughout U.S. and the world. Despite the long distances that separated them, she maintained close relationships with friends she had made during her youth in New York. She also kept in touch with many of her friends and colleagues from the birth control movement. In addition to Leon and Rae Rose, her most important personal relationships over the course of her life were with her colleagues Margaret Sanger and Ernest Chamberlain.

== Personal life ==
Almost everyone who described Florence Rose remarked on her small stature (she was less than five feet tall), her energy, her enthusiasm, and her selfless dedication to the causes she championed. But despite her cheerful demeanor Rose experienced several episodes of depression during her adult life, some of them severe. In 1935 she offered to resign as Sanger's secretary because something had "gone wrong with the works" making her feel "utterly inadequate as a human being, ignorant of the most obvious matters to others, monstrously self-centered, and lacking in the most common decency and will-power to stop worrying others about her condition." Desperate, Rose sought help from various sources, including requesting prayers from the leaders of the Unity School of Christianity in Kansas City. After watching Rose deteriorate for several months, Margaret Sanger arranged a lengthy paid leave for her so she could travel to Arizona to rest and recover. Ultimately Rose obtained treatment for a previously undiagnosed thyroid deficiency which seemed to restore her mental health.

In 1968, facing a personal audit by the Internal Revenue Service and her final departure from Meals for Millions, Rose succumbed to another severe depression. This episode is not well-documented (Rose's papers include almost nothing generated by her after July 1968 when she began to mention feeling "paralyzed" and "dormant") but correspondence between others reveals the extent of her debilitation. In December 1968, Rose's longtime friend Henrietta Voorsanger wrote to Ernest Chamberlain to ask about Rose's "medical or mental condition," whether she had "qualified psychiatric care," and whether she was "able to live alone." Ernest Chamberlain described her final months of life as a "a despairing effort to regain her mental poise, outlook, and above all, enthusiasm." Unfortunately, this time Rose did not recover. She committed suicide on April 26, 1969.

In a 1968 interview with Mary Barber of the Los Angeles Times she said, "I do think I have an intuitive awareness of greatness in people and feel drawn to be their hands and legs. I want to free them to do the work they must do--great people must not spend time with dog work."

Florence Rose donated her papers to the Sophia Smith Collection at Smith College from 1961 to 1968. "After her death, her colleague Ernest Chamberlain oversaw the transfer of the documents that had remained in her possession. The bulk of the papers date from 1921 to 1970 and focus on Rose's personal and professional interests and activities."
