= Henry Watson Furniss =

US doctor and diplomat

Henry W. Furniss
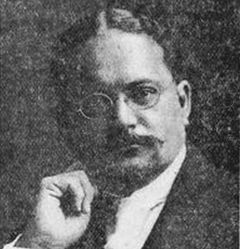

U.S. Envoy Plenipotentiary to Haiti
- In office November 23, 1905 – September 17, 1913
- President: Theodore Roosevelt
- Preceded by: William F. Powell
- Succeeded by: Madison R. Smith

Henry Watson Furniss (February 14, 1868 - December 20, 1955) was a medical doctor and diplomat from the United States.

== Early life and family ==
He was born in Brooklyn, New York, the son of William Henry Furniss who was appointed assistant secretary of state in Mississippi. In Jackson, Mississippi his brother, Sumner Alexander Furniss, was born in 1874. The family relocated to Indianapolis about 1880.

Furniss studied at Howard Medical School, the Harvard Medical School. He received his master's and a PhD in pharmacology from New York University Grossman School of Medicine.

In October 1903, he married Anna Wichmann in London, England.

== Career ==
In 1898, Furniss joined the U.S. Consular Service when he was appointed as consul to Bahia, Brazil. He worked as a physician and surgeon in Indianapolis before his appointment. He worked as a physician and surgeon in Indianapolis before his appointment. He stayed in the Consular Service for seven years. The Consular Service was part of the Department of State before 1924. They collected information for decision-makers and garnered support for U.S. policies. While in Brazil, Furniss contracted numerous illnesses that affected his health for the rest of his life.

In 1905, Theodore Roosevelt appointed him as ambassador to Haiti. The position was formally titled Envoy Extraordinary and Minister Plenipotentiary. It wouldn't be promoted to an ambassadorship until 1943. Furniss promoted American economic interests in Haiti while opposing U.S. imperialistic designs to take control of the country. Furniss resigned in 1913, as is customary with the change of administration.

In 1913 Furniss forwarded to Secretary of State William Jennings Bryan a message in support of Haiti's criticisms of the Banque Nationale de la République d’Haïti. In response to an article in the Haitian newspaper Le Matin, he stated that the bank had removed gold from circulation when demand was high, which caused farmers and merchants to borrow at high interest rates and then passed on these costs to workers and peasants. He also objected to its speculative use of government funds and to its transfer of gold to Paris before its debt was paid, since this reduced the amount of money available for lending within Haiti. Furniss questioned the extent of American diplomatic support for the bank, pointing out that it was still under French control even though American investors had taken part in it, and concluded that the Haitian government had "well-founded grounds for complaint". His dispatch was then sent on to the bank's officials for their remarks. Samuel McRoberts, a director of the Haitian bank and a officer of the National City Bank, disagreed with Furniss's evaluation, arguing that the institution carried out both commercial and government activities.

Furniss was one of the first African American men to be appointed as diplomatic envoy that had previously worked in a foreign service position. The New York Times reported on his work in Haiti in 1909. In 1909, Harry Johnston complimented Furniss and his ability to work with the "rotten" Haitian government in a letter to Roosevelt. Furniss was succeeded as ambassador to Haiti by Madison Roswell Smith in 1913.

== Later life and legacy ==
After leaving Haiti with his family, he settled in West Hartford, Connecticut. Furniss lived as a white man upon leaving the consular service. His granddaughter expressed surprise upon learning that he was African American when she was forty years old.

A 1908 photographic display by Cyrus Field Adams for the president and vice-president of the time included Furniss along with other prominent African American officials in U.S. government posts. Various diplomatic papers and medical writings of his are extant.

His brother Sumner also became a doctor, was involved in Indianapolis politics, and a leader for African American causes.
