= Todd Baron =

American gastroenterologist

Todd H. Baron
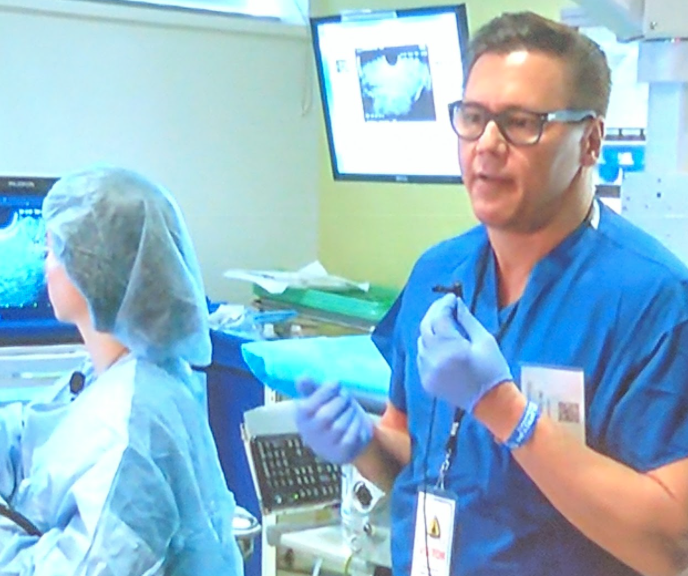
- Baron teaching at Johns Hopkins Hospital advanced endoscopy course in 2017
- Education: University of Florida; University of Alabama at Birmingham
- Occupation: Physician
- Employer: University of North Carolina School of Medicine
- Known for: Advanced endoscopy research

Todd Huntley Baron is an American gastroenterologist who is Professor of Medicine at the University of North Carolina School of Medicine. Additionally, he currently serves as the Director of Advanced Therapeutic Endoscopy within UNC's Division of Gastroenterology and Hepatology. He is known for his work in endoscopic retrograde cholangiopancreatography (ERCP), endoscopic ultrasound (EUS), and other advanced endoscopic procedures. He has developed interventional endoscopic techniques for the care of patients with gastrointestinal, liver and other medical conditions. He was the first to describe endoscopic drainage of the gallbladder, placement of a colonic stent, and endoscopic pancreatic necrosectomy.

== Early life and education ==
Baron was born in Danbury, Connecticut in 1960 and grew up in South Florida. In a 2025 autobiographical interview in iGIE, he described his older brother as an important childhood mentor. The brothers competed nationally in kart racing during the 1970s; Baron reported winning two International Kart Federation Grand National Championships. He later returned to karting and won the 2021 Cup Karts North America Grand National Championship in the Legends class.

Baron attended the University of Florida, where he was elected to Phi Beta Kappa, and received both his bachelor's and medical degrees there. He initially intended to pursue medical oncology. During his internal-medicine internship at the University of Alabama at Birmingham (UAB), a grand-rounds presentation on ERCP by Peter Cotton prompted him to pursue gastroenterology and pancreaticobiliary endoscopy.

== Medical career ==
Baron completed his internal-medicine residency, chief residency, and gastroenterology fellowship at UAB. Because UAB did not yet have an established ERCP program, the institution arranged for him to spend the third year of his fellowship at Duke University training in ERCP. He returned to UAB as a faculty member and established its ERCP program.

During his early UAB career, Baron began adapting guidewires, catheters, and self-expanding metal stents to gastrointestinal conditions outside their original uses. His 1996 series in Gastroenterology described endoscopic treatment of what the authors termed "organized pancreatic necrosis", now generally called walled-off pancreatic necrosis. The iGIE profile describes this as the first published account of endoscopic therapy for organized pancreatic necrosis.

Baron moved to the Mayo Clinic in Rochester, Minnesota, in 1998 and became director of pancreaticobiliary endoscopy. He spent one year at Mayo Clinic's Arizona campus before returning to Rochester. By the early 2010s, the increasing convergence of ERCP and therapeutic EUS led him to retrain in EUS in mid-career. He observed and trained at the Asian Institute of Gastroenterology in Hyderabad, India, in 2013, and subsequently undertook three months of diagnostic EUS training with Laurent Palazzo in Paris.

In 2014 Baron joined the University of North Carolina at Chapel Hill as professor of medicine and director of advanced therapeutic endoscopy. According to the iGIE interview, he established interventional EUS at UNC and developed a practice combining ERCP with EUS-guided interventions. Published work from this period included conversion of percutaneous cholecystostomy to internal EUS-guided gallbladder drainage and antegrade pancreatoscopy through an EUS-guided pancreaticogastrostomy.

Baron was an inaugural co-editor-in-chief of the open-access journal VideoGIE. He is also a co-editor of the textbook ERCP, whose fourth edition was published in 2024. His invited and review publications have included articles in The New England Journal of Medicine on acute necrotizing pancreatitis, gastrointestinal metal stents, antithrombotic management for invasive procedures, and interventional treatment of gallbladder disease.

== Training, mentorship, and professional development ==
Baron has identified several physicians as important teachers or mentors at different stages of his career. A 1987 lecture by British gastroenterologist Peter Cotton influenced his decision to specialize in ERCP, and Baron subsequently completed his formal ERCP training within Cotton's program at Duke. At UAB, esophagologist Joel E. Richter taught him clinical research and medical writing. Baron has described interventional endoscopist Richard A. Kozarek as an early clinical mentor whose experience with pancreatic-fluid collections helped inform Baron's later work on pancreatic necrosis.

=== Early ERCP practice at UAB ===
In the iGIE interview, Baron recalled completing approximately 135 ERCP procedures during his year at Duke and remaining concerned about beginning independent practice. He and his wife constructed a home training model from polyvinyl-chloride pipe, a plastic infant-feeding bottle, and tubing arranged to simulate the biliary and pancreatic orifices. Using a borrowed fiber-optic duodenoscope, he practiced cannulation on the model for approximately two hours per day before returning to UAB.

Baron established UAB's ERCP service while also covering inpatient, consultation, clinic, and Veterans Affairs responsibilities. UAB did not initially have a dedicated gastrointestinal fluoroscopy suite, so the service used a radiology fluoroscopy room after the day's diagnostic studies had finished. Baron recalled processing fluoroscopic films himself during complex cases because the endoscopy service did not have a dedicated radiologic technologist. He described these circumstances as contributing to a largely self-directed early practice in therapeutic ERCP.

=== Transition to therapeutic EUS ===
Baron attributed his decision to retrain in EUS to a 2012 live-endoscopy course in Rome. There he observed an EUS-guided choledochoduodenostomy performed with an electrocautery-enhanced lumen-apposing metal stent in a patient with combined duodenal and biliary obstruction. He later wrote that the demonstration made clear that therapeutic EUS would become increasingly important to pancreaticobiliary practice.

After an initial period observing EUS at the Asian Institute of Gastroenterology in Hyderabad, Baron trained with Mohan Ramchandani and Sundeep Lakhtakia in 2013. As part of his move from Mayo Clinic to UNC, he negotiated three additional months for intensive diagnostic EUS training with Laurent Palazzo in Paris. Baron said he deliberately emphasized diagnostic interpretation before applying his existing experience with needles, guidewires, catheters, and stents to therapeutic EUS.

=== Writing and documentation ===
At UAB, Joel E. Richter taught Baron to organize clinical observations and prepare medical manuscripts. Baron subsequently concentrated much of his scholarship on initial technical experiences, case reports, and retrospective clinical series rather than randomized trials. The iGIE profile connects this approach to publications ranging from early pancreatic-necrosis treatment to later EUS-guided rescue procedures.

Baron also shared an office at UAB with Basil Hirschowitz, a developer of the flexible fiber-optic endoscope. In the interview, Baron recalled Hirschowitz emphasizing the importance of maintaining clinical databases so that new procedures and their outcomes would be documented rather than lost. Baron cited that lesson when discussing the value of preserving the history of endoscopic innovation.

== Procedural reports and innovations ==
The 2025 iGIE historical profile credited Baron with several early or first published endoscopic procedures and traced them to their original reports.

=== Pancreatic necrosis ===
In the early 1990s, surgery and percutaneous radiologic drainage were the principal invasive treatments for pancreatic necrosis. While treating patients whose collections had initially been considered pseudocysts, Baron began using transgastric endoscopic access, plastic stents, and nasobiliary-tube irrigation to drain and debride mature necrotic collections. Working with radiologist Douglas Morgan, he used the term "organized pancreatic necrosis" for the delayed, encapsulated entity now generally called walled-off pancreatic necrosis. Their 1996 Gastroenterology series is described in the iGIE profile as the first published account of endoscopic therapy for the condition. Baron and Richard Kozarek later reviewed the development of the technique after two decades, by which time endoscopic approaches had become established components of multidisciplinary management.

=== Transrectal drainage of a diverticular abscess ===
Baron and Morgan reported endoscopic transrectal drainage in a patient with a diverticular abscess who was considered unable to tolerate surgery. The collection abutted the rectum but did not have a safe conventional percutaneous route. Using a flexible upper endoscope, Baron punctured the collection with a transbronchial aspiration needle, confirmed entry by aspirating pus and injecting contrast, passed a guidewire, dilated the tract, and placed a drainage catheter. The 1997 report was presented as the first endoscopic transrectal drainage of a diverticular abscess and anticipated later EUS-guided pelvic-collection drainage.

=== Enteral and colonic stenting ===
Before dedicated colonic stents were available in the United States, Baron adapted esophageal and tracheobronchial self-expanding metal stents to palliate malignant obstruction elsewhere in the gastrointestinal tract. His first colonic case involved obstruction from recurrent rectal cancer in a patient considered a poor candidate for an ostomy. The stent relieved the obstruction, after which Baron and collaborators assembled early series describing placement techniques, radiologic findings, and clinical outcomes. In the iGIE interview, Baron credited a colorectal-surgeon collaborator with suggesting the name "enteral Wallstent" for a device intended for use throughout the gastrointestinal lumen. That design became an early dedicated gastrointestinal stent platform.

=== Transduodenal gallbladder drainage ===
Baron and Mayo Clinic endosonographer Mark Topazian published the first reported endoscopic transduodenal gallbladder drainage in 2007. The patient had cholecystitis and unresectable hilar cholangiocarcinoma with pre-existing biliary metal stents, making transpapillary drainage difficult and leaving percutaneous drainage as the conventional alternative. The team used EUS-guided transduodenal access to internally drain the gallbladder. The report helped establish the conceptual basis for EUS-guided gallbladder drainage, which was later facilitated by lumen-apposing metal stents.

=== Drainage of an infected aortic aneurysm ===
In 2016 Baron and Eduardo Rodrigues-Pinto reported EUS-guided transesophageal drainage of an infected aneurysm after aortic stent-graft placement. The endoscope was used to access the para-aortic infected collection through the esophageal wall and establish internal drainage in a patient with limited conventional options. Baron presented the case at the World Cup of Endoscopy during Digestive Disease Week, where it won the competition. The iGIE profile used the case as an example of extending EUS-guided drainage beyond conventional gastrointestinal targets.

=== Later first-experience and rescue reports ===
The historical profile also highlighted reports in which Baron and collaborators adapted endoscopic access or EUS to unusual rescue situations. These included:

- Endoscopic resolution of Mirizzi syndrome by fragmenting an impacted cystic-duct stone and placing biliary stents.
- Description of a Wirsungocele, a cystic dilation of the intraduodenal portion of the main pancreatic duct.
- Endoscopic removal of necrotic splenic tissue through a transgastric tract.
- Endoscopic repair of a complete bile-duct transection using transpapillary cholangioperitoneoscopy to identify and bridge the disconnected duct.
- Intraperitoneal echoendoscopy to regain access and rescue a disrupted EUS-created gastrojejunal anastomosis.
- EUS-guided natural-orifice transluminal surgery to remove a toothpick embedded in the liver.
- EUS-guided creation of an ileocolonic anastomosis to bypass complete small-bowel obstruction.
- EUS-guided gastric-varix embolization using coils and a self-assembling peptide matrix.

The iGIE interview characterizes these reports as examples of Baron's emphasis on publishing initial technical experiences. Many were case reports or small series intended to demonstrate feasibility rather than comparative trials, a distinction noted in the profile itself.

== Professional leadership and recognition ==
Baron has held leadership roles in professional societies and endoscopy publishing. He chaired the Standards of Practice Committee of the American Society for Gastrointestinal Endoscopy (ASGE) and served as president of the international Society of Gastrointestinal Intervention. A 2012 SGI program listed Baron, then at Mayo Clinic, as the society's president-elect and described the organization as a multidisciplinary forum for endoscopists, interventional radiologists, and surgeons.

Baron and interventional radiologist Ziv Haskal were the founding co-editors-in-chief of the journal Gastrointestinal Intervention, which developed from the Society of Gastrointestinal Intervention. He later served as an inaugural co-editor-in-chief of ASGE's open-access video journal VideoGIE.

In 2010, ASGE presented Baron with its Master Endoscopist Award, which recognizes expertise and sustained contributions to clinical gastrointestinal endoscopy. In 2023 he received the society's Rudolf Schindler Award. ASGE describes the Schindler Award as its highest honor, recognizing accomplishments in endoscopic research, teaching, or service.

At the 2016 Digestive Disease Week World Cup of Endoscopy, Baron presented the EUS-guided drainage of an infected aortic aneurysm while dressed as Captain America. The case won the international video competition. The 2025 iGIE historical profile cited the presentation as a conspicuous example of Baron's willingness to use endoscopic techniques outside their conventional applications.
