= Greenvillage, Pennsylvania =

Unincorporated community in Pennsylvania, U.S.

Coordinates: 39°59′35″N 77°36′30″W

Green Village is an unincorporated community in Franklin County, in the U.S. state of Pennsylvania.

== History ==
Greenvillage was platted in 1793, and named after Greene Township. Variant names were "Greene Village" and "Greenvillage". A post office called Green Village was established in 1813, and remained in operation until 1915.
