= No más bebés =

No Más Bebés
- Theatrical release poster. Maria Hurtado in the maternity ward of Los Angeles County-USC Medical Center
- Directed by: Renee Tajima-Peña
- Produced by: Virginia Espino
- Distributed by: PBS
- Release dates: June 14, 2015 (Los Angeles Film Festival); February 1, 2016
- Country: United States
- Languages: English and Spanish

No Más Bebés (transl. No More Babies) is an American documentary film that tells the story of immigrant women who were sterilized upon going into labor. Having been sterilized without knowing at the Los Angeles County-USC Medical Center, the mothers sued county doctors, the State of California, and the United States government. Having collected hospital records from a whistleblower, Chicana lawyer Antonia Hernandez led the lawsuit against powerful institutions.

== Plot summary ==
The documentary introduces several mothers involved in the Madrigal v. Quilligan trial who recount the day they were sterilized, what their dreams and aspirations concerning family had been beforehand, and their involvement in fighting for Chicana rights. Family members are also introduced throughout, many having just learned about the sterilizations performed on their loved ones.

The history of coercive sterilization, focusing on the sterilization of Latina women, is the main theme of the documentary.

No Más Bebés transitions to focusing on Madrigal v. Quilligan, introducing Antonia Hernandez as the lawyer in charge of the case and detailing the obstacles she faced in building a case against the powerful institutions that were on trial. The documentary comes to a close with ruling of the trial in favor of the hospital and the final thoughts of the figures in the documentary. Video and news clips from the 1970s concerning the women, the court case, and the hospital appear throughout the documentary.

== Characters ==
=== Mothers ===
Consuelo Hermosillo: Originally from Veracruz, Mexico, and known for her cooking skills in her son's restaurant, Hermosillo was always the one fighting for the rights of her children and community, making her well known within her neighborhood. She loves children and wanted 4 or 5. She was sterilized at 23. The doctors made her sign in a gurney while experiencing a lot a pain and discomfort after giving birth. Next to her signature was "No mas bebes por vidas". She joined the court case, but originally didn't think Ms. Antonia could accomplish anything. Hermosillo was shocked when Hernandez had made it so far with the case. During her recorded interview with Prof. Ibanez, she described how she always dreamt that she had her baby and that she would go to Mexico and people would always want to see him. "A miracle that nobody else can have". The operation made Consuelo feel not as brave as she used to feel.

María Hurtado: A strong willed woman who found way to cross the traditional boundaries of the role of Chicana women. Her strong relationship with her husband, who she has been married to for 51 and half years, is evident throughout the film, many clips depicting the two dancing. Because she was not fluent in English, her five children would translate for her. The Hurtados had valued family and had plans to have a large family. She joined the lawsuit immediately after Antonia Hernandez had asked her to "Keep fighting for what you want"

Dolores Madrigal: Dolores and her husband were factory workers that saved up for their family and house. After learning about the sterilization several weeks after it occurred, her relationship with her husband became strained, who directed his anger at her verbally and physically. He had started to drink after the sterilization occurred. He would say, "Women do this to be with other men and their husbands never found out". She was the lead plaintiff in the historic civil rights trial. Her son found out about the sterilization during the production of the film.

Maria Figueroa: Living in East LA, a family-oriented women that was always with her children when not at work. Like the other mothers, Maria's life was changed when she was sterilized, affecting her life and marriage. She chose to stay in her marriage for her children, and almost went as far as attempting suicide because of the effects the sterilization had on her marriage and mental state. After informing her husband of her sterilization, he told her that she could not conduct any interviews or testify.

Melvina Hernández: A homeworker who was sterilized at the age of 23 and did not find out until four years later. She was told to sign a paper that was in English for a C-section that was needed if the doctor was going to "save her and the baby". Hernandez refused, because her husband was not present, but the nurse told her to sign or she would die. The nurse ended up grabbing her hand and signed the paper for her.

=== Attorneys ===
Antonia Hernandez: Civil Rights attorney. A UCLA Law School Graduate, Hernandez immigrated from Mexico and grew up in East LA. Employed at the Los Angeles Center for Law and Justice (LACLJ), she was one of the two attorneys who filed Madrigal v. Quilligan at the age of 26. She decided to file the case after Dr. Rosenfeld landed in the legal aids office. Hernandez would spend her time driving up and down Lincoln Heights in East LA, trying to find the mothers, many of whom their statute of limitation had ended. Ms. Antonia felt that the only way to go to court was to file a class action lawsuit to claim that the women's right to have babies was denied. She later became the President of the Mexican American Legal Defense and Education Fund and is now the CEO of the California Community Foundation.

Nancy Menzies Vaessen: Doctor's Defense attorney. Was able to file a motion that dismissed Dr. Quilligan and Dr. Roger Freeman from the case for not having direct responsibility and not being present during the sterilizations. "You have to look at what the facts are....that's why documentation is so important"

Charles Nabarrete: A graduate of UCLA law school, Nabarrete was the lead attorney for the Madrigal case.

Jovit Rivera: Plaintiff. Rivera believed that the ruling was saying that nothing had happened.

Hon. Jesse Curtis Jr.: The federal judge that decided the outcome of Madrigal vs. Quilligan. He found the defendants not guilty and that "the cultural background of these particular women has contributed to the problem" of these sterilizations taking place.

=== Doctors ===
Dr. Edward James Quilligan: (County hospital obstetrician) Known as a pioneer in the field of maternal fetal medicine, Dr. Quilligan is well regarded by his peers. During the time of the women's’ sterilizations and the trial, Quilligan was the head of the Women's Hospital at LAC+USC Medical Center after coming from Yale. As the main defendant in the Madrigal trial, he denied and claimed that he was unaware of the multiple accounts of forced sterilization that took place in USC. He denied pushing for family planning on any specific group. "If you see a patient for the first time who is in labor who has a large number of children and one of the things you discuss with her is the possibility of tubal ligation, I think it's perfectly appropriate"

Dr. Bernard Rosenfeld: Early into his residency, Dr. Rosenfeld was suspicious of the forced sterilizations by tubal ligation. Rosenfeld chose to speak out and collected files on the sterilizations performed and conversations he had on the matter, despite being ignored by many of his colleagues. Every day. he would type letters explaining what was going on in USC. Rosenfeld would also record conversations between doctors, some having a stereotypical view of the Hispanic community. He complained to Quilligan at least three times, but the problem was never stopped. He provided evidence against the hospital to Nabarette and Hernandez. As a whistleblower, Rosenfeld was let go by the hospital and ostracized over the years. The hospital went to the extent of trying to revoke his license by claiming that he gave hospital information to a third party. "He could've stopped the problem completely.....but it kept happening" "No private doctor would ever go up to a woman in a private hospital while she was in labor about having her tubes tied"

Dr. Karen Benker: An obstetric technician conducting rounds at USC during the times of the sterilizations from 1967 to 1971, during her time there, she was exposed to the many members of staffs attitudes towards the sterilizations of minority women. On one account, she described how she was on an obstetrics rotation and Dr. Quilligan took the doctors on a tour and declared that the hospital had gotten a grant to see how far they could cut the negro and Mexican. She testified of the doctors wrongdoings in Madrigal vs. Quilligan.

Dr. Jerry Neuman: A former medical student at USC hospital, when he first came to LA, he was not familiar with Latin culture at all. After having orientation for an hour, he was sent out to start his work in the hospital. As a defendant in the Madrigal vs. Quilligan case, Neumann believed he was doing nothing wrong and had not sterilized anyone through coercion. He claimed it was "horrible to have your name splashed on the front page of the LA Times, having headlines questioning your motives.

Dr. Howard Blanchette A former medical student that was at USC during the sterilization incidents

Dr. Michael Kreitzer A former medical student at USC and defendant in Madrigal vs. Quilligan. He was offended by the idea that the sterilizations they performed were aimed at performing sterilization on Mexicans who were seen as unable to take care of their kids. "Nothing could be further from the truth"

=== Professors ===
Professor Elena Gutierrez: An associate professor of Latin American and Latino Studies Program and Gender Studies & Women's Studies Program at the University of Illinois at Chicago. In the film, she discussed the message of the infamous book, The Population Bomb by Stanford University Professor Paul R. Ehrlich. She describes the book as a call to stop having so many births.

Professor Alexandra Stern A historian from the University of Michigan's American Culture department. Provided history on the concept and reasonings behind the major push for family planning in the '70s in the United States.

Professor Carlos Velez-Ibanez An expert witness and anthropologist that graduated from UCLA and is currently the Regents Professor of the School of Transborder Studies at Arizona State University. He conducted several interviews for Hernandez and Nabarette. He had received a call from Hernandez about what the effects of sterilization would have on the women, and Ibanez responded that they would be serious. Ibanez claims that the judge used him during the trial to justify the reasoning that the doctors would not have known about the effects of sterilization on if it took him, an anthropologist, 6 months to figure it out.

=== Activist ===
Gloria Molina: Molina was a legal secretary and president of Comisión Femenil Mexicana Nacional when the nascent feminist organization signed on as class representatives for the lawsuit. She oversaw the reform and reconstruction at LAC+USC. She would go on to have a successful career in politics.

=== Journalist ===
Claudia Dreifus: A journalist that provided historical context for the documentary. She described that during the time of the trial, women were strongly beginning to ask about their reproductive rights, but people were not considering coerced sterilization. She also interviewed Dr. Quilligan and described him as not understanding what was moderately problematic about the sterilizations. "He felt that him or those under him did anything wrong"

Frank Cruz: Cruz was the only TV reporter that covered the Madrigal v. Quilligan trial as the first Latino anchor on the Los Angeles television news. Before television, he taught Chicano history. He is currently a member of the Board of Trustees of USC.

== Impact of sterilizations in women in film ==
Some of the women felt as if the sterilizations had ended their lives and their husbands would leave them, because they were no longer "women". When Antonia Hernandez interviewed/talked to the mothers, the subject would be changed when the husband was present. They would then tell Hernandez not to bring up the subject again. The women would be coerced into signing the paper by phrases such as, "Want the shot to take away the pain? Sign, no más dolor". "You better sign those paper, or your baby could probably die here."

== Family planning ==
Family planning was a major push in the '70s to control population growth and supply, especially minority women, access to health services that they previously did not have before. Large sums of money came through the government to promote the plan. Public institutions were allowed to apply for money from federal programs. Because the flow of money was not controlled, it led to the problems around coerced sterilization of minorities in hospitals. There were many rushed labors in the hospital and women would sign consensus forms for tubal ligation without reading the document. Women would go to the county hospitals to give birth, with some of them leaving sterilized without their knowledge. Using the phrase "tying of the tubes" misinformed people believing that tubes could become untied. They did not know that their tubes were ultimately cut.

== Madrigal vs. Quilligan: important details from the film ==
- Built under Roe v. Wade.
- The women who signed on as plaintiffs agreed that their stories would go public for the first time
- Took a year and a half to prepare the case
- Described as Goliath versus David
- California had one of highest sterilization rates, if not the highest
- June 1971–March 1974, coercive sterilization
- Cased filed in 1975 by 10 Chicana women (Plaintiffs)
- Defendants: Dr. Quilligan and obstetricians at USC
- Decision made on June 7, 1978 (Central District of California)
- Affirmed by the Court of Appeals of the Ninth Circuit
- Federal class-action suit
- Case not subject to a jury
- Wanted compensation, sterilization counseling, and consent forms in Spanish
- Doctors accused of having intention to lower birth rate of Mexican women in California, controlling populations
- Violation of civil and constitutional rights to bear children
- Ruling, judge sided with hospital: no deliberate intent of the doctors to hurt the women.
- Women unknowingly signed the paperwork in exchange to receive pain medication after giving birth. Others were also told that the process could be reversed, told that "tubes would be tied"
- Women were working class, independent of government assistance
- Case was prompted during the Chicana movement, which clashed with the chicano and women's liberation movement. Because the Chicano movement was led by men who had a very sexist approach, they say the needs of the women only secondary to ending racism. In regards to the Women's liberation movement, while chicanas wanted to have truly informed consent with a waiting period, white feminists opposed this. Instead, they wanted consent straight away. They did not take into account whether the individual could speak English, and could fully comprehend the purpose of a sterilization.

== Outcome ==
- Changed ways things have been done
- Forms in different languages, including Spanish made available
- Patients under the age of 21 would have 72 hours to make decision
- Welfare benefits would not be revoked
- Minorities better informed of their rights regarding sterilization
- Establishment of MALDEF CRP in 1974.
- Bilingual counselors provided at county hospitals

== Sterilization in California ==
- Conducted the most sterilizations in the United States
- Responsible for at least a quarter of the coerced sterilizations in USA
- Passed sterilization law in 1909 and was unopposed for next 70 years
- In total, 3 laws were passed in California concerning sterilization
- Mexicans were specifically targeted, because it was stereotypically thought that they were diseased and carried tuberculosis
- Fueled by immigration anxiety
- Targeted by the traditional idea of large Mexican American families
- Sterilization legislation used by Nazi Germany
- Eugenics was seen as a way to protect society from the offspring of those deemed inferior
- Performed 20,000 sterilizations, one-third of those in the nation, 1900s–1970s
- Leader in eugenics movement
- Pacific Colony (later known as Lanterman Developmental Center), "feeble-mindedness"
- Sterilization bill granted superintendents to asexualize would improve inmate or patient physically, mentally, or morally
- Family planning services and population research act, "birth curb bill" passed. Funding for sterilizations

== Production ==
Co-Production of Moon Canyon Films, and the Independent Television Service (ITVS), in association with Latino Public Broadcasting (LPB) with funding provided by the Corporation for Public Broadcasting (CPB), and Chicken & Egg Pictures. Executive Producer for LPB – Sandra Pedlow. Executive Producer for ITVS - Sally Jo Fifer.

== Awards and nominations ==
- Nalip Opening Film 2015
- Official Selection DOC NYC 2015
- Official Selection 2015 Ambulante Documentary Film Festival
- Official Selection Austin Film Festival 2015
