= Sterilization of Latinas =

Sterilization of Latinas has targeted women of different Latin American identities, including those from Puerto Rico and Mexico for many years in the United States. There is a significant history of such sterilization practices being conducted involuntarily, in a coerced or forced manner, as well as in more subtle forms such as that of constrained choice. Coerced sterilization is defined as any sterilization procedure performed without the patient's full, free, and informed consent. This includes procedures carried out through misinformation, language barriers, or under conditions of institutional pressure. The sterilization of Latinas in the United States is rooted in eugenic ideology and racial discrimination. It has a long history of targeting marginalized groups including women of ethnic and racial minorities, women with disabilities, women with HIV and poor women. Coercive sterilization has also been widley recognized as a violation of fundamental human rights and bodily autonomy. Additionally, forced sterilization was permissible by multiple states throughout various periods in the 20th century. Issues of state sterilization have persisted as recently as September 2020. Some sources credit the practice to theories of racial eugenics.

== Background ==
The development of eugenics in the United States during the late nineteenth and early twentieth centuries created a foundation for policies targeting marginalized populations for sterilization. Eugenic ideology promoted the belief that sterilization would prevent "undesirable" children from being born. Undesirable traits correlated with reproductive fitness which included race and ethnicity. In the late nineteenth and early twentieth century, the immigration rates in the United States spiked along with the reproduction rates in immigrant families. This provoked a deeper fear from eugenicists that native born Americans and Americans with strong reproductive fitness would be outnumbered by immigrants who possess a low reproductive fitness. This fear became ingrained into many Americans across the nation and became fuel for the sterilization of Latinas movements in the twentieth century.

Latina women were particularly vulnerable to eugenic sterilization policies due to racialized beliefs that cast them as inferior and unfit to reproduce. In California, eugenics programs were tied to broader efforts to reduce immigration from Mexico. Mexican American women were stereotyped as excessively fertile, unfit parents, criminally inclined, and intellectually inferior. Figures in support of Eugenics advocated for and promoted these beliefs to the public. Charles M. Goethe played a key role in popularizing eugenic ideas in California, and he founded the Eugenics Society of Northern California. He framed Latino immigrants, particularly those from Mexico, as threats to the nation's social and genetic "fitness." He promoted sterilization as a means of racial and social improvement.

Some of the factors that may catapulted the movement behind the sterilization abuse in Latina women in the state of California, began with one of the earliest organizations in eugenic sterilizations in the U.S., the Human Betterment Foundation (HBF), the Sterilization Act of 1909, and the Immigration Act of 1924. The California Act of 1909 was one of the major legal and political influences that established authority for doctors and psychiatrists of state hospitals and mental institutions to perform sterilizations on the people unfit to function in society because of their intelligence levels, presumed future deviant behavior and sexual activity. With that established, organizations such as the Human Betterment Foundation came to be the organization that held these ideologies and promote eugenic sterilizations and the Immigration Act of 1924 further developed the idea that labor-migrants were needed, but women and children were not as there was a fear of Latino and Immigrant invasion.

=== The Human Betterment Foundation (1929–1942) ===
The Human Betterment Foundation operated in California from 1929 to 1942. In those years, the foundation specialized in researching eugenic sterilizations effects, providing literary contributions of their findings to the public. The foundation distributed literature, such as this in order to promote the efficacy of sterilizations among socially- Sterilizations during this time were promoted and imposed in state institutions.

In the pamphlet, the organization describes that the problem is families living on government assistance or "public charity" use more of the public charity than those families sustaining themselves more by 50 percent. The pamphlet stated that families whose children ended up in state homes were increasingly doubling, at a fast rate. The foundation too states that additional children to the state is a burden, but also that taxation rates were increasing because of more children being in need along with the notion that with more children from unfit parents would increase crime and delinquency rates.

And another example of anti-Latino sentiment was with state authorities when dealing with minorities. Immigrants that were feeble minded and at borderline intelligence were of the undesirable type. California's state authorities wrote in a survey conducted by the California State Board of Charities and Corrections that Latinos of low intelligence or mental sanity were of the undesirable types. State institutions that were allowed to perform sterilizations on patients that seemed like the perfect candidate, was very common. Current research shows that Latinas were targets for sterilization at higher rates than white women. The disproportion among sterilization rates in the Latino community could not be quantified in its current time, but data from sterilization forms suggest that 88 percent of Californians with a Spanish last name were of Mexican origin and descent. The surnames of people in forms recommending institutionalized patients between 1920 and 1945 shows that Latino were more likely to be sterilized than non-Latino men and Latina women experienced sterilization at higher rates than non-Latina women. This data shows that there was an unfair application of the California law that allowed institutions to take health measures for other people on their behalf.

=== The California Sterilization Act of 1909 ===
This law passed in California in 1909, authorized medical staff like doctors and medical superintendents to perform sterilization procedures on both men and women deemed as feeble-minded, whose mental diseases, IQ, and intelligence could be passed down to future generations. A survey in mental deviations in prisons, public schools, and orphanages in California institutions reported worriness of feeble-mindedness and relation of intelligence to previous delinquency record. In their survey, they found that California had drawn a large proportion of immigrants of undesirable types and would therefore recommend them to sterilization processes. Statistical evidence demonstrates that there the number of sterilizations were disproportionate to racial and ethnic minorities, such as people of low class and female gender. Research also suggests that Latina women were targeted at significantly higher rates than non-Latinas. A 2018 study by Novak and colleagues analyzed over 17,000 forms recommending institutionalized patients for sterilization between 1920 and 1945. The researchers found that Latinas had a 59% greater risk of sterilization compared to non-Latinas. These findings of disproportionate sterilization represent how eugenic thinking reinforced racial stereotypes that portrayed Latinas as inferior and unfit to reproduce.

=== Immigration Act of 1924 ===
Anti-miscegenation laws, along with the Immigration Act of 1924, contributed to the anti-immigrant sentiment that existed during the development of United States history. At this point in time, the United States was concerned with foreigners coming into the country in higher numbers and therefore enforced its first border patrol and regulated the number of foreign immigrants from south and eastern Europe, as well as permitting people from the southern people specialized in agriculture and work from the southern border. In the forgotten narrative of Latin American History, U.S., Mexican immigrants and citizens were labeled and seen as a problem in society because they were seen as hyper-fertile and supported theories that Mexicans were of a lower racial level. By the first half of the 20th century, almost 60,000 people had been sterilized under the different U.S. Eugenics Programs implemented.

== Sterilization by ethnicity ==
=== Puerto Rican women ===
The history of sterilizations in the United States and Puerto Rico can be defined as an intersectional form of oppression that connects race, class, and sex to the social, political, and economic status of Puerto Ricans. The oppressive nature of these procedures lie within the fact that they were politically backed and used within the court of law against Puerto Ricans. Other women on the island experienced an increase in surveillance and control of their body within social realms. This illustrates how sterilizations were conducted on a continuum and had vast as well as long lasting consequences. In 1947, 7% of mothers aged 20–49 received tubal ligation which almost doubled in 1954 as sterilizations increased on the island to 16%. By 1965, over 34% of Puerto Rican women within this age bracket received sterilizations, which is five times the rate two decades prior. Sterilization was the most heavily promoted method of contraception in Puerto Rico and was legitimized by concerns of population, which can be associated with the same concerns of race and class that date back to the island's annexation.

After the US gained ownership of Puerto Rico, it was viewed as a province in urgent need of a way to prevent greater poverty and population rates. This heavily influenced the US decision to begin sterilizing Puerto Rican women and implementing experimental birth control methods. Puerto Rican women in particular have served as test subjects for various contraceptive studies in the United States, of which included involuntary sterilization. Many Puerto Rican women were sterilized from the 1930s to the 1970s in order to decrease poverty and population growth in Puerto Rico.

==== Population and poverty crisis ====
Concerns about the population density in Puerto Rico can be traced back to 1898 when Puerto Rico became a US colony. These concerns from scholars, scientist, and government officials inform the thought process behind the association between poverty, health, and economy with population throughout the 20th century.

When Americans began to occupy the island of Puerto Rico, they asserted more than their ideals and beliefs. American colonizers asserted absolute dominance over Puerto Rico due to the idea of Manifest Destiny, which greatly shifted the dynamics of the island. The U.S. capitalized on the fact that Puerto Rico utilized a large fraction of its resources to gain independence from Spain, which left the island's economy depleted. During this time, many Puerto Ricans lost land while their natural resources became exploited. In the mid-1920s, Puerto Rico's dependency on the production of sugar, devastated the island when the sugar market collapsed. Additionally, the nationwide economic depression in 1927 exacerbated the effects of this collapse as well as the overall stability of the island. In 1928, Puerto Rico suffered the consequences of a hurricane in San Felipe. The Okeechobee Hurricane resulted in over 300 deaths and property damages ranging from $50-$80 million, while the agricultural market also suffered. In the 1930s, Puerto Rican citizens began to experience the adverse health effects of tuberculosis, malaria, diarrhea-enteritis, hookworm, and dietary-deficiencies that were responsible for over 40 percent of deaths. This later on gave medical professionals grounds to support sterilization on the island.

Furthermore, these factors resulted in immense and widespread poverty. Many Puerto Ricans faced perpetual hunger and growing unemployment rates. In 1930, the median family income was reported to be approx. $250 a year and "economically productive families" were attributing around 94% of their income toward acquiring food. Additionally, 27% of the labor force was unemployed.

The current state of Puerto Rico confirmed the ideals Americans projected in the midst of the island's annexation about the longevity and potential of Puerto Rico. Puerto Ricans were once again viewed as ignorant and devious as they participated in "reckless breeding" in the midst of this economic downward spiral. This caused many Americans and a fraction of Puerto Ricans to believe that overpopulation essentially was the cause of the wide variety of problems on the island.

Messages about Puerto Rico's increase in population began to spread rapidly by citizens, government officials, scientist, and industrial leaders/capitalist. In 1899, the population of Puerto Rico was less than a million and in 1917 was half of the population size that it would be four decades later. In the 1930s, Puerto Rico had a population growth rate of approximately 1.5%, while fertility rates were lower than developed and industrialized nations. According to Puerto Rico's planning report decades later, the island's population has grown from 687 people per square mile in 1960 to 793 in 1970. This growth continued as the population was 815 people per square mile in 1972, 863 people per square mile in 1973, and 871 people per square mile in 1974. Concurrently, the death rate decreased to 6.5 per 1,000 persons as the birth rate the year before was 23.3. As the population grew by 2 percent each year, Puerto Rico was predicted to have a total population of 4,339,000 by the year 2000, or 1,300 people per square mile. The current and predicted rates of population growth provoked a high level of concern, which made birth control the primary solution for health concerns, poverty, and this idea of overpopulation.

==== Operation bootstrap (1948) ====
Operation Bootstrap was enacted in 1948 and was the result of Puerto Rico's desire to attract outside capital by inviting U.S. private funds. Therefore, a tax arrangement was made by the U.S. to improve the industrial production on the island in an effort to increase profits and funnel money to the mainland. This economic development program enticed industries within the U.S. that were in search of "cheap labor, tax exemptions, and free trade between Puerto Rico and the mainland".

This rapid foreign investment provided promise for disadvantaged Puerto Rican women who were struggling to navigate through domestic working conditions and limited job opportunities. Operation Bootstrap was marketed and believed to be an advantageous new service sector for women in search of white collar jobs. However, Puerto Rican women and the vast majority of the island experienced the exact opposite. Operation Bootstrap resulted in "high unemployment, increased migration, exacerbated poverty", and most importantly, economic colonization.

==== Coerced and forced sterilizations ====
United Nations Special Rapporteur on Violence against Women defines forced sterilizations as "a method of medical control of an individual's fertility without consent". Another source adds that sterilization abuse is "any procedure completed without the patient knowing they are being sterilized" as well as "when the patient is coerced or deceived in order to obtain the consent to the procedure". Many Puerto Rican women were manipulated through incorrect information, language barriers, incentivization, testing, and withholding information as they knowingly or unknowingly consented to sterilization. Although, in some cases sterilization was completely voluntary and consented. In fact, the Puerto Rican government conducted a study that stated that 83 percent of 3000 families supported sterilizations that were free. In 1968, 75 percent of the women that had sterilizations were upper and middle-class women that could afford the $100-$125 procedure. Although, the term "family" does not specifically state the perspective of the woman. Lastly, it is important to recognize that sterilization was a choice that was made in the setting of a few or no alternatives. As mentioned earlier, sterilization was the most promoted and harmful form of contraception in Puerto Rico.

Due to a lack of educational materials distributed in Puerto Rico, many women had misconceptions about tubal ligations. For example, one common misconception about sterilization is that the procedure is not permanent. A 1968 study reported that over one-third of Puerto Rican women were not aware that tubal ligation was permanent or irreversible. Some doctors did not even request consent while other doctors threatened to not deliver the baby right before delivery unless the mother consented to sterilization after birth. If mothers were receiving government assistance, many women were threatened to have their welfare terminated.

Additionally, the U.S. government and institutions worked collaboratively to incentivize sterilizations. Many doctors and hospital administrators began to encourage sterilizations due to the fact that the Joint Committee for Hospital Accreditation refused to accredit hospitals in Puerto Rico "unless a ten percent limit of sterilization (in proportion to all hospital deliveries) was agreed upon". In the 1930s, Puerto Rican women began to occupy jobs within factories. The women working in these factories felt an immense amount of pressure to undergo a sterilization to prove to employers that their pregnancy would not deter them from completing their job. This same year, approximately three sugar plantations housed birth control clinics and discriminated against women that were not sterilized as they refused employment to women who would not get the procedure. Puerto Rican women on sugar plantations were discriminated against while others were incentivized to alter their reproductive capacity to become the ideal responsible and dependable female worker.

Coercive strategies experienced in the delivery room and at work, were also entrenched in the process of clinical trials for birth control pills in 1955. These trials took place in poor areas in Puerto Rico like San Juan. Outside of San Juan, the Common Wealth Health Department controlled more than 19 free clinics. These clinics were reported to be operating at full capacity as approximately 1,000 sterilizations were completed a month. Within these clinics, low socioeconomic women were unknowingly being used as test subjects. Class inequality was apparent during these trials due to educated middle-class women fearing the side effects and refusing to try the new medication while poor-less educated women unknowingly became test subjects out of desperation to avoid pregnancy and ultimately sterilization. On many occurrences, these pills such as Enovid, contained an unusually high quantity of hormones compared to 21st century birth control pills. Doctors disregarded women that reported nausea, blood clotting, and depression. Three women allegedly died during the underground testing of this pill, but their deaths were never put to trial or investigated. In the mainland, testing for this pill, Enovid, continued and was approved in 1957 regardless of dangerous and adverse side effects. Additionally, poor Puerto Rican women in Ryder Memorial Hospital were tested on for six different variations of birth control along with the IUD in the 1960s. These same women were also subject to extremely long and extensive interviews so that the Population Council's International Population Program could document their marital and fertility histories. This same secrecy and oppression was experienced by Puerto Rican women as they were unknowingly being tested for the Depo Privera shot and contraceptive foam. Once the implications of sterilizations became more widely known, many women opted to take other forms of contraception during the dangerous phases of development to avoid the permanent procedure.

==== Law 116, Puerto Rico ====
In 1937, Law 116 legalized sterilization in Puerto Rico. This law implemented Eugenics Boards within 32 states that oversaw compulsory sterilizations. More specifically, the Puerto Rican Eugenics Boards reviewed and confirmed petitions from the government and private entities to inflict sterilizations amongst the perceived "insane", "feeble minded", "diseased", and "dependent". The purpose of the Puerto Rican Eugenics Board was to regulate the reproductive capacities of "socially inferior" and perceived undesirable Puerto Ricans. This led the Puerto Rican Eugenics Board to approve 97 sterilizations before it was dissolved. Additionally, a large purpose of Law 116 was to further the science of eugenics and incite economic growth.

Law 116 was the result of an increase of curiosity and political support for the science of eugenics. It was legitimized by the belief that Puerto Rico was a failing economy that consisted of "unfit" people that should be addressed by decreasing the population density through the means of forced sterilizations. Therefore, population control programs became institutionalized as well as federally subsidized. Funds from both the U.S. government and private investors enabled the last eugenics sterilization law passed under United States territorial jurisdiction. It also legalized state-mandated and forced sterilizations, which further exploited Puerto Ricans.

=== Mexican women ===
Immigration of Mexican citizens into the United States caused much controversy in how well they had adjusted to the American life and culture. Because of this, starting in the early 20th century, they were deemed as a significant problem to the community as they were believed to be mentally weak due to their prolonged adjustment to the American culture. The increase of city populations also led to the belief that mental health degraded, as more mental breakdowns seemed prevalent. This discrimination against Mexican and Mexican-Americans led to eugenics laws in which women were targeted and utilized in sterilization procedures.

Starting in the year 1909, women of Mexican descent were used as targets for the eugenics movement to reinforce population control and purity. Women of all ages were victims of the many sterilization acts performed in hospitals, correction facilities, and asylums, but younger women were especially targeted. Pacific Colony (later known as Lanterman Developmental Center), a home designated for the mentally defective in LA, California, took in many young women and classified them as mentally defective and sexually delinquent starting in 1944. According to laws in California justifying sterilization acts, staff at this clinic deemed it was in the best interests of society to go forth with the procedure on some of the women who were sent here.

In Los Angeles, between 1969 and 1973, Mexican and Chicana (Mexican-American) women were also disproportionately targeted by involuntary sterilizations. A number of these women would go on to join a class action lawsuit, Madrigal v. Quilligan, discussed below.

These Mexican and Mexican-American women were given the stereotype as "hyper-fertile" and were believed to lack the knowledge of birth control methods due to the high numbers of teen pregnancies occurring within their community. At the Hospital of LA County+USC, coercive sterilization was justified as it was an attempt to control the birthrate of these women. In 1998 the US government performed a census and multiyear analysis of Latino births and found the women of Mexican origin displayed the highest rate of childbirth compared to other Latina women. From these statistics, the "Save our State" campaign arose and worked to enforce more eugenic sterilization of these women.

In 1973 an investigation by progressive anti-sterilization advocacy groups discovered the stories of Mary Alice's and Minnie Lee Relf's sterilization. This story was released by the Southern Poverty Law Center and led to the discovery of 16 thousand women and 8,000 men being sterilized using federal funds in 1972. In addition to this finding, they found more than three hundred of these patients were under the legal age of 21. Following this discovery and exposure, in 1977 Mexican-American began coming forth to file lawsuits in relation to coercive sterilization they faced while in labor.

In 1979 a bill to repeal the eugenics laws passed that legalized sterilization was proposed to the legislature in California. Many women were coerced into have the tubal ligation procedure done right after postpartum which was paid for using federal money that was dispersed into the War On Poverty first initiated by Lyndon B. Johnson.

Many of these sterilizations were done involuntarily and without consent. Oftentimes, these women signed off on paperwork without being able to read the English language. This sterilization was seen as a result of barriers experienced by Spanish speaking women. Other times, they were told it was necessary in order to maintain their welfare benefits. It became common to sterilize women after giving birth whether by tubal ligation or hysterectomy. Even when the women did consent, it was often under false pretenses that the procedure could be reversed if they decided to have children again in the future.

==== No Más Bebes (2015) ====
The film No Más Bebes tells the stories of several Chicana women sterilized at the Los Angeles County-USC Medical Center in the 1970s. They were part of a larger group of women who underwent sterilization without a proper form of consent. Many women only learned of their sterilization months and perhaps years later. Antonia Hernandez, the plaintiff's attorney in the Madrigal v. Quilligan (1978) lawsuit, is largely responsible for relaying such information, as she spent significant amounts of time patrolling Mexican American barrios searching for Chicana women listed on hospital documents. Hernandez and Charles Nabarette learned of the coerced tubal ligations from Dr. Bernard Rosenfeld, a resident at the teaching hospital. In the documentary, he compares the medical center's practices to the sterilization of Jews in Nazi Germany at the beginning of World War II. Consequently, he was terminated for acting as a whistleblower, and nearly at risk of losing his medical license. The ten women who filed the lawsuit were U.S. citizens with varying proficiencies in the English language. The film reveals many justifications for the tubal ligations performed, including rushed, last-minute decision-making, misunderstanding of medical jargon, language barriers, and written signatures of consent. Dr. Edward James Quilligan, the main defendant on trial, claims that the hospital was simply “practicing good medicine” in one of his interviews for the documentary. He was dismissed from the case early on for playing a managerial role and maintaining no real presence during the performance of tubal ligations. Ultimately, the ten mothers fighting for financial compensation, accountability for medical physicians, and a shift in government policies lost the case. Federal judge Jesse Curtis Jr. ruled in favor of the hospital, concluding that the doctors were not aware of the harm sterilization would have on Mexican-American women. In essence, the judge used the anthropological analysis conducted by Carlos Velez-Ibanez to blame the Chicano subculture for the negative effects of sterilization. However, the case proved significant beyond an unsuccessful lawsuit; in the aftermath of Madrigal v. Quilligan (1978), consent forms were required in both English and Spanish, as well as a description of medical procedure in colloquial terms, and a waiting period of seventy-two hours before sterilization procedures. Translators were also readily available in California's hospitals in following years.

==== Marginality: Abortion and Chicano Rights ====
At a time where both the Chicano Movement and the Abortion rights movement were well underway, many Mexican-American women were pushed to the margins of both historical developments. The Chicana women interviewed in No Más Bebés (2015) briefly touched on experiences of neglect from white feminist developments; while Antonia Hernandez and ten immigrant mothers were fighting for the right to bear children, many white, women activists were advocating for the legal right to immediate sterilization. In other words, white women wanted to establish on-demand sterilizations while Chicana women were advocating against the harmful policy. The absence of a waiting period for (postpartum) sterilizations put non-white women like Maria Hurtado, Consuelo Hermosillo, and Maria Figueroa in direct danger of forceful sterilization. In essence, the racialization of Latina's bodies had profound effects on their inclusion in the Women's Rights Movement of the 1960s and 1970s. This plays a significant role in how the Abortion Rights Movement is remembered in particular; though it is often characterized by inclusive activism, the lived experiences of Mexican-American women prove otherwise.

Several women from the No Más Bebés documentary also expressed the disregard of Mexican-American men within the Chicano Movement. Though none of the women involved in the Madrigal v. Quilligan case directly participated in the Chicano Movement kickstarted by Cesar Chavez's United Farm Workers Movement, their lives were uprooted by postpartum sterilizations. In fact, as revealed by the documentary, many men within the Mexican-American community considered women who received sterilizations as “mujeres de la calle”; wanton street walkers who wanted to sleep with multiple men at the same time. Such a reaction from their male counterparts had harmful effects on immigrant mothers. Maria Figueroa was barred from testifying in the lawsuit by her husband, and even attempted suicide in the aftermath of losing the ability to bear children.

Gendered issues of bodily autonomy and sexual power relations were also a concern amongst Mexican-American women advancing the Chicano Student Movement. A lack of reproductive health counseling on college campuses contributed to the increasing dropout rates amongst Chicana students. Unplanned pregnancies and little to no access to birth control barred Chicana students from completing their undergraduate studies, though they tended to excel academically. There was also a general sense of skepticism amongst Mexican-American families about sending their children to American universities, as children were culturally expected to economically support their loved ones. Young Mexican-American women would also be expected to help raise their siblings—not have kids of their own just yet. Such a phenomenon across college campuses reflected a common double standard; Chicanos could enjoy their sexual freedom while assuming leadership positions in student activist groups while Chicana students were limited to supplemental roles in the movement and obligated to bear the brunt of an unplanned pregnancy.

== Sterilization by state ==
=== California ===
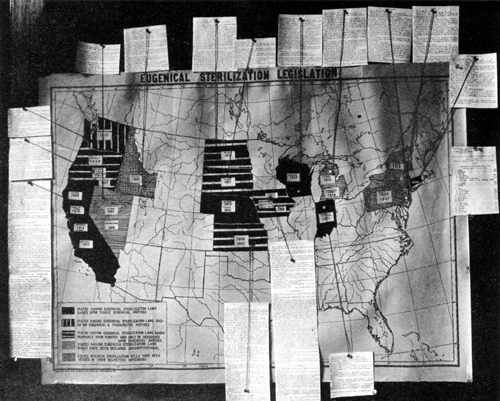
Sterilization States

Involuntary sterilization programs were in some instances supported and funded by the states. In California, the rationale for forced sterilization was primarily for eugenics purposes, although this later shifted to a fear of overpopulation and welfare dependency.

California passed the third law in the United States that allowed state institutions to sterilize "unfit" and "feeble-minded" individuals. As eugenics gained credibility as a field in science, sterilization rates increased, especially after the 1927 Buck v. Bell U.S. Supreme Court decision, which upheld the constitutionality of sterilization laws in Virginia. See below. According to available data, California performed one third of all reported sterilization procedures in the United States between 1910 and 1960.

Although the Californian state was the third state to legalize sterilization as mentioned previously, it has made the greatest impact by performing over half of the sterilization procedures throughout the eugenics era from 1907 to 1979. Their laws granted prison authorities and asylum medical superintendents the right to sterilize a patient if it would be proven to better their conditions. It surpassed the other 32 states who had passed eugenics laws due to its large Latino incarceration rates and advocacy found within the eugenics movements. Between 1920 and 1945, over 17,000 individuals were recommended for sterilization in California. During this time, Latinas were at a 59% greater risk of being sterilized than non-Latinas. Eugenic philosophy claimed scientific legitimacy to uphold racial stereotypes of latino/as, deeming them as unfit and even "hyper-fertile, inadequate mothers, criminally inclined, and more prone to feeblemindedness." At a time of segregation and growing anti-Mexican immigration sentiment, eugenic programs have been linked to efforts to reduce immigration. The laws in California from 1909 to 1979 allowed for nonconsensual sterilization of over 20,000 individuals.

The forced sterilizations in California began in 1909 when a eugenics law was passed. It allowed doctors to sterilize people who were thought to be "unfit" to have children at state hospitals. Before this law was nullified in 1979, more than 20,000 people, including teenagers were victims of this sterilization. Doctors recommended people who they thought should be sterilized for certain reasons; this included not only people with a medical condition but also perfectly healthy ones as well. Minors as young as thirteen years old were sterilized. This law was meant to keep the "undesirable population" from growing. Women of Latina Origin were 59% more likely to be sterilized than women who were not of latino descent.

An example of California's eugenic and neo-eugenic practices is a case from 1966. Nancy Hernandez was a 21-year-old mother of two in Santa Barbara, California. Nancy pleaded guilty, in 1966, for being with her boyfriend, Joseph Sanchez, while he used illegal narcotics. The judge that presided over the trial, Judge Kearney, requested that if she wanted to get probation then she must submit to sterilization. The judge's reason behind his decision was that if she acts immorally then she should not be allowed to have more children. Hernandez inevitably did not submit to forced sterilization and instead was sentenced to three months in jail. Following the trial Nancy's lawyer submitted a writ of habeas corpus and requested that Hernandez be released from the Court's Order. Hernandez's lawyer stated that Judge Kearney was using Hernandez to make the public consider what is moral or immoral and his decision was based on neo-eugenic principles and assumed that because Hernandez was a minority and in the presence of marijuana that she naturally would descend to non-moral conduct and should not have children. Kearney's main goal all along was to reduce the state's welfare expenditures through forced sterilization. Many citizens across America, when this case went National, felt that her drug related misdemeanor had nothing to do with her parenting skills and style. It seemed that many people in America agreed that there should be a punishment for her crimes, but that forced sterilization was never a fit punishment.

Some other instances in California's sterilization practices in the 1960s and 1970s was shown in the movie, No mas bebes, multiple women and families discuss the impact of sterilization abuse on their mental health, their relationship, and their family planning. Many women reported that at the L.A. County hospital, throughout the 1960s and 1970s, that they were forced to submit to sterilization. Many of these women did not know that they had been sterilized until they found out through 26-year-old Chicana Lawyer and a whistle blowing doctor. These mothers mounted a civil rights lawsuit during the same time of Roe v. Wade and other reproductive rights justice movements. These stories made many Chicanas and other women across the nation question their government and reproductive rights.

==== Los Angeles ====
In Los Angeles, hundreds of Mexican women were sterilized after giving birth at Los Angeles County Hospital. In the documentary No Mas Bebes, some of the women who were sterilized at this hospital shared their experiences. All of the women shown did not want to be sterilized. "In California, at least into the 1950s, compulsory sterilization was consistently described as a public health strategy that could breed out undesirable defects from the populace and fortify the state as a whole". Women who were unhappy with this situation marched and protested to speak up for their reproductive rights.

===== Guadalupe Acosta =====
In 1973, Acosta was living in Los Angeles. She was a poor Mexican woman. She gave birth to a child with brain damage so he did not survive. The doctor sterilized her stating that her husband had given permission for a tubal ligation. The husband denied giving such consent. In an interview done by Claudia Dreifus Guadalupe stated "My nerves and my head are in great pain. Ever since the operation, I am very inattentive. Not forgetful, inattentive. People sometimes have to tell me things twice. I am not there". Guadalupe later gave more details about her experience at the hospital, her physician worked in an aggressive manner to induce her labor. She said that he pushed down her abdomen with great force and even hit her in the stomach due to her swinging arms. Acosta died in 2003. She had a baby in Mexico but it was taken away from her because he was born out of wedlock. The baby that she delivered at Los Angeles Hospital was her fourth baby. Her husband left her and her two kids due to her tubal ligation.

===== Jovita Rivera =====
Jovita Rivera was one of the ten plaintiffs in the federal class action suit of Madrigal v. Quilligan. On October 12, 1973, Rivera went to the USC-LA hospital to give birth to her second child. She was under medication and in labor pains when medical staff misinformed her about the risk and chances of getting pregnant right after birth. She consented and a tubal ligation was done. Rivera, 27 at the time, states that during her stay at the hospital, while in advanced labor and under pain medication due to complications, her doctor told her she would be a burden to the government. Women like Rivera were offered the choice of sterilization under poor circumstances, under medication, and with no language assistance for translation. Some of the other plaintiffs for this case faced hostility from staff when told they could receive more pain medication if they signed papers consenting to sterilization.

Rivera stated: "... the doctor told me that I had too many children, that I was poor, and a burden to the government and I should sign a paper not to have more children [...] The doctors told me that my tubes could be untied at a later time and I could still have children." While Rivera was under distress, she believed the process was reversible and consented. When Rivera and the other plaintiffs testified in court to prove that they had been coerced into getting a procedure, the judge did not rule in their favor.

=== Texas ===
Low-income minority women were more dependent on sterilization than other groups. In a study conducted in El Paso, Texas, groups of women were asked why they would choose sterilization; many of the top reasons included: not wanting any more children, their current age and health, plans of working or attending school or inability to afford another child.

=== Indiana ===
Indiana passed the first sterilization law in the United States, the 1907 Indiana Eugenics Law. It was proposed as a part of the Progressive-era wave in which public health advocacy began coming to light.

=== Georgia ===
As recent as September 2020, whistleblower complaints were filed concerning "the rate at which hysterectomies are performed on immigrant women under ICE (U.S. Immigration and Customs Enforcement) custody at ICDC". The whistleblower complaint also includes reports from many detained women who described "not understanding why they had received a hysterectomy" and even details "miscommunications" that led to patients receiving hysterectomies they may not have needed.

== Sterilization of Women Living With HIV in Latin America ==
Forced and coerced sterilization of Latina women is not limited to the United States; it is an internationally recognized human rights violation. In Latin America, women living with HIV have reported being pressured or coerced into sterilization by healthcare providers.

A 2015 study by Kendall and Albert conducted qualitative analysis of reports of how and when healthcare providers pressured women living with HIV in Latin America to be sterilized. They also assessed whether social, economic or fertility history characteristics were associated with the pressure to sterilize. Researchers found that approximately 23% of the women living with HIV reported experiencing pressure to undergo sterilization after their diagnosis. Those who were pregnant while both themselves and their healthcare providers were aware of their HIV status were nearly six times more likely to face coerced or forced sterilization compared to those who were not pregnant with a known diagnosis. Participants reported that some healthcare providers suggested an HIV diagnosis limited their ability to make decisions about having children or choosing contraception. In some cases, physicians were reported to have provided misleading information about related pregnancy risks or withheld services intended to prevent mother-to-child HIV transmission in order to pressure women into sterilization. Reports also indicated that forced sterilizations sometimes occurred during caesarean deliveries.

The experiences reported by women living with HIV suggest that stigma and discrimination within healthcare settings plays a large role in coercive and forced sterilization. These women are particularly vulnerable when accessing maternal health services.

== Related court cases ==
=== Buck v. Bell (1927) ===
Carrie Buck was raped by a nephew of her adopted parents in Virginia at the age of 17. In an attempt to cover up the assault, her family committed her to the Lynchburg State Colony for Epileptics and Feebleminded. Soon later, the colony realized that Buck was pregnant with her assailant's child. At the colony, Dr. Albert Sidney Priddy examined Buck and deemed her to be unfit due to her feeblemindedness. Priddy recommended her for sterilization. This was brought to the courts in order to sanctify the sterilization order. Buck's biological mother was labeled as feebleminded, so Buck was used as "proof" that feeblemindedness was hereditary and sterilization was necessary for the common good. The Supreme Court voted 8-1 stating that being feebleminded led to promiscuity and sterilization was justified. Buck was then sterilized under the Virginia 1924 compulsory sterilization statue.

The Supreme Court case of Buck v. Bell confirmed the constitutionality of sterilization of the feebleminded and "unfit". This case solidified that involuntary sterilization was not cruel or unusual punishment and it did not violate due process, but rather it helped the good of the country as a whole. Individual rights of reproduction were now able to be taken for the public good. Cases of involuntary sterilization rose significantly after this case in 1927.

=== Madrigal v. Quilligan (1978) ===
In the 1970s, a group of Chicana women brought up a federal class action lawsuit against a hospital in Los Angeles County regarding their sterilizations. Women in the class were allegedly given false information regarding sterilization. The titular plaintiff, Dolores Madrigal, a Latina woman, was allegedly told several times by a medical professional that sterilization could be reversed. Other women involved in the case signed consent forms for their sterilizations because they were allegedly sedated or manipulated by doctors and medical staff. A common reason for forcing the sterilizations of these women was apparently the burden that their future children would be to "taxpayers". Many of the women did not discover that they had been sterilized until they visited a doctor.

The judge deciding Madrigal held that it was a part of a doctor's practice to provide sterilizations to these women based upon their cultural backgrounds. The judge, Judge Curtis, stated in his ruling that miscommunication between the doctors and the women, rather than malice, resulted in the sterilizations. In the words of his final comment, the judge stated, "One can sympathize with them for their inability to communicate clearly, but one can hardly blame the doctors for relying on these indicia of consent which appeared to be unequivocal on their face and which are in constant use in the medical center."

== Further implications ==
In 1979, the practice was abolished in California. It is estimated that approximately 20,000 women were sterilized in total.

The 2021–22 state budget package included funding $7.5 million for the California Forced or Involuntary Sterilization Compensation Program legislation, to begin Jan. 1, 2022, administered by the California Victim Compensation Board (CalVCB), for survivors of state-sponsored sterilization 1909 through 1979 and survivors of involuntary sterilizations in women's prisons after 1979 to ask about and apply for compensation (www.victims.ca.gov/fiscp or reach out to CalVCB at 800-777-9229 or fiscp@victims.ca.gov). Researchers estimated hundreds of Californians are alive who might hypothetically qualify before the December 2023 deadline, but reportedly as of early September 2023, only 101 applications had been approved, with seven cases closed as incomplete, and 339 denied.

== See also ==
- Madrigal v. Quilligan
- No más bebés
- Sterilization law in the United States
- Eugenics in the United States
- Sterilization of Native American women
- Compulsory sterilization
- Anti-Mexican sentiment
- Chicano Movement
- Abortion rights movements
- East L.A. Walkouts
- Women's Rights
