= Richard P. Usatine =

American physician

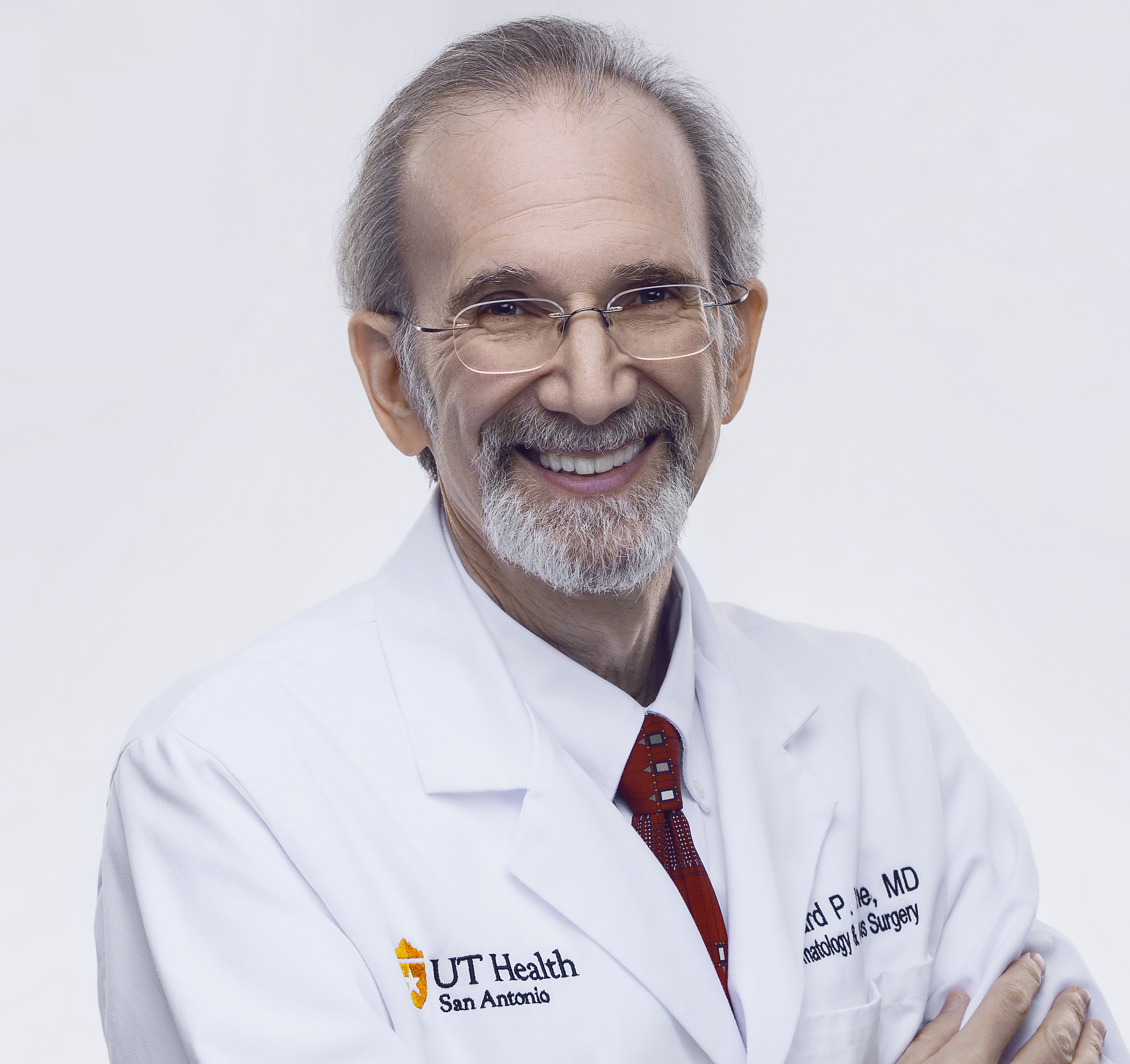
Richard P. Usatine, MD

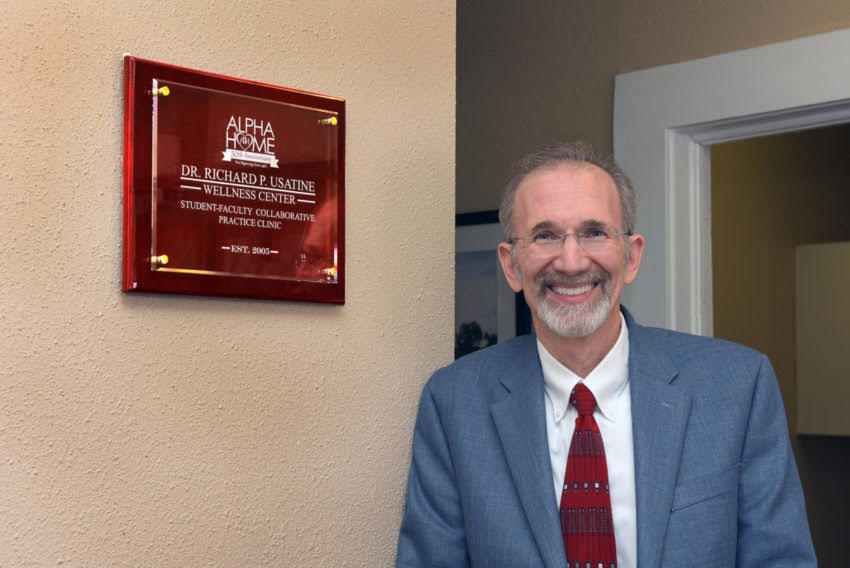
Dr. Richard P. Usatine Wellness Center

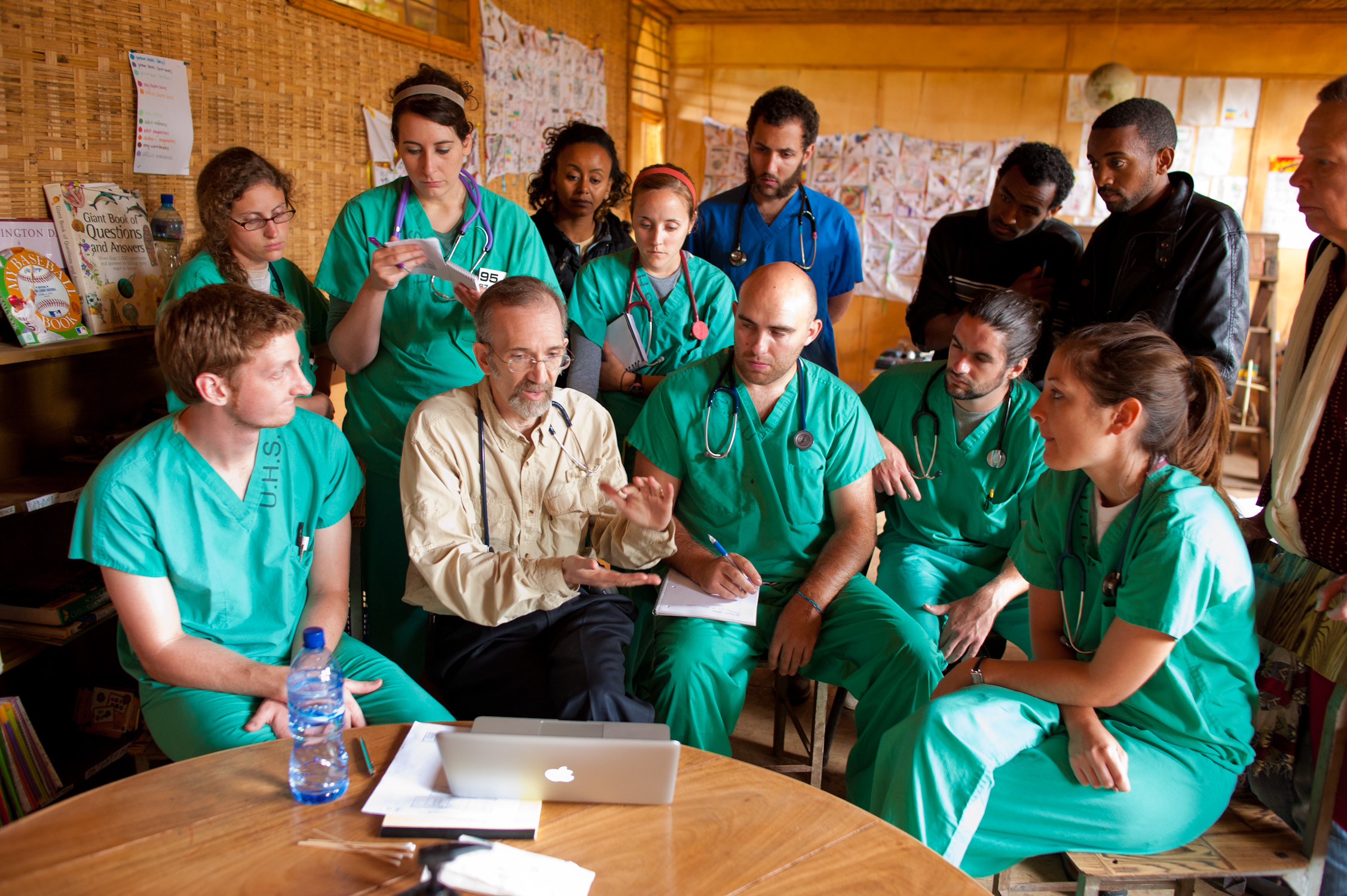
Dr. Usatine teaching his medical students

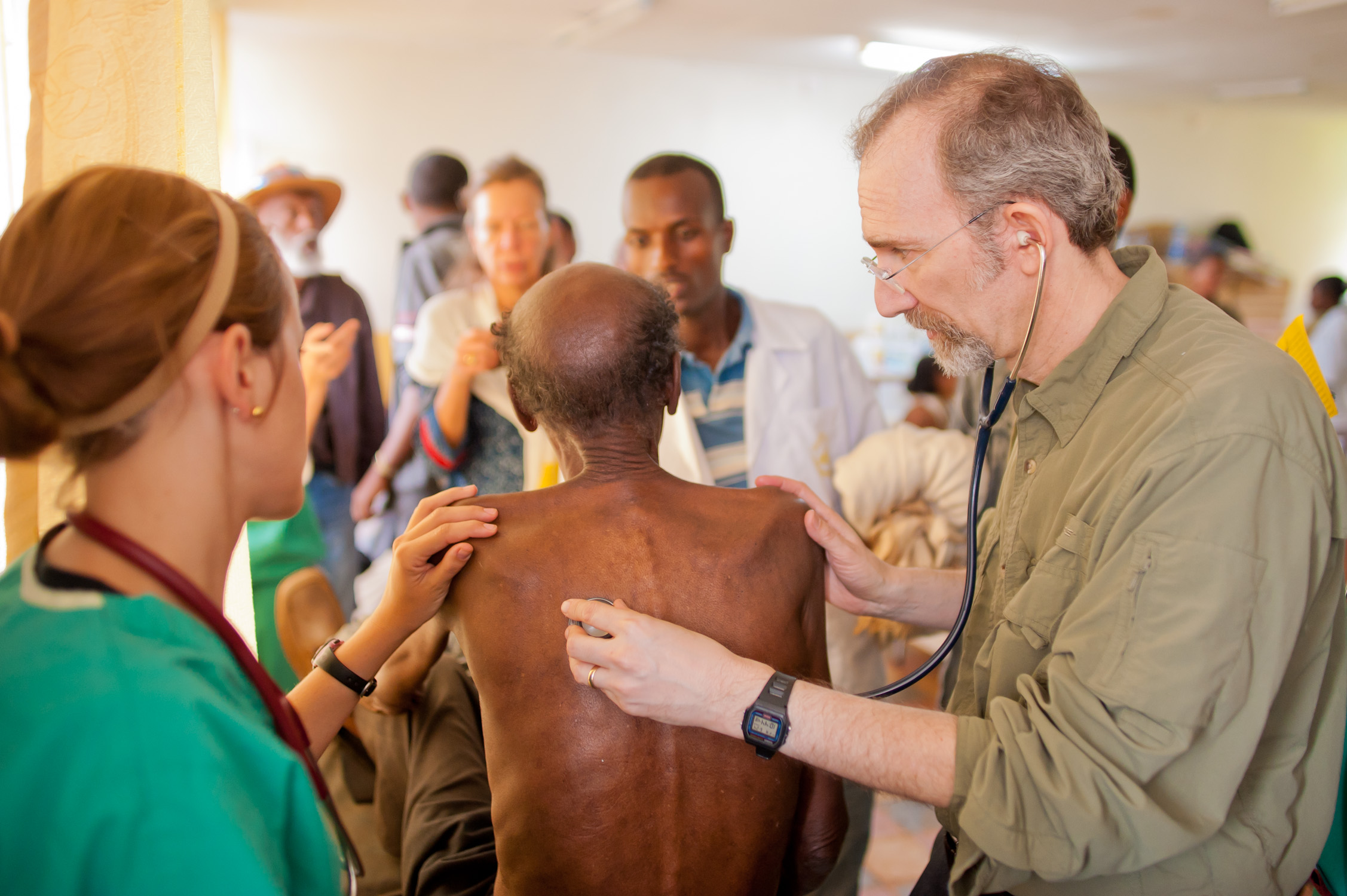
Dr. Usatine treating a patient in Ethiopia

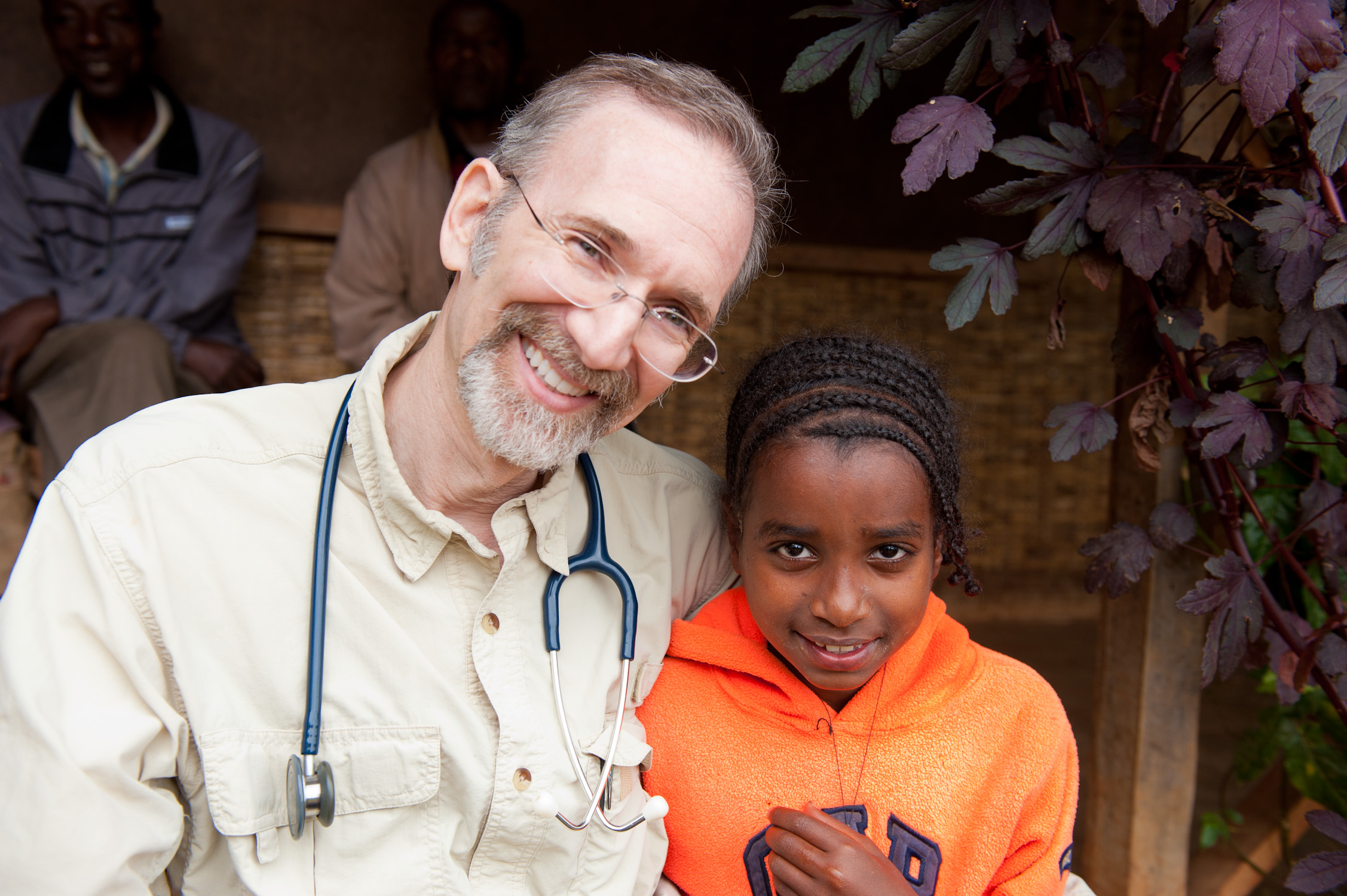
Dr. Usatine visiting Ethiopia

Richard Philip Usatine is a physician, photographer, writer, speaker, and professor of family and community medicine, dermatology and cutaneous surgery. He is Assistant Director of Medical Humanities Education at the University of Texas Health Science Center at San Antonio.

His work in medical photography is represented in nine out of ten of his published books and numerous other medical books.

Usatine received his MD from Columbia University and went on to complete his residency in family medicine at the UCLA Medical Center.

== Biography ==
Usatine was born on October 12, 1956, in Brooklyn, New York. He grew up in Nanuet, NY, where he graduated from high school in 1974. He attended Williams College and graduated summa cum laude in chemistry in 1978. He met his wife while attending school at Colombia. They moved to Los Angeles in 1982 so Usatine could train in family medicine at UCLA. Their two children were born in Los Angeles, California.

Usatine served as the medical director of four free clinics for people experiencing homelessness in Los Angeles. His first medical job during his residency was with Planned Parenthood in Los Angeles.

Dr. Usatine co-founded the medical student-run clinic at Alpha Home in San Antonio, Texas, that opened in January 2005. By 2018, the first student-run free clinic had grown to six clinics under the umbrella of the Center for Medical Humanities and Ethics. Dr. Usatine continues as medical director of the whole program, with individual directors for each of the six clinics.

Usatine created a Humanism in Medicine Fellowship for medical students that work during their senior year at the six Student Faculty Collaborative Practices. In addition, he directs a course on "Homelessness and Addiction" in the medical school.

Usatine is the founding director of the University Health System Skin Clinic in San Antonio. He is a board-certified family physician in dermatology. He is the national chair of the yearly Skin Course put on by the American Academy of Family Physicians. Usatine has served on the board of trustees since 2009 of his county's mental health provider (Center for Health Care Services).

== Publications ==
Usatine is the co-author of over 130 articles and 10 books; some of them include:

- The Color Atlas and Synopsis of Family Medicine, 3rd Edition (2018)
- Color Atlas of Internal Medicine (2015)
- Cutaneous Cryosurgery 4/E (2014)
- Color Atlas of Pediatrics (2014)
- Color Atlas of Family Medicine 2/E (2013)
- Dermatologic and Cosmetic Procedures in Office Practice (2011)
- The Color Atlas of Family Medicine (2008)
- Practical Allergy (2003)
- Yoga RX: A Step-by-Step Program to Promote Health, Wellness, and Healing for Common Ailments (2002)
- Skin Surgery: A Practical Guide (1998)

== Electronic publishing and editorial work ==
Usatine is the co-founder and co-president of Usatine Media, which has been developing medical mobile apps for iOS and Android since 2010. Usatine is the associate editor of Photo Rounds and Photo Round Friday and is the founder of the Interactive Dermatology Atlas on the web.

VisualDx, in their blog website, states that,

Twenty-five thousand of the best medical images representing a more diverse range of skin colors are joining VisualDx's image library, thanks to the award-winning physician who took them. Dr. Richard Usatine, a family physician and professor of dermatology at the University of Texas Health San Antonio, has joined the VisualDx editorial board and is sharing thousands of the clinical images he has taken throughout his long career.

== Honors and awards (select) ==
- AAMC Humanism in Medicine Award – this Association of American Medical Colleges award recognizes one medical school faculty physician in the nation who "exemplifies the qualities of a caring and compassionate mentor in the teaching and advising of medical students" – 2000 National Award (second year this national award was given)
- In 2000, Usatine was recognized as the national recipient of the Humanism in Medicine Award, by the Association of American Medical Colleges.
- 2016 Alpha Home has named its Wellness Center as the new Dr. Richard P. Usatine Wellness Center. November 11, 2016
- Since 2000, he has been chosen yearly by his peers to be included in The Best Doctors in America.
- 2016 Keynote speaker at the national Society of Student-run Free Clinics annual conference in Phoenix, Arizona January 30, 2016. Honored as a founding faculty advisor to the organization. Over 520 students and faculty mentors were in attendance. Title: Giving Back to Your Community through Student-run Free Clinics.
- 2013 Lone Star Award from the Association of Substance Abuse Programs in Texas. This award honors individuals, makers, corporations and foundations for their outstanding leadership and distinctive contributions to substance use disorder prevention, treatment and recovery services. Nominated by the President of Alpha Home.
- Distinguished Teaching Professor, University of Texas Board of Regents, University of Texas Health Sciences Center, San Antonio, 2010
- Innovative Program Award, Society of Teachers of Family Medicine, awarded to the 4 people that developed the Family Medicine Digital Resources Library, May 2009
- Sharing the Vision – Presented in "Grateful Appreciation for Your Dedication and Support of Student Run Clinics and Those Who Care for the Underserved." Presented on March 28, 2009, University of Nebraska Medical Center.
- Best Doctors – selected by his peers to be included in The Best Doctors in America
- Honored at the Alpha Home 42nd Anniversary Celebration for providing compassionate care to the women recovering from substance abuse at the Alpha Home UTHSCSA Student-Run Clinic, 2008
- Volunteer of the Year Award, United Way of San Antonio and Bexar County, Individual in Service to an Agency, June 2008. Nominated by Alpha Home CEO, Julie Wisdom-Wild
- In 2008, Usatine won the Volunteer of the Year Award from the United Way of San Antonio and Bexar County in the category of Individual in Service to an Agency
- Presidential Recognition Award, Society of Teachers of Family Medicine, for being a founding editor of the Teaching Physician, May 2008
- Presidential Teaching Excellence Award, University of Texas Health Sciences Center, San Antonio (UTHSCSA), 2007
- Honored at the Alpha Home 40th Anniversary Celebration for co-founding the UTHSCSA Student-Run Clinic for women recovering from substance abuse at the Alpha Home, 2006
- Health Care Hero (for the work of the student-run clinics) – San Antonio Business Journal, April 2006. Nominated by SAMMinistries.
- Voted Honorary Faculty Member of the Gold Humanism Honor Society, UTHSCSA School of Medicine, April 2005
- UCLA Academic Senate Distinguished Teaching Award – 2000
- Town and Country Magazine "Outstanding Primary-Care Physicians in the U.S." – 2000
- California Medical Association Statewide Award – in recognition of commitment to tobacco education and prevention and for anti-smoking advocacy efforts – award presented by the California Medical Association Foundation's Community/ Physician Activists Countering Tobacco (ComPACT), 1999
- University Muslim Medical Association Free Clinic Award from UMMA Community Clinic, in recognition of efforts to support the students and residents that developed this new community clinic in South-Central LA, 1997
- Award for Excellence in Medical Education, UCLA School of Medicine, 1996
- Salvation Army Award – for "outstanding services rendered to the West Los Angeles Transitional Village, July 1995, from The Salvation Army
- Health Education "Most Community Conscious Television Show" for "To Your Health" on WCTV 1988

== See also ==
- Electrosurgery
- VisualDx
