= Thelma Howard =

Housekeeper to Walt Disney

Thelma Pearl Howard (June 25, 1913 - June 12, 1993) was the housekeeper and cook to Walt Disney and his family in their Holmby Hills home for thirty years, 1951–1981. She grew up in Idaho, trained as a stenographer in Spokane, Washington, then moved to California in 1931. There she worked in office jobs and as a house cleaner.

As his housekeeper and cook, Howard reportedly gained Disney's respect and friendship and "was accepted fully as a part of the Disney family." Disney gave her shares in his movie studio as Christmas and birthday presents, which she never sold. Her estate was over $9 million, which was divided equally between her son and the Thelma Pearl Howard Foundation. The foundation supports educational programs in the arts, such as dance, music, visual arts and dramatic arts, for children in preschool through eighth grade in Los Angeles County. It is run by the California Community Foundation.
