= Los Angeles General Medical Center =

- Los Angeles County Department of Health Services

Geography
- Location: 2051 Marengo Street; Boyle Heights, Los Angeles, Los Angeles County, California, United States
- Coordinates: 34.0579°N 118.2089°W

Organization
- Care system: Public
- Type: Teaching
- Affiliated university: Keck School of Medicine of USC; United States Navy

Services
- Emergency department: Level I Adult Trauma Center / Level II Pediatric Trauma Center
- Beds: 600

History
- Founded: 1878; 148 years ago

Links
- Website: dhs.lacounty.gov/lageneral
- Lists: Hospitals in California

Los Angeles General Medical Center (also known as LA General and formerly known as Los Angeles County+USC Medical Center, County/USC, County General or by the abbreviation LAC+USC) is a 600-bed public teaching hospital located at 2051 Marengo Street in the Boyle Heights neighborhood of Los Angeles, California, and one of the largest academic medical centers in the United States. The hospital facility is owned by Los Angeles County and operated by the Los Angeles County Department of Health Services. Doctors are faculty of the Keck School of Medicine of USC, who oversee more than 1,000 medical residents being trained by the faculty. Additionally, the United States Navy sends doctors, nurses and corpsmen to train at the hospital, working alongside staff in the trauma center.

The facility is one of three adult Level I trauma centers (providing the highest level of surgical care to trauma patients) operated by Los Angeles County; the others are Ronald Reagan UCLA Medical Center and Harbor–UCLA Medical Center.

The hospital was renamed in 2023 to a name resembling its original name, due to confusion with the privately operated Keck Hospital of USC located a half mile away.

== Operations ==
Los Angeles General Medical Center is one of the largest public hospitals and medical training centers in the United States, and the largest single provider of healthcare in Los Angeles County. It provides healthcare services for the region's medically underserved, is a Level I trauma center and treats over 28 percent of the region's trauma victims (2005). It provides care for half of all sickle-cell anemia patients and those people living with AIDS in Southern California. Los Angeles General Medical Center provides a full spectrum of emergency, inpatient and outpatient services to all including indigent and Medi-Cal only recipients. These include medical, surgical, emergency/trauma, obstetrical, gynecological and pediatric services as well as psychiatric services for adults, adolescents and children.

Los Angeles General Medical Center is one of the busiest public hospitals in the Western United States, with nearly 39,000 inpatients discharged, and one million ambulatory care patient visits each year. The Emergency Department is one of the world's busiest, with more than 150,000 visits per year. LA General operates one of only three burn centers in Los Angeles County and one of the few Level III Neonatal Intensive Care Units in Southern California. LA General is also the home of the Los Angeles County College of Nursing and Allied Health, which has prepared registered nurses for professional practice since its founding in 1895.

Los Angeles General Medical Center also serves as the host facility for the Navy Trauma Training Center, allowing uniformed medical professionals valuable exposure to trauma cases during 30 day clinical rotations that prepare them to treat battlefield injury on the front lines with the United States Marine Corps, at sea with the United States Navy, or ashore at Fleet Hospitals and Shock Trauma Platoons.

In 2013, the American Cancer Society awarded Los Angeles General Medical Center with the Harold P. Freeman Award in recognition of the hospital's achievements to reduce cancer disparities among medically underserved populations.

== New facility ==
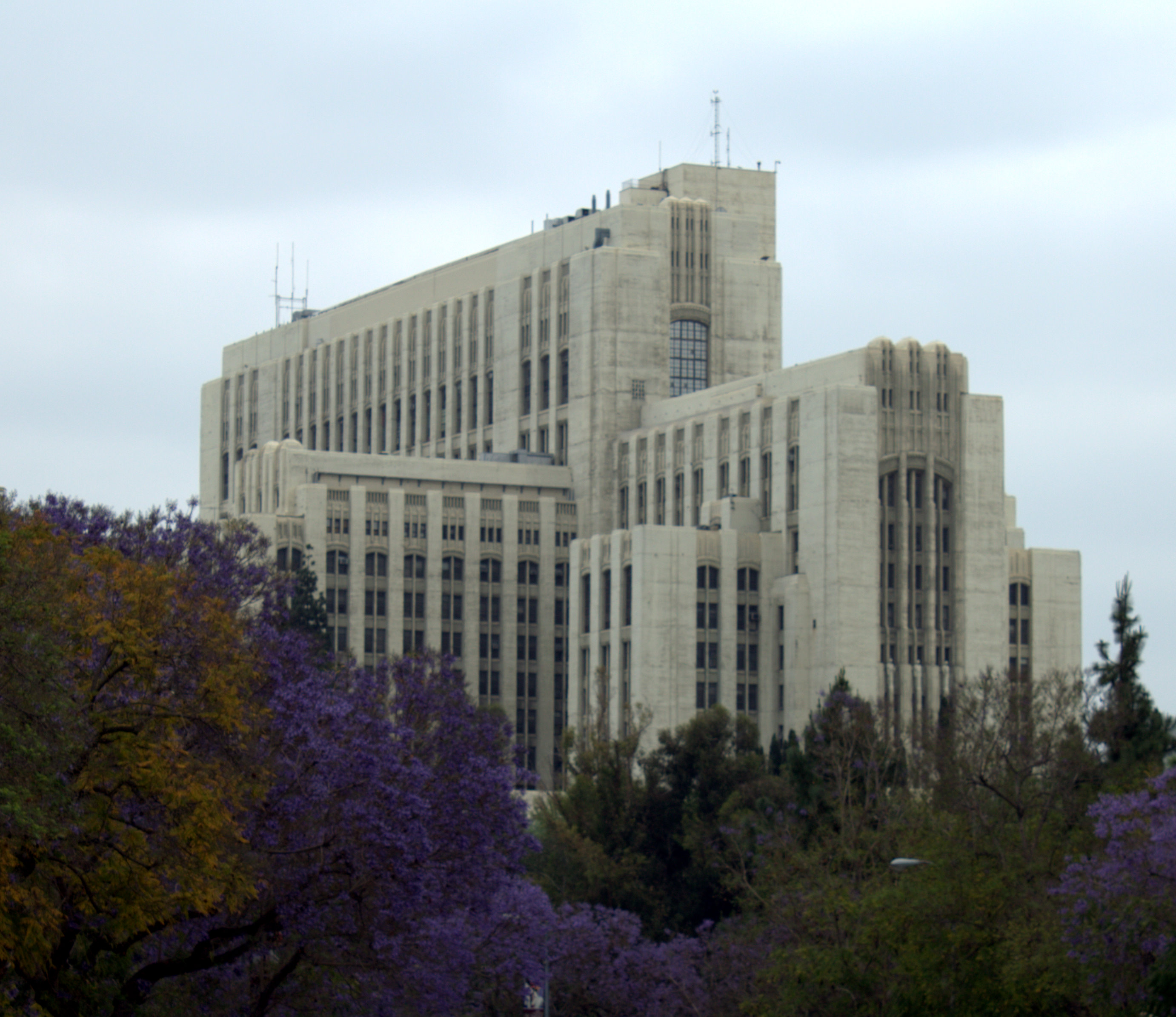
The old hospital, opened in 1933

The original hospital, located at 1200 North State Street, opened in 1933. Designed by the coalition of architects Allied Architects Association, its Art-Deco construction earned it the nickname the "Great Stone Mother" and had 3,000 patient beds. The 1994 Northridge earthquake on January 17, 1994, renewed concerns about building safety codes, and specifically those for hospitals. The California Hospital Seismic Safety Law was signed into law on September 21, 1994. The new law took the 1200 State Street building out of compliance of earthquake and fire safety codes.

To address the problem, a new modern facility was proposed and constructed nearby, at 2051 Marengo Street. Designed by a joint venture of HOK and LBL Associated Architects, the new $1 billion hospital consists of three linked buildings: a clinic tower, a diagnostic and treatment tower, and an inpatient tower, in total supporting 600 patient beds. The new facility has a larger number of intensive care beds to handle patients in the aftermath of disasters.

The new facility was ready by 2010, and on July 23 of that year, the new hospital was opened. Transfer of all inpatients from Women's and Children's Hospital and the 1200 State Street building made the retirement of the original hospital complex official.

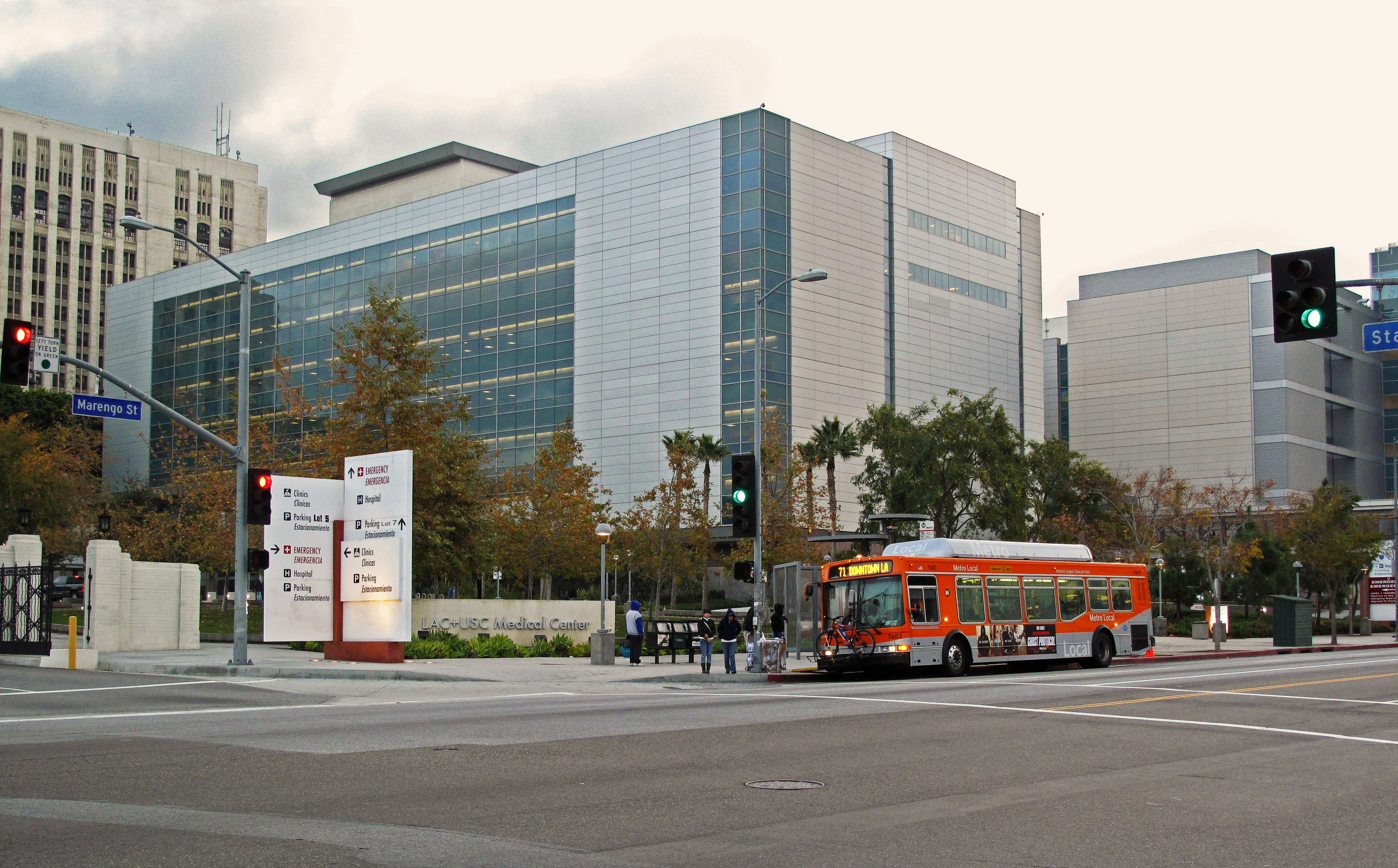
The outpatient clinic of the new hospital, opened July 23, 2010.

The old building at 1200 State Street still stands. The Wellness Center, on the first floor of the old building, was opened in 2014. It is open to the public and includes offices for nonprofit organizations, community outreach and classes for wellness activities, a dance studio, a small YMCA on State Street, and extensive new landscaping. While this building no longer meets the California Hospital Seismic Safety Law, it does meet current seismic standards for non-hospital use.

In 2020, the original pediatrics and obstetrics ward was torn down in order to be replaced by affordable housing.

== History ==
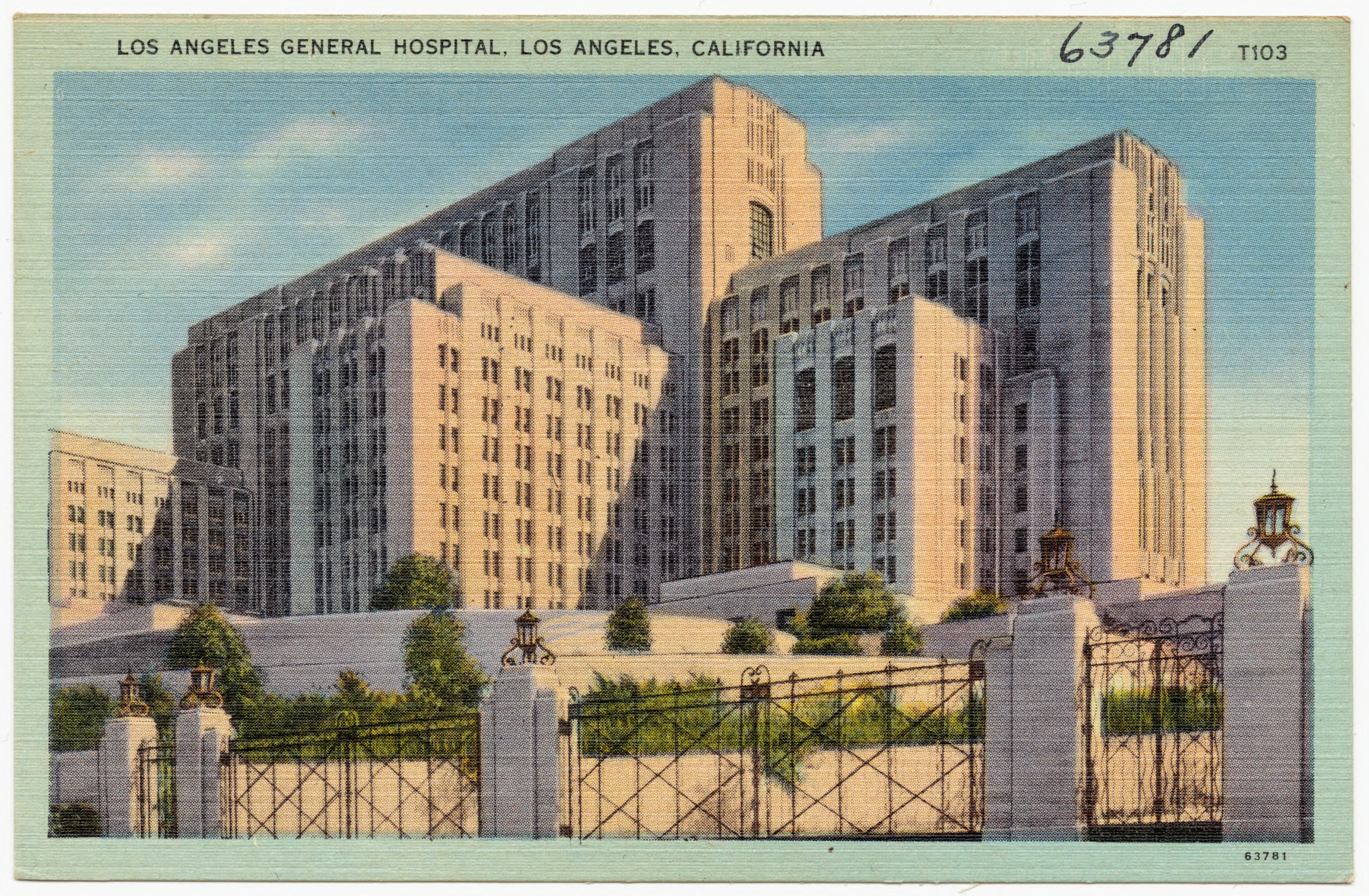
The 1933 building depicted on a postcard

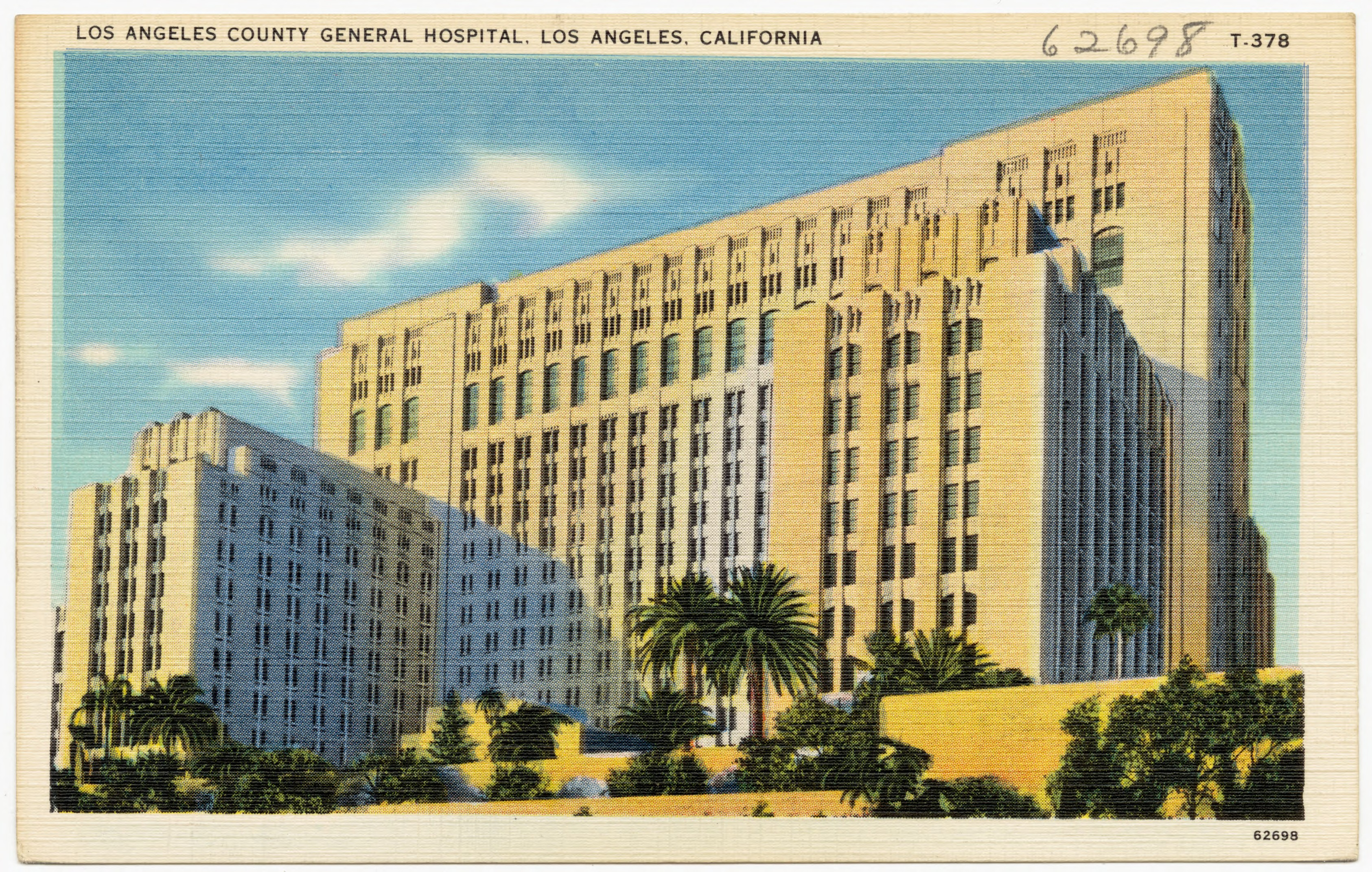
A different angle of the building

The origins of Los Angeles's public hospital system date to the late 19th century, when Los Angeles County opened a 100-bed facility in 1878 on Mission Road to care for the city's indigent population. That early county hospital — serving dozens of patients with a very small staff and budget — provided the institutional base for what would become the county's principal public hospital. Just five years after the University of Southern California was founded, USC's nascent medical school and the County hospital established a formal affiliation in 1885. From that point the County hospital served both as a safety-net provider for the city's poorest residents and as the principal clinical training site for USC medical students and residents; that teaching relationship is continuous across more than a century of clinical education.

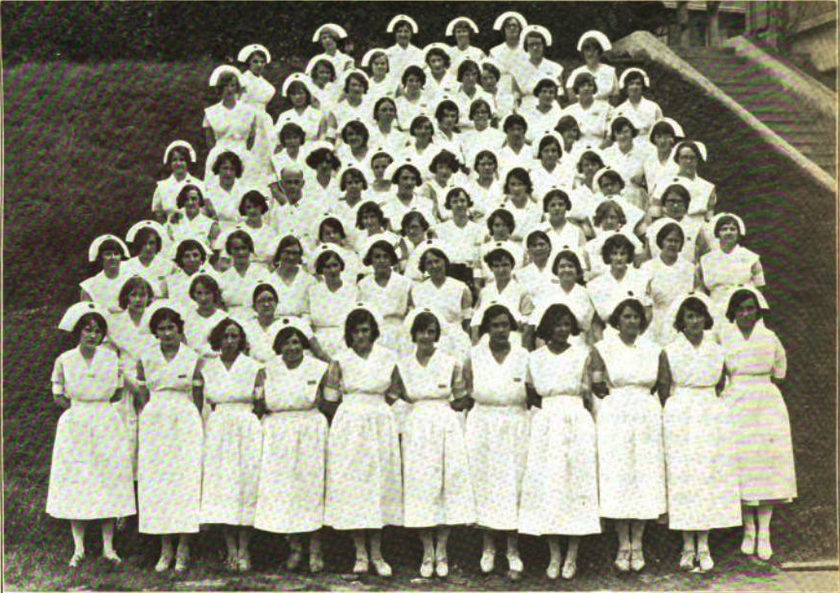
1928 graduating class of the Los Angeles County General Hospital, School of Nursing

Through the early 20th century the County hospital expanded as Los Angeles itself grew. By the 1920s–1930s the hospital moved into a monumental Art-Deco complex at 1200 North State Street — a multi-block H-shaped structure designed by a coalition known as the Allied Architects Association. That building, completed in the early 1930s and long known locally as the “Great Stone Mother,” seated thousands of patients and became an architectural and civic landmark in East Los Angeles.

The hospital's dual identity — county-run public hospital and USC clinical teaching campus — shaped public health in Los Angeles. Scholarly reviews of the hospital's century-plus of service document its central role in disaster response, infectious-disease care, and training large numbers of physicians and nurses for the region; historians note recurring tensions and collaborations between county administration and university medicine as both institutions adapted across eras (public-health reform, the Great Depression, post-war expansion, and the rise of modern medical subspecialties).

The 1994 Northridge earthquake prompted statewide seismic-safety legislation for hospitals (SB 1953) and accelerated plans to replace or retrofit older hospital structures. Because the 1930s State Street building could not be economically brought into full compliance as an active acute-care hospital, Los Angeles County and design/construction partners built a modern replacement campus on Marengo Street. The replacement facility — designed by a joint venture led by HOK and LBL and constructed by major contractors — opened in phases in 2008–2010. The new campus was planned both to meet contemporary clinical standards and to function as a disaster-resilient Level I trauma and teaching hospital.

Today's LA General Medical Center (formerly the LAC+USC Medical Center) sits adjacent to the University of Southern California Health Sciences Campus. That campus clusters USC's Keck School of Medicine (the region's first medical school, founded in 1885), the USC School of Pharmacy, Keck Hospital of USC and other specialty centers such as the USC Norris Comprehensive Cancer Center. Over the decades the proximity of the county hospital and USC's health-science schools has created an integrated environment for clinical care, education, and biomedical research: County patients supply a broad, diverse clinical caseload for USC trainees, while USC faculty provide much of the attending-physician staff for residency programs and specialized services.

In the 21st century the institutions continue to evolve: the older Art-Deco hospital structure has been the subject of restoration and adaptive-reuse planning (including “Healthy Village” and affordable-housing proposals) while the modern Marengo campus concentrates acute care, trauma, and large residency programs. In 2023 the county and hospital branding was updated to “Los Angeles General Medical Center” (LA General), reflecting both the hospital's long history and its distinct identity within a dense institutional neighborhood of USC-affiliated hospitals and schools.

=== Forced sterilizations ===
From the late 1960s through the 1970s, LACMC physicians forcibly sterilized Hispanic patients through deception and coercion. The victims were pregnant women and mothers who could not speak English. Physicians presented English-language consent forms while the victims were in labor. Under the sedative effects of physician-prescribed Valium, the patients were told they could die if they were not sterilized. LACMC physicians similarly claimed the procedure was reversible, which was not true. Some victims refused to sign the consent forms and were sterilized regardless, while others were not informed about their sterilization.

==== Madrigal v. Quilligan ====
Dr. Bernard Rosenfeld, a physician at LACMC, compiled evidence of the forced sterilizations and became a whistleblower against the hospital's misconduct. Dr. Rosenfeld solicited legal assistance from Antonia Hernández and Charles Navarrete, leading to the 1978 class action lawsuit Madrigal v. Quilligan. In Madrigal v. Quilligan, ten LACMC patients, known as the 'Madrigal Ten,' alleged hospital staff unlawfully coerced their sterilization through force and deception.

The plaintiffs sued LACMC's director of obstetrics and gynaecology, Dr. Edward James Quilligan, accusing Quilligan of a systemic effort to prevent Hispanic births. Justifying the practice, Dr. Quilligan was quoted during trial as stating "poor minority women in L.A. County were having too many babies; that it was a strain on society; and that it was good that they be sterilized." Witnesses also testified Dr. Quilligan boasted the practice would ensure that "we can cut the birth rate of the Negro and Mexican populations in Los Angeles County."

The Madrigal Ten lost in district court and subsequently appealed with support from the Mexican American Legal Defense and Educational Fund. On appeal, a federal judge placed an injunction prohibiting LACMC and Quilligan from sterilizing patients younger than 21 years old.

===== Legacy =====
Madrigal v. Quilligan inspired the Emmy-nominated 2015 film No más bebés, recounting the abuse of the Madrigal Ten by physicians at LACMC.

== Transportation ==
The LA General Medical Center station on the El Monte Busway for the Metro J Line and Foothill Transit Silver Streak is located within walking distance from LA General. Additionally, Metro lines 74, 78, 251, 605 serve the hospital.

== Deaths ==
- George de Rue Meiklejohn (1857–1929).
- Kiko Bejines (1962–1983)
- Vera-Ellen (1921–1981)
- Daveigh Chase (1990–2026)

== See also ==
- No más bebés
- Knocking, a documentary on Jehovah's Witnesses, featuring LAC+USC Medical Center
- Linda Vista Community Hospital
