= Nancy Hernandez =

American woman jailed for refusing sterilization

Nancy Hernandez (born c. 1945) is an American who was a 21-year-old resident and mother of two in Santa Barbara, California, in 1966, when she was ordered to be sterilized or be imprisoned. Nancy pleaded guilty that year for being with her boyfriend, Joseph Sanchez, while he used illegal narcotics. The Santa Barbara County judge that presided over the trial, Santa Barbara Municipal Court Judge Frank P. Kearney, requested that if she wanted to receive probation then she must submit to sterilization. The judge's decision channeled eugenic principles to assert that if Hernandez acts immorally then she should not be allowed to have more children. Nancy was one of many Latina women who were attempted to be forcibly sterilized. Many women of color across the United States who were asked to submit to sterilization, coerced into sterilization, or did not consent to sterilization. Hernandez did not submit to forced sterilization and instead was sentenced to three months in jail. Her court-ordered attorney submitted a writ of habeas corpus to the superior court, which was granted by the judge. Hernandez was released to her probation officer and the sterilization provision of her probation order was removed. Her case was the first to receive national attention for sentences that called for sterilization of minority women.

== Background ==
In 1950-1960 state legislators tried to pass laws for sterilization as punishment for conceiving illegitimately. However, these laws failed to pass. Instead, judges across the United States used sterilization for punishment of crimes calling these men and women unfit.

== Biography ==
Nancy Hernandez, born in California about 1945, was married to Tony Hernandez in 1962 at the age of seventeen. Three years later, on December 3, 1965, she received an interlocutory divorce. She had two daughters, one with Hernandez who was born about 1964 and another born in 1966. Upon the birth of her daughter, Hernandez and her daughters lived with in Santa Barbara, California, with Joseph Sanchez who was the father of her younger daughter. Hernandez received welfare.

Police processed a search warrant to search Hernandez and Sanchez's apartment which was found to have marijuana. Most sources state that she was found in a home with marijuana. The Ohio Law Journal states that there was also heroin present. She was arrested for violating Section 11556 of the California Health and Safety Code for being in a room with narcotics. The charge was a misdemeanor with a maximum of six years in jail. She pleaded guilty to knowing and living in a home were narcotics were used. The probation report stated that "she is a likeable person, apparently easily influenced by her associations, that she appears genuinely sorry for having committed the offense, that she has no prior criminal record". The probation officer recommended that she be held under probation for three years during which she was to refrain from associating with narcotic users and could not frequent any place where narcotics were sold.

== Judicial ruling ==
The judge that was over the trial, Judge Kearney, requested that if she wanted to get probation over a six-month jail term then she must submit to sterilization, a surgical procedure. The judge's reason behind his decision was that if she acts immorally then she should not be allowed to have more children. However, this is not all that Nancy Hernandez would go on to be known for. Her case was one of many for Mexican American and Indigenous-American women in America. The practice of sterilizing women of color became a normal practice for punishment. The Author, Rebecca Kluchin discusses in her book, Fit to be Tied: Sterilization and Reproductive Rights in America, 1950-1980, how women deemed to be unfit mothers were forced into involuntary sterilization. This practice existed well through the twentieth century and was a form of eugenics and neo-eugenics to control minority populations in America. In Herndandez's case, it was assumed that because she was a minority and in the presence of marijuana that she naturally would descend to non-moral conduct and should not have children. Kearney's main goal was to reduce the state's welfare expenditures through forced sterilization.

Hernandez inevitably did not submit to forced sterilization and instead was sentenced to three months in jail.

== Appeal ==
Her court-appointed attorney, Louis Renga, filed a writ of habeas corpus with the superior court. Hernandez's lawyer stated that Judge Kearney was using Hernandez to make the public consider what is moral or immoral and his decision was based on neo-eugenic principles. C. Douglas Smith of the Superior Court granted the writ. Hernandez was released to her probation officer, serving only a few hours of her three-month sentence. The sterilization provision was stricken from the probation order.

In his opinion, the Judge C. Douglas Smith stated:

In our Country we are a people governed under law and not by the whims and caprice of men in power. . . . The courts and judges in the Judicial Branch may not enact laws nor may they set aside a law if it is constitutionally valid. They may affect law by judicial interpretation where its meaning is in doubt but they may not create a law where none exists nor may they alter the plain meaning of a statute to conform to their personal beliefs .... Judges may not ignore a law simply because they do not like it or believe in it.... Nor may a court act in excess of the power given it under the law. If an officer of the executive branch of government or a judge of the judicial branch should be permitted to act contrary to law or in excess of the power given him by law, this would mark a departure from our fundamental concept of rule by law and it would mean a reverting back to rule by men, that is to say rule in accordance with the whim, caprice and prejudices of men in power. This is wholly repugnant to our concept of government.

== Aftermath and legacy ==
Upon her release, Hernandez lived with her sister and brother-in-law in Santa Barbara. In 1967, she was married to Sanchez by Judge Kearney, the man who had sentenced her to sterilization.

According to researcher Luis Quinones, by standing up against sterilization as a sentence, her case is one of the important events in Hispanic history in the United States. Although many women of color were subject to sterilization practices, Latina women were subjected seven times the rate of white and African American women throughout the twentieth century. Nancy's was the first case to reach national and public attention and resulted in protests on women's rights and reproductive rights across the country.

== See also ==
- Eugenics in California
- Sterilization of Native American women
