= Antonia Hernández =

American lawyer

- Born: 1948 (age 77–78); Torreón, Mexico
- Education: University of California, Los Angeles (BA, JD)
- Political party: Democratic
- Spouse: Michael Stern

Antonia Hernández (born 1948) is an attorney, activist, and philanthropist. Hernández was counsel for the plaintiffs in Madrigal v. Quilligan (1975), a class-action lawsuit filed by ten women of Mexican descent who were involuntarily sterilized at the Los Angeles County Hospital. She is also the first Latina woman to serve as staff counsel to the U.S. Senate Judiciary Committee from 1979 to 1980. In addition, Hernández served on the campaign team for Senator Ted Kennedy in his 1980 presidential campaign. She served as president and general counsel of the Mexican American Legal Defense and Education Fund (MALDEF) from 1985 to 2004.

== Early life and education ==
Hernández was born in Torreon, Mexico in 1948 on a communal ranch to parents Manuel and Nicolasa Hernández. Her grandparents and father, born in the United States, were subject to the forced migration practices of Mexican Repatriation during the Great Depression. After moving to the United States in 1956 at the age of seven, she settled with her family at the Maravilla Housing Projects of East Los Angeles.

Hernández started school in Los Angeles, despite knowing little English. However, she had a major desire to learn, in addition to a teacher realizing her potential, so she was able to excel in school at a young age.

After graduating from Garfield High School, Hernández attended the University of California Los Angeles, earning a bachelor's degree in History in 1970. She then enrolled in the UCLA School of Law, where she earned her J.D. degree in 1974.

== Professional career ==
In 1975, Hernández was employed by the Los Angeles Center for Law and Justice and immediately became involved with her landmark case Madrigal v. Quilligan, combating the practice of involuntary sterilization of minority women at the discretion of hospital staff. While the ruling was in favor of the defendants, new measures regarding consent were implemented as a result of the case.

From 1979 to 1980, Hernández served as the first Latina staff counsel to the United States Senate Judiciary Committee under Senator Ted Kennedy. Her work mostly consisted of issues involving immigration, but she also dealt with other issues such as civil rights and judicial nominations.

Hernández was chosen by Senator Ted Kennedy to serve on the campaign team for his 1980 presidential run. She was hired by David Boies and initially was the Southwest campaign coordinator, helping run the campaign in many different states such as Texas, Louisiana, and Arizona.

In 1981, Hernández was hired by the Mexican American Legal Defense and Education Fund (MALDEF) to work as Regional counsel in Washington, D.C. She was elected president and general counsel of the organization in 1985. In 1987, she was fired after being accused of mishandling a major lawsuit in Texas involving discriminatory hiring and promotion practices against Latinos. Hernández was accused of having a conflict of interest because the defendants' attorney, Vilma Martinez was a former head of MALDEF. MALDEF received $150,000 in legal fees, and Martinez received $32,000, with the three plaintiffs receiving $8,000 each, resulting in criticism in MALDEF's management of the litigation. After filing her own lawsuit against MALDEF, she was reinstated.

From 1984 to 1995, Hernández led MALDEF in a case against the State of Texas on the basis of discrimination against students in underfunded school districts, citing that Texas public school funding led to economic and racial disparities between school districts. This case was resolved in 1995, when the Texas Supreme Court ruled that the Texas Legislature had authority to require shared funding between school districts. Hernández worked on a similar case in California, highlighting the disparities existing between funding for urban and suburban schools. In addition, during her time as MALDEF president, Hernández led the establishment of bilingual and multicultural programs for Latino students in Denver, Colorado; helped in the expansion of higher education programs for Latinos in South Texas; and advocated for the creation of legislature in California that allowed for undocumented students to pay the same tuition as other in-state students at any public university.

In February 2004, Hernández resigned from MALDEF and joined the California Community Foundation (CCF) as president and CEO.

In addition to her work with CCF, Hernández is a board member of several local and national organizations, including the American Automobile Association, the Automobile Club of Southern California, Center on Budget and Policy Priorities, Council on Foundations, Grameen America. She is also a fellow of the American Law Institute and the American Academy of Arts and Sciences.

== Awards and honors ==
Hernández was awarded an honorary Doctor of Humane Letters (L.H.D.) degree from Whittier College in 1998 and Brown University in 2016.
