= Eugenics in California =

- Part of eugenics in the United States
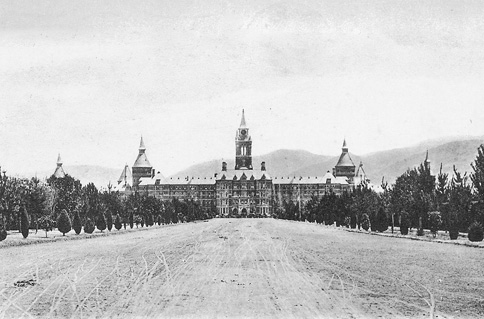
- The Napa State Hospital
- Date: 1909–1979
- Location: California
- Type: Forced sterilization
- Target: Disabled people People with mental illness
- Outcome: 20,000 sterilizations in California

Eugenics in California is a notable part of eugenics in the United States. As an early leading force in the field of eugenics, California became the third state in the United States to enact a sterilization law. By 1921, California had accounted for 80% of sterilizations nationwide. This continued until the Civil Rights Movement, when widespread critiques against society's "total institutions" dismantled popular acceptance for the state's forced sterilizations. There were an estimated 20,000 forced sterilizations in California between 1909 and 1979; however, that number may be an underestimation. In 2021, California enacted a reparations program to compensate the hundreds of still living victims from its eugenics program.

== General forms of eugenics ==
In California, "[eugenics] was always linked to the use of land: to agriculture and plant hybridization". Many of the powerful social workers, doctors, psychiatrists, and biologists, sought to hurt many of California's Mexican, Native American, and Asian populations through the exclusionary laws that those scientists proposed. In addition to the conquest to hurt the "undesirables" in the state, the California Eugenics plan also was a way to save the state money so they could eliminate the money the state spends on welfare and other programs that help the less fortunate. Eugenics takes three forms in California:

1. limiting the number of children for whom a woman on welfare can get state support,
2. coercing women of color who need a caesarean section, and women dependent on illicit drugs, to surrender reproductive capacities and
3. requiring contraception use as a term of probation. In previous years, California had focused on applying eugenics indirectly to humans as a form of "societal benefit". Now, the eugenicists of the state only focus their resources to save the state money.

California is thought of by some as a Eugenics trailblazer in the time before the Nazis used it as an excuse to commit mass murder. Historians have estimated from 1909 to 1963, some 20,000 people were sterilized in California asylums and hospitals. In 1933 alone, at least 1,278 coercive sterilizations were conducted, out of which 700 were women. In 1933, the state's top two sterilization facilities were Sonoma State Home (388 operations) and Patton State Hospital (363 operations). Other state hospitals with sterilization centers included Agnews State Hospital, Mendocino State Hospital, Napa State Hospital, Metropolitan State Hospital, Stockton State Hospital, and Pacific Colony. In the 1930s and 1940s, three more hospitals for the mentally unstable were constructed (Camarillo State Hospital, DeWitt State Hospital, and Modesto State Hospital), resulting in a total of nine hospitals for the mentally insane in California to nine by the end of the sterilization period.

== California prisons ==
In 1909 a eugenics law was passed in California allowing for state institutions to sterilize those deemed "unfit" or "feeble-minded". The Asexualization Act authorized the involuntary sterilization of certain groups of people, including inmates of state hospitals, certain institutionalized people, life-sentenced prisoners, repeat offenders of certain sexual offenses, or simply repeat offenders. As one of the leading states in forced sterilization victims, California's sterilization procedures primarily took place in state mental hospitals. Leo Stanley was one of the first people to bring the eugenics movement to California's prisons.

Stanley was San Quentin penitentiary's chief surgeon and was particularly interested in eliminating those deemed "unfit" for society. His avid eugenic-based surgeries were the first of its kind to be seen in a prison. Taking place between 1913 and 1941, the peak of the eugenics movement, Stanley's surgeries were driven by the idea of purifying criminals. Through testicular surgeries, he believed he could cultivate socially 'fit' individuals by replacing a prisoner's testicles with those of a deceased male previously deemed socially 'fit'. His practices spawned early ideologies of "white manhood", which stemmed from his belief that he could "help a new, ideal man emerge".

Use of human and even animal testicles made Stanley's procedures highly unsuccessful and all around bizarre. His desire to restore social morality, along with his fascination with the endocrine system, fueled his research. Throughout the time of his procedures, criminals were believed to have something anatomically off that drove them to commit crimes. This belief inspired Stanley to explore the endocrine system's role in the criminology of a person. By persuading inmates that his testicular surgeries would produce favorable results in their sex lives he sterilized more than 600 prisoners by the end of his career. Stanley's prison work concluded upon the start of World War II where he served overseas, only to retire as a eugenic pioneer.

== Human Betterment Foundation ==
The Human Betterment Foundation (HBF) was established in Pasadena, California, in 1928. Led by E.S. Gosney, the HBF sought to dispel the critics of sterilization by publishing authoritative, scientific reports demonstrating the benefits of sexual surgery for mental patients, their families, and society, as well as to encourage the wider application of eugenic sterilization laws at the state, national, and international levels. In 1929 E.S. Gosney set up the HBF and gathered 25 of the leading scientists, philanthropists, and community leaders to carry out research on the effects of sterilization for thirteen years (Valone). Gosney also used the HBF to distribute the product of his research, "Sterilization for Human Betterment", which attracted attention from the nearby university, the California Institute of Technology (Caltech). Robert A. Millikan, a leading faculty member and proponent of Caltech, was looking for potential donors to the university and shared many of Gosney's views in his work decided to join the HBF board. The HBF asserted that sterilization was neither mutilation nor punishment, and it sought to dispel the widely held view that sterilization inhibited or increased sexual promiscuity. It was revealed that nearly 10 million Americans had "eugenically undesirable children", and that it would take a single generation of vigorous sterilization to reduce the incidences of "mental abnormalities" by nearly 40%.

Lois Gosney Castle and the board of trustees eventually liquidated the foundation and turned the proceeds over to Caltech. Thirteen years after publishing the 1929 report entitled "Sterilization for Human Betterment", the HBF continued to carry out research on the effects of sterilization and undertook widespread distribution of the report to individuals, public libraries, and schools. After the liquidation, files were found in 1968, but since they contained personal medical information, they were legally closed to researchers. Following Gosney's death in 1942, the Trustees of the Human Betterment Foundation agreed that transferring the Foundation's activities to the California Institute of Technology would be in the best interests of the Foundation.

== Madrigal v. Quilligan ==
Dolores Madrigal entered the University of Southern California's medical center on October 12, 1973, in order to give birth to her second child. During her time in labor, she was given a consent form and coerced by doctors into having a tubal ligation, effectively sterilizing her. Madrigal insisted that "No one at the medical center informed me that a tubal ligation operation was going to be performed on me. No one at the medical center informed me of what a tubal ligation operation consists nor of its permanent effects" (Enoch, 5). Rebecca M. Kluchin found while researching the case that "Physicians preferred to perform cesarean sections and tubal ligations in tandem to minimize risks associated with infection and anesthesia, as well as to reduce medical costs. It appears that at this hospital physicians who performed emergency cesarean sections sometimes used the opportunity to persuade a woman to accept permanent contraception".

In July 1976, Madrigal sued the University of Southern California medical center, accompanied by Guadalupe Acosta, Estela Benavides, Consuelo Hermosillo, Georgina Hernandez, Maria Hurtado, Maria Figueroa, Rebecca Figueroa, Jovita Rivera, and Helena Orozco. Each of the nine other women who joined the class action lawsuit complained of similar proceedings. Together, these 10 chicanas decided to sue the USC medical center, contending that they had never given their informed consent to have the tubal ligation procedure performed. Karen Benker testified concerning discussions with then head of Obstetrics and Gynecology, Edward James Quilligan, in which he asserted that "poor minority women in L.A. County were having too many babies; that it was a strain on society; and that it was good that they be sterilized".

Despite Benker's testimony and other corroborating evidence, Judge Jesse Curtis ruled in favor of the defendants, stating that there had been nothing more than "a breakdown in communication between the patients and the doctors" (Stern 1135). He went on to say that it was appropriate for an obstetrician to believe that a tubal ligation could help diminish overpopulation as long as they did not attempt to "overpower the will of his patients".

== Californian eugenicists ==
- David Starr Jordan: Founding president of Stanford University and chairman of the American Eugenics Commission, vice-president of the American Society for Social Hygiene, and vice-president of the Eugenics Education Society of London.
- Charles Goethe: First chairman of the board of trustees for California State University, Sacramento and founder of the Eugenics Society of Northern California.
- Ulysses Sigel Webb: Attorney General of California for 37 years, and enthusiastic promoter of the Californian forced sterilization laws.
- Frederick Winslow Hatch: Secretary of the State Lunacy Commission in California, and later became the General Superintendent of State Hospitals.
- Ezra Seymour Gosney: Philanthropist to the first California council of the Boy Scouts of America and donated $12,500 to Polytechnic School. He founded the Human Betterment Foundation and under its name authored numerous publications promoting eugenics including, "Sterilization for Human Betterment: A Summary of Results of 6,000 Operations in California, 1909–1929".
- Lewis Terman: Creator of the IQ test, and member of the eugenic group, the Human Betterment Foundation. A middle school in Palo Alto California, Terman Middle School was named after him until it was renamed in 2018.
- Robert Andrews Millikan: Director of the Norman Bridge Laboratory of Physics at the California Institute of Technology (Caltech) in Pasadena, California, winner of the Nobel Prize for Physics, and member of the Human Betterment Foundation.
- Paul Popenoe: Based in Los Angeles, he was a leading advocate of the compulsory sterilization of mentally ill people and those with mental disabilities; he was a national leader in marriage counseling.

== California Assembly Bill AB-1007 Forced or Involuntary Sterilization Compensation Program.(2021-2022) ==
The 2021-22 state budget package included funding $7.5 million for the California Forced or Involuntary Sterilization Compensation Program legislation, to begin Jan. 1, 2022, administered by the California Victim Compensation Board (CalVCB), for survivors of state-sponsored sterilization 1909 through 1979 and survivors of involuntary sterilizations in women’s prisons after 1979 to ask about and apply for compensation (consult this website or reach out to CalVCB at 800-777-9229 or fiscp@victims.ca.gov). Researchers estimated hundreds of Californians are alive who might hypothetically qualify before the December 2023 deadline, but reportedly as of early September 2023, only 101 applications had been approved, with seven cases closed as incomplete, and 339 denied.

== State records ==
Records of eugenics practices in California are held at the following agencies and institutions. Some records are still protected for confidentiality reasons.

- California State Archives, Sacramento
  - Sonoma State Hospital Records
  - Mendocino State Hospital Records
  - Modesto State Hospital Records
  - Stockton State Hospital Records
  - Modesto State Hospital Records
  - California Youth Authority/Whittier State Home Records
  - Department of Mental Hygiene Records (incomplete)
  - Legislative Histories (microfilm)
- Patton State Hospital
  - Patton State Hospital Records
- Napa State Hospital
  - Napa (Fairview) State Hospital Records
- CSU Channel Islands, John Spoor Broome Library
  - Dewitt State Hospital Record
  - Camarillo State Hospital Records

== See also ==
- Nancy Hernandez, sentenced to sterilization in 1966
