= VisualDx =

- Release: 2001; 25 years ago
- Platform: PC, iPad/iPhone, Android tablet/phone
- Type: Clinical decision support system
- License: Proprietary
- Website: www.visualdx.com

VisualDx is clinical decision support system (CDSS) software intended to be used by medical practitioners, including primary care practitioners, to assist them in differential diagnosis. In one of its modes of operation, after a healthcare provider enters some basic facts about the patient, VisualDx presents peer-reviewed photographs or diagrams of medical conditions such as skin conditions, ordered from the most to the least likely, to assist in diagnosis. The system holds over 100,000 images. Other modes of operation include searching for medication that a patient has been taking, to find possible adverse drug reactions that they may be suffering from.

VisualDx is used in 2,300 hospitals and clinics, and is used for teaching in over 90 US medical schools. It is sold as a yearly or monthly subscription service and a 30-day free trial is available.

VisualDx is produced by a company of the same name based in Rochester, New York. It was co-founded by Lowell Goldsmith, MD, and Art Papier, MD, both professors of dermatology at the University of Rochester.
