= Madrigal v. Quilligan =

1978 federal class action lawsuit

Madrigal v. Quilligan was a 1978 federal class action lawsuit from Los Angeles County, California, involving sterilization of Latina women that occurred either without informed consent, or through coercion. Although the judge ruled in favor of the doctors, the case led to better informed consent for patients, especially those who are not native English speakers.

== Background ==
California had one of the highest sterilization rates in the country during the time of Madrigal v. Quilligan. The eugenics movement, which was part of the sterilization campaign, strived to deem those unfit for procreating as candidates for sterilization. There was also a funding program enacted that gave money to states based on the amount of sterilization procedures performed. Beginning in 1909, these procedures were supported by federal agencies that began to disperse funds in conjunction with the family planning initiative. With support from the federal government and an influx of immigrants from Mexico, California saw some of the highest rates of sterilization. Forced sterilizations occurred in part due to the notion that immigrant families would put a strain on fiscal budgets, and thus sterilization offered a means of population control, as well as lifelong birth control. In the case of Madrigal v. Quilligan, many unsuspecting women were coerced to sign paperwork to perform sterilization, while others were told that the process could be reversed. None of the women were fluent in English.

== Connections to the Chicano Movement ==
From the 1960s to 1970s, the Chicano Movement was a social and political movement to advocate against the previous racism of citizens of Mexican descent, who were often marginalized in the United States. The fight for equality started long before the movement, but activists consolidated their efforts during the 1960s when race was an extremely prevalent issue in America. When the case of Madrigal v. Quilligan surfaced to the public, the leaders of the Chicano movement recognized that sterilization was another injustice that was targeted to Mexican and middle-class women. An important part of Mexican culture is the ability of mothers to have children and have enough sons to support their husbands. This case connected to a broader topic of human reproduction in the Chicano movement. Latina women were seen as "hyper fertile" and their "children are sometimes called anchor babies." Even though the women did not win their case, they were able to cause a significant amount of change for women in the future with the amount of attention Latina women's reproduction rights were receiving. The case led to hospitals making the patient more aware about what sterilization does to their fertility and consent forms were easier to read for women whose first language was not English.

== Case ==
Decided: June 7, 1978 (Central District of California, Docket Number: CV-75-2057-EC) Affirmed by the Court of Appeals for the Ninth Circuit at 639 F.2d 789.

Plaintiff: 10 sterilized women

Defendant: James Quilligan (County hospital obstetricians). In addition to Quilligan, hospital officials doctor John Doe and executive director Jerry Bosworth as well as federal officials Mario Obledo, Secretary of Health, Jerome Lackner, the director of the California Department of Health, and Caspar Weinberger, the Secretary of the US Department of Health, Education, and Welfare, were also defendants.

Prosecutors: Antonia Hernandez and Charles Nabarrete of the Los Angeles Center for Law and Justice

Charges: Through the lawsuit, the plaintiffs and the lawyers had three goals in mind: strengthening federal and state policies on voluntary and informed consent for sterilization, acquiring financial compensation for the women, and demanding that someone be held accountable for the tubal ligations performed. Hospital officials, however, asserted that they believed their actions were not criminal, always kept the health and safety of the women in mind, and never coerced the women into sterilization. The plaintiffs charged that their civil and constitutional rights to bear children had been violated, and that between 1971 and 1974, they had been forcibly sterilized by obstetricians at County Hospital. Specifically, they signed consent forms under duress, hours or minutes before or after labor, or had never been informed, or had been misinformed, that their "tubes would be tied." Some women alleged that they were forced to sign papers that gave the doctors the right to perform these operations under coerced circumstances or under false impressions. One of the women for whom the case gets its name, Dolores Madrigal, signed the sterilization paperwork because they had told her that her husband had already approved and signed the paperwork, when indeed he had not.

=== Important points in the case ===
1. Only one key witness, Karen Benker, spoke out against the doctors. She testified that James Quilligan had said such things as "poor minority women in L.A. County were having too many babies; that it was a strain on society; and that it was good to be sterilized." In addition, Benker described that the abusive practices of the hospital stemmed from the stigma of Mexican-American women as "hyper-fertile" and the hospital had received a federal grant to try to cut the birth rate among Mexicans and Blacks in LA County. In the end, the judge dismissed the relevance of her testimony.
2. Anthropologist Carlos Velez-Ibanez discussed in his argument that since motherhood was the essence of Mexican women's identity, they wanted to have many children. Thus, forced sterilization, even after the fifth or sixth child, was particularly inappropriate to Mexicans and served as a kind of "cultural sterilization". His statement describes the motherhood of Mexican women of the old way of life, before their arrival to the United States. In another part of his testimony, he discussed the idea of eugenics within the hospital. He testified that he had found ample evidence of eugenics-infused attitudes among area doctors, including some listed on the Medical Center staff."
3. The case was not subject to a jury, as the lawyers declined in favor of a decision from judge Jesse Curtis overseeing the case. The judge recognized the language barrier between the defendants and plaintiffs. Judge Curtis ruled that there was no deliberate intent by the doctors to hurt the women.
4. The women in the case were not welfare beneficiaries. However, some women that were also forcefully sterilized were persuaded through threats to cut off their welfare access, which was why some women feared the loss of that income and proceeded with the procedure.

=== Important witnesses ===
Other than Benker and the plaintiffs, the prosecution called multiple witnesses to testify for the case.

- First, they called Don Sloan, a New York gynecologist, who testified that women in deep labor, basically all of the plaintiffs, were unable to give informed consent for sterilization. Prosecutors used Sloan's testimony to portray that under all circumstances, the doctors did not take adequate care to ensure that consent was fully given by the patients.
- Next, prosecutors called a handwriting expert that examined the consent forms alongside the women's initial signature when admitted. He asserted that there was a dramatic difference between the two indicating that they were in pain when they supposedly consented.
- Finally, cultural anthropologist Carlos Velez Ibanez was called to testify about the harmful results of the sterilizations on the women. From his observations of the women, he concluded that the sterilization and resulting inability to have children, led to the women having weaker relationships with their husbands, heightened aggression with their children, and an acute case of depression due to a broken sense of self identity and purpose. Ibanez donated his research notes to help document the trial.

=== Plaintiffs ===
For the case, attorneys Antonia Hernandez and Charles Navarrete and Gloria Molina, a leader of the Chicana feminist movement, sought out and interviewed women sterilized at the Los Angeles County Hospital. Bernard Rosenfeld was the whistleblower that first brought attention to the problem within the USC hospital. Rosenfeld, so horrified by the practices he witnessed while at the hospital, gathered evidence of the unlawful sterilizations and wrote letters to civil rights groups and journalists. When Hernandez and Navarrete's legal group discovered the case, they, along with leaders in the Chicana feminist movement, began to interview the women found on the released medical records from the hospital. Many of the women did not even know that they had been sterilized and also thought that the procedure was reversible. Gloria Molina played a large role in convincing the ten Plaintiffs, mainly from East Los Angeles, to come forward and testify with their stories. From their stories, four similarities emerged in the way that the women were sterilized by medical staff. First, some women were repeatedly asked to give consent while in labor pains and sometimes heavily medicated. Second, almost all the Latina women had to resist multiple attempts by doctors and nurses to submit to sterilization. Third, because of the language barrier and the lack of access to sterilization forms in Spanish, many of the plaintiffs were uniformed regarding the effects and needs of their tubal ligations. Fourth, some of the women never actually signed the form for the doctors just waived consent.

==== Maria Hurtado ====
Maria Hurtado headed into the LA County Hospital and was informed that she needed an emergency caesarean section. While under the influence of anti-pain medication and labor pain, she signed a consent form thinking it was for the c-section operation, when in fact it was for sterilization. She did not know that had been sterilized until she returned to the hospital for a check-up six weeks later.

==== Rebecca Figueroa ====
Similarly to Hurtado, Rebecca Figueroa was also sent in for an emergency c-section and signed two English consent forms, which she was unable to read, believing that they were for the c-section.

==== Helena Orozco ====
Helena Orozco testified that she had to repeatedly turn down urges by medical staff for complete sterilization. As her labor progressed and while in extreme pain on the operation table, the doctors asked her again to be sterilized, and she finally gave in.

==== Georgina Hernández ====
Georgina Hernandez was one of the women who never consented to a tubal ligation, but was sterilized by doctors anyway. When she came into the hospital experiencing lots of bleeding and pain, she denied the initial push for sterilization. Later, she was asked again while in labor and going into the emergency room for a c-section and remained firm in her refusal for sterilization. However, despite her clearly not giving consent, the doctor told staff that she agreed to sterilization before the operation. She found out that she was no longer able to have children 3 weeks later.

==== Dolores Madrigal ====
Dolores Madrigal, the woman for whom the case is named, had refused multiple attempts for sterilization by the medical staff. In the midst of extreme labor pain, she heard the nurse tell her husband that she could die if she had another child. Thus, while in labor she signed the form without knowledge of what the form actually said. Like other women, she too believed that the process was reversible.

==== Estella Benavides ====
Similar to Madrigal, Estella Benavides was also told that another pregnancy could kill her, so while in labor, she signed the consent form for sterilization. In her testimony she recounted that she did not think that is would be permanent and the doctors claimed that they were protecting her, when in fact they coerced her into an uninformed sterilization.

==== Maria Figueroa ====
Maria Figueroa was under anesthesia and in labor while the doctor was asking for her consent to sterilization. Under the pressure of the doctor and in extreme discomfort, she consented to sterilization if the baby was a boy, but when she gave birth to a girl, the doctor sterilized her anyway. She did not officially give consent at all because no forms were signed, yet Figueroa was sterilized anyway.

==== Guadalupe Acosta ====
Guadalupe Acosta's child was born deceased and she was sterilized after her c-section procedure. She never signed any consent forms and only found out about her sterilization when she returned to the hospital two months later for birth control.

==== Jovita Rivera ====
"Jovita Rivera said a doctor told her she should have her 'tubes tied' because her children were a burden on the government ..." —Los Angeles Times, June 19, 1975

Jovita Rivera was under anesthesia after her c-section procedure and testified that she could not remember anything, yet the doctor insisted that she verbally consented to the sterilization procedure. She was unaware that the sterilization was irreversible and no consent form was signed.

==== Consuelo Hermosillo ====
"And this lady came, I don’t remember seeing her face, I just remember her voice telling me, 'Mijita, you better sign those papers or your baby could probably die here.'"—Consuelo Hermosillo, interview.

Medical staff informed Consuelo Hermosillo that she was "high-risk" and thus could die from having another baby in an attempt to persuade her to give consent to sterilization. While in labor and awaiting surgery for c-section, the medical staff told Hermosillo that she could not continue with her c-section until she consented to tubal ligation. It extremely upset her, but in order to keep her baby alive, she signed the consent form.

=== Ruling ===
In an unpublished opinion, the Judge sided with the County Hospital, citing that the doctors had the interest of the patients in mind when deciding to pursue these procedures and that the doctors did not do anything wrong. He conveyed that the procedure was not objectionable if a physician believed that a tubal ligation could improve a perceived overpopulation problem, as long as said physician did not try to "overpower the will of his patients." Additionally, Judge Curtis asserted that there was just a breakdown in communication between the doctors and patients. Furthermore, he believed he could not charge doctors of sterilizing without consent because many of the women signed the consent forms. He also ruled that the women's emotional breakdowns after sterilization were caused by their inability to give birth and raise a big family, which is an important part of their Latina culture, and not by the sterilization itself. In the end, he believed that the women were at fault and it was their cultural background that heightened the supposed trauma that they experienced.

=== Results from the ruling ===
- Forms in multiple languages would be made available for the patient to understand the procedures and accept or decline.
- Patients under 21 years of age would have 72 hours to think about this choice.
- Welfare benefits would not be terminated.
- A subsequent appeal was later filed on October 19, 1979, but it was denied and not pursued further because the new practices were being utilized.
- Hispanic women were now more informed of their rights with regard to sterilization.
- The MALDEF CRP was established in 1974. This was a group that advocated for women's rights and informed Hispanic women to be aware of what was going on with their doctors and to report any kind of abuse.

== Legacy ==
The case has become a significant point of reference in discussions of reproductive rights, medical ethics, and informed consent in the United States. Although the plaintiffs did not prevail in court, Madrigal v. Quilligan contributed to changes in hospital and government policies regarding sterilization procedures. Following the case, California hospitals increasingly adopted multilingual consent forms, expanded the use of qualified medical interpreters, and strengthened informed consent procedures for patients with limited English proficiency. Federal and state guidelines also emphasized waiting periods and clearer documentation before elective sterilization procedures could be performed. These reforms sought to reduce the risk of coercion and ensure that patients fully understood the permanent nature of sterilization before giving consent.

The case has also been widely examined by historians, legal scholars, and public health researchers as an example of the intersection of immigration, race, gender, and reproductive policy in twentieth-century America. It is frequently discussed alongside the broader history of eugenics and involuntary sterilization in the United States and is considered an important case in the development of the reproductive justice movement. The experiences of the plaintiffs have been incorporated into academic research, university curricula, museum exhibits, and documentaries addressing the history of reproductive rights and medical discrimination in the United States.

== See also ==
- Sterilization of Latinas
- No más bebés
- List of class-action lawsuits
