= California Community Foundation =

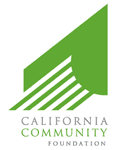
- Formation: 1915
- Location: Los Angeles, California
- Region served: Los Angeles County; Worldwide
- Method: Donations and Grants
- Key people: Antonia Hernández; President & CEO Hon. Gloria Molina; Board of Directors Chair James E. Berliner; Board of Directors Chair Emeritus
- Endowment: US$1.9 Billion in Assets(2020)
- Website: www.calfund.org

The California Community Foundation (CCF) is a philanthropic organization located in Los Angeles, California. Foundation Center, an independent nonprofit organization, ranks it among the top 100 foundations in the nation by asset size and total giving. Among all community foundations, CCF is 5th by total giving and 7th by asset size, as of the fiscal year that ended 6/30/12.

== Mission statement ==
CCF states it is dedicated to strengthening communities of Los Angeles County through philanthropy and civic engagement. It fulfills its mission through fundraising, charitable fund management, grantmaking, and meetings with donors, financial advisors, local nonprofits and foundation partners. It also serves as an advocate for the vulnerable and poor.

== History ==
The CCF was founded in 1915 by Joseph Sartori. For 65 years, the foundation made grants mostly for equipment and capital.

== Program areas ==
CCF provides grants and other support to a range of local nonprofits with an emphasis on helping vulnerable populations and strengthening communities of L.A. County in five areas.

The Arts Program aims to strengthen the cultural vitality of L.A. County by increasing the operational capacity of small and mid-size arts and cultural organizations, increasing arts opportunities that are affordable and accessible to underserved communities, and improving participation in the arts by diverse, low-income residents and professional artists.

The Education Program focuses on improving school readiness and K-5 student performance in reading and math while supporting partnerships among schools, districts, teachers and parents that demonstrate a commitment to this goal.

The Health Care Program seeks to improve access to regular, sustainable and affordable sources of quality health care for low-income adults and children, with a focus on community clinics and uninsured individuals.

The Housing and Neighborhoods Program concentrates on increasing access to affordable housing and efforts that emphasize multiservice, geographically focused approaches to improve the conditions of underserved neighborhoods. In conjunction with this program, the Community Foundation Land Trust of CCF buys land, works with private and public partners that obtain financing and approvals to build, and then ensures that they remain affordable homes for decades to come.

Foundation grants are also made on a limited basis to nonprofits for adults with developmental disabilities, aging adults, animal welfare, disaster relief, and transitional-age foster youth. Donor advised grants comprise the majority of annual grantmaking by CCF and may be directed to worthwhile causes and qualified organizations anywhere in the world.

== Civic engagement ==
CCF believes the actions of ordinary people can affect the outcomes of larger issues in their lives through collective engagement and shared problem-solving, and therefore advocates and invests in civic engagement activities that foster social change. These activities include:

Immigrant Integration A concentrated effort through local nonprofits with cultural competence to integrate newcomers into the social, civic and economic fabric of life in L.A. County.

Los Angeles Citizenship Collaboration An initiative to encourage and assist eligible Legal Permanent residents to become U.S. citizens, in partnership with members of the nonprofit, public and private sectors and local funders.

Los Angeles Preschool Advocacy Initiative A multi-year effort since 2007 with the David and Lucille Packard Foundation to increase access to quality early care and education for underserved communities and to support efforts that address the child care and development needs of children, ages 0–5.

== See also ==
- UMMA Community Clinic
