= Lanterman Developmental Center =

Geography
- Location: 3530 Pomona Boulevard, Pomona, San Gabriel Valley, California, United States
- Coordinates: 34.04494°N 117.8073°W

Organization
- Funding: Public hospital
- Type: Specialist

Services
- Speciality: developmental disabilities, psychiatry

History
- Former names: Pacific Colony State Hospital, Pacific Colony and State Narcotics Hospital, Pacific State Hospital, Frank D. Lanterman State Hospital and Developmental Center
- Opened: May 2, 1927
- Closed: July 1, 2015

Links
- Lists: Hospitals in California

Lanterman Developmental Center, opened under the name the Pacific Colony, was a public psychiatric hospital and a facility serving the needs of people with developmental disabilities, and was located in the San Gabriel Valley in what was once Spadra (now part of Pomona), California. In 87 years of operation, the hospital served appropriately 14,000 people.

At the time of closure in 2015, the hospital had nine patient buildings, one acute hospital unit, a variety of training and work sites, a vocational training center, and recreation facilities, a research and staff training building, a child day care center for community and staff members' children, a credit union, and the California Conservation Corps.

== Pre-history ==
The Pacific Colony was part of a program to understand, "the problem of feeble mindedness," funded by California Legislature in 1917 and initially located in Walnut, California. The first patients were added to the program on March 20, 1921, however the site was inappropriate (in part due to a lack of water) and it was closed on January 23, 1923.

== History ==
The facility was moved to a new location (near Pomona) and re-opened on May 2, 1927. The campus sat on 302 acres, and offered 24-hour residential care for lifelong conditions like cerebral palsy, epilepsy, Down syndrome, and autism. This hospital was one of the many State of California-run asylums that had sterilization centers. The State Narcotic Hospital Spadra was a different program that shared the campus grounds. In 1953, the named was changed to the Pacific State Hospital.

In 1979, the name was changed to the Frank D. Lanterman State Hospital and Developmental Center, named after the California State Assemblyman Frank D. Lanterman who fought for the civil rights of developmentally disabled people. In 2015, the hospital was named as one of the state run facilities with cases of multiple deaths and neglect, documented between 2003 and 2012. The hospital and facility building was fully closed on July 1, 2015, the same year ownership of the property was transferred to California State Polytechnic University, Pomona.

Other California state-run hospitals that specialized in developmental disabilities included Sonoma Developmental Center, Agnews Developmental Center, Camarillo State Mental Hospital, Fairview Developmental Center, Porterville Developmental Center, Canyon Springs Developmental Center, and Sierra Vista. The television series Twin Peaks (in 2016), and Glow (in 2017) were filmed at this location.

Notable patients at the Lanterman Developmental Center include Edward Bunker.

== See also ==
- Eugenics in California
- Lanterman Developmental Disabilities Act
- List of hospitals in California
