= UMMA Community Clinic =

Healthcare clinic in Los Angeles, California

UMMA COMMUNITY CLINIC
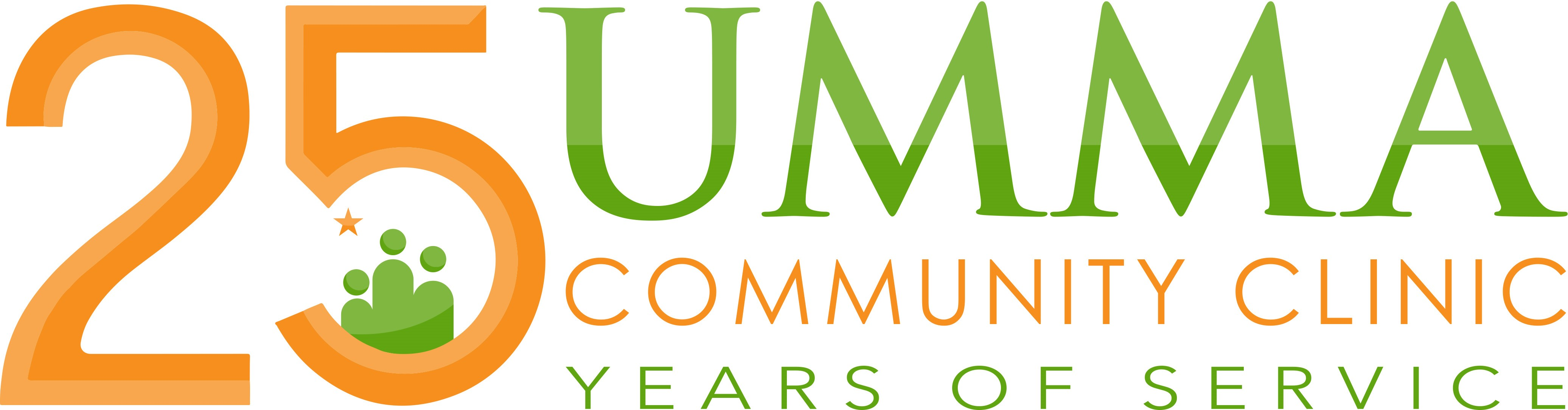
- Founded: 1996
- Purpose: Healthcare, community
- Location: Los Angeles, California
- Origins: US
- Region served: South Los Angeles (SPA 6)

University Muslim Medical Association, Inc. (UMMA) Community Clinic is the first Muslim American founded community-based health organization in the United States. Located in South Los Angeles, UMMA has a culturally and religiously diverse staff serving an equally diverse community.

== History ==
Founded by UCLA graduate students in the wake of the 1992 South Los Angeles civil unrest, UMMA initially operated as a free clinic staffed by volunteers. After an extensive fundraising campaign, UMMA officially opened its doors in 1996. Today, UMMA is a Federally Qualified Health Center (FQHC) with medical home (PCMH) recognition, and a staff of 70+ employees who provide an array of integrated healthcare services through 27,500+ annual patient visits.

UMMA is a recipient of the following Health Resources and Services Administration (HRSA) Community Health Equality Recognition badges: Health Center Quality Leader, Advancing Health Information Technology (HIT) for Quality, COVID-19 Vaccinations, and COVID-19 Data Reporter. These designations reflect UMMA's success in increasing access to care for the South Los Angeles community.

The Los Angeles County Board of Supervisors, the Los Angeles City Council, the U.S. House of Representatives, and the White House have honored UMMA for their work in South Los Angeles. The clinic was recognized by Assembly member Reginald Byron Jones-Sawyer, Sr. as the 2020 California Nonprofit of the Year for the 59th Assembly District for their commitment to increasing access to high-quality healthcare and addressing critical social needs in South Los Angeles.

== Community served ==
The South Los Angeles service area that UMMA serves has been designated by the federal government as both a Primary Care Health Professional Shortage Area (HPSA) and a Medically Underserved Area (MUA), meaning that the region is lacking in primary, dental, and mental health care providers and has a significant shortage of primary care services. South Los Angeles also has the highest number of uninsured adults in Los Angeles County.

UMMA currently operates two clinics in South Los Angeles, their Flagship Clinic (Florence Ave.) and a school-based Fremont Wellness Center (S. Avalon Blvd.). The Fremont Wellness Center is open in partnership with the Los Angeles Unified School District (LAUSD) on the John C. Fremont High School campus. The clinic serves an under resourced but culturally rich community composed of mostly Latinos (68%) and African Americans (27%). In UMMA's low-income South Los Angeles community, 34% of households have incomes less than 100% of the Federal Poverty Level (FPL).

UMMA's services include family and internal medicine, pediatrics/childhood immunizations, on-site mammography services, on-site laboratory services, Hepatitis C testing, HIV/STI testing, family/contraceptive planning, adolescent medicine, prenatal care, women's health, behavioral health services, direct referrals to local county facilities, and health education. In-house specialties include gynecology, dermatology, geriatrics, ophthalmology, renal, and nephrology.

UMMA functions as a health center working to achieve health equity through integrated primary care and behavioral health services. UMMA also has health education programming and community engagement initiatives, including the following:

- Black Visions of Wellness - This program provides mental and physical health services designed to encourage healthy growth and development in underserved African/African American communities.
- Student Health Leaders - UMMA prepares future generations to serve as peer health advocates. Student Health Leaders educate their fellow students and refer them to appropriate healthcare services at the Fremont Wellness Center.
- Community Engagement - To help heal South Los Angeles' resource deprived community, UMMA hosts events, offering health and social services.
- Health on Wheels Initiative - This initiative is focused on building community resilience through innovative collaborations between UMMA and community partners such as the LAUSD. The LAUSD's Community of Schools Initiative allows UMMA to access 40 elementary, middle, and high school campuses. The initiative utilizes local public and non-profit agencies to provide social services to students, their families, and nearby South-Central Los Angeles residents.
- Free Food Fair - Located on the grounds of John C. Fremont High School, UMMA's Fremont Wellness Center hosts a twice monthly Fremont Food Fair to address food insecurity in South Los Angeles. UMMA offers approximately 300 free food packages on a bimonthly basis and distributes over 350,000 pounds of free produce annually to community members and local nonprofit organizations.

== Key partnerships ==
- Health Resources and Services Administration
- Los Angeles Unified School District
- University of California, Los Angeles
- Charles R. Drew University of Medicine and Science
- The Los Angeles Trust for Children's Health
