= Indiana University School of Nursing =

Nursing school in the US state of Indiana

- Type: Public
- Established: 1914; 112 years ago
- Dean: Janet S. Carpenter
- Location: Indianapolis, Indiana, United States
- Campus: Urban
- Website: nursing.iu.edu

The Indiana University School of Nursing is an academic college of higher education connected to Indiana University with its main research and educational facilities on the Indiana University Indianapolis campus, as well as at the Indiana University Bloomington and Indiana University Fort Wayne. It is known for its nursing research and education, scholarship of teaching and nursing practice, and for its collaborations with IU hospitals and clinical partners. Established in 1914 as the Indiana University Training School for Nurses, it awarded its first nursing diplomas in 1917 and was renamed the IU School of Nursing in 1956. It offers a four-year Bachelor of Science in Nursing (BSN) degree, a Master of Science in Nursing (MSN) degree, and two doctoral degrees: Doctor of Nursing Practice (DNP) and Doctor of Philosophy (Ph.D.). The IU School of Nursing has received multiple research grants from the National Institutes of Health.

The National League for Nursing has designated the IU School of Nursing as a Center of Excellence in Nursing Education. The Commission on Collegiate Nursing Education has accredited the IU School of Nursing programs in Indianapolis and Bloomington.

== History ==
The Indiana University Training School for Nurses was founded in 1914 as part of the IU School of Medicine in Indianapolis. It was renamed the IU School of Nursing in 1956. The nursing school became known for its excellence in nursing research and education, scholarship of teaching and nursing practice, recruitment of well-educated faculty and school administrators, and for its collaborations with IU hospitals and clinical partners.

=== Founding in Indianapolis ===
The Indiana University Training School for Nurses was established at Indianapolis in 1914. Its first student arrived on June 19, 1914. At the time of its founding, the IU program was one of about 1,800 nursing schools in operation in the United States. It was also one of the four early nursing schools in Indiana that was affiliated with a university. The IU nursing school was planned in connection with the construction of the Robert W. Long Hospital, the IU School of Medicine's first teaching hospital. Long Hospital, which opened in 1914, was built on a 20-acre (8.1-hectare) tract of land near City Hospital, about 1 mile (1.6 km) northwest of the downtown Indianapolis (the present-day site of Indiana University – Purdue University at Indianapolis).

While Long Hospital was under construction, Doctor Charles P. Emerson, dean of the IU School of Medicine, chose Alice Fitzgerald as the first Director of the IU Training School for Nurses and the Superintendent of Nurses. (From its founding in 1914 to 1956, when it became IU's tenth academic school and was renamed the IU School of Nursing, the school's director was responsible for IU hospital's nursing staff and the education of IU nursing students.) Fitzgerald arrived in Indianapolis in the fall of 1913 to help equip the new hospital and organize the nurses training school. Fitzgerald also worked with the faculty at IU Bloomington to establish the criteria for students to earn bachelor's and nursing degrees from IU. She also established the nursing school's initial curriculum and designed its first uniforms.

Bertha Ellen Rizer of Worthington, Indiana, was the first nursing student to arrive for training on June 19, 1914. Eight other women joined Rizer to form the first class of nursing students. In 1915, its second year of operation, the nursing program had a total of seventeen enrolled students. Five students completed their three years of training in 1917 and become IU's first graduating class of nurses. They received the nursing diplomas on June 13, 1917, at commencement ceremonies on the IU campus in Bloomington, Indiana. By 1931, IU had 168 student nurses in training at Indianapolis, but enrollment declined during the Great Depression. By 1941, when the IU Training School for Nurses was first accredited by the National League for Nursing Education, it had graduated 1,300 nurses.

=== Early facilities ===
Until the completion of the IU School of Medicine's academic building (Emerson Hall) on the present-day Indiana University Indianapolis campus, nursing students attended classes at Long Hospital and at the IU medical school's facility at Market Street and Senate Avenue, which was several blocks east of the hospital. After the new building opened in 1919, nursing students used its laboratories, as well as classroom space in Long Hospital. With the opening of the James Whitcomb Riley Hospital for Children in 1924 and the William H. Coleman Hospital for Women in 1927, both of which are located on the IU Indianapolis campus, clinical training opportunities were significantly increased for nurses in the areas of pediatrics, maternity, and gynecology. Completion of the Kiwanis Wing (1930) and the Rotary Convalescent Home (1931) at Riley Hospital further expanded IU's hospital services and clinical training facilities in Indianapolis.

During its first years of operation in Indianapolis, IU had no residence halls for nurses on campus. IU hospital nurses and student nurses were housed on a private floor of Long Hospital and in nearby homes, referred to as cottages, that the university had purchased or leased. Between 1923 and 1925, small stucco cottages for nursing student housing were built near Long Hospital and after Riley Hospital was completed in 1924, a few student nurses were housed the hospital's intern and nursing wing. Increased demand for nurses and additional enrollment of nursing students made it necessary to construct additional housing.

Ball Residence for Nurses, which was dedicated on October 7, 1928, was the first permanent residence for nursing students on the IU campus in Indianapolis. Funding for its construction came from a $500,000 gift from IU trustee George A. Ball of the Ball Brothers of Muncie, Indiana. The residence hall was named in honor of the Ball family. George Ball donated an additional $10,000 to improve the landscape around Ball Residence in 1929 and create the Nurses' Sunken Garden and Convalescent Park, which included formal gardens and Robert William Davidson's bronze statue, "Eve," at the center of a fountain. The fountain and statue were installed when the garden was completed in 1934. Students nicknamed the statue "Flo" in tribute to Florence Nightingale.

In 1966, a year after construction began on IU Hospital (the present-day IU Health University Hospital), the IU School of Nursing began planning a building of its own. The new academic building on the Indianapolis campus was dedicated in May 1974.

=== Early programs ===
At a time when most nursing schools did not require students to have a high school diploma in order to enroll, IU's early nursing students had to be a high school graduate, rank in the upper third of their high school graduating class, and meet the admission requirements of the IU School of Liberal Arts. Prospective nursing students also had to have earned credits for college-level coursework from IU or another college or university before enrolling in its three-year nursing program. (Previously earned credits could shorten the hours required for the student to earn a graduate nursing diploma.) In addition, the nursing curriculum allowed students to earn a bachelor's degree after completing the required hours of courses in IU's College of Liberal Arts and the nurses training program in Indianapolis.

Faculty of the IU School of Medicine and the IU College of Liberal Arts initially provided training for nursing students in Indianapolis that included classroom lectures and demonstrations, as well as clinical training at Long Hospital. Training in psychiatric nursing was conducted nearby at Central State Hospital. Student nurses were also on duty in Long Hospital for eight hours each day, Monday through Friday, and for six hours on Sunday, until the requirement was phased out in the 1960s. After World War II, when the demand for trained nurses continued to remain high, the IU School of Education at IU Bloomington expanded its curriculum by offering its first program leading to a master's degree in nursing education.

In 1956, when the IU Training School for Nurses was renamed the IU School of Nursing, separate directors were established for the IU nursing school and hospital nursing staff. Emily Holmquist became the first dean of the IU School of Nursing in 1957, which began a new era for the School. By the late 1950s, the IU School of Nursing had become known as "a Midwestern center for nursing scholarship, teaching, research, and service," but it transitioned into a school with a national reputation for its advanced nursing programs and research.

In the late 1950s, the IU nursing school began its first global training programs and made changes to its curriculum and degree programs. The School's first international exchange program was introduced in 1959, when the faculty helped develop nursing schools in Korea. Subsequent projects provided nursing students with cross-cultural studies and global service opportunities in Australia, Costa Rica, and India, as well as Moi University in Kenya, the John F. Kennedy Medical Center in Liberia, and at Peking University and Sun Yat-sen University in China. During the same period, the IU nursing school also discontinued its three-year general nursing degree (the last of this type of diploma was issued in 1960) and replaced it with a four-year Bachelor of Science in Nursing degree that the National League for Nursing accredited in 1961. The School's curriculum also expanded to include offerings in public health nursing. Continuing education programs and a two-year associate degree were launched in the mid-1960s. Adult and pediatric nurse practitioner programs began in 1971. IU established the state's first clinical nurse specialist program and first doctor of nursing science degree (DNS) in Indiana in the mid-1970s.

The opening of the nursing school's new academic facilities in Indianapolis in the mid-1970s provided opportunities to introduce new instructional methods. The School became a pioneer in the early creation and use of closed-circuit television and video instruction. It was also an innovator in the use of digital technology and distance learning, including the development of online nursing courses and degree programs, as well as instructional videos. In addition, the School's faculty became leaders in the National Black Nurses Association, founders of the Midwest Nursing Research Society and the National Association of Clinical Nurse Specialists, and organizers of the National Association of Pediatric Nurse Practitioners. In 1922, six IU nursing students founded Sigma Theta Tau International, a global nursing society.

== Curriculum and enrollment ==
The present-day IU School of Nursing's curriculum provides professional training and a broad, foundational education that encourages high standards of scholarship and expert care of patients. As of 2017 its degree programs include a four-year Bachelor of Science in Nursing (BSN) degree, a Master of Science in Nursing (MSN) degree, and two doctoral degrees: Doctor of Nursing Practice (DNP) and Doctor of Philosophy in nursing (Ph.D.). The IU School of Nursing's two–year Associate of Science in Nursing (ASN) degree was phased out and moved to Ivy Tech Community College of Indiana. IU's final ASN degrees were conferred in 2004.

In 2017, U.S. News & World Report ranked the IU School of Nursing twenty-eighth for its master's degree program and twenty-third for its DNP degree among U.S. colleges and universities and ranked the IUPUI School of Nursing's online graduate program thirty-ninth. College Choice ranked the IUPUI's undergraduate nursing program twenty-third among U.S. colleges and universities.

A total of 329 graduate students were enrolled in graduate nursing programs at IUPUI for the 2017–18 academic year; an additional 108 students were enrolled in its online graduate nursing programs.

== Accreditation ==
In May 1941, the IU Training School for Nurses was on the first list of the National League of Nursing Education's accredited schools of nursing. In 1992, the League accredited the IU School of Nursing's degree programs on all eight of the IU campuses. More recently, the National League for Nursing has designated the IU School of Nursing in Indianapolis as a Center of Excellence in Nursing Education in two categories: Advance of Science of Nursing Education (2012–21) and Promote the Pedagogical Expertise of Faculty (2006–22).

The Commission on Collegiate Nursing Education has accredited the IU School of Nursing's BSN, MSN, and DNP programs. Indiana University – Purdue University Fort Wayne, IU East, IU Kokomo, IU Northwest, IU South Bend, IU Southeast, and IUPUI are members of the American Association of Colleges of Nursing.

== Facilities ==
The IU School of Nursing's main building is on the Indiana University Indianapolis campus, with nursing programs and clinical training offered at IU's regional campuses in Indiana and at IU Health hospitals. In 1966, the School began planning its new facility at IUPUI. Construction began on the $7 million, nearly 40,000-square-foot (3,700 m^{2}) building in 1970. It is located between Long Hospital and IU's Clinical Building, south of Riley Hospital, and is a part of the IU Health Medical Center complex. The School of Nursing building was dedicated in May 1974. A $600,000 grant from the National Institutes of Health and a $300,000 appropriation from the state legislature provided additional funding to construct a television studio in the building.

In 2006, the IU School of Nursing established the Center for Research in Nursing Education in Indianapolis. In 2008, it opened the Jean Johnson Schaefer Resource Center for Innovation in Clinical Nursing Education, a 15,000-square-foot (1,400 m^{2}) training facility at IU Indianapolis.

== Research ==
The School's research projects over several decades have established its "national reputation as a center of excellence for scholars of nursing education." In 1976 Robert Wood Johnson Foundation's Nursing Faculty Fellowship Program in Primary Care chose the IU School of Nursing as one of four training sites in the U.S. "to provide extended primary health care nursing skills training, curriculum development, physician collaboration, and clinical research." Since that time the nursing school has developed and implemented primary care programs around Indiana, including maternity and prenatal care programs, community health care projects, rural family health care, geriatric care, and health care programs for immigrants. For more than twenty years the School has received funding for research from the National Institute for Nursing Research at the National Institutes of Health. NIH-funded projects began in 1999 with the nursing school's Center for Enhancing Quality of Life in Chronic Illness (CEQL), one of nine core research centers in the country at that time. Its other NIH-funded project include the Behavioral Cooperative Oncology Group of the Mary Margaret Walther Program for Cancer Research and the Center for Research in Nursing Education.

A School-hosted research conference in 1977 resulted in the establishment of the Midwest Nursing Research Society. More recently, the School's research initiatives have included Research in Palliative and End-of-Life Communication and Training (RESPECT) that was established in 2013.

== Notable faculty and alumni ==
=== Directors and deans ===
- Alice Fitzgerald, first director of the IU Training School for Nurses and superintendent of nurses (1914–15)
- Ethel Palmer Clarke (1915–31)
- Josephine Hall, acting director (1931–33)
- Cordelia Heflin (1933–46)
- Mary Lydia Peacock (1946–48)
- Jean Coffey (1949–53)
- Crystal Halstead (1953–56)
- Martha Akers (1956–57)
- Emily Holmquist, first dean of the IU School of Nursing (1957–73), first executive director of the American Association of Colleges of Nursing, and a past president of the Indiana State Nurses Association.
- Elizabeth "Betty" Grossman (1973–88)
- Constance Baker (1988–91)
- Angela Barron McBride (1991–2003); former senior vice president for academic affairs at the IU Medical Center and Clarian Health (now IU Health); the first nurse named as an IU distinguished professor; and first woman from Indiana elected to the Institute of Medicine.
- Sharon Farley, interim dean (2003–04)
- Marion Broome (2004–14)
- Robin Newhouse (2015–25)
- Janet S. Carpenter, named dean of the IU School of Nursing in 2025.

=== Faculty and alumni ===
- Joan Austin, IU School of Nursing professor and researcher; in 1981, the first graduate to earn a DSN from IU; the first nurse to serve as president of the American Epilepsy Society; a member of the Institute of Medicine.
- Michael Beebe, a graduate of the School's doctoral program in 1982, later served as dean of the Point Loma College's School of Nursing in San Bernardino County, California.
- Lauranne Sams, IU School of Nursing's first African American faculty member; founding member of the National Black Nurses Association.
- Laurie Gunter, IU School of Nursing's former director of research; secured the School's first federal research grant from the U.S. Department of Health and Human Services, Division of Nursing.
- Anne Mitchem-Davis, the first African American graduate of the IU School of Nursing (1953); the recipient of an IU School of Nursing, Distinguished Alumni Award (2005); and a former Assistant Dean, College of Nursing, at Howard University in Washington, D.C.

== Awards ==
- In 2013, Sigma Theta Tau International awarded its Practice-Academic Innovative Collaboration Award to the IU Nurse Leadership Partnership with IU Health.
