= Ball Nurses' Sunken Garden and Convalescent Park =

Historic park and garden in Indiana, United States

- U.S. National Register of Historic Places
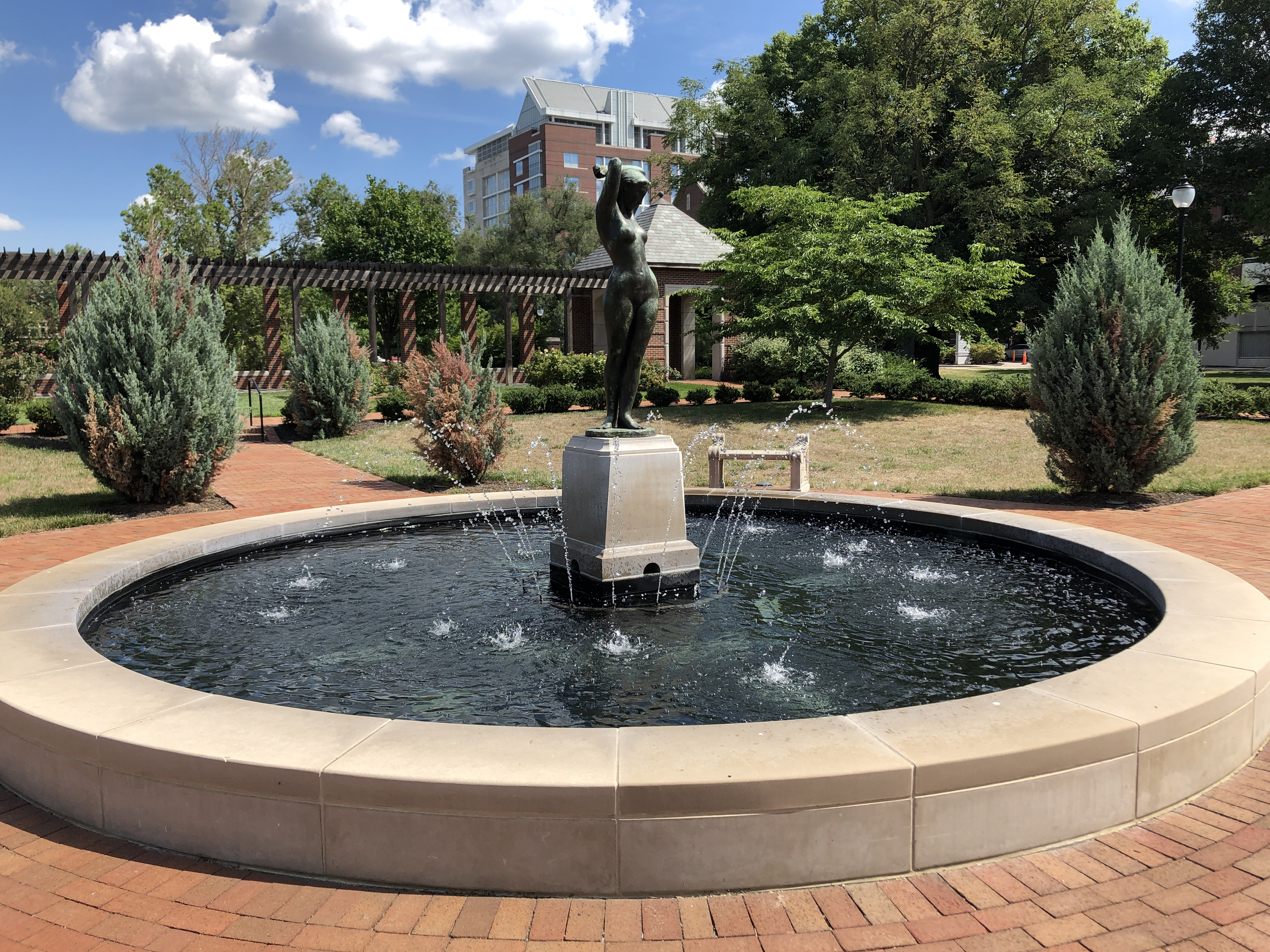
- Ball Nurses' Sunken Garden and Convalescent Park in 2022

- Location within Indianapolis Location within Indiana Location within the United States
- Location: Indiana University Indianapolis; Indianapolis, Indiana, U.S.
- Coordinates: 39°46′35″N 86°10′56″W
- Area: less than one acre
- Built: 1930-1940
- Architect: Gallagher, Percival; Olmsted Brothers
- NRHP reference No.: 96001008
- Added to NRHP: September 25, 1996

Ball Nurses' Sunken Garden and Convalescent Park is a historic park and garden on the campus of Indiana University Indianapolis in Indianapolis, Indiana, United States.

It was designed between 1929 and 1934 by Percival Gallagher, principal landscape architect for the Olmsted Brothers. The Ball Nurses' Sunken Garden and Convalescent Park were constructed between 1930 and 1940. It was listed on the National Register of Historic Places in 1996.

== History ==
Following the construction of the James Whitcomb Riley Children's Hospital in 1921, the Riley Memorial Association convinced the City of Indianapolis to purchase property east of site for a convalescent park. The Riley Memorial Association first discussed buying the land for a convalescent park with the City of Indianapolis as early 1921.

The garden was designed by Percival Gallagher, architect for the Olmsted Brothers, between 1929 and 1934 as a therapeutic greenspace for convalescence care. George A. Ball donated $10,000 to help improve the landscape around the Ball Residence for Nurses. This garden is the only remaining public garden designed by the Olmsted Brothers in Indianapolis and the only Olmsted Brothers therapeutic greenhouse on an urban medical campus in the United States. In 1947, the Nurses’ Alumnae Association donated the Robert Davidson sculpture known as Eve, which would become the centerpiece of the central pool.

Ball Garden was listed on the National Register for Historic Places in 1996 for its embodiment of masterful landscape architecture. In 2016, the Ball Garden were rededicated by Indiana University President Michael McRobbie, Chancellor Nasser Paydar, and the Indiana University School of Nursing Dean Robin Newhouse. The garden lies in between the Rotary Building to the north, the Ball Residence Hall and Ball Annex to the south.

== See also ==
- Indiana University–Purdue University Indianapolis Public Art Collection
- National Register of Historic Places listings in Center Township, Marion County, Indiana
