= Susan Moore =

Susan Moore may refer to:

== Fictional characters ==
- Susan Moore, fictional character in Ted Bundy (film)
- Susan Moore, fictional character in Every Night at Eight
- Susan Moore (General Hospital), a character on the American TV series General Hospital

== Other uses ==
- Susan Moore (physician), African American doctor who died from COVID-19
- Susan Moore, Alabama, a city in the United States
- Susan Waters (1823–1900), née Moore, American artist

== See also ==
- Sue Moore (disambiguation)
- Suzanne Moore (born 1958), English journalist
- Susanne Vandegrift Moore (1848–1926), American editor and publisher
