= Indiana University Health People Mover =

People mover in Indianapolis, Indiana, US (2003–2019)

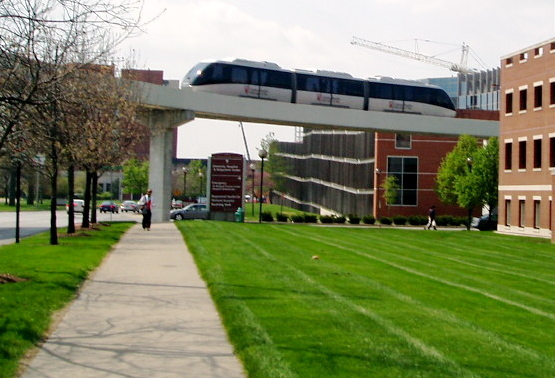
- People mover in 2007

Overview
- Locale: Indianapolis, Indiana, United States
- Transit type: People mover
- Number of lines: 1
- Number of stations: 3

Operation
- Began operation: 2003
- Ended operation: 2019
- Operator: Indiana University Health
- Number of vehicles: 2 × (3 car)

Technical
- System length: 1.4 mi (2.25 km)
- Track gauge: 4 ft (1,219 mm) duorail concrete guideway
- Average speed: 17 mph (27 km/h)
- Top speed: 30 mph (48 km/h)

The Indiana University Health People Mover, formerly the Clarian Health People Mover, was a 1.4-mile (2.3 km) long, 4 ft (1,219 mm) narrow gauge people mover in the city of Indianapolis in the United States. The system opened on June 28, 2003, to connect Methodist Hospital of Indianapolis, Indiana University Hospital, and James Whitcomb Riley Hospital for Children, jointly operated as a single hospital by Indiana University Health.

The dual-track system was open to the public and operated around the clock, taking 5 minutes in each direction. During the daytime, a train departed automatically every six minutes. It was notable for being the only private transportation system in the United States constructed to run above public streets.

The People Mover ended operations in February 2019. The passenger service was replaced by shuttle buses, which are significantly less expensive to operate. The infrastructure of the People Mover remains in place, supporting pneumatic tubes and fiber optic cables.

== History ==
In 1997, the three hospital operations were combined under Indiana law creating a shared staff of over 10,000 employees who could be required to travel between the campuses. Commuting between the three sites was complicated and required crossing under Interstate 65 by shuttle buses.

In May 2000, a Health Care Transportation System Franchise Agreement was signed, followed by the People Mover – State of Indiana Airspace Agreement and Lease in November 2000 to allow crossing under the Interstate 65 highway for a period of 25 years. The system was ready by late 2002, which was followed by a six-month testing period, during which the trains were driven manually. After the public opening in June 2003, automatic and remote operation from the control center was used.

As of February 2017, the People Mover had made 500,000 round trips (1.04 million miles) and carried 6.1 million passengers, operating at 99.6-percent efficiency.

IU Health announced the closure of the People Mover in December 2018, to be replaced by shuttle buses. The People Mover was due for major maintenance, estimated to cost $20 million. The switch to buses is estimated to save $1.5 million per year in operating costs. The People Mover carried its last passengers on Wednesday, February 6, 2019.

Since the end of passenger service, portions of the track have been removed. In September 2023, part of the structure collapsed during demolition, killing a construction worker.

== Technology ==
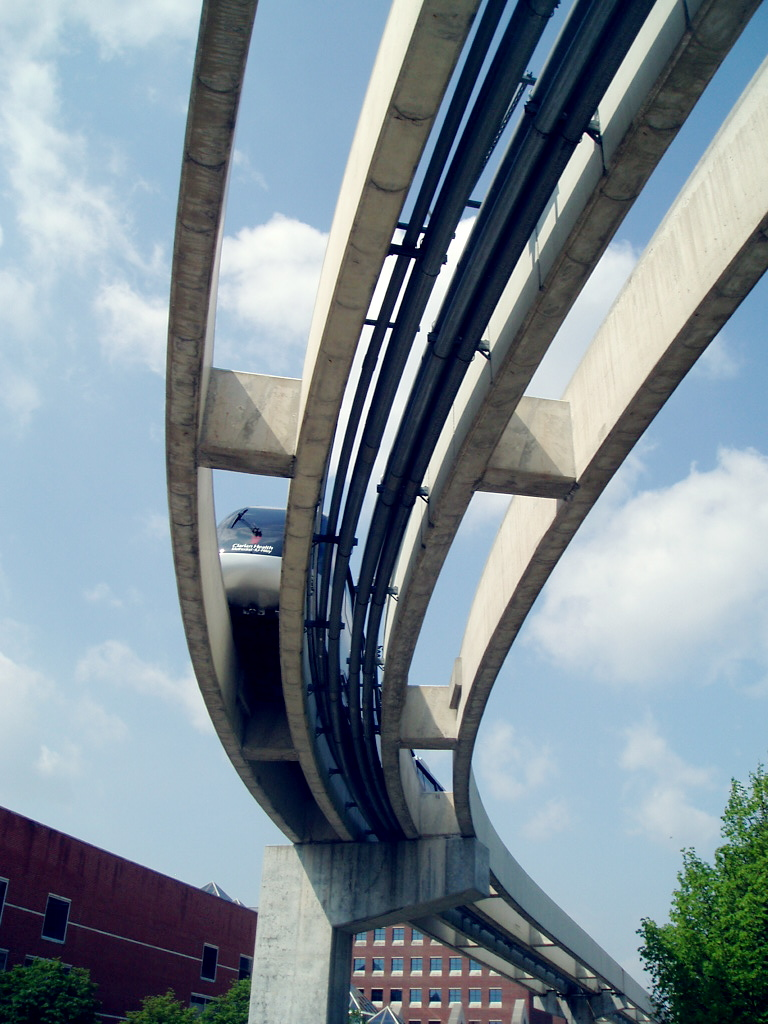
The large gap between the rails avoids collecting snow. In the center are pneumatic tubes for document and sample transfer.

The system was constructed by Schwager Davis Inc. (SDI) from San Jose, California, to their Unitrak standard.

There are two separate parallel elevated guideways side-by-side, both of which operate in both directions. Each guideway uses two concrete rails, with an open space between. This technology is similar to a monorail, but technically distinct.

Each of the two tracks carried a train with three carriages for a total capacity of 81 passengers. Each train weighed 45,000 pounds (20 t) and had twenty-four passenger seats across the three cars. The rest of the passenger capacity was made up of standing places.

== Operation ==
During daytime, trains departed every six minutes.

During the night-time, one track was closed between 6:00 pm and 5:30 am for maintenance, with the other train/track operated in on-demand mode by elevator-style call buttons.
