= Indiana University Neuroscience Research Building =

Medical research facility in Indianapolis, Indiana, US

Neuroscience Research Building

General information
- Location: 320 W 15th St., Indianapolis, IN 46202-2266
- Coordinates: 39°47′17.008″N 86°9′49.366″W
- Groundbreaking: 2012
- Completed: 2014
- Affiliation: Indiana University-Purdue University Indianapolis and Indiana University Health

Design and construction
- Architecture firm: BSA LifeStructures
- Structural engineer: TRC WorldWide Engineering
- Other designers: HKS Maregatti Interiors
- Main contractor: Messer Construction

The Indiana University Neuroscience Research Building is a medical research facility located on the Indiana University Health academic health campus in downtown Indianapolis and connected to the Goodman Hall Neuroscience Center. The building houses neuroscience research institutes, including the Institute of Psychiatric Research (IPR), from the Indiana University School of Medicine and IU Health.

== History ==
=== Institute of Psychiatric Research ===
Beginning in 1953, Dr. Margaret Morgan, Indiana state commissioner of mental health, convinced Governor George N. Craig to support the construction of an Institute of Psychiatric Research located in Indianapolis. The construction would be funded using private donations and $1 million from the state. The four-story Institute of Psychiatric Research (IPR) building was completed in 1956 by the State of Indiana to house the IU Department of Psychiatry. The IPR building officially opened on December 13, 1956, with a Board of Directors, led by the first Director John Nurnberger Sr. The goal of the institute was to research the physical causes of psychiatric disorders, such as schizophrenia, mood and anxiety disorders, autism, dementia, and addiction.

Since its founding, the IPR has led several research projects on neurological and psychiatric illnesses. In the 1960s, IPR researchers discovered that glycine was a neurotransmitter. In the 1970s, IPR faculty published research contributing to the understanding of serotonin and how it relates to behavior. In the 1980s, the IPR led a study on psychiatric genetics and how they may lead to depression or addiction. IPR researchers led a second research study on the biological nature neurological disorders, specifically arguing that individuals may be born with a predisposition to certain disorders. In the 1990s, IPR faculty developed a model for examining panic disorder and linked certain neurological disorders directly to panic attacks and anxiety.

The IPR building had an addition added sometime in the early 2000s that led to various new facilities. These facilities included a new tissue culture room and molecular genetic laboratories on the third floor. Other facilities that existed at this time included the animal surgery sweet on the fourth floor and an electronic and instrument repair facility in the basement.

The Psychiatric Building was one of the IUPUI properties included in the 2008 land swap between Indiana University and Wishard Memorial Hospital.

In 2014, the Institute of Psychiatric Research building was demolished to make way for the construction of Eskenazi Hospital.

=== Move to the Academic Health Campus ===
In the fall of 2012, IU President Michael McRobie broke ground for a new neuroscience research building. The building was intended to house the Institute of Psychiatric Research and the Stark Neurosciences Research Institute in a central location.

The Neuroscience Research Building designed by BSA LifeStructures and construction began in August 2012, costing $52 million. The new building was built on the academic health campus located near Indiana University Health Methodist Hospital and was developed jointly between the Indiana University School of Medicine (IUSM) and Indiana University Health. The building opened to the public in December 2014.

The building provides laboratory research spaces and facilities to interdisciplinary research teams of the School of Medicine, the Stark Neurosciences Research Institute, and the Institute of Psychiatric Research.

== Architecture ==
The exterior of the Neuroscience Research Building features an efficient design, composed of glass. The building's interior is flexible, adaptable to changes, and has abundant natural light. The channel glass walls create a translucent tower at the main staircase. The building follows a theme consistent with the entire neuroscience campus. The channel glass's 60% recycled content contributed greatly to the sustainability of the project and its LEED Gold certification achievement.

== See also ==
- Indiana University–Purdue University Indianapolis Public Art Collection
