= Ball Residence Hall =

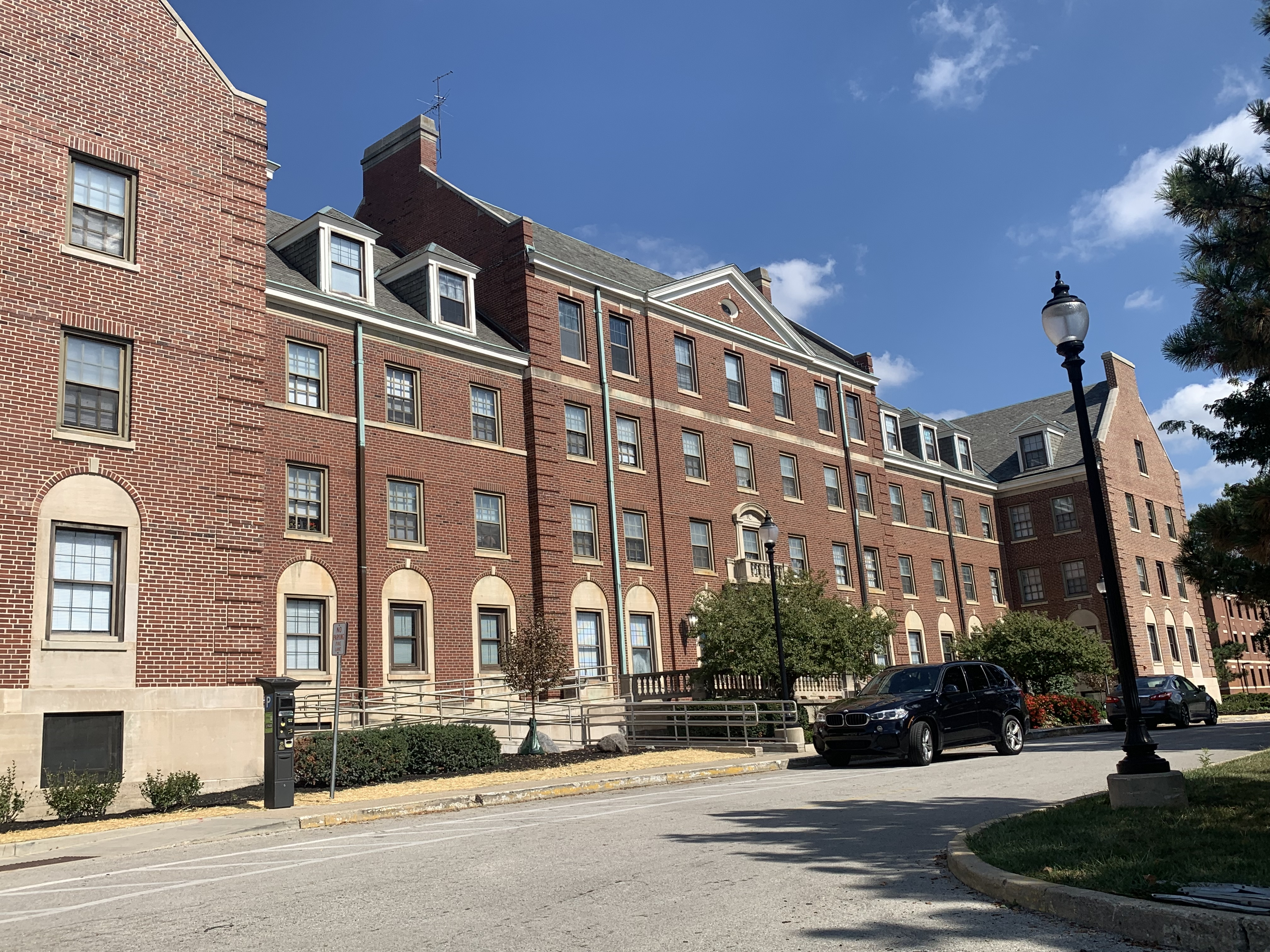
- Former names: Ball Nurses' Residence

General information
- Architectural style: Georgian Revival
- Address: 1226 W Michigan St, Indianapolis, IN 46202
- Coordinates: 39°46′30.972″N 86°10′55.434″W
- Completed: 1928
- Affiliation: Indiana University-Purdue University Indianapolis

Design and construction
- Architect(s): Robert Frost Daggett

The Ball Residence Hall, originally known as the Ball Nurses' Residence and Ball Nurses' home, is located at 1226 W Michigan St, Indianapolis, Indiana, and was constructed in 1928. The Hall is a four-story Georgian Revival style building constructed out of Indiana limestone and red brick. The building served as an extension of the Indiana University School of Medicine for the training of student nurses but has transitioned to a first-year student residence hall. The Hall is on the west site of the Indiana University Indianapolis campus adjacent to the Ball Nurses' Sunken Gardens and across from the Rotary Building.

== History ==
The Ball Residence Hall was constructed in 1928 and designed by Robert Frost Daggett with an English Georgian style aesthetic. Originally known as the Ball Residence for Nurses’ and the Riley Home for Nurses, it served as a dormitory for student nurses studying at the Indiana University School of Medicine. The building was funded by IU Trustee George A. Ball. Ball donated $500,000 and the new building was named after the Ball family. The building housed 165 nurses and had space for classrooms and offices. The new Ball Residence replaced several cottages on campus that were used by students and staff.

In 1934, under Willis Dew Gatch, Dean of the Indiana University School of Medicine, Ball Hall was repaired as part of a campus-wide project to improve healthcare-related facilities. Ball Residence Hall was repaired to create a better environment for nurses working in local healthcare facilities, both on and off the Indiana University Medical Center campus. By 1941, increased demand for nursing education led to the Ball Residence used to growing class sizes. Following the Japanese Attack on Pearl Harbor, Indiana University suffered a decline in student nurses and shortage of medical supplies. Indiana University implemented a yearlong nursing program and waived preparatory requirements for student nurses. Coupled with the passage of the Nurse Training Act, also known as the Bolton Act, student nurses at Indiana University increased significantly leading to Ball Residence Hall becoming overpopulated. In March 1943, Sister Elizabeth Kenny visited Riley Children's Hospital and Ball Residence Hall, where a reception was thrown in her honor. In 1945, Ball Residence added another 80-bed wing to address the growing population of student nurses in Indianapolis. In 1953, the university constructed the Student Union Building north of the residence hall to provide books, food, and amenities for medical students on campus.

In the 1970s, Ball Residence held part of the Indiana University School of Public and Environmental Affairs until the construction of the new Business/SPEA Building in 1981. In 1974, the Nursing School moved to the new School of Nursing Building and vacated the Ball Residence Hall. In 1988, the Ball Residence added an expanded game room with ping pong tables and a small library. In the late 1990s, the IUPUI Writing Center opened a satellite center in the Ball Residence Hall to assist students with their writing skills. In 1992, the Ball Residence fire alarm system was updated, and the roof was remodeled as part of a campus-wide initiative to improve the quality of student residential life.

In 2021, Ball Residence Hall was renovated by arcDesign to replace the mechanical, electrical, plumbing, and fire protection systems; remodel current restrooms; add universally accessible student rooms and single-use restrooms; add a new laundry room; update student rooms and access controls; and make improvements to the south entry exterior.

== Ball Annex ==
An addition known as the Ball Annex was constructed in 1945 by McQuire and Shook Architects as an extension of Ball Residence Hall. Ball Annex matched the red-brick English Georgian style of Ball Residence Hall. In 1957, two floors were added to accommodate the growing number of nursing students in Indianapolis. The 3,000 volume School of Nursing Library was housed in the Ball Annex. The library moved to the Medical Science Building following its completion in 1959. In 2003, the Ball Annex was renovated by CSO Architects Engineers & Interiors, Inc. for the IUPUI Police Dispatch Center. In August 2023, the IUPUI Police Department moved from the Ball Annex to the Ott Building.

== See also ==
- Indiana University–Purdue University Indianapolis Public Art Collection
