= Susan J. Pressler =

Professor of nursing

Academic background
- Education: BSN, Indiana State University; MSN, PhD, Indiana University

Academic work
- Institutions: Indiana University School of Nursing; University of Michigan

Susan J. Pressler is an American cardiovascular researcher and nurse. She is the Susan Rearhard Endowed Chair in Nursing and director of the Center for Enhancing Quality of Life in Chronic Illness at the Indiana University School of Nursing.

== Early life and education ==
Pressler earned her Bachelor of Science in Nursing degree from Indiana State University and her MSN and PhD from Indiana University.

== Career ==
Upon completing her PhD, Pressler joined the faculty at the University of Michigan and served as chairperson of the American Heart Association Council on Cardiovascular and Stroke Nursing. In 2011, Pressler was appointed the associate dean of graduate studies where she would oversee Michigan's new Doctorate in Nursing Program. She also served as the principal investigator of a randomized pilot study to test a computerized cognitive training intervention program in patients with heart failure. The following year, Pressler was named a Distinguished Visiting Research Fellow at Australian Catholic University.

Pressler eventually left the University of Michigan and accepted a position as the Sally Rearhard Endowed Chair at Indiana University–Purdue University Indianapolis. At the Indiana University School of Nursing, she also directed the Center for Enhancing Quality of Life in Chronic Illness. In this role, she was the recipient of the National Institutes of Health $2.5 million grant to research whether computerized cognitive training exercises can improve memory and quality of life for heart failure patients. Pressler was also the co-recipient of another research grant to study new ways to prevent and manage serious chronic health conditions.
