= Indiana University Dance Marathon =

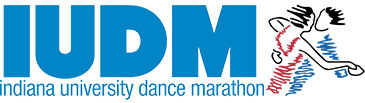
- Abbreviation: IUDM
- Formation: 1991
- Purpose: Philanthropy
- Location: Bloomington, IN, USA
- President: Matt McCormick (2025)
- Affiliations: Riley Hospital for Children; Children's Miracle Network
- Volunteers: 4,000+
- Website: http://www.iudm.org/

The Indiana University Dance Marathon, commonly known as IU Dance Marathon or IUDM, is a 36-hour dance marathon that takes place every November at Indiana University in Bloomington, Indiana, United States with the purpose of raising both funding and awareness for pediatric care. In 1991, student Jill Stewart started IU Dance Marathon in honor of her friend, Ryan White, who died from AIDS the year before. Since then, IUDM has raised over $50 million for Riley Hospital for Children in Indianapolis, IN, including most recently $3,135,391.23 during the 2025 marathon. The 2026 Indiana University Dance Marathon will take place November 6–8.

== History ==
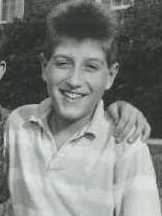
Ryan White

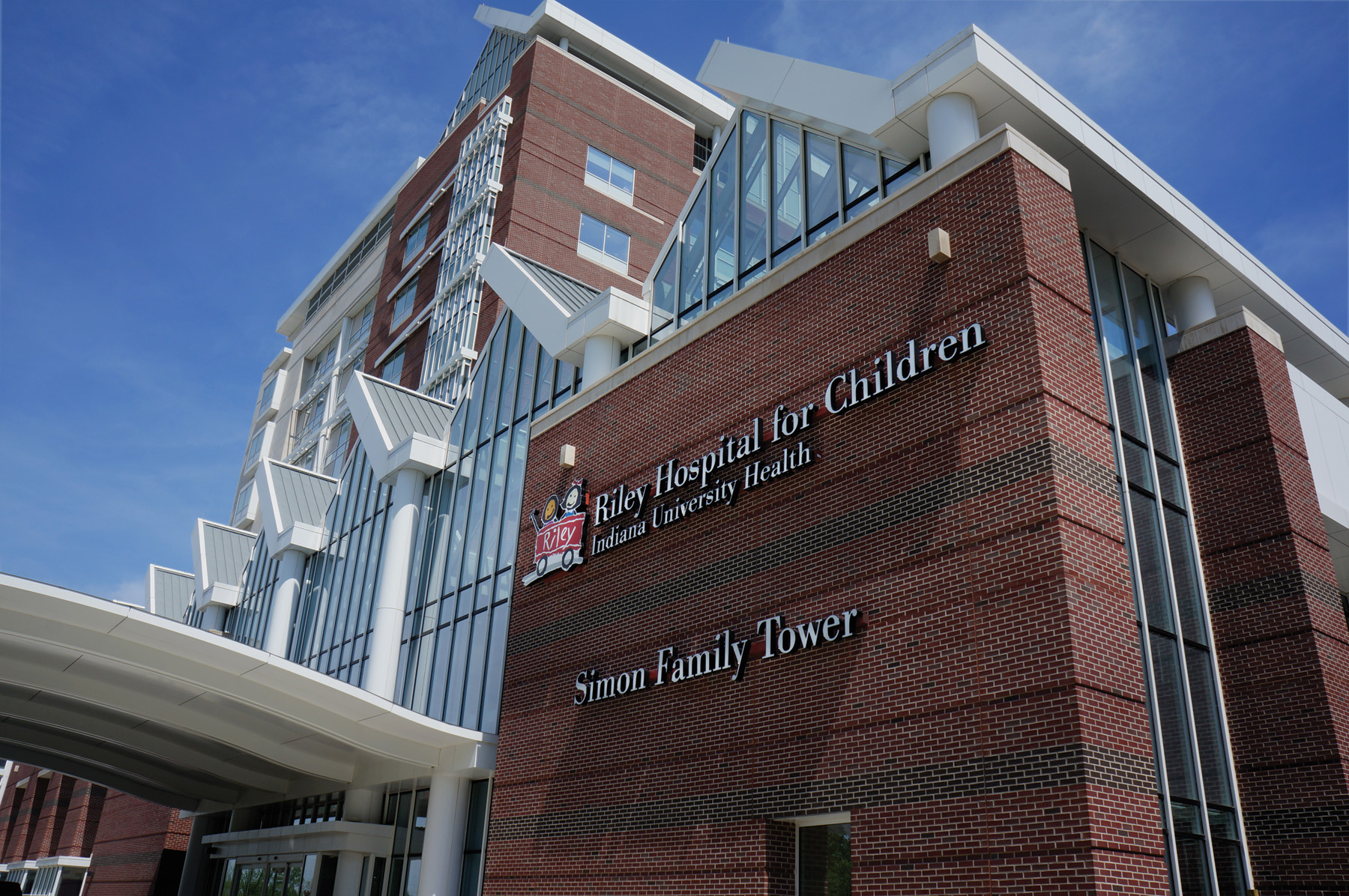
Riley Hospital for Children in Indianapolis, IN

=== Ryan White ===
Ryan White's 1990 death was the inspiration for the creation of the Indiana University Dance Marathon in 1991. Thirteen-year-old Ryan White contracted AIDS from contaminated blood transfusions he received for hemophilia. When news of the contraction of AIDS became public, his school district in Kokomo, Indiana banned him from attending classes. Ryan then went on to fight in court which led to many headlines across the country and national celebrities like Michael Jackson and Elton John advocated on his behalf. Michael Jackson and Elton John befriended Ryan and helped to spread his story and awareness of AIDS.

After arduous court battles, Ryan won the right to return to school; but his battle with the community and AIDS had just begun. The White family dealt with adversity on a daily basis. People were not willing to deal with the concept of AIDS and shunned the Whites. They were victims of fear and anger but had an optimistic outlook that eventually things would return to normal. It was not until a bullet was shot into the White home that the family moved to Cicero, Indiana, where they found peace.

Ryan White was one of the biggest advocates of AIDS awareness, appearing at schools and fundraisers across the nation and testified in front of the President's Commission on HIV Epidemic in hopes of changing the public's perception of the disease.

On April 8, 1990, Ryan White died at the age of 18, right before he was to attend Indiana University. His strength and acceptance of disease helped those battling common illnesses continue to fight. Ryan's life is commemorated by the annual Dance Marathon funds and the Ryan White Infectious Disease Center at Riley Hospital.

=== Ashley Louise Crouse ===
On Tuesday, April 12, 2005, the Indiana University campus suffered a loss with the death of one of its students, Ashley Louise Crouse. Ashley was the Vice President of Communications for IUDM and a member of Kappa Kappa Gamma sorority. On her way home from an executive meeting, Ashley was struck and killed by a drunk driver outside the sorority house in which she lived, leaving behind a legacy of hope and passion that continues to live within each person involved in the organization.

Born and raised in Carmel, Indiana, Ashley's hometown joined with IUDM to create the most successful high school dance marathon in the country. In addition, along with Ryan White, the two are remembered by the thousands of IU students each year during a walk of remembrance each spring.

=== Riley Hospital for Children ===
Riley Hospital for Children, the recipient of the proceeds of the dance marathon, is a nationally ranked pediatric hospital located on the Indiana University School of Medicine's campus in Indianapolis, Indiana. It is one of the largest hospitals in the United States and treats over 80 percent of Hoosier children cancer patients. It continues to be among the best in the nation for its innovative research and unparalleled care. For the third year in a row, Riley Hospital has been ranked nationally in all 10 categories by U.S. News & World Report and remains the only nationally ranked children's hospital in the state of Indiana.

The donations support Riley Hospital's mission to not turn away any child regardless of their family's financial status. It has more care-beds than any other children's hospital and treats over 150,000 patients a year. Riley Hospital for children has Indiana's only American Burn Association (ABA)-verified pediatric burn center and provides Indiana's only comprehensive outpatient evaluation and treatment services for children with kidney failure. It welcomes every type of patient and continues to enhance its cutting-edge care and facilities.

IUDM funded the Ryan White Infectious Disease Center which is housed in the Simon Family Tower, a 10-story, 675,000 sq. ft. inpatient center which opened on January 27, 2011. The infectious disease center is led by the Director and Professor of Clinical Pediatrics, Dr. John C. Christenson, MD, along with the Associate Professor of Clinical Pediatrics, Dr. Elaine G. Cox, MD. Ryan White's doctor, Dr. Martin B. Kleiman, MD, continues to practice under infectious disease as the Ryan White Professor of Pediatrics.

== Current events ==
IUDM Through the Years
Year	Amount	Quotes
1991	$10,900.00	"Celebrate life. Dance. Hope."
1992	$23,000.00	"JAM!"
1993	$66,234.46	"Do it for the children."
1994	$96,343.33	"Together we will raise more in '94."
1995	$140,072.46	"Keep the dream alive in '95."
1996	$152,760.00	"Making miracles."
1997	$206,537.20	"Big hearts helping little hands."
1998	$230,565.20	"Living with hope, dancing for smiles."
1999	$315,060.16	"Sharing smiles, living dreams."
2000	$402,324.17	"A decade of chance, a lifetime of hope."
2001	$405,412.17	"Dancing for miracles, reaching for dreams."
2002	$415,412.19	"Believing in the gift of tomorrow."
2003	$403,000.19	"The chance of a lifetime to give a lifetime of chance."
2004	$468,600.19	"A chance of a lifetime to give a lifetime of chance."
2005	$677,415.19	"If you can dream it, you can do it."
2006	$920,386.20	"We dance because we can. We stand for those who can't."
2007	$1,041,197.20	"Inspired by a cure. Touched by a story. Changed for a lifetime."
2008	$1,376,550.23	"Have the heart to dream big and the passion to live bigger."
2009	$1,520,418.21	"Encourage hope. Celebrate life. Dare to dream big."
2010	$1,602,713.20	"Inspired by our past to dance for their future."
2011	$1,801,207.20	"Out of difficulties grow miracles."
2012	$2,125,322.20	"Where there is love, there is life."
2013	$2,622,123.21	"Live for today. Dance for tomorrow."
2014	$3,206,340.22	"Build Tomorrow's Dreams"
2015	$3,880,025.22	"Bringing Legacy to Life"
2016	$4,152,440.23	"United by Passion, Powered by Hope."
2017	$4,203,326.23	"Founded in Family"
2018	$4,187,051.23	"Together We Will"
2019	$4,257,143.23	"Every Moment Matters"
2020	$2,905,188.23	"Built by Legacy, Uniting for Purpose"
2021	$3,090,215.23	"Against Odds, We Rise"
2022	$3,233,968.23	"Rooted in Tradition, Transforming Tomorrow"
2023	$3,003,837.23	"Be the Difference"
2024	$3,058,042.23	"Move With Purpose"
2025	$3,135,391.23	"Why Not Now?"
Total	$59,336,522.46	Total raised since 1991

== Archived events ==
FT5K

The IUDM FT5K is a 5K run/walk that occurs the spring before the marathon and is located across from the Indiana University football stadium. Participation is open public-wide and prizes are awarded to the top three finishers. Following the race, entertainment and food are provided, as well as, time to spend with the Riley kids. IUDM Gives Back

IUDM Gives Back is an effort in which dance marathon committee members have the opportunity to give back to the Bloomington community through volunteer work. Committee members volunteer for various establishments including the Monroe County Community Kitchen, Boys & Girls Clubs of America, the Bloomington Community Orchard, and the WonderLab Museum of Science, Health & Technology.

Riley at the Rock

Each year, IUDM partners with Indiana University Athletics to host a pre-game tailgate featuring food, music, and games during which Riley children (over 60 in 2013) and their families spend time with IUDM participants. Following these pre-game festivities, the families and IUDM students enjoy the unique opportunity of running across the field immediately before the start of the game. Riley at the Rock provides an opportunity for the students to interact with children that have inspired them to participate in IUDM outside of the marathon.

Fore the Kids Golf Outing

The IUDM Golf Outing is the main summer event and takes place at the River Glen Golf Club in Fishers, IN. Last year, the annual outing raised a record $31,000, surpassing 2012's total of $28,000. Individuals are encouraged to create teams to participate in the tournament in addition to a lunch and silent auction. To kick off the tournament, Riley patients and families are invited to share their story and encourage the golfers during their competition.

Runway Riley

Runway Riley is an annual fashion show co-sponsored by IU Dance Marathon and Phi Mu sorority. Not only does the event showcase the year's newest line of IUDM apparel for the first time to the public, but Riley kids and their families are featured as models of the clothing and merchandise. Immediately after the show, all apparel is available for purchase. Since its introduction in September 2012, Runway Riley has raised almost $30,000 for the kids at Riley Hospital for Children. The Riley kids get to feel like superstars in front of hundreds of cheering attendees.

A Walk to Remember

Each year, around the anniversary of both Ryan White and Ashley Louise Crouse's deaths, hundreds of students gather to walk in memory of the pairs passing. The walk starts at the Kappa Kappa Gamma house, where Crouse was a member, and continues around campus until ending up back at the Kappa house.

== Marathon weekend ==
IUDM 2013 Line Dance

IUDM 2013

IUDM 2013 Total

The marathon takes place at the Indiana University Tennis Center, located on campus just north of Assembly Hall and Memorial Stadium, from Friday to Sunday one weekend in November. Those volunteering, or dancing, stand for 12, 24, or 36 hours in honor of those who cannot.

Before the event, all dancers participate in Color Wars fall semester long competition between 8 color teams that compete during the months leading up to the marathon and throughout the duration of the 36 hour dance marathon event. Dancer organizations are randomly divided into color teams and work together to earn points for their color by participating in weekly competitions, fundraising, 3 large-scale events, marathon stage games, and marathon participation. The winner of color wars for the year is announced at the marathon just before the raising of the total.

Committee members come together to set up, run the event and inspire others for the duration of the weekend. The marathon starts at 8 PM Friday night with dancers running into the gym to the song, "Eye of the Tiger." The executive council is then introduced and the dancers get to witness the famous IUDM Linedance for the first time. After the opening ceremonies, the teams are split up in a variety of stations around the center, including stations geared toward learning the linedance, hospitality and sports activities.

At certain times all teams and committee members come together to hear artist and speakers perform, participate in activities on stage and listen to Riley stories.

== Organization structure ==
President - Mena Morcos
Vice Presidents (4)
Communications - Tessa Hoffman	Finance - Brian Coles	Internal - Allie McKeown	Membership - Markie Lance
Committee Directors (18)
Hospital Relations - Nora Doyle	Accounting - Tamir Halevi	Entertainment - Caleb Harvey	Alumni Relations - Reagan Wilson
Marketing - Ben Rykard	Corporate Relations - Sophia Becker	Hospitality - Sophia Russell	Dancer Relations - Hannah Layne
Public Relations - Marty Blader	Fundraising - Greta Kollbaum	Logistics - Hannah Brown	Marathon Relations - Corben Lashley
Special Events - Emma Bender	Merchandise and Apparel - Carly Miles	Morale - Jimmy Dapp	Recruitment - Trevor Roseboom
		Riley Development - Sydney Morlok	Stewardship - Mary Bowman
Committee Chairpersons
Committee Members
Dancers

President - Matt McCormick
Vice Presidents (4)
Communications - Olivia Stone	Finance - Shane Newton	Internal - Gabriella Schuetz	Membership - Elizabeth Rexing
Committee Directors (18)
Hospital Relations - Maddie Jeffers	Accounting - Oscar Choi	Entertainment - Alyssa Brachetti	Alumni Relations - Tessa Hoffman
Marketing - Peyton Meier	Corporate Relations - Maddie Retherford	Hospitality - Jake Keller	Dancer Relations - Joe Sawyer
Public Relations - Ella Self	Fundraising - Sabina Alcock	Logistics - Erika England	Marathon Relations - Morgan Davis
Special Events - Georgia Trisler	Merchandise and Apparel - Kenzie Wilson	Morale - Mena Morcos	Recruitment - Markie Lance
		Riley Development - Connor Whaley	Stewardship - Claire Wisler
Committee Chairpersons
Committee Members
Dancers

== Past Executive Councils ==
2024 President - Evelyn Underhill
Vice Presidents (4)
Communications - Meredith Waymire	Finance - Sophie Miller	Internal - Emma Bastin	Membership - Seth Schuck
Committee Directors (18)
Hospital Relations - Ella Konow	Accounting - Amy Kinney	Entertainment - Macy Coers	Alumni Relations - Jordan Strachan
Marketing - Lilah Speca	Corporate Relations - Maddie Miklovic	Hospitality - Abi Hays Wilson	Dancer Relations - Lindsey Dann
Public Relations - Jillian Bernstein	Fundraising - Shane Newton	Logistics - Izzy Larco	Marathon Relations - Hailey Fox
Special Events - Emma Cannon	Merchandise and Apparel - Georgia Rice	Morale - Antonio Ferran	Recruitment - Gabriella Schuetz
		Riley Development - Elise LaSell	Stewardship - Matt McCormick
Committee Chairpersons
Committee Members
Dancers

2023 President - Anna Gummere
Vice Presidents (4)
Communications - Maggie Doyle	Finance - Kelsey Osborne	Internal - Anna Emmert	Membership - Sara Alexander
Committee Directors (18)
Hospital Relations - Ciarra Beisler	Accounting - Emma Bastin	Entertainment - Camden Stuart	Alumni Relations - Katrina Scheidler
Marketing - Elise Fossum	Corporate Relations - Colin Wright	Hospitality - Bella Rios	Dancer Relations - Will Browning
Public Relations - Meredith Waymire	Fundraising - Alli Waller	Logistics - Mia Contino	Marathon Relations - Kendall Henderson
Special Events - Claire Horan	Merchandise and Apparel - Zoe Schwertfager	Morale - Evelyn Underhill	Recruitment - Lindsey Sibell
		Riley Development - Kennedy Kanouse	Stewardship - Emily Stasiak
Committee Chairpersons
Committee Members
Dancers

2022 President - Ali Klein
Vice Presidents (4)
Communications - Kendall Wilkes	Finance - Isaiah Cox	Internal - Luke Montgomery	Membership - Hunter Mills
Committee Directors (18)
Hospital Relations - Alex Brown	Accounting - Kelsey Osborne	Entertainment - Ava Staph	Alumni Relations - Lauren Campbell
Marketing - Jonathan Burris	Corporate Relations - Anna Gummere	Hospitality - Ally Coleman	Dancer Relations - Nate Shatkowski
Public Relations - Maggie Doyle	Fundraising - Piper Schuring	Logistics - Bella Rios	Marathon Relations - Destinee Clayton
Special Events - Kara Rice	Merchandising and Apparel - Jess Larson	Morale - Reagan Carr	Recruitment - Anna Emmert
		Riley Development - Sophia Sciaudone	Stewardship -Sara Alexander
Committee Chairpersons
Committee Members
Dancers

2021 President - Cath McGibbon
Vice Presidents (4)
Communications - Grace Ybarra	Finance - Paige Smith	Internal - Pat McPartlin	Membership - Courtney Carlson
Committee Directors (18)
Hospital Relations - Jonathan Walts	Accounting - Isaiah Cox	Entertainment - Tom Werner	Alumni Relations - Sofia Balcius
Marketing - Jack Hochstetler	Corporate Relations - Sarah Smith	Hospitality - Emma Crumback	Dancer Relations - Max Henden
Public Relations - Alex Sevening	Fundraising - Peri Ehudin	Logistics - Annie Hoodecheck	Marathon Relations - Claire Rosenthall
Special Events - Janie Voris	Merchandising and Apparel - Maggie Campbell	Morale - Macoy Riley	Recruitment - Taylor Mosser
		Riley Development - Kelsey Hemmings	Stewardship - Ali Klein
Committee Chairpersons
Committee Members
Dancers

== See also ==
- Riley Hospital for Children
- Riley Children's Foundation
- Children's Miracle Network
- Ryan White
- Indiana University - Bloomington
- Dance Marathon
- Dance in the United States
