= IU Rotary Building =

Building in Indianapolis, Indiana

Rotary Building
- Interactive map of the Rotary Building area
- Former names: Indiana Rotary Convalescent Home

General information
- Architectural style: Tudor Revival
- Location: 702 Rotary Circle, Indianapolis, Indiana
- Coordinates: 39°46′40″N 86°10′56″W
- Completed: 1932
- Affiliation: Indiana University-Purdue University Indianapolis

Design and construction
- Architect: Robert Frost Daggett

The IU Rotary Building, originally known as the Indiana Rotary Convalescent Home, is located at 702 Rotary Circle, Indianapolis, in the US state of Indiana, and was constructed in 1932. The Rotary Building is a two-story Tudor Revival style building with 28,300 square feet (2,630 m^{2}). The building has a moderate-pitched side-gabled roof with square-like wings on both sides of the main body. The walls are built with red brick in Flemish bonding style, and there is limestone detailing surrounding the windows and above the main entrance. The limestone above the main entrance has decorative limestone with the words “Rotary” and “Convalescent” etched into it. The first floor of the façade has nine flattened Tudor arches. Above the main entrance, there is a roof terrace that overlooks the adjacent Ball Gardens and Convalescent Park and Ball Residence Hall to the south. The roof is covered with light grey asphalt shingles. The Rotary Building is located on the west side of the Indiana University Indianapolis campus.

== History ==
=== Convalescence care ===
Despite the harshening economic conditions during the Great Depression, local healthcare institutions were able to expand and recruit larger staff due to localized philanthropy efforts. The success of local philanthropy efforts by social clubs indicated how serious the public understood growing public health concerns. Large scale outbreaks such as Spanish Flu and polio led to a growing need for a greater health care system and long-term recovery services. Polio was a disease that was especially prevalent amongst children and would result in long-term recovery and physical rehabilitation. The rising demand for space to allow for long-term recovery created by seasonal polio outbreaks led to industry-wide innovations in terms of health care and recovery methods. The demand for more hospital space for long-term recovery, especially for pediatric patients, led to the creation of the Rotary Building.

The Rotary Clubs in Indiana funded the creation of the Indiana Rotary Convalescent Home to create space for patients of Riley Children's Hospital to receive long-term recovery care with space to live and receive education, leading to its construction in 1932. The building was an important expansion for Riley as it funded by charity organizations during the height of the Great Depression in the United States, but also assisted with rising cases of seasonal polio amongst children in the Indianapolis area.

Long-term recovery care was the primary function of the Rotary Building up until around 1952. This included hosting Sunday school and other educational programs to help prevent children from falling too far behind in their education. In the early 1950s, the building underwent a large renovation to become an extension of Riley Children Hospital by adding an X-Ray department, cerebral palsy clinic, and audiology outpatient clinic. This reflects the drastic decrease in polio following the creation of the Salk polio vaccine. The Speedway Flyer reported that this was one of the oldest known clinics specializing in cerebral palsy in Indiana and potentially the United States. By 1951, advances in medicine and treatment led to a decline in the number of patients that needed long-term convalescence. Innovations in antibiotics and vaccinations led to a decline in the type of convalescence care that the Rotary Building provided. This led to the need to adapt the building to the current uses of Riley Hospital and trends in pediatric healthcare.

=== Academic center ===
The Rotary Building transitioned to being an academic institution over the next two decades and hosted multiple centers for medical education, most notably the Marilyn and Eugene Glick Eye Center. Beginning in 1982, the Rotary Building transitioned to being an educational institution part of the Indiana University School of Medicine, hosting the IU School of Medicine's ophthalmology department. From 1982 to 2011, the Rotary Building continued to host educational programs and research related to ophthalmology. The Marilyn and Eugene Glick Eye Center would occupy the Rotary Building from 1982 to 2011. In 2014, the Rotary Building would be renovated to expose the original terrace and rehabilitate the interior with modern amenities to meet current educational needs. As of 2023, the Rotary Building hosts the Center for Global Health, Office of Medical Education, and divisions of pulmonology, gastroenterology, and hepatology.

== See also ==
- Indiana University–Purdue University Indianapolis Public Art Collection
