= Indiana University Health Proton Therapy Center =

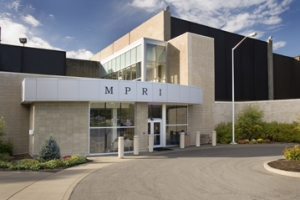
- IU Health Proton Therapy Center

- Located in Bloomington, Indiana

Geography
- Location: Bloomington, Indiana, United States
- Coordinates: 39°11′24″N 86°31′22″W

Organization
- Care system: Public
- Type: Specialist
- Affiliated university: Indiana University

Services
- Specialty: Oncology

History
- Founded: 2004
- Closed: 2014

Links
- Website: http://iuhealthproton.org
- Lists: Hospitals in Indiana

The Indiana University Health Proton Therapy Center, formerly known as the Midwest Proton Radiotherapy Institute (MPRI), was the first proton facility in the Midwest. The center was located on the Indiana University campus in Bloomington, Indiana, United States. The IU Health Proton Therapy Center was the only proton therapy center in the U.S. to use a uniform-scanning beam for dose delivery, which decreases undesirable neutron dose to patients. The Center opened in 2004, and ceased operations in 2014.

== Affiliations ==
The center was affiliated with the Melvin and Bren Simon Cancer Center and Indiana University Health and was the only U.S. proton therapy center associated with a university-based proton therapy technology research group, IU Cyclotron Operations. The center's pediatric program was affiliated with Riley Hospital for Children.

== History ==
Proton therapy is not experimental and has been used in the United States since 1946. In 2014 there were only 12 centers in the U.S. that provided proton therapy. The scarcity of proton centers was due to the cost of the cyclotron that produces a proton beam. IU Health Proton Therapy Center was able to repurpose the cyclotron located at the Indiana University Cyclotron Facility (IUCF), adapting the purpose from a research facility into a proton therapy center.

The Indiana University Cyclotron Facility (IUCF). was a cyclotron located on the Indiana University campus in Bloomington, Indiana, United States. It accelerated protons to an energy of 200 MeV, as well as light ions: deuterium, ^{3}He ^{4}He, ^{6}Li and ^{7}Li. The beam could be polarized and was delivered to experimental halls. The facility was operated between 1976 and 2010. in 1985 the IUCF was upgraded to operate a cooled beam (Cooler storage ring) able to accelerate protons to 500 MeV. In 2004, the IUCF was repurposed for medical use and became the Indiana University Health Proton Therapy Center

The proton therapy center and the cyclotron closed operations on December 5, 2014. The decision was made due to a lack of revenue and debt incurred by the center, as well as advances in proton therapy around the country that "now make the equipment and methods at the proton therapy center out of date." The proton center was able to produce spot scanning beams in 2008 and gate to both lung and heart.

== Proton therapy ==
Radiation oncologists have been using proton therapy to treat cancer since the 1950s. Long recognized for their targeting capability, proton beams achieve greater precision than traditional X-rays, while exposing healthy tissue to less radiation. This allows physicians to deliver high doses of radiation even when tumors are close to sensitive organs and tissue. A proton therapy beam's powerful energy is focused directly on a patient's tumor. Once released, the energy stops – there is no exit dose and no additional radiation unlike X-ray beams and gamma knife rays.
