= Indiana University Health Arnett Hospital =

Hospital in Indiana USA, founded 2006

- Indiana University Health
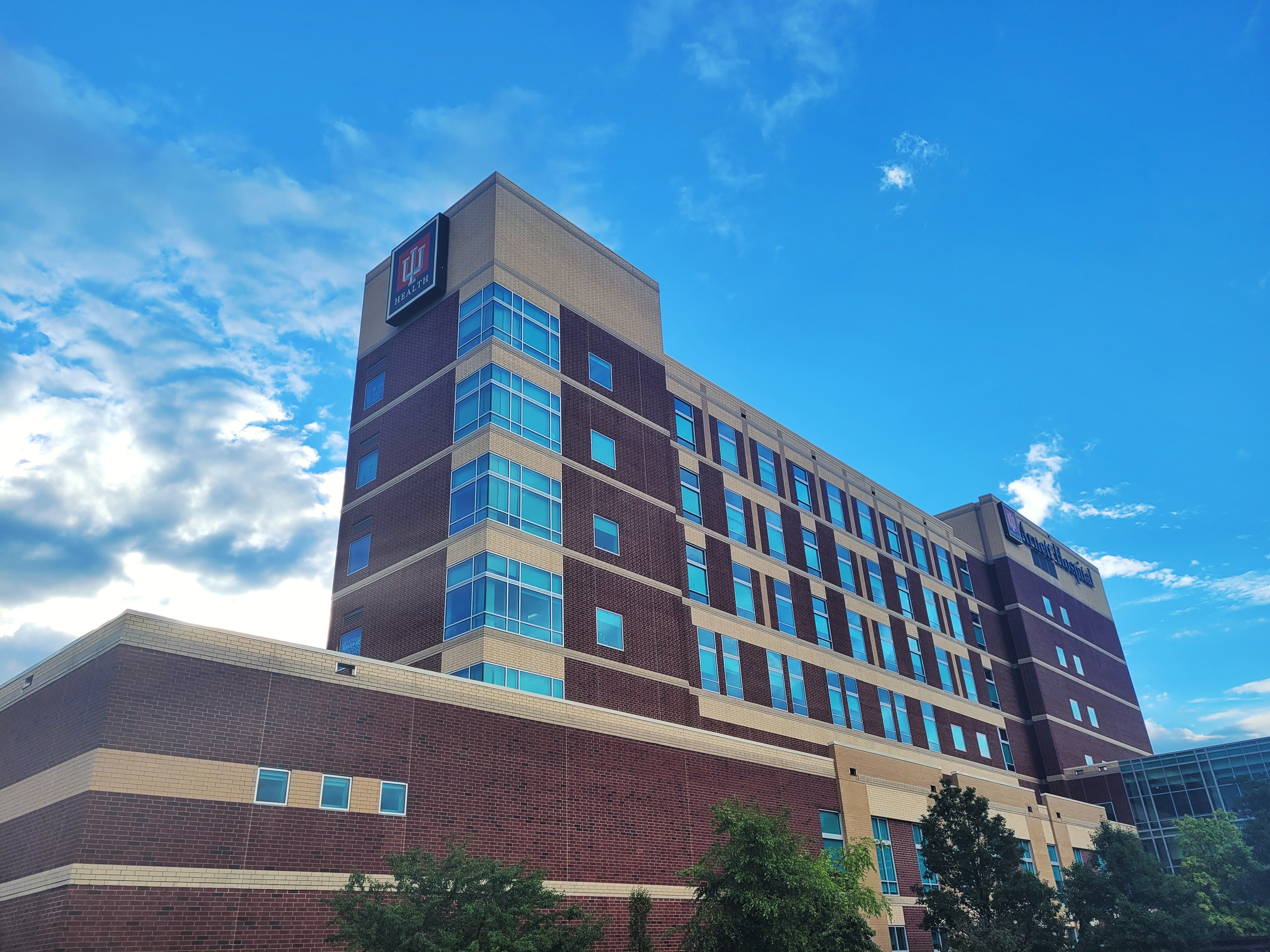

Geography
- Location: Lafayette, Indiana, United States
- Coordinates: 40°24′02″N 86°48′23″W

Organization
- Type: Teaching
- Affiliated university: Indiana University School of Medicine

Services
- Emergency department: Level III trauma center
- Beds: 191

Helipads
- Helipad: Yes

History
- Founded: 2006

Links
- Website: iuhealth.org/arnett
- Lists: Hospitals in Indiana

Indiana University Health Arnett Hospital is a full-service, private, nonprofit hospital located in Lafayette, Indiana. It is part of the Indiana University Health system. The hospital was the first in Indiana with an American College of Surgeons-verified Level III Trauma Center. IU Health Arnett also has a level III neonatal intensive care unit with 12 beds staffed by four neonatologists and additional 24-hour coverage by neonatal nurse practitioners. As a teaching hospital, IU Health Arnett takes medical, nursing, allied health professions, and other healthcare-related students from the nearby Indiana University School of Medicine (IUSM), Purdue University College of Health and Human Sciences, and Ivy Tech Community College of Indiana campuses.

== History ==
The 350,000-square-foot acute care hospital officially broke ground in 2006. In October 2008 Clarian Arnett Hospital officially opened. Clarian Arnett Hospital formed from a joint venture between Clarian Health Partners and Arnett HealthSystem. In January 2011 Clarian Arnett Hospital changed its name to Indiana University Health Arnett Hospital to reflect Clarian's affiliation with Indiana University Hospital and the Indiana University School of Medicine. In February 2015 IU Health Arnett Hospital started an $18 million expansion to add 100 patient exam rooms, three stories, and 75,000-square-ft to the facility. This new facility included physicians' clinic offices, including OBGYN, orthopedics, and surgeons. The project was completed in 2016.

IU Health Arnett is named after Arett C. Arnett, a physician who established a Lafayette clinic in 1922. Arnett graduated from the School of Medicine of Purdue University in 1907, now a part of IUSM.

== Leadership ==
Daniel Neufelder became president of IU Health West Central Region in May, 2018 succeeding Donald Clayton M.D.

== Recognition ==
IU Health Arnett is rated high performing in adult colon cancer surgery and in adult heart failure. In June 2019 the National Committee for Quality Assurance (NCQA) announced that IU Health Arnett has been awarded NCQA Patient-Centered Medical Home (PCHM) recognition.
