= Sue Moore =

Sue Moore may refer to:

- Sue Moore (actress) in Tiny Troubles
- Sue Moore (scientist) marine mammal scientist
- Sue Moore, mayor of Singleton Council

== See also ==
- Susan Moore (disambiguation)
- Suzanne Moore, journalist
- Destiney Sue Moore, American reality television star, actress and model
- Susanne Vandegrift Moore (1848–1926), American editor and publisher
