= MPRI =

MPRI may refer to:

- Military Professional Resources Inc., a private military contractor.
- Midwest Proton Radiotherapy Institute, a proton therapy treatment center in Bloomington, Indiana.
- Master Parisien de Recherche en Informatique, a French master course in theoretical computer science
