= Eve (Davidson) =

1931 sculpture by Davidson

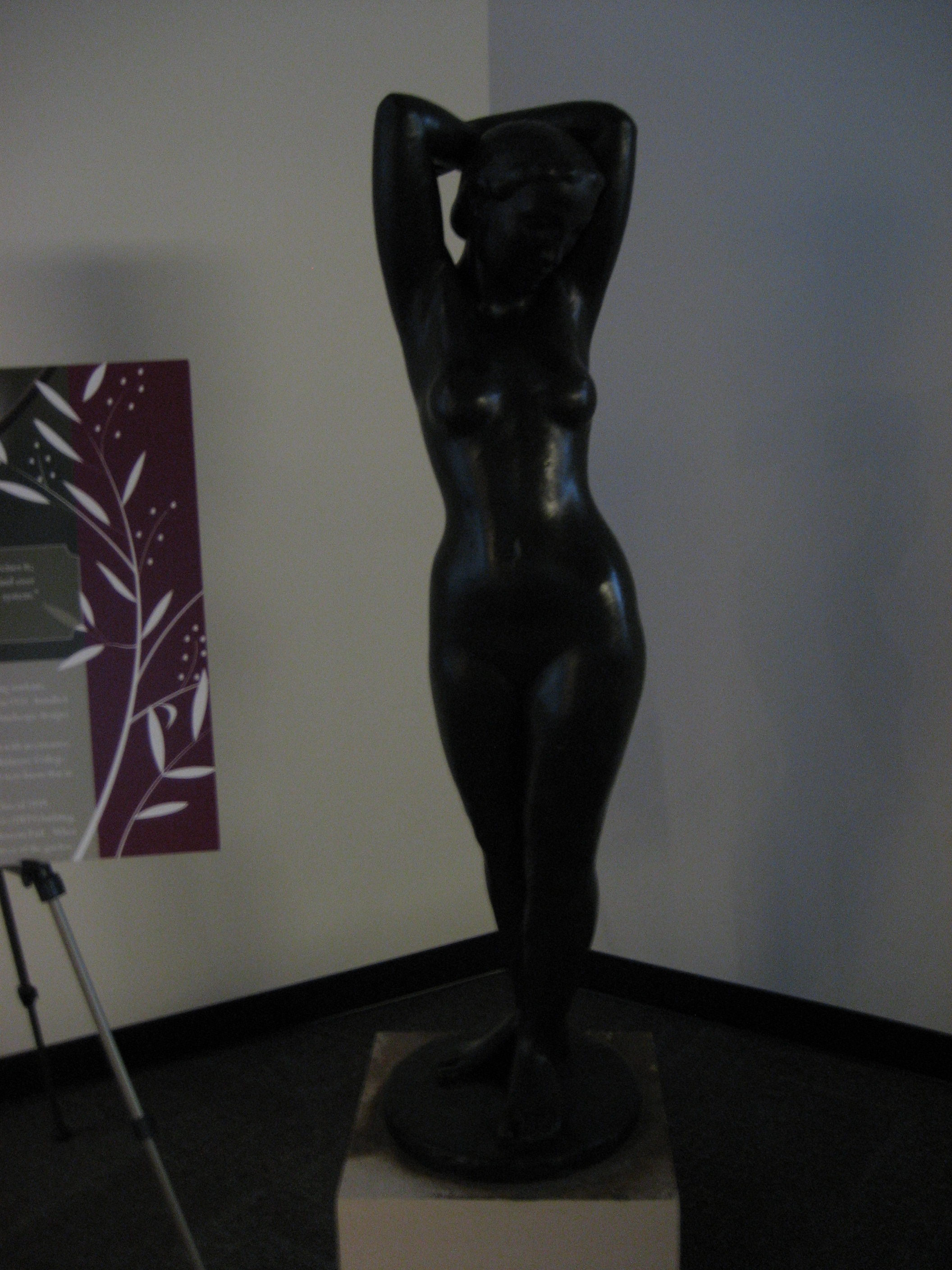
- Artist: Robert William Davidson
- Year: 1931
- Type: Bronze
- Dimensions: 150 cm × 30 cm × 61 cm (5 ft × 1 ft × 2 ft)
- Location: Indianapolis, Indiana, United States; 39°46.554′N 86°10.926′W
- Owner: Indiana University-Purdue University Indianapolis

Eve is an outdoor sculpture of the biblical Eve created by Robert William Davidson in 1931. It is currently located in a fountain at Ball Nurses' Sunken Garden and Convalescent Park on the campus of Indiana University-Purdue University Indianapolis (IUPUI). The overall dimensions of this bronze sculpture are 5’ tall, 2’ long, and 1’ wide.

== Description ==
Eve is a sculpture of a nude female figure standing on a circular bronze base which measures 17" in diameter and 2" tall. The figure is standing with her proper left foot pointed forward and her proper right foot is perpendicular to the left, pointing right. Her arms are crossed behind her head and she is looking down and to her left. Her hairstyle is such that all of her forehead and both of her ears are visible. “Robert Davidson" is visible on the proper left side of the top of the base.

== Information ==
The statue was nicknamed "Flo" for Florence Nightingale by the Indiana University School of Nursing students. The graduating class often posed around the statue for a photo in the 1940s. In the 1950s and 1960s, it became a tradition to dress the sculpture in a nurse's pink training uniform at graduation time. Eve has also been decorated with women's undergarments, towels, and balloons over time.

=== Acquisition ===
Eve was commissioned by the Indiana University Alumni Nurses Association in 1931. They wanted a statue to put in the newly created Ball Gardens just north of the nurses' Ball Residence. It was cast by the Priessmann, Breuer, and Co. Foundry in Munich, Germany.

== Artist ==
Robert William Davidson was born in Indianapolis, Indiana in 1904. He was an apprentice to his father, Oscar Davidson, also an artist. He studied sculpture at the John Herron Art Institute (now the Herron School of Art), the Art Institute of Chicago, the School of American Sculpture in New York City, and the Bavarian Fine Arts Academy in Munich, Germany.

Davidson's wife, Maryetta, was an Indiana ceramics artist and they both graduated from the John Herron Art Institute in 1926. They moved to Saratoga Springs, New York where Davidson taught art at Skidmore College from 1934 to 1972.

Davidson is a nationally known artist whose work is in the collections of the Indianapolis Museum of Art and the Smithsonian. He has won many awards for his works including the Art Association Prize at the Herron Art Institute in 1925, the Harry Johnson Prize from Hoosier Salon in 1930, and two first prize wins at the Indiana State Fair in 1923 and 1924. He died in Schenectady, New York in 1982.

== Location history ==
Eve was first shown at the 1933 Chicago World's Fair. It was then displayed at the Hoosier Salon in Chicago, and then in the John Herron School of Art. Eve was finally installed in the middle of a fountain at Ball Nurses' Sunken Garden and Convalescent Park by 1937. Over 60 years later, Eve was removed from the fountain and placed inside the University Library pending restoration by the Indianapolis Museum of Art's conservation staff. After conservation, Eve was housed in the HITS Building on the IUPUI campus with an accompanying interpretive sign stating, "Removed from the fountain in 1997 because of total ground instability. Temporarily placed here, in the Health Information and Translational Services Building, while awaiting rehabilitation of the Ball Nurse's Sunken Garden and Convalescent Park." In June 2016, Eve was returned the fountain as the centerpiece of the Ball Nurses' Sunken Garden after completing a restoration plan for the gardens prepared by the landscape architecture firm Rundell Ernstberger Associates.

== Documentation ==
A Museum Studies course at IUPUI recently undertook the project of researching and reporting on the condition of 40 outdoor sculptures on the university campus. Eve was included in this movement. This documentation was influenced by the successful Save Outdoor Sculpture! 1989 campaign organized by Heritage Preservation: The National Institute of Conservation partnered with the Smithsonian Institution, specifically the Smithsonian American Art Museum. Throughout the 1990s, over 7,000 volunteers nationwide have cataloged and assessed the condition of over 30,000 publicly accessible statues, monuments, and sculptures installed as outdoor public art across the United States.

== Gallery ==
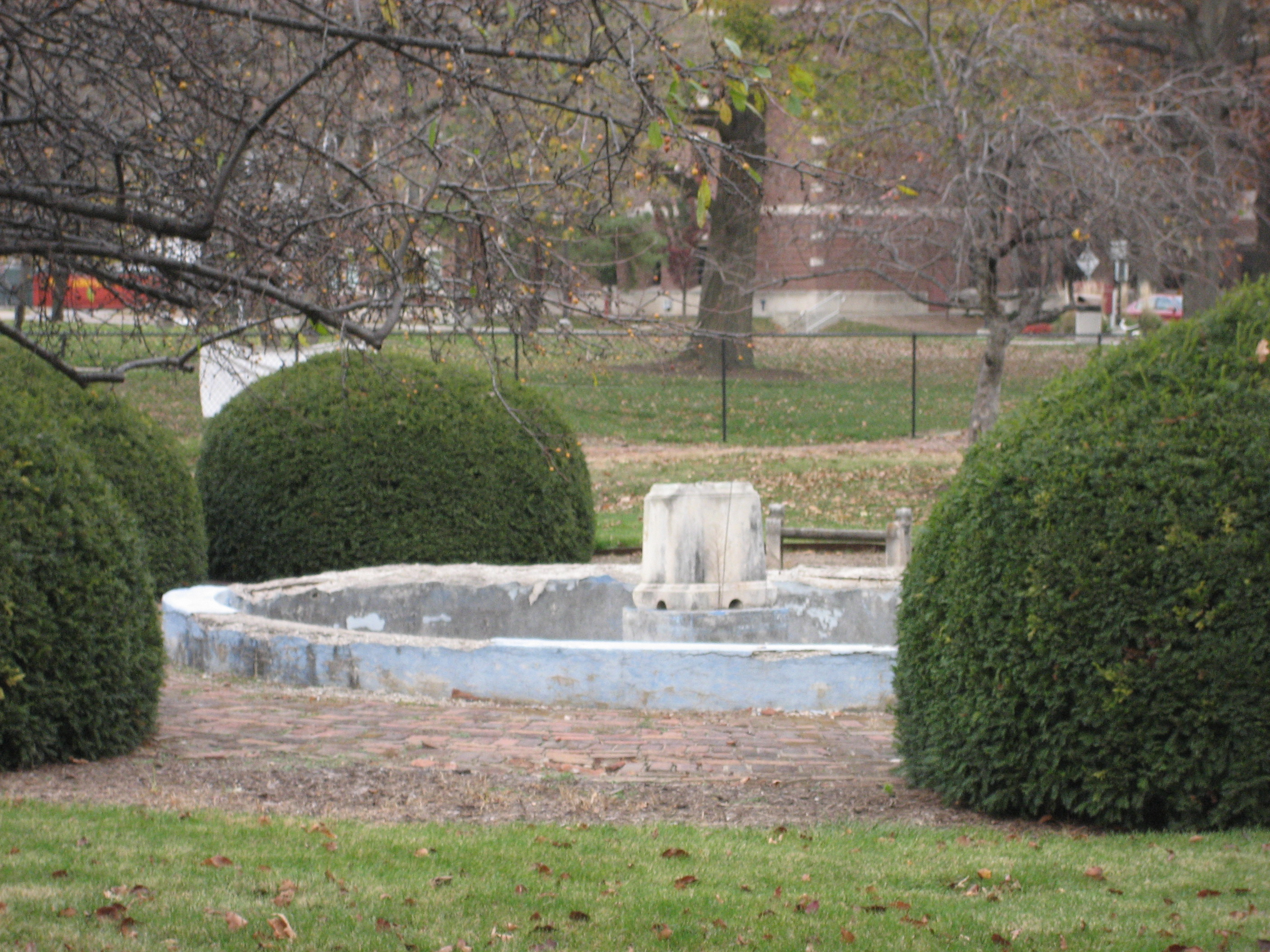
Permanent location of Eve in Ball Gardens

== See also ==
- 1931 in art
- List of public art at Indiana University – Purdue University Indianapolis
