= Jesse Quintana =

American musician (1928–2005)

Jesus “Jessie” Quintana Morales
- Also known as: “Jessie”
- Born: Tampico, Tamaulipas, Mexico
- Died: 2005-02-25 age 78 years

Jesus "Jesse" Quintana Morales (1928 – February 25, 2005) was a prominent musician and entertainer in Indianapolis. Born in Tampico, Tamaulipas, Mexico, Quintana became a beloved figure in the local community, known for his contributions to the city's cultural landscape as a troubadour and performer at various establishments and community events.

== Early life and immigration ==
Quintana was born in 1928 in Tampico, Tamaulipas, Mexico. At the young age of 16, he arrived in Texas in 1944 and briefly worked in Indianapolis in 1945 as a housing contractor. After returning to Texas, he met Maria Ochoa, whom he married on May 16, 1948, in Mercedes, Texas. In 1950, Quintana obtained work permits to stay in the United States and worked as a migrant laborer before relocating to Indianapolis in 1951 with his family.

== Life in Indianapolis ==
Upon settling in Indianapolis, Quintana worked for the Pennsylvania Railroad and later for the Wilbert Burial Vault Company. In November 1958, he became a naturalized U.S. citizen. Quintana lived on Davidson Street in an area known as "El Barrio," a vibrant community with a significant Hispanic population.

== Musical career ==
In the mid-1960s, Quintana pursued his passion for music, becoming one of the first Mexican musical performers in Indianapolis. He began performing at the Mexican Village at 22nd and Meridian Streets and Randy Galvin's Cabaret Theater in Talbot Village. Quintana's talent and charisma made him a fixture at various venues, including Embers Lounge, La Pas Mexican Restaurant, Pepe's, and Cancun Mexican Restaurant in Carmel.

His performances were not limited to scheduled gigs; Quintana was known to serenade individuals such as Joe Rangel at Acapulco Joe's, bringing a piece of Mexico to those who missed their homeland. One of his favorite venues was the Capri Lounge on North Keystone Avenue, where he performed alongside pianist Dave Lowe. Quintana's later years were spent performing at local schools and community events, sharing his love of music with a wider audience.

== Legacy and personal life ==
Throughout his life, Quintana was celebrated not only for his musical talent but also for his ability to bring people together through music and dance. He was a well-known dancer and enjoyed socializing at venues like the Speedway Moose Lodge. His impact was felt from coast to coast, with friends and family remembering him fondly.

Quintana died on February 25, 2005, at Methodist Hospital in Indianapolis, surrounded by his family. He is survived by his wife, Maria, their fourteen children, 24 grandchildren, and 16 great-grandchildren, with two more on the way at the time of his passing.

== Cultural impact and the legacy of El Barrio ==
Quintana's life and career were deeply intertwined with the cultural history of Indianapolis' Latino community. "El Barrio," where he resided, was a hub for Hispanic culture and social life, fostering a sense of belonging and community among its residents. Over time, infrastructure developments, such as the construction of I-65, led to the dispersion of this community. Despite the physical loss of El Barrio, the legacy of its residents, including Quintana, continues to influence the city's cultural tapestry.
