= Death of Susan Moore =

2020 COVID-19 death in Indiana, U.S.

On December 20, 2020, American physician Susan Grace Moore (born October 2, 1968) died in Carmel, Indiana, from complications related to COVID-19. In the weeks preceding her death, Moore, who was Black, had shared concerns that her symptoms were not being taken seriously by white medical professionals.

== Life ==
Susan Grace Moore was born in Jamaica on October 2, 1968. She had a degree in engineering from Kettering University in Flint, Michigan. She worked for 3M as an industrial engineer for almost ten years before returning to school. She was a 2002 graduate of the University of Michigan Medical School. Moore was a member of the Delta Sigma Theta sorority. Moore worked as a family physician in Carmel, Indiana. Her close family included her nineteen-year-old son, Henry Muhammed, and her elderly parents, both of whom she cared for at the time of her death, since they were living with dementia.

== Treatment for COVID-19 ==
=== Admission to Indiana University Health North Hospital ===
Moore tested positive for COVID-19 on November 29, 2020, and was admitted to IU Health North Hospital for care. On December 4, 2020, she shared a video to Facebook, in which she described how white doctors refused her pain medication, which she said "...made me feel like I was a drug addict". She also recalled begging for treatment with the anti-viral drug remdesivir, used to treat COVID-19 patients not on a ventilator, in addition to begging for a CT scan. She reported that a white doctor said, "You're not even short of breath", although she was at the time. In the video she stated that: "I put forth and maintain, if I was white, I wouldn't have to go through that .. This is how Black people get killed, when you send them home, and they don't know how to fight for themselves."

On December 7, 2020, Moore was discharged from IUHNH.

=== Admission to Ascension-St. Vincent Hospital ===
However just twelve hours later, she was re-admitted to hospital, this time to Ascension-St. Vincent Hospital. There she experienced improved medical treatment, according to her Facebook posts. Her final Facebook post read that she was being transferred to an intensive care unit. On December 10, 2020, she was intubated.

=== Death ===
Moore died at Ascension-St. Vincent Hospital in Carmel on December 20, 2020.

== Aftermath ==
Moore's death is viewed by some as an example of medical racism, where her race was a defining factor in how she was perceived and the treatment she was given.

In their statement after Moore's death the African American Policy Forum stated that "systemic forms of racism .. construct a reality wherein women like Dr. Moore can be stereotyped as an addict simply because they request the medication necessary to treat the excruciatingly painful side effects of a lethal disease. Here racism and sexism served to typecast Dr. Moore as someone who could be deemed unruly, intimidating, and untrustworthy at perhaps the most vulnerable moment of her life."

In the period of the COVID-19 pandemic when vaccinations began and the history of the Tuskegee Syphilis Study was frequently cited as the reason for vaccine hesitancy among Black Americans, Moore was invoked as a counter-example of present-day racism that poses obstacles to accessing health care and erodes trust in it.
