= IU Health North Medical Center =

Coordinates: 39.9594°N 86.1597°W

Indiana University Health North Hospital
- Indiana University Health
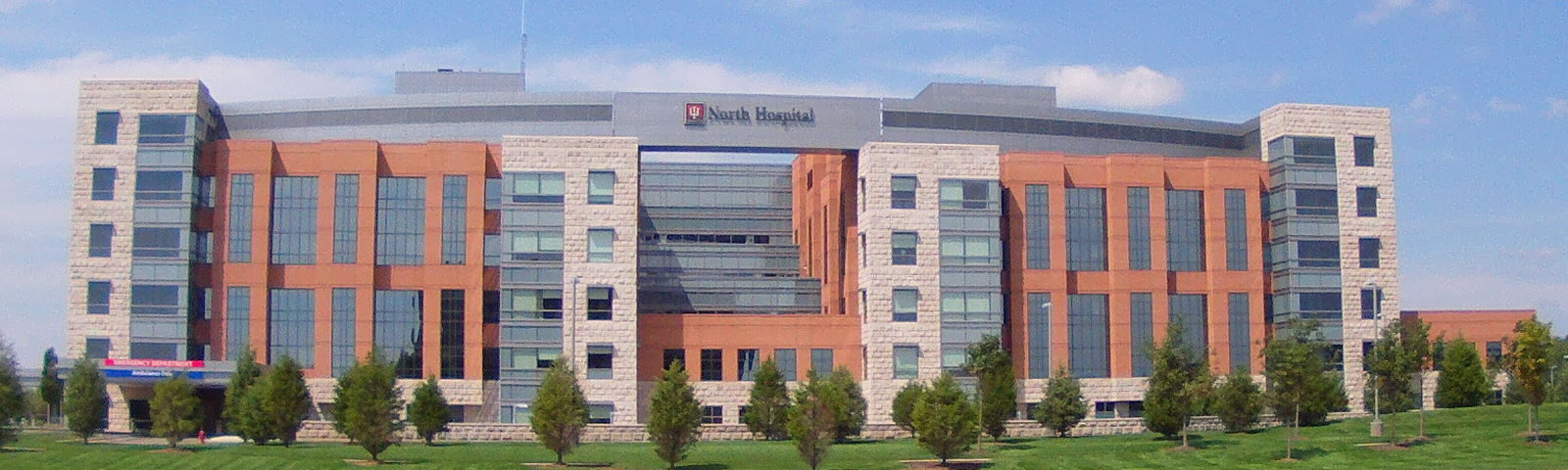

Geography
- Location: 11700 N. Meridian Street, Carmel, Indiana, United States

Organization
- Affiliated university: Indiana University School of Medicine

Links
- Website: www.iuhealth.org/north/
- Lists: Hospitals in Indiana

Indiana University Health North Hospital (originally named Clarian North Medical Center) is a full-service hospital for adults and children. Opened in December 2005, the 170-bed hospital and attached medical office building offer maternity, pediatric, and adult services. The pediatric inpatient services, imaging services, and emergency department are affiliated with IU Health Riley Hospital for Children and is called Riley North. Other programs affiliated with IU Health North include a Bariatric Center of Excellence, a nationally (NAPBC) accredited Breast Cancer Program, a cardiac program, a pediatric cancer program, and a range of pre-natal and parenting classes and programs.

IU Health North is located in Carmel, Indiana, just north of Indianapolis at 116th and Meridian Street. It is part of Indiana University Health, but has a separate board of managers, CEO, executive management team, physician investors, and community representation.

On August 23, 2018, ground was broken on the IU Health Joe and Shelly Schwarz Cancer Center. The addition will add 88,000 square feet (8,200 m^{2}) of space, as well as provide consolidated oncology services.
