= Indiana State Nurses Association =

U.S. professional organization

- Abbreviation: ISNA
- Founded: 1903
- Type: Nonprofit professional association
- Headquarters: Indianapolis, U.S.

The Indiana State Nurses Association was established in 1903 to advance the nursing profession in Indiana. Gertrude Fournier of Hope Hospital in Fort Wayne, Indiana, was elected the state organization's first president. The association formally incorporated in 1904. As part of its early efforts, the association worked to secure state legislation that required the registration of nurses. In 1907 the group lobbied for the establishment of a standard curriculum for nursing schools. The association also supported the introduction of a graduate program in nursing. Indiana University began the first graduate program in the state in 1932. In addition, the organization was active in the recruitment of nurses to serve in World War I and in World War II; opened a career counseling and placement service in 1946; and created a special committee to promote equality in the profession in 1953. The organization, which still exists, continues its advocacy of nurses and efforts to support the nursing profession in Indiana.
