= Riley Children's Foundation =

American nonprofit organization

The Riley Children's Foundation is a nonprofit organization established in 1921 as the Riley Memorial Association with the intentions of constructing a children's hospital. The Foundation's fundraising efforts have allowed for the hospital to flourish and for Indiana families to receive the benefits of free medical care.

== History ==
The Riley Memorial Association was founded in 1921 for Hoosier poet James Whitcomb Riley. The group's first project was to purchase Riley's Lockerbie neighborhood home, where the poet lived during the last 23 years of his life. After opening the home to the public, the group went on to build Riley Hospital for Children and open Camp Riley for Youth with Physical Disabilities. Riley Hospital opened its doors and received its first patient in 1924. Camp Riley has operated since 1955. The hospital, camp, and museum home are projects supported and sustained through the fundraising efforts of Riley Children's Foundation.

== Riley Hospital for Children ==
As the only comprehensive children's hospital in Indiana, Riley Hospital for Children has spent over 100 years caring for Indiana's children. Families turn to Riley Hospital and its regional clinics throughout the state for treatment more than 220,000 times each year.

Riley Hospital's Neonatal Intensive Care Unit (NICU) and pediatric pulmonary program are ranked among the top five in the nation. Riley's cancer, cardiovascular surgery and diabetes programs are also among the largest and best of their kind in the nation.

To sustain and expand groundbreaking and lifesaving pediatric research, facilities, medical treatment and accessibility, Riley Hospital relies on generous and broad-based financial support from Riley Children's Foundation.

== Camp Riley ==
Every summer, nearly 250 children, ages 8–18, from throughout Indiana and several other states come to Camp Riley. From horseback riding, to swimming, to conquering the high ropes course, campers discover new confidence and make lifelong friends. Camp Riley holds six different camp sessions during a five-week period each summer at Bradford Woods—Indiana University's 2,500-acre universally accessible outdoor recreational facility.

== James Whitcomb Riley Museum Home ==
The James Whitcomb Riley Museum Home is presented just as the great Hoosier poet James Whitcomb Riley experienced it for 23 years of his life. Authentic furnishings and décor include the poet's writing desk, a portrait of his beloved dog and his top hat and cane. The two-story brick James Whitcomb Riley Museum Home, nestled in Indianapolis’ historic Lockerbie neighborhood, was named a National Historic Landmark in 1962 and is open to the public.
