= Indiana University Health Methodist Hospital =

Hospital in Indianapolis, Indiana, US

Methodist Hospital
- Indiana University Health
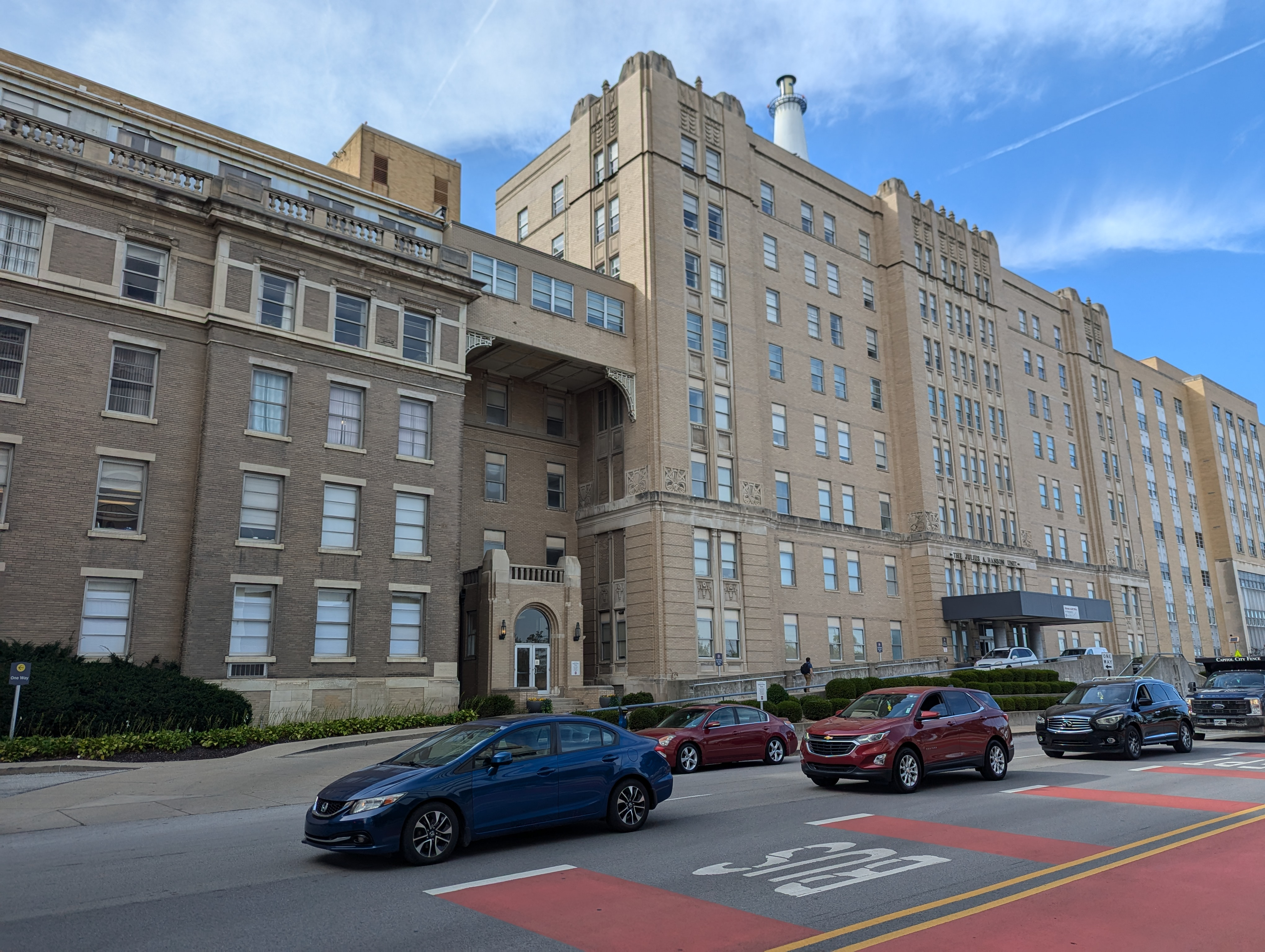
- IU Health Methodist Hospital from Capitol Avenue in 2024

Geography
- Location: 1701 N. Senate Blvd., Indianapolis, Indiana, United States
- Coordinates: 39°47′25″N 86°09′45″W

Organization
- Type: Teaching
- Affiliated university: Indiana University School of Medicine

Services
- Emergency department: Level I trauma center
- Beds: 802

Helipads
- Helipad: Yes

Links
- Website: http://www.iuhealth.org/methodist/
- Lists: Hospitals in Indiana

Indiana University Health Methodist Hospital is a hospital part of Indiana University Health, in Indianapolis, Indiana, United States. It is the largest hospital in the state of Indiana and one of only four regional Level I Trauma Centers in the state. It has 625 staffed beds and is one of the largest teaching hospitals in the area.

The hospital specializes in numerous treatment areas, including adult cardiovascular services provided in the new Clarian Cardiovascular Center. Methodist physicians and staff performed the first open-heart surgery in Indiana in 1965. The hospital system is also considered a neurosurgery center of excellence, as well as an expert in organ transplantation, urology, neurology, orthopedics and pediatrics. Indiana's first medical helicopter, the LifeLine helicopter ambulance, was based at Methodist and flew its first mission in 1979 from the hospital's helipad. The hospital also houses the Indiana Poison Center. In 2004, Clarian Health became Indiana's first magnet hospital system.

Indiana University Health operates the Methodist Hospital, Indiana University Hospital and Riley Hospital for Children, which were all connected by the Indiana University Health People Mover.

Methodist Hospital is the official hospital for the Indianapolis Motor Speedway: all drivers injured at the Indianapolis 500 and Brickyard 400 are transported there for treatment. As well, it is also the official hospital for the NHRA during the U.S. Nationals. In 2017, Sebastien Bourdais was hospitalized at Indiana University Health Methodist Hospital after an accident during qualifications for the 101st Running of the Indianapolis 500.

The hospital has been ranked in the top 50 hospitals in the United States for 10 consecutive years.

The former Vice President of the United States Dan Quayle was born at Methodist Hospital in 1947.

== Expansion ==
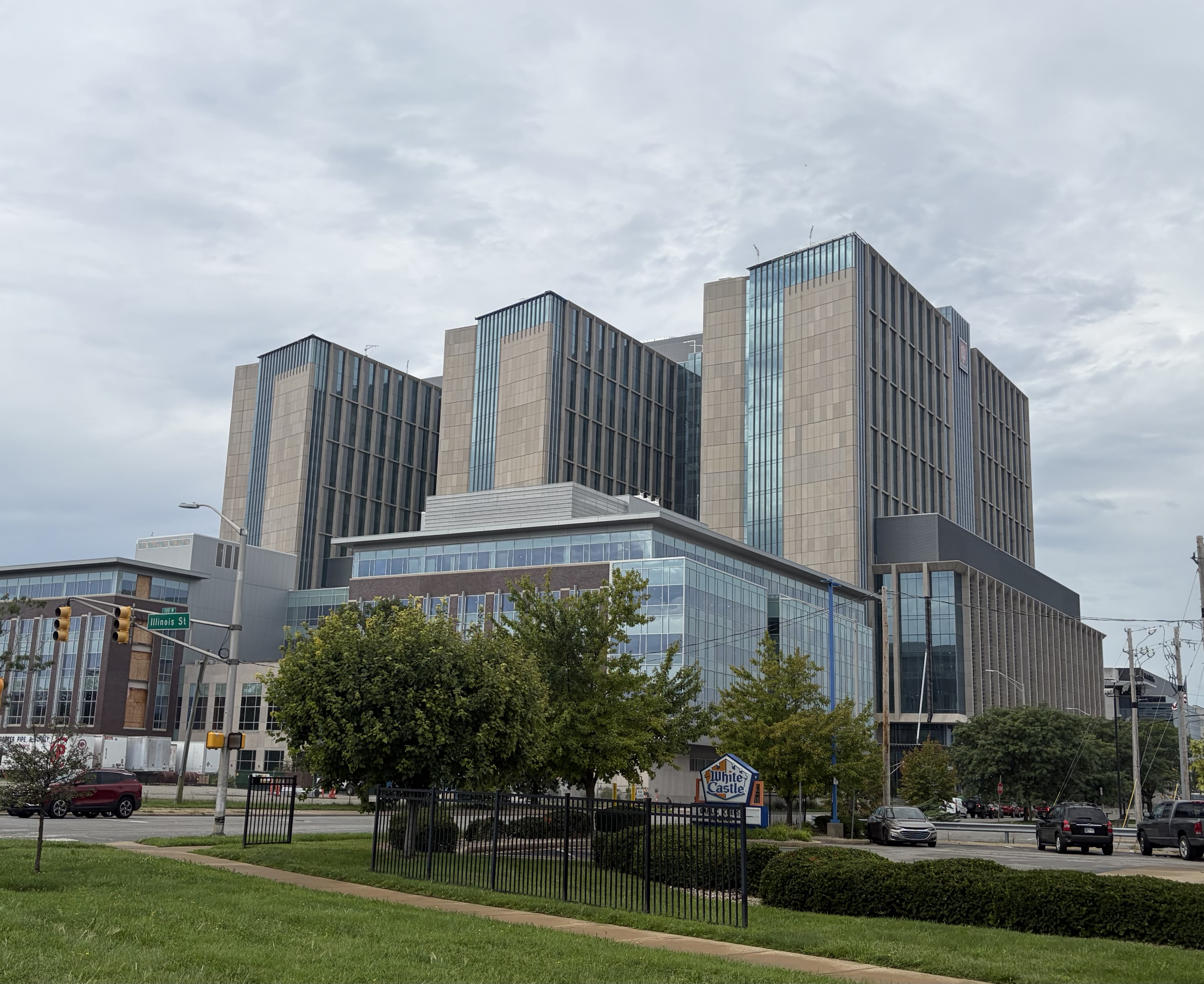
The nearly completed IU Health Methodist Hospital expansion in 2026

In 2022, IU Health broke ground on a multi-billion dollar expansion of the Methodist Hospital campus in one of the largest healthcare construction undertakings in the United States. Expected to open in late 2027, the new 2-million-square-foot (190×10^{3} m^{2}) medical center will feature three 16-story towers and will consolidate adult care services from both Methodist and University hospitals into a single downtown facility. The campus is expected to include 864 private patient beds, 50 operating rooms, and dedicated clinical institutes for cancer, cardiovascular, and neuroscience care.

== See also ==
- List of hospitals in Indianapolis
- List of stroke centers in the United States
- List of trauma centers in the United States
