= Susanne Vandegrift Moore =

American editor and publisher

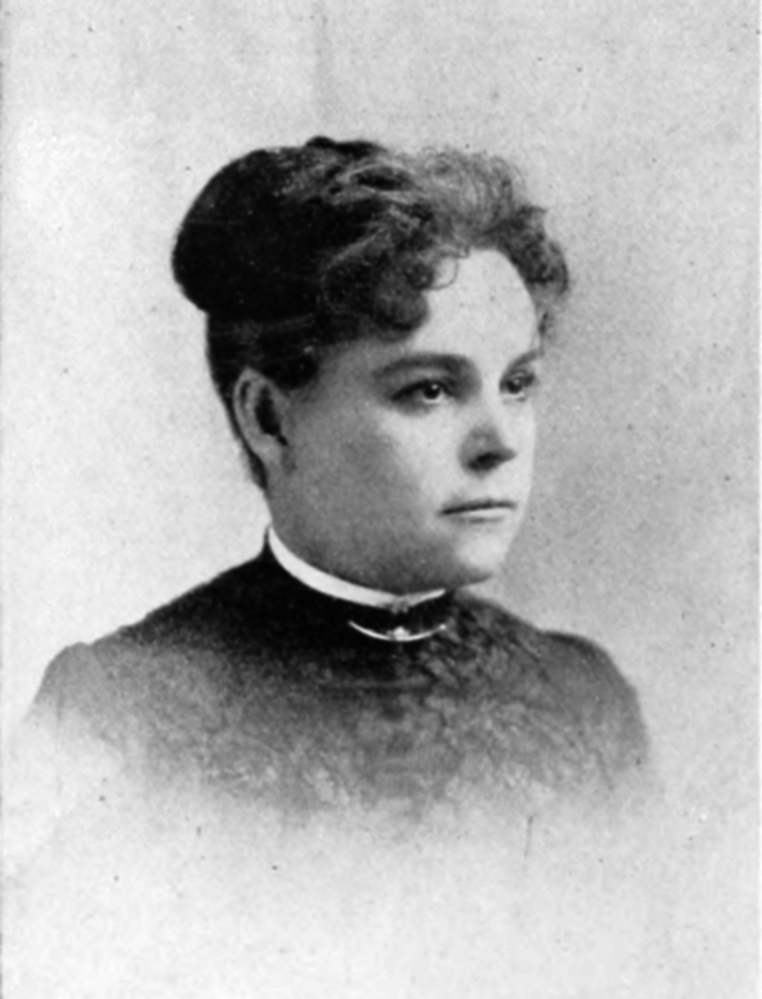
- Photo in A Woman of the Century
- Born: May 15, 1848; Bucks County, Pennsylvania, U.S.
- Died: 1926 (aged 77–78)
- Resting place: Evergreen Cemetery, Jacksonville, Florida, U.S.
- Occupations: editor, publisher

Susanne Vandegrift Moore (May 15, 1848 - 1926) was an American editor and publisher. During the period of 1889–97, she was the editor and owner of the weekly, St. Louis Life. She was friends with Kate Chopin.

== Biography ==
Susanne ("Sue") Vandegrift Moore born in Bucks County, Pennsylvania, May 15, 1848. She was educated in a female seminary in Philadelphia, Pennsylvania. She taught for several years after graduation in private and public schools. In 1877, she married, and with her husband, moved to St. Louis, Missouri. She became a regular contributor to the St. Louis Spectator and contributed to the woman's department of the New York World. Thrown upon her own resources, she began in 1889 the publication of an illustrated weekly journal, St. Louis Life, of which she was editor and owner. The venture was successful, providing for a comfortable income. She died in Jacksonville, Florida, 1926, and was buried in that city's Evergreen Cemetery.
