= Indiana University Health University Hospital =

Hospital in Indianapolis, Indiana, US

University Hospital
- Indiana University Health
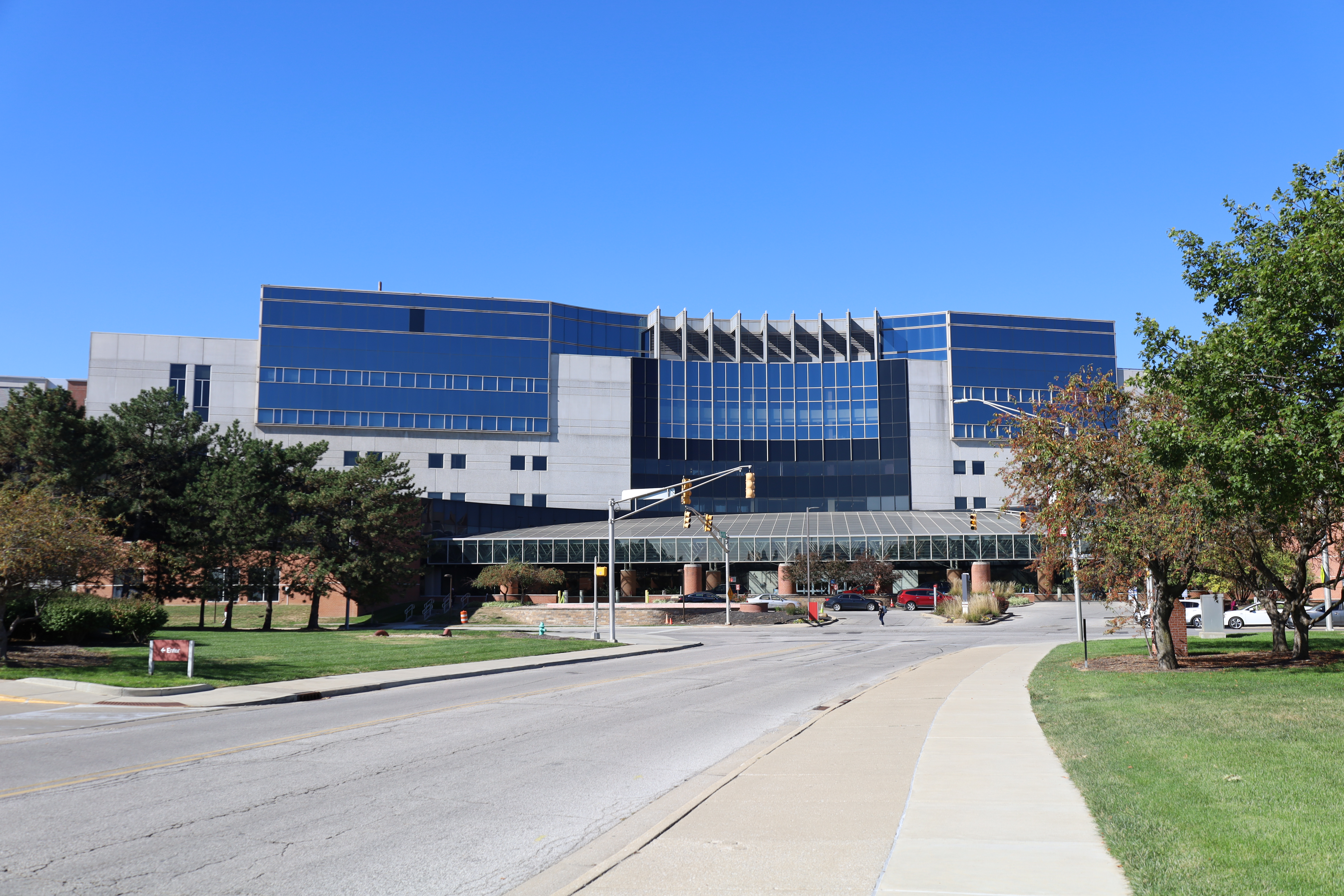
- University Hospital from North Street in 2024

Geography
- Location: 550 University Blvd., Indianapolis, Indiana, United States
- Coordinates: 39°46′32″N 86°10′36″W

Organization
- Type: Teaching
- Affiliated university: Indiana University School of Medicine

Services
- Emergency department: No

Helipads
- Helipad: No

Links
- Website: www.iuhealth.org/university/
- Lists: Hospitals in Indiana

Indiana University Health University Hospital is a teaching hospital in Indianapolis, Indiana, United States. It is affiliated with the Indiana University School of Medicine and Indiana University Health.

With nearly 1,100 physician faculty members at Indiana University Health University Hospital, physicians, surgeons, nurses and staff care for more than 57,000 patients a year. Approximately 52 percent of physicians in Indiana were trained at Indiana University Health University Hospital. In addition, Indiana University Health University Hospital physicians and staff continuously seek advances in medicine. The staff actively participate in approximately 150 clinical and prevention trials to provide optimal patient treatments.

Indiana University Health University Hospital is affiliated with the Indiana University Melvin and Bren Simon Comprehensive Cancer Center (IUSCC). The Simon Cancer Center is Indiana's only National Cancer Institute–designated comprehensive cancer center and is accredited by the American College of Surgeons Commission on Cancer. The center was named in recognition of Melvin and Bren Simon's $50 million donation in 2006.

As part of Indiana University Health, the hospital works closely with nearby Indiana University Health Methodist Hospital and Riley Hospital for Children at Indiana University Health.

The Indiana University Health University Hospital Emergency Department closed on June 30, 2014, with its adult emergency room care services moving to the Indiana University Health Methodist Hospital Emergency Medicine and Trauma Center.

== See also ==
- List of hospitals in Indianapolis
