= Indiana University Health =

Nonprofit healthcare system in Indianapolis, Indiana, US

- Formerly: Clarian Health Partners
- Type: Private
- Industry: Health care
- Headquarters: Indianapolis, Indiana, U.S.
- Website: iuhealth.org

Indiana University Health, formerly known as Clarian Health Partners, is a nonprofit healthcare system located in Indianapolis, Indiana, United States. It is the largest and most comprehensive healthcare system in Indiana, with 16 hospitals under its IU Health brand and over 38,000 employees. It has a partnership with the Indiana University School of Medicine (IUSM). The IU Health system has a total capacity of 2,684 beds.

== History ==
IU Health's creation dates to January 1, 1997, when three Indianapolis hospitals – Methodist Hospital, James Whitcomb Riley Hospital for Children, and Indiana University Hospital – merged to form Clarian Health Partners. The hospitals were operated as one institution with three locations. Based in Indianapolis, the hospital system soon grew to include other hospitals and health centers across the state.

In January 2011, Clarian Health adopted the new name of Indiana University Health. The new brand did not change the corporate structure. IU Health remained an independent, nonprofit health system with for-profit entities, with the Methodist Church and the Indiana University Board of Trustees as corporate board members.

The system's flagship hospital, IU Health Methodist (originally called Methodist Episcopal Hospital and Deaconess Home), opened in 1908 on the site of a former baseball park. Two years later the hospital's affiliation with the Indianapolis Motor Speedway began when the city's first motorized ambulance began bringing patients to Methodist from the racetrack. Methodist expanded over the decades and was the site of numerous medical firsts, including the nation's first heart transplant at a private hospital (1982) and Indiana's first double-lung transplant (1995).

Riley Hospital for Children became Indiana's first children's hospital when it opened in 1924, named after Hoosier poet James Whitcomb Riley. The 300-room hospital provides care to more than 300,000 children a year. Nearby Indiana University Hospital opened in 1970 as a teaching hospital affiliated with the Indiana University School of Medicine (IUSM), replacing Long Hospital that had been in operation since 1914.

IU Health's LifeLine helicopter is the oldest air ambulance in Indiana, having begun flying in 1979. The IU Health-owned People Mover train, which was open to the public, began running in 2003 on a 1.4-mile dual track that runs above city streets and crosses underneath Interstate 65. The People Mover ceased operation in February 2019 due to high maintenance costs and was replaced by an extensive shuttle bus system that offers transport between the three downtown hospitals.

The health system launched a major expansion into Indianapolis’ suburbs in 2005 with the opening of IU Health West and IU Health North hospitals in Avon and Carmel, respectively.

In 2008, the health system moved its administrative offices into Fairbanks Hall, a six-story office and clinical studies building constructed along the Indiana Central Canal that it shares with the IU School of Medicine. Another significant expansion came in 2012 when IU Health opened a $100 million neuroscience building near Methodist Hospital, in which houses IUSM's Stark Neurosciences Research Institute.

In more recent years, IU Health has expanded outpatient services while reducing its hospital holdings. In 2015, it converted IU Health Morgan Hospital into an outpatient facility and sold its majority interest in IU Health LaPorte and Starke hospitals in northern Indiana. At the same time, IU Health added physicians’ offices and opened multiple urgent care centers. It also operates insurance plans for employers, families, and individuals, including the Medicare-eligible.

In 2016, IU Health announced it would move women's services including maternity care from its Methodist campus to Riley Hospital for Children. The same year brought the retirement of Daniel F. Evans Jr., who served 14 years as IU Health's second CEO, was a key architect of its creation and growth, and was the fifth generation of his family to serve at IU Health Methodist Hospital. He was replaced by Dennis M. Murphy, a hospital administrator from Chicago who had been groomed as Evans' successor.

In 2022, IU Health announced plans to construct a new flagship facility to consolidate University and Methodist hospitals with an expected cost of $4.3 billion, one of the most expensive capital projects ever undertaken in Indiana's history. Located on a 44-acre campus just south of the current Methodist Hospital, the new hospital will be 16 stories high, cover an estimated two million square feet, and contain 864 modern hospital rooms. It is expected to open in 2027. Connected to the new hospital via skybridges will be the aforementioned neuroscience building and IUSM's new $230 million medical education and research building, expected to open in November 2024. A name for the hospital has not been chosen at this time, nor have plans been announced for the existing Methodist and University hospital buildings.

== Leadership ==
Indiana University Health has a 14-member board responsible for making sure the health system carries out its mission and approving its budget, long-range plans, medical staff appointments, new services and major policies.

IU Health's executive leadership includes:

- Dennis Murphy, president and chief executive officer: Murphy joined IU Health in 2013 as chief operating officer and was named president in September 2015. On May 1, 2016, he succeeded Daniel F. Evans Jr. as CEO upon Evans' retirement.
- Michelle Janney, PhD, RN, executive vice president & chief operating officer: Janney joined IU Health in 2015.

=== University Health System Consortium ===
For four consecutive years, IU Health Methodist Hospital has been recognized as one of the nation's best academic medical centers by the University HealthSystem Consortium. Of 98 academic medical centers included in the analysis, IU Health Methodist Hospital is one of five to earn the Quality Leadership Award. Academic Medical Centers were assessed across a broad spectrum of care including safety, timeliness, effectiveness, efficiency, equity and patient-centeredness.

=== Magnet designation ===
Arnett Hospital as well as Arnett Ambulatory sites, West Hospital, Ball Hospital, Bloomington Hospital, Methodist Hospital, University Hospital, and Riley Hospital for Children have been designated as Magnet hospital systems by the American Nurses Credentialing Center in recognition of excellence in nursing care.

== Locations ==
Indiana University Health hospitals include:

- Indiana University Health Arnett Hospital (Lafayette)
- Indiana University Health Arnett Hospital Hospice (Lafayette)
- Indiana University Health Ball Memorial Hospital (Muncie)
- Indiana University Health Bedford Hospital (Bedford)
- Indiana University Health Blackford Hospital (Hartford City)
- Indiana University Health Bloomington Hospital (Bloomington)
- Indiana University Health Frankfort Hospital (Frankfort)
- Indiana University Health Jay Hospital (Portland)
- Indiana University Health Methodist Hospital (Indianapolis)
- Indiana University Health Morgan Hospital (Martinsville)
- Indiana University Health North Hospital (Carmel)
- Indiana University Health Paoli Hospital (Paoli)
- Indiana University Health Fishers (Fishers)
- Indiana University Health Tipton Hospital (Tipton)
- Indiana University Health University Hospital (Indianapolis)
- Indiana University Health West Hospital (Avon)
- Indiana University Health White Memorial Hospital (Monticello)
- Riley Hospital for Children at Indiana University Health (Indianapolis)
- Riley Hospital for Children at Indiana University Health North Hospital (Carmel)

IU Health has two of the Level I Trauma Centers in the state of Indiana - IU Health Methodist Hospital (adult) and Riley Hospital for Children at Indiana University Health (pediatric). IU Health's Trauma Centers include multidisciplinary teams of board-certified physicians, nurses and technicians available onsite to treat the most severely injured patients at all times. IU Health Arnett Hospital became Indiana's first level 3 verified trauma center in April 2013.

== Statistics ==
- Systemwide admissions (2023): 113,000+
- Staffed beds: 2,684
- Surgery Cases: 122,461
- Full-time equivalent employees: 38,079
