= Robert William Davidson =

American sculptor (1904–1982)

Robert William Davidson (1904–1982) was an American sculptor.

Davidson was born in Indianapolis, Indiana in 1904. He was an apprentice to his father, Oscar Davidson, also an artist. He studied sculpture at the John Herron Art Institute (now the Herron School of Art), the Art Institute of Chicago, the School of American Sculpture in New York City, and the Bavarian Fine Arts Academy in Munich, Germany. His paternal lineage is traced to the early 17th century, the beginning of the colonies.

Davidson's wife, Maryetta Mauck, was an Indiana ceramics artist and they both graduated from the John Herron Art Institute in 1926. They moved to Saratoga Springs, New York where Davidson taught art at Skidmore College from 1934 to 1972. He moved to Saratoga under the intention of creating the sculptures for the Hall of Springs yet through an unfortunate event, the man spearheading this project died, and the offer was not respected. So, Davidson never fulfilled this job, however, he followed a career in Saratoga that would entail a life of mastering the Arts of his field; he educated those wanting of the arts and refined those of whom he, through an artist's eye, deemed "the Artists of Mankind."

Davidson is a nationally known artist whose work is in the collections of the Indianapolis Museum of Art and the Smithsonian. He has won many awards for his works including the Art Association Prize at the Herron Art Institute in 1925, the Harry Johnson Prize from Hoosier Salon in 1930, and two first prize wins at the Indiana State Fair in 1923 and 1924. He died in Schenectady, New York in 1982.

According to a Hathorn Gallery, Skidmore College Retrospective Exhibition, on February 6–27, 1972 the following accolades were attributed to R.W. Davidson in his brochure:

It is with great pleasure that we present this retrospective exhibit of sculpture, drawings, paintings, and prints by Mr. Robert W. Davidson. Throughout his career as a teacher and sculptor, he has widely exhibited his work and received man honors. Yet we are particularly happy that this exhibit is one of the events in the celebration of Skidmore's 50th Anniversary celebration, for Mr. Davidson has been a very real part of the Skidmore Community for many years. We would like to take this opportunity to thank those who have willingly agreed to loan works for this exhibit; Mrs. Ivan Smith, Mr. James Benton, Mr and Mrs. Frank Eaton, Mr. R.D. McDowell, Mr. Theophile Krawiec, The Indianapolis Museum of Art, The Munson-Williams-Proctor Institute, and Weatherspoon Art Gallery, University of north Carolina at Greensboro. To Mr. David Murray and Mr. Peter Winant, Mr. Davidson's student assistants, should go special thanks for their help throughout the preparation of this exhibit.

— George F. Kuebler, director, Hathorn Gallery.

It is altogether fitting that an exhibition of work by Robert Davidson is one of the first events of the 50th anniversary celebration of Skidmore, which in its earliest days, even before it became a full-fledged college, encouraged work in the arts and in its half century as a college has become known for its exceptional art department. Robert Davidson joined the faculty of the Skidmore Art Department in 1933. For almost 4 decades, then, for almost all of Skidmores College life, he has inspired students to work as beginning sculptors and to see the relationship of sculpture to the other visual arts which the department offers- to painting, drawing, graphics, ceramics. Indeed, in addition to teaching sculpture, he himself has been one of its effective teachers of drawing. From almost the beginning of his career his works have been added to distinguished museums and private collections, a record to which this current retrospective show gives impressive evidence.

— Edwin M. Moseley, Provost and Dean of Faculty

I have known Bob Davidson as a colleague and friend for twenty years or more and have made certain observations about him which are a privilege to record. He is an artist whose attitude about life is reflected in his respect and concern for his fellow man; for individual thought and expression; a desire to help any and all; his belief in human integrity and dignity.

Bob's images in sculpture, drawing and prints most often evolve around the human figure which he treats uniquely with wit, skill and charm as is most evident in this retrospective exhibition. I have a profound sense of gratitude to one who maintains a constant devotion to his discipline. I am sure I can speak for the many students who have shared his obvious delight in art; his knowledge of history; his respect for the present and his recognition always of the inner struggle of artists as well as the student new to materials, ideas and images. He delights us all in reminiscences of well-known artists who have been his personal friends.

Congratulations and thank you once again, Bob Davidson, for sharing so generously with us your contribution, your tangible personal response to life.

— Earl B. Pardon, Chairman, Art Department
