= Riley Hospital for Children =

Children's hospital in Indianapolis, Indiana, US

- Indiana University Health

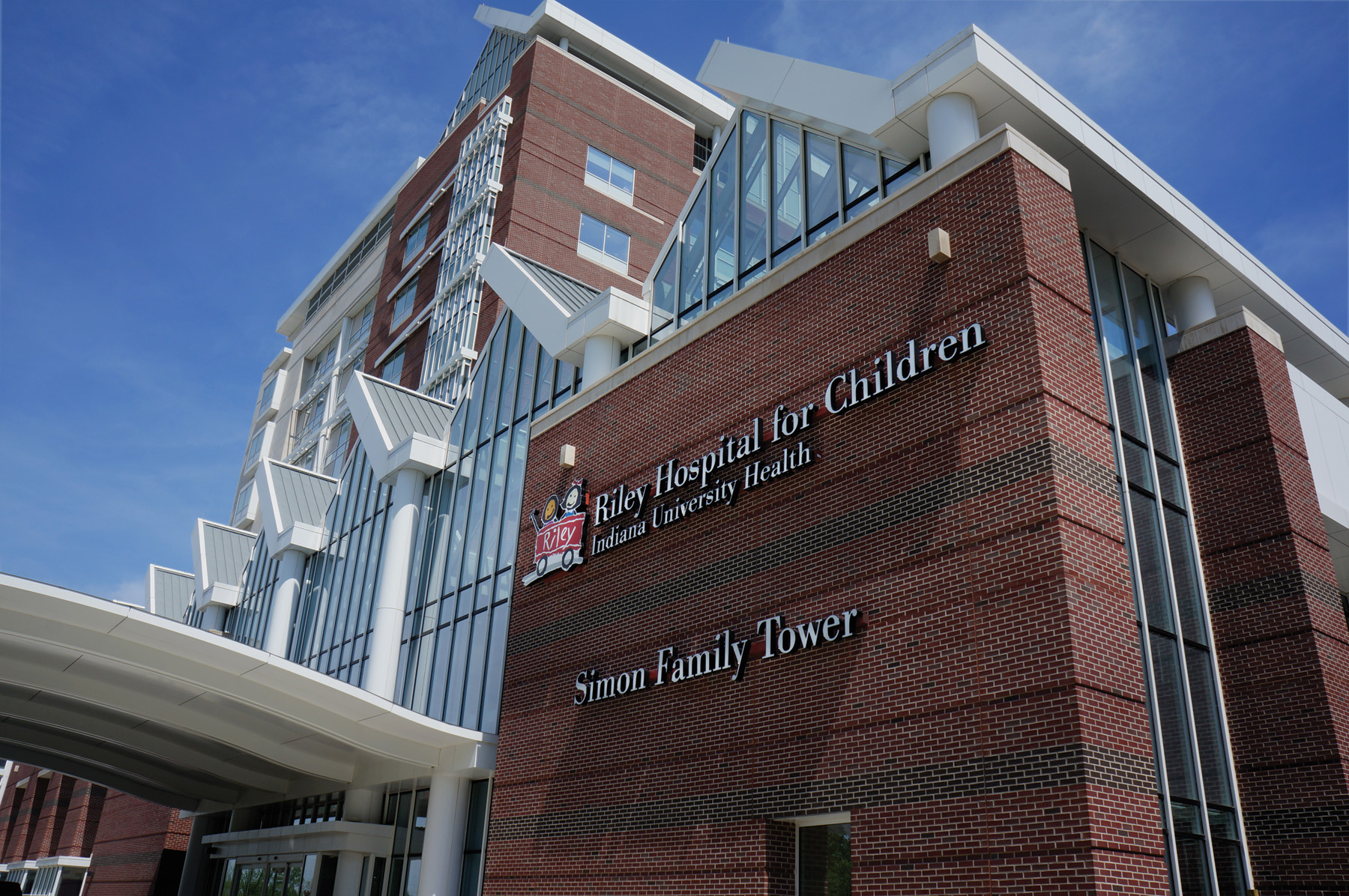
- Riley Hospital for Children Simon Family Tower in 2014

Geography
- Location: 705 Riley Hospital Dr., Indianapolis, Indiana, United States
- Coordinates: 39°46′40″N 86°10′47″W

Organization
- Care system: Non-profit
- Type: Specialist
- Affiliated university: Indiana University Health

Services
- Emergency department: Level I Pediatric Trauma Center
- Beds: 456
- Specialty: Pediatrics

Helipads
- Helipad: FAA LID: 23IN
Number	Length		Surface
Number	ft	m	Surface
H1	50 x 50	15 × 15	concrete
H2	50 x 50	15 × 15	asphalt/concrete

History
- Founded: 1924

Links
- Website: www.rileychildrens.org
- Lists: Hospitals in Indiana

The Riley Hospital for Children at Indiana University Health is a nationally ranked freestanding 456-bed, pediatric acute care children's hospital in Indianapolis, Indiana, United States. It is affiliated with the Indiana University School of Medicine. Riley Hospital for Children is a member of the Indiana University Health system, the only children's hospital in the network. The hospital provides comprehensive pediatric specialties and subspecialties to infants, children, teens, and young adults aged 0–21 throughout Indiana and features an ACS verified level I pediatric trauma center. Its regional pediatric intensive-care unit and neonatal intensive care units serve the entire Midwest region. In addition, Riley has two helipads for rapid transport of emergent pediatric care. Riley Hospital for Children is named for James Whitcomb Riley, a writer and poet who lived in Indianapolis.

In 1916, the Rotary Club of Indianapolis, of which Riley was a member, started the Riley Memorial Association (later called Riley Children's Foundation) to build a children's hospital in memory of him. The hospital opened in 1924. In 1950, the foundation started Camp Riley, a camp in south central Indiana for children with disabilities.

Ranked eleventh overall out of about 250 children's hospitals throughout the U.S. by Child magazine, Riley Hospital for Children serves as Indiana's only comprehensive pediatric medical center. Together, they help more than 57,000 patients annually. If a family is not able to pay for its child's medical costs, Riley offers medical care to all Indiana children regardless. The hospital has 456 licensed beds, 11,105 admissions and observation cases, 162,466 outpatient visits, 15,000 emergency department visits, 2,028 full-time staff, and 235 medical staff.

== History ==
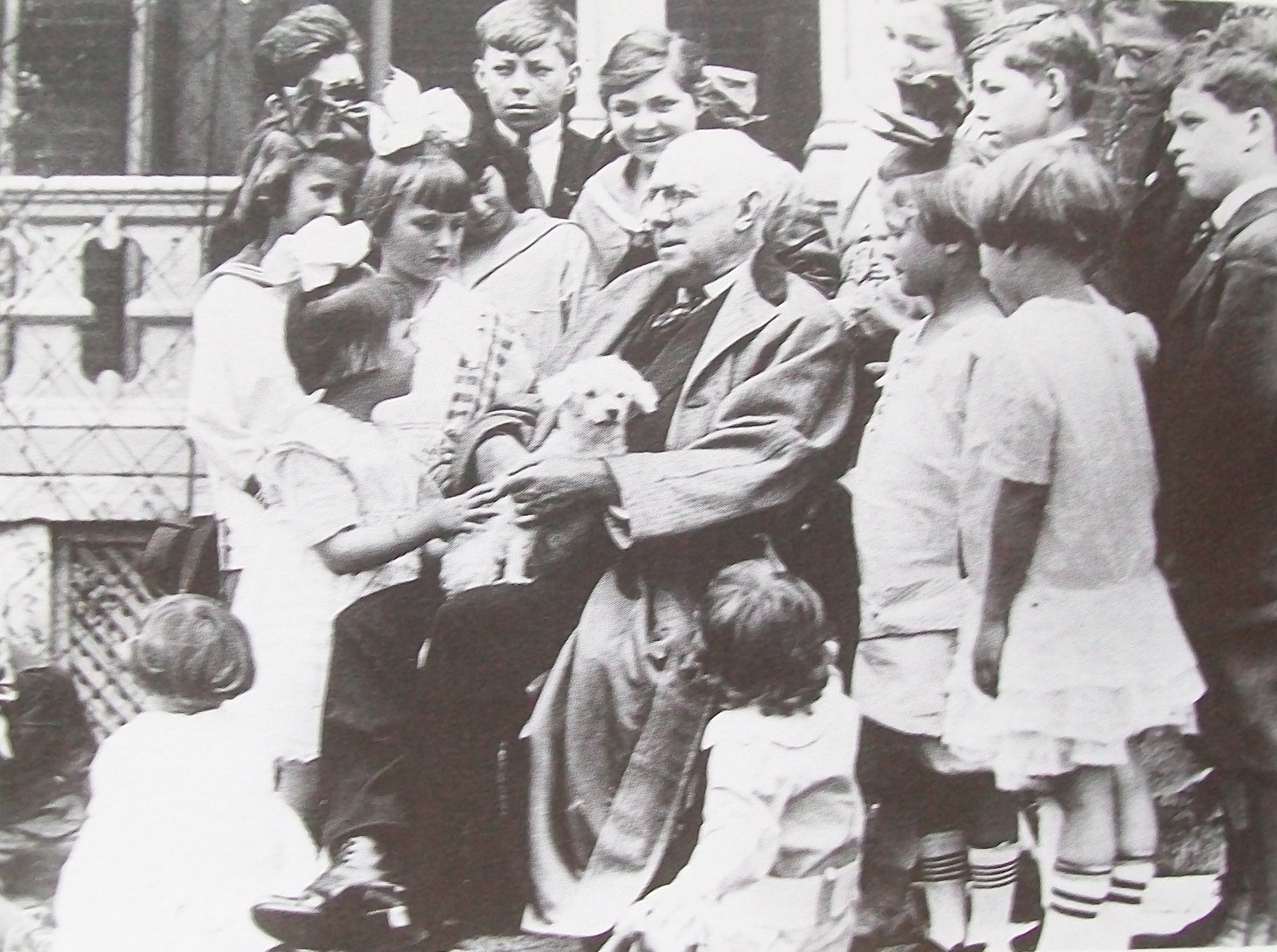
James Whitcomb Riley, the hospital's namesake, was known as the Children's Poet.

Named for the poet James Whitcomb Riley, Riley Hospital began treating children in 1924. In 1921, the Riley Memorial Association, today called the Riley Children's Foundation, was founded with the intention of building a children's hospital in memory of Riley, whose love for children was communicated through his poems. In 1935, the hospital installed a hydrotherapeutic pool, the dedication of which President Franklin Delano Roosevelt attended.

Cardiovascular care is one of the hospital's areas of concentration. Beginning in 1951, the first pediatric cardiac catheterization laboratory in Indiana opened at Riley. After opening the laboratory, the hospital was the first in the nation to carry out percutaneous cardiac catheterization in children. In 1966, the hospital became the first in Indiana to use echocardiography, a test that uses sound waves to create a moving picture of the heart which is more detailed than an X-ray image and involves no exposure to radiation, to detect congenital heart defects.

In 1971, Riley launched Indiana's earliest and sole pediatric burn center along with Indiana's first neonatal intensive care unit. That year Riley also initiated a new model for family-centered care called the Parent Care Unit. This allowed for open visitation, for the participation of parents, and for parents to sleep in the room with their child. In 1975, the Fontan procedure, which separates oxygenated blood from deoxygenated blood during surgery, was first staged in Indiana at Riley. Riley also was the first in Indiana to offer outpatient surgical care to children.

In 1983, Riley inserted Indiana's first cochlear implant into a deaf child. After this, the hospital was the first to achieve a successful heart-lung bypass surgery, also called an ECMO procedure, for critically ill infants and children. In 1988, Riley performed the first liver transplant in Indiana. After being the first in Indiana to transplant livers in children, Riley, a year later, executed the first infant and newborn heart transplants.

In the 1990s, Riley Hospital opened the Herman B Wells Center for Pediatric Research, along with the only pediatric cancer center in Indiana with a stem cell transplant unit. Later, in 1994, physicians performed Indiana's initial pediatric cord blood transplant.

In 1997, Riley Hospital for Children joined with Indiana University Hospital and Methodist Hospital to form Clarian Health Partners (now known as Indiana University Health). Shortly after, U.S. News & World Report magazine recognized Clarian Health Partners as some of the finest hospitals in the United States from 1997 through 2005.

The Riley Outpatient Center was launched in 2000 and has the biggest ambulatory care center for children. In 2001, the largest pediatric sleep lab in the world, called the Riley Sleep Disorders Center, began at Riley Hospital. In 2002, the Riley Heart Center for children with heart defects opened. Also in that year, the hospital was authorized to proceed with Phase 1 of pediatric cancer research protocols. The Christian Sarkine Autism Treatment Center, one of the most extensive autism centers in the United States, was also started in 2002. In 2003, inaugural intestinal and multi-organ transplants for the state of Indiana were performed at Riley. Riley also received special authorization for the usage of the Berlin Heart in that year. The Berlin Heart is a ventricular assist device used to treat difficult cardiac problems. That year Riley surgeons started using Repiphysis, a prosthetic that is implanted in limbs and started performing pulmonary autograft mitral valve replacement, a new way for restoring the mitral valve. In 2004, the Clarian Health Partners were the first to receive the dignified Magnet designation. Riley received high ranking on Child magazine's America's best children's hospitals list. Finally, in 2005, Riley commenced its $500 million, ten-year plan, and its Neonatal Intensive Care Unit was ranked in the top five in the nation according to Child magazine.

In November 2020, Dwayne "The Rock" Johnson collaborated with Microsoft and billionaire Bill Gates to donate Xbox Series X consoles to the Riley Hospital for Children along with 19 other children's hospitals throughout the country.

== Riley Children’s Foundation ==
In 1921, the Riley Children's Foundation was formed in remembrance of James Whitcomb Riley with the intention of constructing a children's hospital. The foundations fundraising efforts allowed for the hospital provide free medical care. The foundation also funds Camp Riley and the James Whitcomb Riley Museum Home. Camp Riley, located in Bradford Woods, which began in 1955, is a camp for disabled children. The camp staff has training to give proper emotional, medical, and physical support to the campers. Medical practitioners and nurses are at the camp twenty-four hours to ensure maximum safety.

== Neonatal intensive care unit and pediatric pulmonary program ==
Established in 1970, Riley's neonatal intensive care unit (NICU) has thirty plus neonatologists, 180 neonatal nurses, and twenty neonatal respiratory therapists, along with social workers and dieticians. The pediatric pulmonary program was created in 1976 and currently treats more than 14,000 patients annually. Its department includes twenty-four physicians, nineteen nurses, ten respiratory therapists, and social workers and dieticians. This program leads Indiana in diagnosing and treating infants, children, and adolescents who have acute and chronic respiratory disease.

== See also ==
- Indiana University Dance Marathon
- List of hospitals in Indianapolis
- List of burn centers in the United States
- List of children's hospitals in the United States
- List of stroke centers in the United States
- List of trauma centers in the United States
- List of tallest buildings in Indianapolis
