= Van Nuys Medical Science Building =

- Former names: Medical Science Building
- Alternative names: Van Nuys Hall

General information
- Location: 635 Barnhill Dr, Indianapolis, IN 46202-5120
- Coordinates: 39°46′35.634″N 86°10′41.412″W
- Named for: John D. Van Nuys
- Groundbreaking: 1958
- Completed: 1959
- Cost: $7.5 million
- Affiliation: Indiana University–Purdue University Indianapolis

Design and construction
- Architects: Daggett, Neagle & Associates

The Van Nuys Medical Science Building is located on the IUPUI Campus as part of the IU Medical Center. The building serves as an academic and research facility for the IU School of Medicine providing significant laboratory space for the campus. Originally, the building served to consolidate academic laboratory functions on the campus into a singular facility and provide space for the creation of a more robust medical library. Upon completion, the building provided new research space for Robert W. Long Hall, William H. Coleman Hall, Fesler Hall, Willis D. Gatch Hall, and Emerson Hall. The building is located just north of Emerson Hall and University Hospital, and adjacent to the Medical Research and Library Building.

== History ==
The Indiana University School of Medicine began pushing for a new medical science building in the early 1950s to increase their research capabilities on the Indianapolis campus. The Indiana General Assembly approved the $4.5 million construction of medical building in 1953. The medical science building was the largest single expenditure at that time by the IU School of Medicine.

The Medical Science Building began construction in 1958 and was completed in 1959 for a total of $7.5 million. The building was designed by Daggett, Neagle & Associates. Following the completion of the building, the School of Nursing Library was moved from the Ball Annex. The Nursing Library would combine with the School of Medicine Library to create a larger medical research library. The library would move again with the opening of the Medical Research and Library building in 1989.

The Department of Pharmacology and Toxicology moved into the new Medical Science Building once it opened. The Department of Anatomy and Department of Physiology moved from Myers Hall on the Bloomington Campus to the new building to join the rest of the School of Medicine. This was a response to increasing criticism of the division of instruction between IU campuses. The pathology department moved its teaching, research, and autopsy service from Fesler Hall to the first floor of the south wing of the building. The Medical Science Building created a new autopsy room and morgue on campus for medical research. The autopsy room had previously been located at Gatch Hall. The first floor of the north wing included an open museum area with special glass cases for the pathology department to display their glass jar medical museum.

The Van Nuys Medical Science Building underwent significant renovation projects in 1981, 1991, and 1998 to ensure state-of-the-art educational and research facilities for medical students and graduate students in the basic sciences. The Medical Science Building has an addition constructed in 1981 for $2.5 million. In 1988, the building was renovated to improve the electrical systems, air conditioning, and windows. Following the renovations, the Department of Biochemistry moved to the new southeast wing, which allowed the Department of Physiology to move into the south wing. Between 1990 and 1999, the Department of Anatomy split with the Neuroscience Division on the fifth floor and the rest of the department on the second floor. In 1993, the School of Medicine opened the Center for Diabetes Research in a 5,800-square-foot research space. The research space was temporary until the completion of the Medical Research Building III.

During the mid-2000s and 2010s, the building has been renovated multiple times to continue creating innovative research spaces. In 2007, the building was renovated to create research lab space, two new tissue-culture rooms, administrative offices, and a conference room on the lower level for the Department of Biochemistry and Molecular Biology. In 2013, various lab facilities were renovated to create additional usable space and additional infrastructure for medical research. In 2018, the Medical Science Building was renovated by American Structurepoint to bring the facility up to current research and academic standards.

== Namesake ==
The Van Nuys Medical Science Building is named after John D. Van Nuys, former dean of the Indiana School of Medicine (1947–1964). Van Nuys led the construction of the medical science building to bring the first year of medical school to the Indianapolis campus. In 1950, Van Nuys received the Distinguished Service Award of the Indiana Public Health Association and an honorary Doctor of Science degree from Wabash College in 1952.

== See also ==
- Indiana University–Purdue University Indianapolis Public Art Collection
