= Erbelding =

Erbelding is a surname of German origin. Notable people with the surname include:

- Emily Erbelding (born 1961), American physician-scientist
- Patricia Erbelding (born 1958), French artist

== See also ==
- Erpelding
