= Ann Kimble-Hill =

American biochemist and academic

Ann Carol Kimble-Hill
- Education: University of Illinois Chicago; Purdue University; University of Michigan
- Scientific career
- Institutions: Indiana University School of Medicine; Argonne National Laboratory
- Thesis: Biophysical mechanisms of protein recruitment to raft domains studied using planar model (2008)

Ann Carol Kimble-Hill is an American biochemist who is a Professor of Biochemistry at the Indiana University School of Medicine. Her research considers the structure-function relationships of membrane proteins and lipids, and the role of Type 2 diabetes in disparities associated with breast cancer. She was made a Fellow of the American Chemical Society in 2023.

== Early life and education ==
Kimble-Hill was an undergraduate student at the University of Michigan, where she majored in pharmaceutical engineering. Alongside basic science, Kimble-Hill was interested in public perception of science and medical research. She joined the National Organization for the Professional Advancement of Black Chemists and Chemical Engineers Biophysical Society. For her graduate studies, she moved to the University of Illinois Chicago, where she specialized in chemical engineering. She moved to Purdue for doctoral study, where she studied the biophysical mechanisms of protein recruitment to raft domains. She worked as a postdoctoral researcher at the Argonne National Laboratory and Indiana University School of Medicine.

== Research and career ==
Kimble-Hill joined the faculty at the Indiana University School of Medicine in 2015. Her research considers structure-function relationships in biological systems (such as membrane proteins and lipids) and health disparities associated with breast cancer. Of all ethnic groups, non-Hispanic Black women have the highest incidence of breast cancer. Her work has suggested that Type 2 diabetes is associated with higher incidences of breast cancer.

Kimble-Hill leads the Indiana University Research Education Program that seeks to support students from underrepresented minorities.

Kimble-Hill was elected Fellow of the American Chemical Society in 2023.

== Selected publications ==
- May Khanna; Che-Hong Chen; Ann Kimble-Hill; et al. (16 December 2011). "Discovery of a Novel Class of Covalent Inhibitor for Aldehyde Dehydrogenases". Journal of Biological Chemistry. 286 (50): 43486–94. doi:10.1074/JBC.M111.293597. ISSN 0021-9258. PMC 3234859. PMID 22021038. Wikidata Q27675184.
- Bibek Parajuli; Ann C. Kimble-Hill; May Khanna; Yvelina Ivanova; Samy Meroueh; Thomas D. Hurley (22 February 2011). "Discovery of novel regulators of aldehyde dehydrogenase isoenzymes". Chemico-biological Interactions. 191 (1–3): 153–158. doi:10.1016/J.CBI.2011.02.018. ISSN 0009-2797. PMC 3103606. PMID 21349255. Wikidata Q33829318.
- Ann Kimble-Hill; Armando Rivera-Figueroa; Benny C. Chan; et al. (17 August 2020). "Insights Gained into Marginalized Students Access Challenges During the COVID-19 Academic Response". Journal of Chemical Education. 97 (9): 3391–3395. doi:10.1021/ACS.JCHEMED.0C00774. ISSN 0021-9584. Wikidata Q101542325.
