= Gene B. Glick =

American philanthropist and builder

- Born: Eugene Biccard Glick; August 29, 1921; Indianapolis, Indiana, U.S.
- Died: October 2, 2013 (aged 92); Indianapolis, Indiana, U.S.
- Education: Indiana University
- Occupations: Builder and philanthropist
- Years active: 1947–2013
- Known for: The Gene B. Glick Company, The Glick Fund, Glick Family Foundation
- Spouse: Marilyn Glick (m. 1947; died 2012)

Eugene B. Glick (August 29, 1921 – October 2, 2013) was an American philanthropist and builder from Indiana. After returning from serving with the U.S. Army in the European theater during World War II, he and his wife, Marilyn Glick, began constructing housing in the Indianapolis area with other military veterans in mind. Originally concentrating on building single-family homes and then shifting to apartment projects in the 1960s, the Glicks amassed a considerable fortune over their lifetimes, the bulk of which they used for extensive philanthropic endeavors.

With more than $142 million in charitable donations to date, the Glicks' philanthropic impact on the state of Indiana is one of the largest of any family-based organization. Many significant cultural landmarks, civic endeavors and educational entities across the state bear the Glick name.

After the deaths of Marilyn Glick in 2012 and Eugene Glick in 2013, oversight of the company and philanthropic activities has remained under the control of their children and other family members.

== Personal life and military service ==
Eugene Biccard Glick was born in Indianapolis on August 29, 1921, the eldest son of Reuben and Faye Biccard Glick. The family was Jewish of German ancestry. His younger brother, Arthur, died of spinal meningitis in 1937. Gene attended Shortridge High School at the same time as author Kurt Vonnegut. While attending Indiana University in Bloomington, he operated a charter bus service for students.

After graduating from Indiana University in December 1942 with a bachelor's degree in business, Glick enlisted in the United States Army. Glick served as an infantry combat instructor until June 1944, when he was deployed to Italy. He soon requested a transfer to the French front, and joined the 179th Regiment of the 45th Infantry Division. His fluency in German led to him serving as an interrogator for Army scouts.

He was nearly killed during the Battle of the Bulge, which greatly affected his outlook on life. In his book Born to Build, Glick recounted that on November 11, 1944, he huddled under cover during an intense artillery barrage for hours, and promised himself that if he survived he would always look back on that day as a lesson to never lose hope.

Glick and his unit liberated the Dachau concentration camp. He had a camera with him and helped document the atrocities of the Holocaust; Glick later donated his photographs to the United States Holocaust Memorial Museum and Emory University. While serving in the war, Glick received the European Theater medal, the Combat Infantryman Badge and the Bronze Star.

Glick's wartime experiences led to him being featured in Tom Brokaw's best-selling book, The Greatest Generation, as well as contemporaneous television broadcasts hosted by Tom Brokaw and Matt Lauer.

Upon returning to Indianapolis after mustering out, Glick founded the G.I. loans department at People's Bank. Glick married Marilyn Koffman in 1947, and together they began building single-family homes in Indianapolis, an enterprise that eventually became the Gene B. Glick Company.

The couple had four daughters: Marianne Glick, Arlene Grande, Alice Meshbane, and Lynda Schwartz. The Glicks raised their family in the Indianapolis area and continued to reside there for the rest of their lives. In 1982, they created the Eugene and Marilyn Glick Family Foundation and began to devote more of their time and wealth to charitable causes.

They remained active in the Indianapolis Jewish community as members of the Indianapolis Hebrew Congregation, and were patrons of the Jewish Federation of Greater Indianapolis, whose community center is named after Glick's brother, Arthur.

Gene Glick died on October 2, 2013, at the age of 92.

== The Gene B. Glick Company ==
The Gene B. Glick Company is a multifamily housing development and property management company founded by Gene Glick in 1947. Based in Indianapolis, Indiana, it is one of the largest privately owned firms in the apartment industry within the state and nationwide. As of 2017 it owns and operates properties in 12 states, with more than 20,000 apartment units and approximately 7,000 employees.

Glick started the company, then known as Indianapolis Homes Inc., building single family houses on the Eastside of Indianapolis using money he saved while serving in the Army, as well as savings of his wife, Marilyn. His stated aim was to help other military veterans successfully transition to civilian life. During the 1950s the company became a leading franchisee of National Homes, expanding from building single homes to entire subdivisions.

By 1962, the company had changed its name to the Gene B. Glick Company and was generating more than $1 million in sales annually. In this same year, the company built its first apartment community, Williamsburg East. The business changed its focus from single-family houses to multifamily communities, with an emphasis on creating affordable homes for low-income families using federal Section 8 funding. By 1968, the Gene B. Glick Company had shifted its business model to building, acquiring and managing apartment buildings.

From the late 1960s to the 1980s, the company expanded from Indiana to Ohio, Florida, Georgia, Michigan, Minnesota, Pennsylvania, New York, Virginia, Kentucky and Illinois.

By the 2000s, Gene and Marilyn Glick became focused on their philanthropic endeavors, turning over more of the daily operations to their children and grandchildren. Gene Glick officially retired in 2008, at which point his granddaughter's husband, David Barrett, became President and CEO of the Gene B. Glick Company.

The company has continued to expand over the past decade, building or acquiring more apartment communities as well as a new national headquarters building in Indianapolis. In 2017 it expanded into its 12th state, Wisconsin.

== Philanthropy and honors ==
Gene Glick is regarded as one of the most significant philanthropists in Indiana history. Gene and Marilyn Glick made charitable contributions throughout their lives that grew as their personal fortune did.

In 1982, they established the Eugene and Marilyn Glick Family Foundation to organize their philanthropic endeavors. It was later joined by the Glick Family Housing Foundation, which focuses on providing homes and support services for low-income families; the Glick Fund administered by the Central Indiana Community Foundation, which primarily goes toward education, self-sufficiency and the arts; and a separate Glick Fund of the Jewish Federation of Greater Indianapolis.

Glick's philanthropic efforts focused on education, health care, affordable housing for low-income families, community support services and the arts. Numerous buildings, landmarks, educational programs and cultural endeavors across Indiana are named after the Glicks.

The Indianapolis Cultural Trail: A Legacy of Gene & Marilyn Glick is an 8-mile network of urban pedestrian and bike corridors linking the city's seven Indianapolis Cultural Districts. It opened in 2013 after 12 years of planning and six years of construction at a total cost of $62.5 million in a public-private partnership. The Glicks donated $15 million as seed money for the project.

The Eugene and Marilyn Glick History Center, a museum in downtown Indianapolis for historical artifacts that also hosts many cultural events, serves as the headquarters of the Indiana Historical Society. The center was built in 1999 and reopened and renamed in 2010 in honor of the Glick's $8 million gift to the project.

In 2007, Gene and Marilyn gave $30 million to Indiana University to establish the Glick Eye Institute, which houses the Department of Ophthalmology at the Indiana University School of Medicine. Gene Glick had previously established an IU scholarship program in his name.

In conjunction with the Indianapolis Public Library Foundation, the Glicks created the Indiana Authors Awards recognizing notable Indiana writers beginning in 2009.

In 2017, the Glick Fund gave a grant to the local NPR affiliate, WFYI, to fund a reporter position covering issues of poverty and health.

Other notable institutions to receive Glick donations include the Indianapolis Museum of Art, the Indianapolis Symphony Orchestra, United Way of Central Indiana, Riley Children's Hospital, Second Helpings, the Indianapolis Art Center, Ball State University and TeenWorks, a job-training program for local underprivileged teens that Gene Glick launched in the 1980s.

Glick received numerous personal awards and honors during his lifetime. He received the Sagamore of the Wabash, the state of Indiana's highest civilian award at the time, on three occasions – in 1982, 1992 and 2005 – making him one of only four people to receive the Sagamore three or more times.

He was named an Indiana Living Legend by the Indiana Historical Society in 2002. The Indiana Chapter of the National Society of Fund Raising Executives, now known as the Association of Fundraising Professionals, gave him their Lifetime Achievement Award. He was a member of both the National Housing Hall of Fame and the Central Indiana Business Hall of Fame. Glick received an honorary Doctor of Laws degree from Butler University in 1992.
