= Trends in Cardiovascular Medicine =

- Discipline: Cardiology
- Language: English
- Edited by: Douglas Zipes

Publication details
- History: 1991-present
- Publisher: Elsevier
- Frequency: 8/year
- Impact factor: 4.462 (2018)

Standard abbreviations
- ISO 4: Trends Cardiovasc. Med.

Indexing
- CODEN: TCMDEQ
- ISSN: 1050-1738

Links
- Journal homepage; Online access; Online archive

Trends in Cardiovascular Medicine is a peer-reviewed medical journal publishing review articles covering cardiology. It was established in 1991 and is published 8 times per year by Elsevier. The editor-in-chief is Dougla Zipes (Indiana University School of Medicine). According to the Journal Citation Reports, the journal has a 2018 impact factor of 4.462.
