= Eugene and Marilyn Glick Eye Institute =

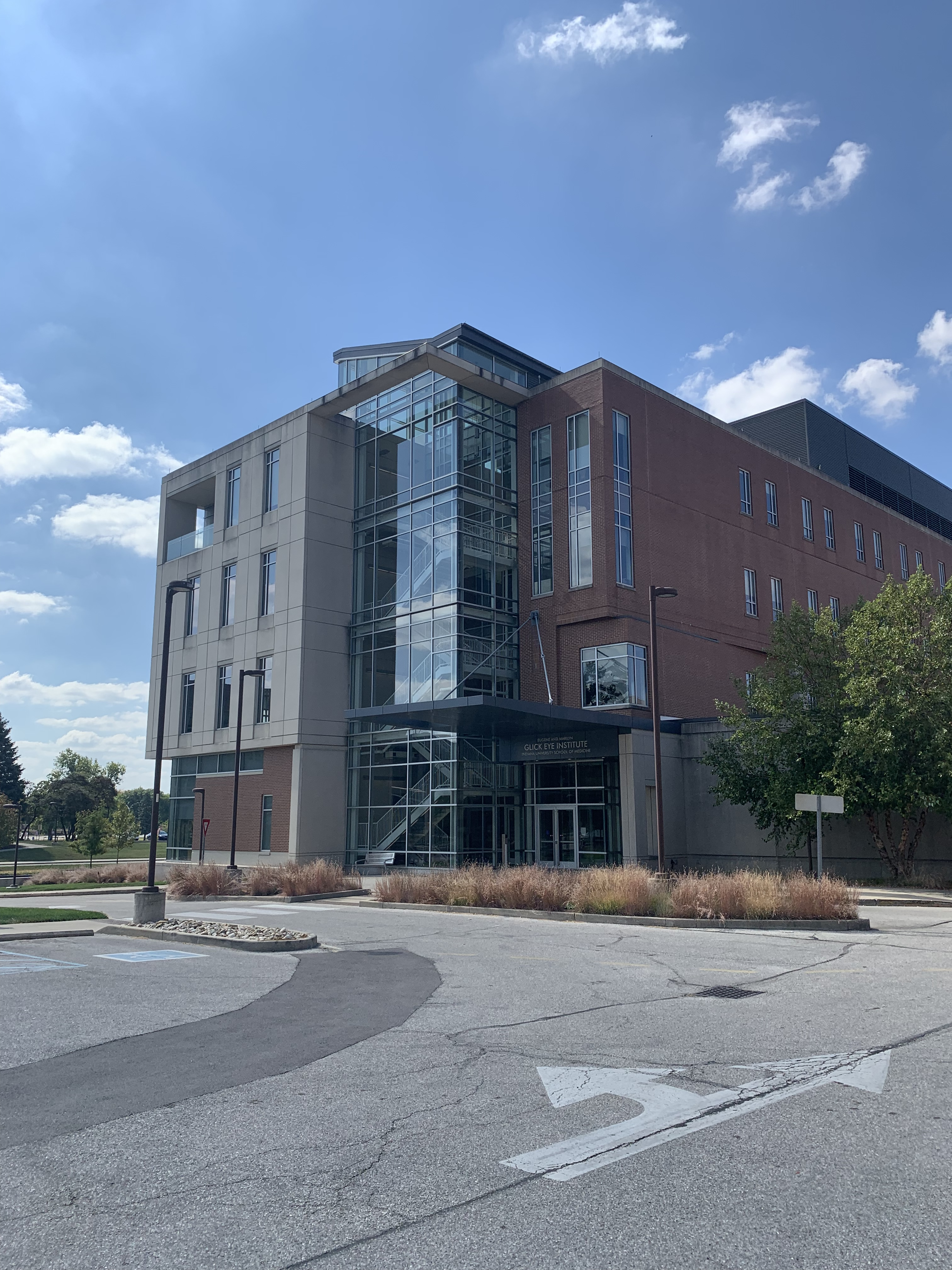
- Eugene and Marilyn Glick Eye Institute, 2023.

General information
- Location: 1160 W. Michigan St., Indianapolis, IN 46202
- Coordinates: 39°46′29.978″N 86°10′50.106″W
- Named for: Eugene and Marilyn Glick
- Groundbreaking: 2008
- Completed: 2011
- Affiliation: Indiana University-Purdue University Indianapolis

Design and construction
- Architecture firm: Ratio Architects, Inc.
- Main contractor: F.A Wilhelm Construction Company

The Eugene and Marilyn Glick Eye Institute is located at the corner of West Drive and Michigan Avenue on the IUPUI campus. The facility provides research opportunities for Ophthalmology and clinical services for patients at nearby healthcare facilities including Riley Children's Hospital and University Hospital.

== History ==
The groundbreaking ceremony for the Eugene and Marilyn Glick Eye Institute took place on October 7, 2008. The building was located on the northeast corner of Michigan Street and West Drive, immediately west of Robert W. Long Hall. The building would serve as the new home for the Department of Ophthalmology, which resided in the Rotary Building at that time. IUPUI received a $30 million gift from the Eugene and Marilyn Glick Family Foundation to fund the construction of the institute. The four-story, 70,000-square-foot building contained an adult outpatient clinic, ophthalmology classrooms, an optical shop, a basic science research center, faculty and administrative offices, and graduate student meeting rooms. The building was constructed by Ratio Architects, Inc. The F.A. Wilhelm Construction Company served as general contractor for the construction of the new building.

The institute officially opened on August 19, 2011. The first-floor clinic served patients suffering from vision loss and eye disease, along with a conference room and optical shop. The three floors above were dedicated to administration, learning, and research. It was the first building to achieve LEED Gold certification on the Indiana University campuses. Leadership in Energy and Environmental Design (LEED) is a green building certification program developed by the U.S. Green Building Council. The eye institute was the first building on the Indianapolis campus to earn a LEED certification. The Institute commissioned a sculpture titled "Open Eyes" by Don Gummer to be installed in the quad beside the new entrance. The new building allowed the IU School of Medicine to consolidate departmental resources from each hospital and the Rotary Building.

In 2012, the exterior grounds surrounding the institute, Coleman Hall, Fesler Hall, Gatch Hall, and Long Hall were improved for the Clinical Quadrangle area. The purpose of the renovation was to improve the site for future usage in special events, stormwater management systems, and continue improving campus sustainability. In 2017, the interior space on the third and fourth floor were built out to further increase research space for the Indiana University School of Medicine. The renovation of the upper two floors cost $4.5 billion.

== Namesake ==
The eye institute is named after Eugene B. Glick and Marilyn Glick. In 2007, Eugene and Marilyn gave $30 million to Indiana University to establish the Glick Eye Institute, which now houses the Department of Ophthalmology at the Indiana University School of Medicine. The Glicks provided funding for construction and endowment funds to promote research and educational capabilities following completion.

== See also ==
- Indiana University–Purdue University Indianapolis Public Art Collection
