= Erpelding =

Erpelding is a surname of Luxembourgish origin. Notable people with the surname include:

- Diane Erpelding (born 1982), Luxembourgish dressage rider
- Mat Erpelding (born 1975), American politician
- Félicie Erpelding-Schlesser (1883–1970), Luxembourgish municipal politician
- Alexander Erpelding (born 2014), Luxemburgish Actor

== See also ==
- Erbelding
