= Allison Brashear =

American neurologist

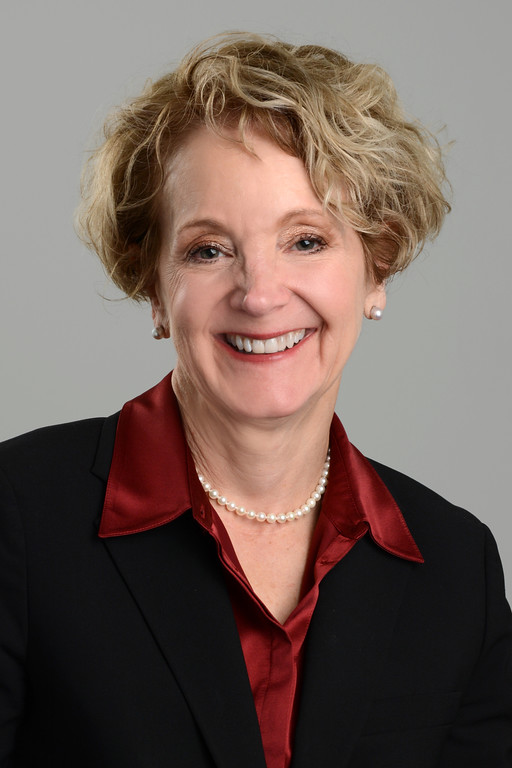

Allison Brashear is an American neurologist. She was appointed vice president for health sciences and dean of the Jacobs School of Medicine and Biomedical Sciences at the University at Buffalo, New York, in December 2021.

In 2025, she was elected to the National Academy of Medicine, recognizing her leadership in academic medicine and neuroscience. She was dean of the UC Davis School of Medicine until November 2021 and previously served as the Walter C. Teagle Endowed Chair of Neurology at Wake Forest School of Medicine.

Brashear is a trustee of the McKnight Brain Research Foundation and serves on the boards of the Association of American Medical Colleges and the Western New York Women’s Foundation. She is also a member of the AAMC Council of Deans Administrative Board and was named chair-elect in 2024. In 2023, she received the ATHENA Leadership Award from the Buffalo Niagara Partnership.

== Early life and education ==
Brashear was born into a medical family; her father was a pulmonologist and her mother held a PhD in marriage and family therapy. She attended Park Tudor School in Indiana and later earned their Distinguished Alumni award. Following high school, Brashear earned her Bachelor of Science degree in chemistry from DePauw University in 1983. She earned her medical degree from Indiana University School of Medicine, which awarded her the 2024 Distinguished Medical Alumni Award.

== Career ==
Upon earning her medical degree from Indiana University School of Medicine, Brashear stayed at the institution as a professor of neurology until 2005. During her tenure at Indiana University, Brashear was the first person to show that botulinum toxin improved spasticity in wrists and fingers in stroke patients. As a result of her research, she was chosen to succeed B. Todd Troost as chairwoman of the Department of Neurology at Wake Forest School of Medicine.

While working at Wake Forest, Brashear continued her studies on botulinum toxin and was selected to develop new guidelines on the use of Botox by American Academy of Neurology. In 2008, the guidelines released by the organization confirmed that Botox was safe and effective for treating a variety of neurological conditions. In the same year, she was also elected to the board of directors of Wake Forest University Baptist Medical Center and was the recipient of the 2008 Community Leadership Award.

Brashear expanded her research beyond botulinum toxin and earned a grant from the National Institute of Neurological Disorders and Stroke to study the genetic mutation of ATP1A3. The results of her research project, which surveyed 56 individuals, found that there was a shared genetic link between psychiatric problems and movement disorders. Brashear has received continuous National Institutes of Health funding for her research since 2008.

In 2019, Brashear left Wake Forest to become the dean of the UC Davis School of Medicine by chancellor Gary S. May. While serving in this role, she has sat on the American Board of Psychiatry and Neurology, the American Neurological Association, the American Academy of Neurology, and the California Institute for Regenerative Medicine Board.

She is a trustee of the McKnight Brain Research Foundation and the immediate past vice chair of the American Board of Psychiatry and Neurology. She is also a board member of the Western New York Women's Foundation.

== Personal life ==
Brashear is married to attorney Clifford Ong and they have two children together.
