= Suzanne Knoebel =

American cardiologist and academic

- Born: December 13, 1926
- Died: July 2, 2014 (aged 87)
- Education: B.A. Goucher College, 1948; M.D. Indiana University School of Medicine, 1960
- Occupation: Cardiologist
- Employer: Indiana University School of Medicine

Suzanne Knoebel (December 13, 1926 – July 2, 2014) was an American internationally known cardiologist, a member of the Indiana University School of Medicine faculty, a visiting fellow at the National Institutes of Health, and the first female president of the American College of Cardiology (1982–83). She was especially known for her interests in academic research, education, and patient care.

Knoebel was affiliated with the IU School of Medicine's Krannert Institute of Cardiology, where she served as the institute's associate director (1974–90) and the medical school's assistant dean for research. Knoebel was named the Herman C. and Ellnora D. Krannert Professor of Medicine in 1977. Dr. Steven C. Beering, a former dean of the IU medical school and a former chairman of the Association of American Medical Colleges, credited Knoebel with pioneering the use of computer technology to diagnose and research heart disease.

Knoebel, a native of Fort Wayne, Indiana, earned an undergraduate degree in international relations from Goucher College in Baltimore, Maryland, in 1948, and worked for the Chamber of Commerce in Hawaii for several years before returning to Indiana. Knoebel earned a medical degree from Indiana University's School of Medicine in 1960, joined its faculty in 1964, and retired from IU in 2000. Knoebel was the recipient of numerous awards, including the Matrix Award for Indiana Woman of the Year in 1983, the IU School of Medicine's Distinguished Alumnus award in 1984, and the American College of Cardiology's Distinguished Fellowship award in 1986. The Ladies' Home Journal included Knoebel on its list of the "100 Most Important Women in America" in 1983. In addition to publishing numerous research papers on scientific and medical topics, Knoebel was the author of two children's books and two novels.

== Education ==
Knoebel attended Goucher College in Baltimore, Maryland after her high school. She graduated with the degree in International Relations in the year 1948. After graduation she moved to Honolulu, Hawaii and started working at Hawaii Chamber of Commerce. She then enrolled at Indiana University School of Medicine (IUSM) and earned her medical degree in 1960. She did her internship, residency, and fellowship at IUSM in cardiology. After her graduation she was visiting fellow at National Institutes of Health studying Cardiology.
