= Robert W. Long Hall =

Academic building in Indianapolis, Indiana, US

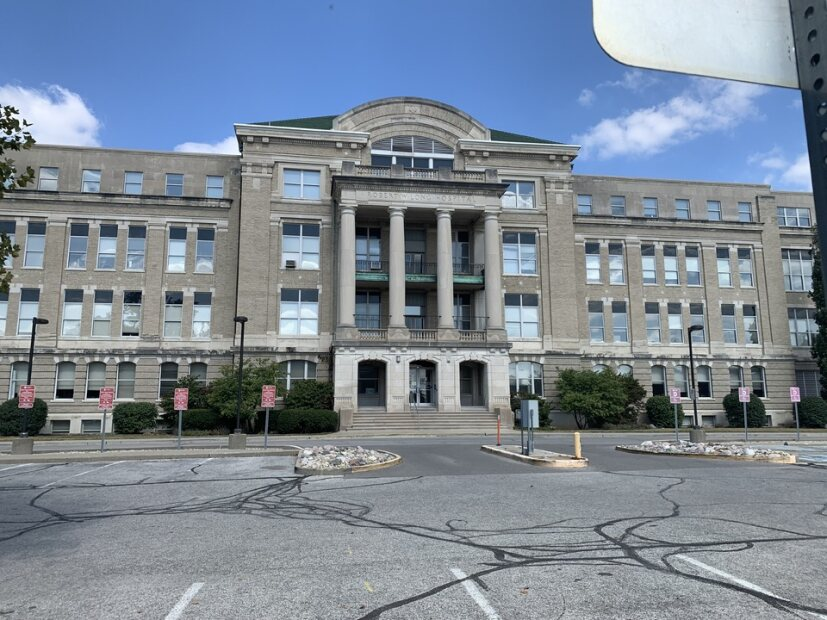
- Robert W. Long Hall, 2023.
- Former names: Robert W. Long Hospital

General information
- Architectural style: Neoclassical
- Location: 1110 W Michigan St., Indianapolis, Indiana, U.S. 46202-5100
- Coordinates: 39°46′30.838″N 86°10′45.523″W
- Named for: Robert W. Long
- Groundbreaking: 1912
- Completed: 1914
- Opened: June 15, 1915
- Affiliation: Indiana University-Purdue University Indianapolis

Design and construction
- Architect: Robert P. Daggett

Robert W. Long Hall is a building part of the Indiana University Medical Center on the campus of Indiana University Indianapolis in Indianapolis, Indiana, United States. The building houses various departments from the Indiana University School of Medicine (IUSM). The Robert W. Long Hospital was the first hospital constructed on the university campus that served as a training institution for medical students in Indianapolis. Long Hall served as one of the early focal points for the growth of the IUSM with many buildings including the first medical school building, Emerson Hall. Other early buildings included Willis D. Gatch Hall, William H. Coleman Hall, and Fesler Hall. Newer buildings constructed in the cluster include the School of Nursing Building and the Eugene and Marilyn Glick Eye Institute.

== History ==
In 1910, Robert W. Long met with Dr. John Finch Barnhill, the first head of the Indiana University Department of Otolaryngology, to discuss establishing a teaching hospital as part of the IU School of Medicine. In 1911, Governor Thomas R. Marshall announced Long's gift to the public, which totaled $240,000. The new hospital was designed by Robert P. Daggett using other hospitals as inspiration for more modern facilities. The trustees purchased the site and ground was broken for the new hospital on November 1, 1912.

Long Hospital officially opened on June 15, 1914, and was supervised by the Indiana University School of Medicine. When it opened in 1914, Long Hospital was equipped with the latest in medical technology, including X-ray machines, surgical suites, laboratories, and experimental emergency floor lighting. The original Long Hospital contained 138 hospital beds for patients. By 1917, Emerson recognized that Long Hospital did not possess adequate pediatric facilities and there may be a need for a dedicated pediatric hospital. The original autopsy room was located in the basement of the hospital with the earliest case recorded in 1914. It opened during the first year of World War I. Just two years later, the hospital would be bombarded with cases from the influenza pandemic.

In 1934, Willis Dew Gatch appropriated funds to purchase new bedding and operating equipment for Long Hospital as part of a campus-wide renovation project for healthcare facilities. In 1939, Gatch raised more funds to expand the School of Medicine's healthcare capabilities. This included more additional bed space, a new isolation ward, and a central sterilization room for Long Hospital. In 1948, the Lions Club of Indiana funded the installation of a Million Volt X-Ray Machine, which was originally designed to inspect the armor plating of tanks and ships built for World War II. In 1955, the Indiana General Assembly approved the construction of a new university hospital and remodeling of Long Hospital to include ambulatory care. In 1961, the General Clinical Research center was established on the top floor of Long Hospital as part of expanding research opportunities for the School of Medicine.

The hospital closed and the building became part of IUPUI in 1970, with the opening of the new University Hospital. Following Long Hall's change from a hospital to an academic space, Indiana University converted existing spaces into the building to create classrooms, offices, and new facilities. In 1971, the Student Employee Health Service, located on the first floor of Long Hall, opened programs for student workers in non-medical positions to provide healthcare. The clinic was expanded to include two new offices, an examination room, a clerical space, and a waiting room. In 1974, the first floor was renovated to house the new Department of Family Practice and related services. In 1975, the IU School of Medicine established the first state Rheumatology Division which was housed in Long Hospital.

Indiana University erected a marker commemorating the historical impact of Robert W. Long Hospital on the development of the IU Medical Center and Indianapolis healthcare in 2007. On June 6, 2010, the Robert W. Long Hospital was renamed Robert W. Long Hall.

== See also ==
- Indiana University–Purdue University Indianapolis Public Art Collection
- List of hospitals in Indianapolis § Defunct
