= Fesler Hall =

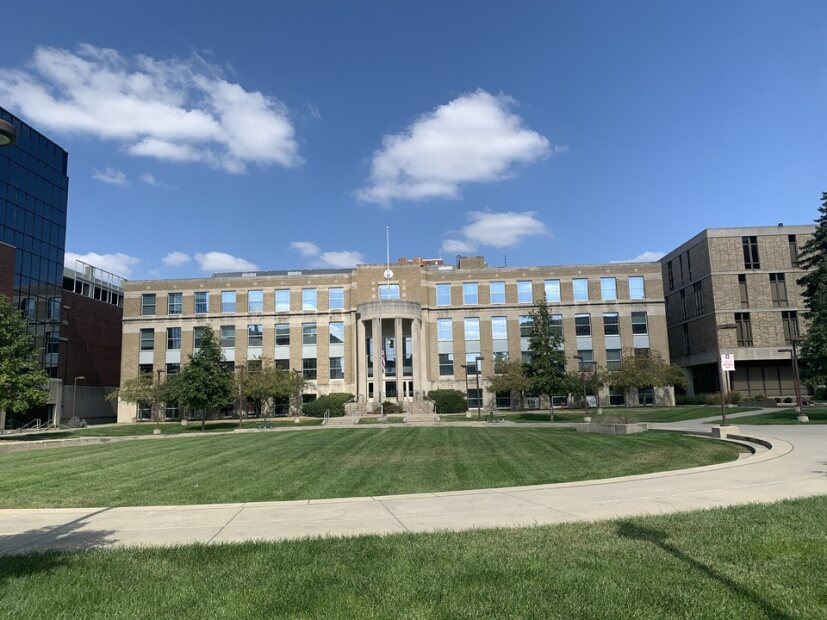
- Main entrance of Fesler Hall, 2023.
- Former names: Hurty Hall, Laboratory Science Building, and the Indiana State Board of Health Building

General information
- Architectural style: Art Deco/Modern
- Location: 1130 W. Michigan St., Indianapolis, IN 46202-5113
- Coordinates: 39°46′33.718″N 86°10′37.942″W
- Completed: 1938
- Affiliation: Indiana University-Purdue University Indianapolis

Design and construction
- Architect: Joe H. Wildermuth & Co. Architects

Fesler Hall is located on the western end of Indiana University Indianapolis campus as part of the IU Medical Center. The building was the former site of the Indiana State Board of Health headquarters until being occupied by Indiana University in 1949. During the board of health's occupation, the building served as a hub for public health outreach and education programs in cooperation with the Indiana University School of Medicine. Indiana University used the building as a new center for clinical programs located on the campus to compensate the growing medical student population. Fesler Hall is located in a cluster of medical facilities that include the Eugene and Marilyn Glick Eye Institute, William H. Coleman Hall, Robert W. Long Hall, Willis D. Gatch Hall, and the School of Nursing Building.

== History ==
=== Indiana State Board of Health Building ===
In 1938, the Indiana State Board of Health moved into a newly constructed building, sometimes referred to as the Laboratory Science Building, designed by Joe H. Wildermuth & Co. Architects. The construction was funded as a Public Works Administration (PWA) project and approved by Governor M. Clifford Townsend due to the lobbying efforts of Thurman B. Rice to create a better healthcare system for Indiana. The State Board of Health would occupy this building from 1939 to 1949 and name it Hurty Hall.

During the 1940s, the State Board of Health Building served as a site to discuss public health concerns, especially those related to long-term illnesses such as syphilis, malaria, tuberculosis, and polio. Following the United States entrance into World War II, the building supported the education of national defense and public health. In January 1942, Dr. John Ferree, Secretary of the State Board of Health, spoke before the Indianapolis League of Women Voters on "National Defense and the Public Health". Blood drives were hosted at the building for donations to soldiers serving in World War II. The Indiana State Board of Health promoted many health-related activities and civilian defense. Civilian defense generally meant local volunteer programs designed to protect civilian life and property during times of conflict in the United States. One of these concepts were the role of nutrition in war and the homefront during times of rationing. In September 1942, Mary I. Barber, food consultant to the Secretary of War, spoke at Hurty Hall to educate instructors on nutrition education.

The building also served as a platform for civilians to engage with the Indiana state government over developments in the state. An example was in January 1949, farmers from Shelby County, Indiana protested the erection of a dam on Flatrock River at Hurty Hall citing potential destruction of gas wells in the area.

=== Fesler Hall ===
Indiana University acquired the Board of Health building in 1949, and subsequently renamed it Fesler Hall. The new hall was named after James William Fesler, an IU alumnus and former member of the IU Board of Trustees. The interim name was referred to as the Laboratory Science Building before the named Fesler Hall was decided. The medical technology program moved to the fourth floor immediately after IUPUI acquired the building along with the central laboratory. The Department of Pathology moved to the first floor along with the medical student teaching labs. The pathology department established a small glass jar medical museum on the lower floor for the School of Medicine. Surgical pathology moved to the third floor with the clinical labs. Fesler Hall also contained the new dean's and school's administrative offices, department of anesthesiology, and cancer research further serving as a hub for the IU Medical Center.

The completion of the Van Nuys Medical Science Building in 1958 led to various departments relocating from Fesler Hall. The free space allowed IUPUI to shuffle departments around the building and create a blood bank on the first floor. In 1962, Fesler Hall held the office for the Indiana University real estate operations program run by Charles O. Hardy. The IU School of Medicine opened a new Out-Patient Renal Kidney Dialysis Center in Felsler Hall in 1973. The purpose was to provide up to 50 patients with access to artificial kidneys and avoid weekly trips to hospital for dialysis. Each kidney cost an estimated $3,500 with an additional $7,500 for supplies and maintenance equipment.

On November 10, 2023, the IU trustees approved a renovation of the first and second floors of Fesler Hall. The project will free up 18,700 square feet of space for the Department of Obstetrics and Gynecology and the Department of Anesthesia leading to their consolidation into a single location. Various structural and safety systems will be renovated to create a more modern research facility.

== Namesake ==
James Newell Hurty (1852–1925) was born in Lebanon, Ohio, and attended the Philadelphia College of Pharmacy (1871–1872) and the Franklin Institute (1871–1873) before graduating from the Medical College of Indiana (1891). Hurty moved to Indianapolis in 1873 where he opened a drug store and chemistry laboratory at the corner of Ohio and Pennsylvania Street. Hurty was appointed as secretary of the State Board of Health in 1896, where he wrote the first comprehensive pure food and drug law in Indiana. It was passed by the Indiana legislature in 1899, which preceded the Pure Food and Drug Act of 1906. Hurty retired from the State Board of Health in 1922.

James William Fesler (1864–1949) was an Indianapolis attorney and served on the IU Board of Trustees from 1902 to 1936. He served as Vice President of the Board from 1916 to 1919 and President from 1919 to 1936. The building was named in honor of Fesler for his role in the early history of the Indiana University School of Medicine.

== See also ==
- Indiana University–Purdue University Indianapolis Public Art Collection
