= William S. Dalton =

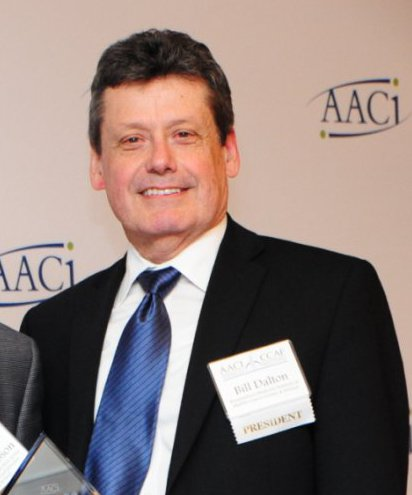
- Education: Indiana University School of Medicine
- Scientific career
- Fields: Oncology
- Workplaces: H. Lee Moffitt Cancer Center and Research Institute, University of Arizona

William S. Dalton is an American physician and oncologist, who is board certified in internal medicine and oncology. Since 2002 he has been the President, Chief Executive Officer, and Center Director of the H. Lee Moffitt Cancer Center and Research Institute at the University of South Florida (USF). He served as dean of the University of Arizona College of Medicine, 2001–2002.

== Education ==
Dalton obtained a Ph.D. in toxicology and medical life sciences as well as a Doctor of Medicine at Indiana University School of Medicine, where he also completed his internship in medicine. He then completed a residency in medicine, a fellowship in oncology and a fellowship in clinical pharmacology at the University of Arizona.

== Career ==
Dalton became a professor of oncology, biochemistry and medicine at University of South Florida in 1997. He was the founding chair of what is now the "Department of Oncologic Sciences". He also served as associate center director for clinical investigations at the Moffitt Cancer Center, becoming deputy director in 1999, and he served as associate vice president of health sciences at USF.

In 2001, Dalton became dean of the University of Arizona College of Medicine, where he had earlier been the founding director of the Bone Marrow Transplant Program. In 2002, after only seven months, he returned to USF as president, chief executive officer, and director of the Moffitt Cancer Center. He established an initiative called Total Cancer Care with an emphasis on a personalized approach to the treatment of cancer.

Dalton also serves as chair of the Science Policy and Legislative Affairs Committee for the American Association for Cancer Research.

== Research ==
Dalton's research concerns drug discovery, the biochemical mechanisms of drug resistance, and the biology and treatment of multiple myeloma. He has published over 250 articles in peer-reviewed scientific and medical journals, which have been cited over 12,000 times, resulting in an h-index of 58.

== Awards ==
- K.K. Chen Award in Pharmacology, Indiana University
- Raymond R. Paradise Memorial Lecturer, Department of Pharmacology, Indiana University
- 10th Annual Theodore Segal Memorial Lecturer, Department of Medicine, University of Louisville
- Fellowship in the American College of Physicians-American Society of Internal Medicine
- 2010 Leadership in Personalized Medicine Award, Personalized Medicine Coalition
- 2013 Fellow, National Academy of Inventors (academyofinventors.org)
- Fellow, American Association for the Advancement of Science (aaas.org)
