= Brownsyne Tucker Edmonds =

Researcher and physician

- Spouse: Joseph Tucker Edmonds

Academic background
- Education: Brown University (BA, MD); Duke University Medical Center (resident); University of Pennsylvania (MS, fellow); Harvard School of Public Health (MS)

Academic work
- Discipline: Medical doctor (obstetrician); Professor; Public health official
- Institutions: Indiana University School of Medicine

Brownsyne Tucker Edmonds is a health equity researcher and physician in the Indiana University School of Medicine, as well as the current inaugural vice president and chief health equity officer for IU Health. She is also the Indiana State Legislative chair for the American Congress of Obstetricians and Gynecologists. She is an associate professor of Obstetrics and Gynecology as well as Clinical Pediatrics in the Indiana University School of Medicine. Her research focuses on making healthcare more equitable for marginalized patients.

== Education ==
Tucker Edmonds graduated from Brown University with a Bachelor of Arts in 2000. She received a Doctor of Medicine in 2005, also from Brown University. In 2009, she completed her residency at Duke University Medical Center in Obstetrics and Gynecology. She also graduated from the University of Pennsylvania with a Master of Science in 2011, as a fellow in the Robert Wood Johnson Foundation Clinical Scholars Program in Health Services Research. She has a master's in Public Health from the Harvard School of Public Health.

== Career and contributions ==
Tucker Edmonds works as a health equity researcher in the department of OB/GYN in Indiana University School of Medicine. She has published in a variety of medical and health related journals such as the American Journal of Bioethics, JAMA Pediatrics, Academic Medicine, Health Affairs, and the American Journal of Obstetrics and Gynecology. She focuses her research on finding ways to make medical care equitable for Black patients.

According to Tucker Edmonds in the Indiana Business Journal, she chose this career because her father was also a gynecologist. She mentions that she wanted to find ways to provide more equitable care to the Black community through research and data.

Tucker Edmonds is an associate professor in Obstetrics and Gynaecology at the Indiana University School of Medicine. She is the first person to serve as the chief health equity officer at IU School of Medicine. She is an associate professor of Obstetrics and Gynecology as well as of Clinical Pediatrics in the Indiana University School of Medicine.

== Awards and honors ==
In 2015-2017, Tucker Edmonds was an Anniversary Fellow for the National Academy of Medicine. She also won the Warren H. Pearse/Wyeth Pharmaceuticals Women's Health Research Award from the American College of Obstetricians and Gynecologists.

== Personal life ==
Tucker Edmonds is married to Joseph Tucker Edmonds. The couple have a daughter, and live in Indianapolis.
