= John A. Galloway =

American endocrinologist (1928–2025)

John A. Galloway MD (December 8, 1928 – April 4, 2025) was an American endocrinologist who made major contributions to the study and treatment of diabetes. He was clinical research fellow and principal physician in charge of diabetes-related research at the Lilly Laboratory for Clinical Research. The holder of four patents and author of over 80 publications, Galloway also served as Professor of Medicine at the Indiana University School of Medicine. Galloway died on April 4, 2025, at the age of 96.

== Education ==
Galloway was born in Omaha, Nebraska. He received a Bachelor of Arts degree from the University of Pennsylvania in 1950. After completing Reserve Officers' Training Corps program, he was commissioned in August, 1950, serving in the U.S. Army, including combat in Korea. He was released in August, 1952, to go to medical school, and graduated in 1956, from the University of Nebraska College of Medicine. He did his internship at Nebraska Methodist Hospital in Omaha and his residency in internal medicine at Temple University Hospital in Philadelphia. During his last year, he was the chief medical resident. He was then a fellow and instructor in endocrinology and diabetes at Temple, 1960-61.

== Career ==
For nineteen years, Galloway was the principal physician in charge of diabetes-related research at the Lilly Laboratory for Clinical Research at the Wishard Memorial Hospital, at Indiana University School of Medicine.

In December 1993, Galloway retired from the Lilly Research Laboratories. At his retirement he was clinical research fellow, an executive-director-level position. From 1994-97, he was a part-time consultant to the Lilly diabetes research and diabetes care divisions. He continued to consult for pharmaceutical companies and other research institutions on diabetes research and treatment through 1997.

Galloway was also director of the diabetic clinic at Wishard, the principal primary care hospital in Indianapolis for indigent patients and for patients from the Veterans Administration Hospital in Indianapolis. He then served as a senior consultant to that unit, until December 1996.

== Memberships and affiliations ==
Galloway was a Fellow of the American College of Physicians, certified by the American Board of Internal Medicine, a member of the Massachusetts Medical Society, the Collier County Medical Society and the Florida Medical Association. A member of the American Diabetes Association, Galloway served two terms on its board of directors. In addition, he was a member of the Therapeutics Committee, chaired the Insurance Committee, and a Task Force for Third-Party Payment for Diabetes Education for the ADA.

He served as President of the Indianapolis Diabetes Association, 1973–1974, and was co-founder of the American Diabetes Association, Indiana Affiliate.

Galloway taught at Indiana University School of Medicine where he was named Professor of Medicine in 1980. He became Professor Emeritus on January 1, 1997.

== Publications ==
Galloway was the author or co-author of over 80 publications and 50 abstracts in the field of diabetes. He was also principal author and co-editor of the Eli Lilly publication, Diabetes Mellitus, Ninth Edition.

== Awards ==
- 2003 — Election to the Alpha of Nebraska Chapter of the Alpha Omega Alpha Honorary medical fraternity.
- 2000 — The International Diabetes Federation John A. Galloway Award and Lectureship established.
- 1998 — J.K. Lilly Award for Service to the Indiana Diabetes Association.
- 1982 — John H. Warvel Award for Service to the American Diabetes Association, Indiana Affiliate.
- 1982 — Research Award, University of Santiago, d’Compestella, Santiago, Spain.

== Patents ==
- RE Chance, BH Frank, JA Galloway: Pharmaceutical Formulations Comprising Human Insulin, Human C-Peptide, and Human Proinsulin, U.S. Patent No. 4,652,548, issued March 24, 1987
- RE Chance, BH Frank, JA Galloway: Pharmaceutical Formulation Comprising Human Insulin and Human Proinsulin, U.S. Patent No. 4,652,547, issued March 24, 1987
- RE Chance, BH Frank, JA Galloway, Human Proinsulin Pharmaceutical Formulations, U.S. Patent No. 4,654,324, issued March 31, 1987
- JA Galloway and JA Hoffmann: Glucagon-like Insulinotropic Peptide (“GLIP”), Composition and Methods, U.S. Patent No. 5,705,483, issued Jan. 6, 1998
