= Amelia R. Keller =

American activist and physician (1871–1943)

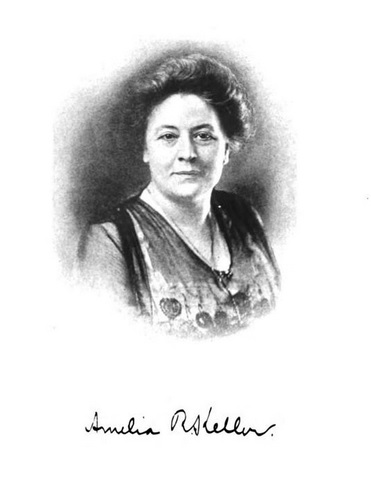
- Born: January 12, 1871; Cleveland, Ohio
- Died: January 28, 1943 (aged 72); Indianapolis, Indiana
- Burial place: Crown Hill Cemetery and Arboretum, Section 58, Lot 34; 39.8218447°N 86.1660387°W
- Education: Central College of Physicians and Surgeons (MD)
- Occupation: Physician

Amelia R. Keller (1871–1943) was an American early activist in the women's suffrage movement and was among the first woman physicians practicing in Indianapolis, Indiana. She was also one of the first women to teach at the Indiana University School of Medicine in 1908, and co-founded the Woman's Franchise League of Indiana in 1911.

== Early life and education ==
Amelia R. Keller was born in Cleveland, Ohio, on January 12, 1871, to parents Frederick Carl Keller and Elizabeth Ruemmele, both of whom had immigrated from Germany. The family came to Indianapolis when Keller was a young girl; she remained there for the rest of her life. She graduated from Indianapolis High School (later Shortridge High School).

== Career ==
=== Physician and teacher ===
In addition to a busy general practice specializing in pediatrics, Dr. Keller also lectured on social hygiene and child welfare. She joined the faculty of the School of Medicine of Purdue University in 1906. When the school was absorbed by the Indiana University School of Medicine in 1908, she became one of the first women to teach there and continued to serve as an associate professor of Pediatrics and diseases of children. She taught at the school from 1908 to 1919 and spoke often on public health matters. She also served as family physician to Indiana Governor James P. Goodrich.

=== Activism ===
Keller is well known for her prominent leadership for women's rights and suffrage. She championed equal pay for women and their entrance into public sectors such as business and law enforcement. Dr. Keller founded the forerunner of the Woman's Franchise League of Indiana; she would serve as its president from 1910 to 1917. Under her guidance, the League flourished and quickly became a statewide network of suffragists numbering in the thousands. The efforts of the Woman's Franchise League of Indiana, who appealed to lawmakers and spoke at street meetings, helped secure Indiana's 1920 ratification of the Nineteenth Amendment to the United States Constitution. Dr. Keller was also an editor of the Citizens League of Indiana's monthly magazine, The Citizen, in the suffrage department. She also served in a nonpolitical organization as the first president of the Woman's Rotary Club of Indianapolis, organized on April 28, 1919, where she led the group's effort to promote the business interest of all its members and provide financial assistance to women of non-traditional age seeking undergraduate or graduate degrees. After the 19th Amendment passed, Dr. Keller worked in the Republican Party and many women's organizations within it and made speeches for party candidates. She also continued her club work, serving as first Vice President of the Indiana Federation of Clubs and President of the Indianapolis Council of Women. She was active in Indiana politics until her death in 1943 and was buried in Crown Hill Cemetery in Indianapolis.
