= Robert William Schrier =

American medical researcher (1936–2021)

Robert William Schrier (1936 – January 23, 2021) was founding editor-in-chief of the magazine Nature Clinical Practice Nephrology. Schrier was formerly Chairman of the Department of Medicine at the University of Colorado School of Medicine for 26 years, and Head of the Division of Renal Diseases and Hypertension for 20 years. At the time of his death, he was Professor Emeritus at the University of Colorado School of Medicine. He died in Potomac, Maryland.

== Education ==
Schrier was born in Indianapolis, Indiana, where he graduated from Thomas Carr Howe High School in 1953; he then went to DePauw University where he received his bachelor's degree in 1957; and graduated with his MD in 1962 from Indiana University School of Medicine with Alpha Omega Alpha (AOA) honors. Residency in internal medicine at the University of Washington in Seattle. Fellowship at Harvard at the Peter Bent Brigham Hospital with George Thorn and David Lauler. He was a Fulbright Scholar (1957–58) and a Guggenheim Fellow (1986–87). Dr Schrier has been granted honorary degrees from DePauw University, the University of Colorado, the University of Silesia, and the Medical College of Ohio.

== Affiliations ==
Schrier was at various times President of the Association of American Physicians; the American Society of Nephrology; the National Kidney Foundation; and the International Society of Nephrology. Schrier was a Master of the American College of Physicians and an Honorary Fellow of the Royal College of Physicians. He was elected to the National Academy of Medicine (formerly Institute of Medicine) of the National Academy of Science.

== Scholarship ==
Schrier is the author of more than 1,000 scientific papers. He was the editor of Diseases of the Kidney and Urinary Tract, Renal and Electrolyte Disorders, Manual of Nephrology and Essential Atlas of Nephrology and Hypertension. His research contributions center on autosomal dominant polycystic kidney disease, and pathogenesis of acute fluid volume in cirrhosis. cardiac failure, nephrotic syndrome, and pregnancy.

== Awards ==
Schrier received awards from the American College of Physicians (John Phillips Award); the National Kidney Foundation (David Hume Award); the American Society of Nephrology (John Peters Award); the International Society of Nephrology (Jean Hamburger Award); the German Society of Nephrology (Franz Vollhard Award); the Western Society of Clinical Investigation (Mayo Soley Award); the Association of Professors of Medicine (Robert H Williams Award); the American Kidney Fund (National Torchbearer Award); the Association of American Physicians (Francis Blake Award); the Acute Renal Failure Commission (Bywaters Award); the New York Academy of Medicine (The Edward N Gibbs Memorial Award); the University of Strasbourg (Pasteur Medal); as well as the Grand Hamdan International Award for Medical Sciences; and the Alexander von Humboldt Research Award for his contributions to biomedical research, education, and clinical medicine; Indianapolis Public Schools 2007 Hall of Fame inductee. DePauw University Distinguished Alumni Award (1980), Silver Anniversary Achievement Award (1982), and Distinguished Alumnae Award for Profession Achievement (2001). Indiana University School of Medicine Distinguished Alumnus Award (2002). The American Heart Association awarded him the Eugene Braunwald Academic Mentorship Award in 2012.

== Sports ==
At DePauw University he was three times all Conference (Butler, Valparaiso, Indiana State, Ball State, and Evansville) in both basketball and baseball. His four-year 20 points/game conference average in basketball stood for 30 years and still stands at DePauw. Schrier was elected to the DePauw University Athletic Hall of Fame (1986) and the Indiana Basketball Hall of Fame in 2004.

== Other publications ==
Schrier published the book Profiles of American Presidents in the Twentieth Century: Merits and Maladies in 2011. The illnesses of seventeen United States Presidents in the twentieth century are analyzed and described accordingly to the periods of their administration. In 2012 he published, Moral Courage: Abraham Lincoln, Mahatma Gandhi, Nelson Mandela, and Martin Luther King, Jr. about these four freedom fighters whose common enemy was injustice and inequality. In 2014, he published Life's Lessons Learned: My Memoir.
