= Henry Feffer =

American surgeon

- Born: Henry Leon Feffer; January 15, 1918; New York, U.S.
- Died: May 9, 2011 (aged 93); Bethesda, Maryland, U.S.
- Education: Indiana University; Indiana University School of Medicine
- Spouse(s): Jean Kaplan Feffer (m.?-1964) (her death) (3 children); Daisy Berkes Feffer (m.?-2001) (her death) (2 children)
- Scientific career
- Fields: Medicine, surgeon, spine, orthopedic surgeon, hydrocortisone, back pain, neurosurgeon
- Workplaces: George Washington University Medical School; CARE; The Gallinger Municipal Hospital in Washington, D.C. which later became, the now defunct, District of Columbia General Hospital; United States Army; Howard University College of Medicine; National Zoo

Henry Leon Feffer (January 15, 1918 – May 9, 2011) of Bethesda, Maryland, was an American neurosurgeon. In the mid-1950s, he was one of the first medical doctors to systematically test whether low-back pain could be relieved with epidural injections of hydrocortisone. Today, physicians routinely give such injections before resorting to more invasive surgery. He was a Washington, D.C. spinal surgeon for more than four decades whose patients included Saddam Hussein.

== Early life and childhood ==
Feffer was born on January 15, 1918, in New York City.

== Education ==
Feffer graduated from Indiana University, and from the Indiana University School of Medicine. His orthopedic surgery internship was in The Gallinger Municipal Hospital in Washington, D.C. which later became, the now defunct, District of Columbia General Hospital.

== Career ==
Feffer was an emeritus professor at George Washington University Medical School.

== Death ==
Feffer died on May 9, 2011, of congestive heart failure at the age of 93.
