= Emerson Hall (Indiana University) =

- Interactive map of the Emerson Hall area
- Former names: Indiana University Medical Building

General information
- Architectural style: Classical Revival
- Location: 545 N Barnhill Dr., Indianapolis, IN 46202-5124
- Coordinates: 39°46′32.516″N 86°10′41.257″W
- Named for: Charles Philips Emerson
- Completed: 1919
- Affiliation: Indiana University-Purdue University Indianapolis

Design and construction
- Architect: Robert Frost Daggett

Emerson Hall was the first building constructed on the IU Medical Center campus as part of the Indiana University School of Medicine. The construction of the building marked the beginning of the presence of IU in Indianapolis and the growth of Indiana medical education. The building is located in between the University Hospital Cancer Pavilion to its south and the Van Nuys Medical Science Building to its north, and across from Willis D. Gatch Hall to its west.

== History ==
The predecessor to Emerson Hall, previously known as the Indiana University Medical School Building, was the Indiana Medical College. In 1916, the Indiana Medical College suffered severe water damage that resulted in a large portion of the space unusable. The old Indiana Medical College building was in dire need of repair, and it was decided to replace the building with a larger facility. Following the United States entry into World War I in 1917, Indiana University trustees approached Governor James P. Goodrich to create a new medical training school in Indianapolis. The new building would become to be known as the Indiana University Medical Building and replace the Indiana Medical College.

The Indiana University Medical Building was completed in 1919 and designed by Robert Frost Daggett. The new building “was four stories high and contained three laboratories, research rooms, and three lecture rooms that were large enough for a hundred students.” In 1928, a rear T-Wing was added to include a library, additional office space, and an auditorium. A new central laboratory was constructed in the basement of the south wing to consolidate the many small departmental labs into a single location.

By 1950, the Medical Building exceeded the capacity of students it could support and required renovation to meet the growing number of students. The Medical School Building housed the Department of Microbiology classes until the completion of the Medical Science Building in 1958.In 1961, the Indiana University Medical Building was renovated and renamed Emerson Hall. In 1964, a small laboratory exploded on the 4th floor of Emerson Hall which caused an estimated $35,000 worth of damages. The immediate cause was unknown but suspected to be leaking chemical fumes. In 1985, Bledsoe and Associates Inc. were awarded $785,900 to renovate Emerson Hall by completely redoing the fifth floor and adding six labs, operating rooms, and offices. The Blackmore and Buckner Roofing Company Inc. were awarded $97,500 to put a new roof on the building.

Throughout the 2000s, Emerson Hall underwent several renovations to create a more modern medical education building to meet the needs of a growing medical student population. In 2001, the Odle McGuire & Shook Corporation renovated the 3rd Floor West Office Suit of Emerson Hall. In 2003, MSKTD & Associates, Inc. renovated the 2nd floor. In 2004, Meridian Engineering Group, Inc. renovated the Emerson Hall Auditorium. In 2007, the fifth floor was renovated by arcDesign to create offices for surgery faculty and support staff. A marker was erected by IUPUI outside the building in 2007 to commemorate its history and impact on the development of the IU Medical Center.

== Namesake ==
Emerson Hall was named in honor of Charles Philips Emerson, former dean of the IU School of Medicine (IUSM). In 1911, Emerson was appointed as dean of the School of Medicine, which he held until 1932. He was heavily involved in the early development of the IUSM Medical Center, which included the Robert W. Long Hospital, the Rily Hospital for Children, the William H. Coleman Hospital, the Ball Residence for Nurses, and the Medical School Building.

== See also ==
- Indiana University–Purdue University Indianapolis Public Art Collection
