= Emily Erbelding =

American physician and scientist

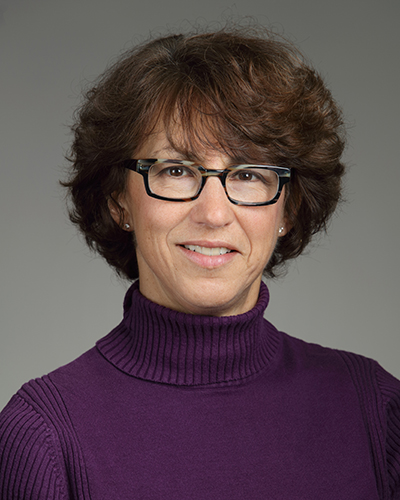
- Born: 1961 (age 64–65)
- Education: Cornell University (BA, MS); Indiana University, Indianapolis (MD); Johns Hopkins University (MPH)
- Scientific career
- Fields: Infectious diseases
- Workplaces: Johns Hopkins School of Medicine; National Institute of Allergy and Infectious Diseases

Emily J. Erbelding (born 1961) is an American physician-scientist. She was the director of the Division of Microbiology and Infectious Diseases at the National Institute of Allergy and Infectious Diseases (NIAID). Erbelding was previously a deputy director of the Division of AIDS at NIAID. She was a faculty member at Johns Hopkins School of Medicine and served as a director of clinical services for the Baltimore City Health Department STD/HIV program.

== Education ==
Erbelding graduated cum laude from Cornell University, where she also received a master of science degree. Her 1985 master's thesis was titled Glutamine metabolism in the small intestine. She earned her medical degree from Indiana University School of Medicine and completed her residency in internal medicine at Northwestern University Medical Center, serving as chief medical resident. While completing a fellowship in infectious diseases at the Johns Hopkins Hospital, she also earned a Master of Public Health degree with a concentration in epidemiology from the Johns Hopkins Bloomberg School of Public Health.

== Career ==
Erbelding spent 14 years on the faculty of the Johns Hopkins School of Medicine, in the division of infectious diseases, and was the director of clinical services for the Baltimore City Health Department STD/HIV program.

Erbelding served as deputy director of the Division of AIDS at the National Institute of Allergy and Infectious Diseases (NIAID). There she was involved in all aspects of scientific program management and support, helping to design and implement new initiatives involving basic, translational and clinical research and administering complex extramural grant programs and research infrastructure.

In 2017, Erbelding became director of the NIAID Division of Microbiology and Infectious Diseases (DMID). She is responsible for the strategic and scientific vision for DMID's complex national and international research program. DMID supports basic, preclinical, and clinical investigations into the causes, diagnosis, treatment, and prevention of a broad range of pathogens, including those related to biodefense and emerging infectious diseases. As of April 1, 2025, Erbelding was placed on administrative leave by the Department of Health and Human Services.

Erbelding serves on the acute flaccid myelitis task force at the Centers for Disease Control and Prevention.
