= William H. Coleman Hall =

Academic building in Indianapolis, Indiana, US

Coleman Hall
- Former names: William H. Coleman Hospital

General information
- Architectural style: Federal Architecture
- Location: 1140 W Michigan St, Indianapolis, IN 46202-5118
- Coordinates: 39°46′31.299″N 86°10′50.127″W
- Completed: 1927
- Affiliation: Indiana University-Purdue University Indianapolis

Design and construction
- Architect: Robert Frost Daggett

Coleman Hall, previously known as the William H. Coleman Hospital for Women, served as one of the early medical facilities on the IU Medical Center for medical students attending the Indiana University School of Medicine. Coleman Hospital specialized in women's health with early advances in obstetrics and gynecology for medical education in Indianapolis, while providing Indianapolis residents specialized care. Coleman Hall transitioned from a healthcare institution to an academic center, furthering the School of Medicine's objective of providing quality medical education. Coleman Hall is located on the western side of the IUPUI campus with many other early medical facilities including Robert W. Long Hall, Fesler Hall, Willis D. Gatch Hall, Emerson Hall, and some newer structures like the Eugene and Marilyn Glick Eye Institute.

== History ==
=== William H. Coleman Hospital ===
Coleman Hall was constructed in 1927 and designed by Robert Frost Daggett as the William H. Coleman Hospital for Women. The construction of Coleman Hospital was made possible by philanthropic support from the Indiana state legislature. Coleman Hospital was the third hospital constructed for the Indiana University Medical Center and was dedicated for obstetrics services. Reluctance over obstetrics care in the 1920s stemmed from ongoing conversations regarding to social concerns about reproduction. Long Hospital had a small obstetrics department, but a growth in demand during the early 1920s for specialized maternal care led to the need for a larger obstetrics facility.

In 1924, William H. Coleman donated $250,000 for the construction a healthcare facility dedicated to maternal health and obstetrics in memory of his stepdaughter, Suemma Coleman Atkins. Indiana University was selected so the new Coleman Hospital could function as a teaching hospital and train future obstetrics professionals. In 1926, Coleman gave Indiana University property space and funding to begin the construction of the hospital. The Coleman Hospital for Women was officially dedicated on October 20, 1927. In 1934, Willis Dew Gatch, Dean of the Indiana University School of Medicine, approved the usage of money to repair the infrastructure of Coleman Hospital.

=== Coleman Hall ===
In 1973, the Coleman Hospital was officially shuttered and transitioned to an academic space for the Indiana University School of Medicine due to the completion of the new Indiana University Health University Hospital. In April 1978, the Indiana General Assembly approved $1.2 million in funding for the repair and rehabilitation of Coleman Hospital. In 1979, the obstetrics and gynecology services moved to the new University Hospital, and the Coleman building was adapted to accommodate the School of Allied Health. In 1981, Indiana University officially changed the name of William H. Coleman Hospital to Coleman Hall.

In 2004, Coleman Hall was renovated by Mussett, Nicholas & Associates, Inc. In 2007, Indiana University erected a historic marker outside Coleman Hall to commemorate its impact on the history of Indianapolis healthcare, women's healthcare, and its contribution to the IU School of Medicine.

== See also ==
- Indiana University–Purdue University Indianapolis Public Art Collection
- List of hospitals in Indianapolis § Defunct
