= Chemico-Biological Interactions =

- Discipline: Toxicology
- Language: English
- Edited by: Daniel R. Dietrich

Publication details
- History: 1969-present
- Publisher: Elsevier
- Impact factor: 5.192 (2020)

Standard abbreviations
- ISO 4: Chem.-Biol. Interact.

Indexing
- ISSN: 0009-2797 (print); 1872-7786 (web)

Links
- Journal homepage

Chemico-Biological Interactions is a peer-reviewed scientific journal covering toxicological aspects of interactions between chemicals and biological systems.
