= Willis D. Gatch Hall =

- Former names: Clinical Building

General information
- Architectural style: Art Deco
- Location: 1120 W Michigan St, Indianapolis, IN 46202-5111
- Coordinates: 39°46′32.440″N 86°10′45.102″W
- Named for: Willis D. Gatch
- Completed: 1938
- Affiliation: Indiana University-Purdue University Indianapolis

Design and construction
- Architect: Robert Frost Daggett

Willis D. Gatch Hall, shortened to Gatch Hall, was constructed as an addition for the former Robert W. Long Hospital. Gatch Hall served as additional space for outpatient services, clinical services, and imaging services. Following the construction of University Hospital and the reorganization of medical services at the IU Medical Center, Gatch Hall would transition to an academic center supporting the School of Allied Health, Division of Nuclear Medicine, and Department of Radiology. The building continues to serve as an academic center for various divisions and departments within the IU School of Medicine. Gatch Hall was one of the early buildings on the IU Medical Center alongside Fesler Hall, Emerson Hall, and Coleman Hall. The Eugene and Marilyn Glick Eye Institute and the School of Nursing Building are more recent additions to the IU Medical Center cluster.

== History ==
Gatch Hall, also known as the Clinical Building, was constructed in 1938 and designed by Robert Frost Daggett. The building was constructed as a large addition on the north side of Long Hospital. The construction of Gatch Hall was funded by the Public Works Administration and initially served to support the operations of Long Hospital. The new building included six operating rooms, new space for occupational and physical therapy, and patient space. The new building created new space for departments from Long, Coleman, and Riley Hospital. The cancer clinic moved to the new building and began providing X-ray and radiation treatment for cancer patients. The clinical building allowed the IU School of Medicine to further centralize their facilities in Indianapolis while relieving the strain of clinical operation for the IU Medical Center. The top floor provided rooms to house interns and residents for the School of Medicine.

In 1949, an addition was completed to create more space for the Department of Radiology. The top floor of Gatch Hall was used for resident housing until 1953 when the Student Union Building opened next to Ball Residence Hall. The Union building provided 80 single rooms for residents and guests, and a 1958 addition created another 121 rooms for students.

Following the completion of the Medical Science Building in 1958, the autopsy room was relocated to the first floor of the new building. Previously, autopsies were performed at the clinical building for Long Hospital, Coleman Hospital, and Riley Hospital. The organs were sent to Fesler Hall, known as the Laboratory Sciences Building at the time, for further examination.

In 1972, the Student-Employee Health Service was opened on the ground floor of the Clinical Building to provide all university employees with healthcare opportunities. Prior to this, only university medical employees were eligible for healthcare. The Division of Nuclear Medicine, referred to as "radiopharmaceuticals, was created and housed in the basement of the Clinical Building. This included the establishment of a new radioisotope laboratory in the basement of the building. This location would be short-lived as the majority of radiology equipment would be moved to University Hospital in 1976. Prior to the official creation of a nuclear medicine division, the Clinical Building still housed various equipment used for radiology at Robert W. Long Hospital. University Hospital would send patients via the underground tunnel for radiological treatment, including the usage of gamma cameras. Similarly, Riley Children's Hospital and William H. Coleman Hospital would send patients for any imaging work that was needed.

In the mid-1990s, the radiology space in the basement of the Clinical Building was redesigned to accommodate more modern academic needs. Before this, the vast majority of the space was still reminiscent of its original purposes. The space contained its original fluoroscopy rooms with lead-lined walls. The space was renovated to house the offices of the Radiologic Sciences Programs. The expansion led to the relocation of the Department of Radiology to the Clinical Building with a renovation that created a large classroom and a two-room X-ray teaching laboratory, a conference room, a library, faculty offices, and support area. The relocation of the Imaging Sciences Division to the Cancer Research Institute II in the early 2000s created more open space for Radiology education.

In 2009, the laboratory space on the west side of the third floor was converted into administrative offices. The rest of the third floor was renovated with updated restrooms and a conference space dedicated for the Division of Rheumatology. On June 7, 2010, the Clinical Building was renamed Willis D. Gatch Hall.

== Namesake ==
Gatch Hall was renamed after Dr. Willis D. Gatch, former dean of the School of Medicine (1932–1946). In 1909, when he worked as chief of surgery, Gatch invented the adjustable hospital bed, now known as the "Gatch Bed", which elevates a patient's head or feet by way of a crank. Following his retirement as dean, Gatch established a private practice and research laboratory for the study of surgical shock.

== See also ==
- Indiana University–Purdue University Indianapolis Public Art Collection
