= Indiana University School of Medicine =

Public medical school in Indiana, US

- Motto: Preparing healers. Transforming health.
- Type: Public medical school system
- Established: May 1903; 123 years ago
- Parent institution: Indiana University
- Accreditation: LCME
- Dean: Scott D. Boden
- Faculty: 3,568 full-time and 326 part-time (2024)
- Administrative staff: 2,558 (2024)
- Students: 1,448 MD (2024)
- Undergraduates: 236 BS (2024)
- Postgraduates: 176 MS (2024)
- Doctoral students: 191 PhD (2024)
- Other students: 1,438 Residents & Fellows (2024)
- Location: Indianapolis (primary, and an additional eight regional campuses throughout the state), Indiana, United States; 39°46′32″N 86°10′36″W
- Campus: Urban to suburban
- Absorbed: The Indiana Medical College, the School of Medicine of Purdue University (1908); State College of Physicians and Surgeons (1908)
- Average accepted MCAT: 512 (2024)
- Average accepted undergraduate GPA: 3.85 (2024)
- Acceptance rate: 5.74% (2024)
- Website: medicine.iu.edu
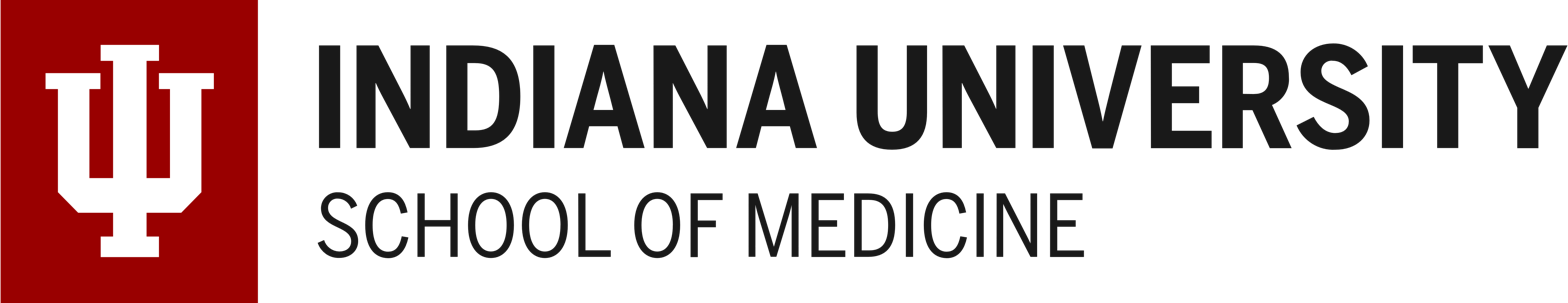

The Indiana University School of Medicine (IUSM) is a major, multi-campus medical school located in Indianapolis, Indiana, United States. It also has additional campuses throughout the U.S. state of Indiana and is both the undergraduate and graduate medical school of Indiana University. There are nine campuses throughout the state; the principal research, educational, and medical center is located on the campus of Indiana University Indianapolis. With 1,448 MD students, 191 PhD students, and 1,438 residents and fellows in the 2024–25 academic year, IUSM is the largest medical school in the United States. The school offers many joint degree programs, including an MD/PhD Medical Scientist Training Program. It has partnerships with Purdue University's Weldon School of Biomedical Engineering, other Indiana University system schools, and various in-state external institutions. It is the medical school with the largest number of graduates licensed in the United States per a 2018 Federation of State Medical Boards survey with 11,828 licensed physicians.

The school has pioneered research in multiple specialties, including oncology, immunology, substance use, neuroscience, and endocrinology. Research discoveries include a curative therapy for testicular cancer, the development of echocardiography, the identification of several genes linked to Alzheimer's disease, and the creation of inner ear sensory cells from pluripotent stem cells.

In the 2023 U.S. News & World Report rankings of the best graduate schools for medicine, the school ranked 23rd in the nation for primary care and 41st for research out of 192 medical schools. In the U.S. News & World Report rankings of the best hospitals, the Indiana University Health Medical Center had seventeen nationally ranked clinical programs. The Riley Hospital for Children at Indiana University Health is nationally ranked in 9 of 10 designated specialties for children in the U.S. News & World Report. The IU School of Medicine is also home to the Melvin and Bren Simon Comprehensive Cancer Center, a National Cancer Institute-designated Comprehensive Cancer Center. In federal fiscal year 2023, IUSM ranked 29th for National Institutes of Health funding among all U.S. medical schools (13th among all public U.S. medical schools) with $243,608,100 of funding.

It was the only medical school in the state from when the Valparaiso University School of Medicine closed in 1917 to when the Tom and Julie Wood College of Osteopathic Medicine at Marian University opened in 2010. IUSM remains the state's only allopathic, MD degree-granting school.

The average MCAT score needed to be accepted into the IU School of Medicine in 2015 was 512, which is slightly higher than the national average, or roughly 506.5. The same year, the lowest score accepted was 497, while the highest score accepted by the school was 527.

== History ==
Indiana University (IU) established a department of medicine at Bloomington in 1903, but the school in Indianapolis traces its founding to 1908, following the resolution of a rivalry with Purdue University over which institution had the legal authority to establish a medical school in Marion County. A year after the IU- and Purdue-affiliated schools in Indianapolis were consolidated in 1908, the Indiana General Assembly authorized IU to operate a medical school in Marion County.

=== Founding in Bloomington ===
In March 1903, William Lowe Bryan, the tenth president of IU, proposed the formation of a department of medicine at IU Bloomington to the university trustees. The new department was approved and established in May of the same year. The IU School of Medicine was admitted as a member of the Association of American Medical Colleges (AAMC) in 1904.

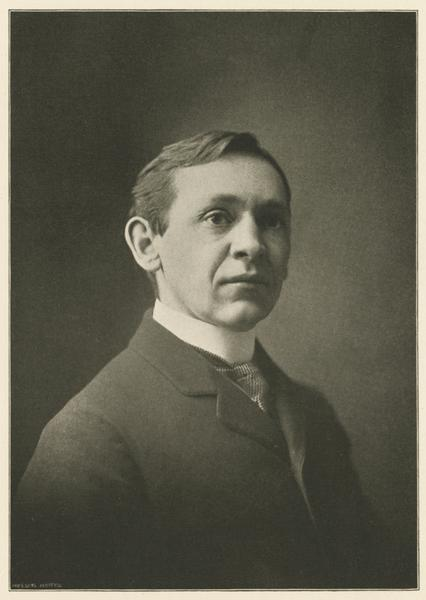
William Lowe Bryan, c. 1898

In addition to IUSM in Bloomington, IU's leaders wanted to locate medical training facilities in Indianapolis. Their initial plan was to provide medical students with the first two years of coursework at Bloomington and the final two years at Indianapolis, where students would receive clinically based training as part of their studies. Prior to 1908, due primarily to the high cost of establishing its own medical facilities in Indianapolis, IU attempted to merge with existing medical schools, but the effort was unsuccessful.

=== Earlier schools ===
The current school in Indianapolis is a mixture of many earlier medical colleges. The 19th and early 20th centuries saw many short-lived medical schools established in Indiana, mostly in Indianapolis, with the majority lasting less than a decade. This is mostly attributable to financial reasons and because most of medical education at this time was taught through an apprenticeship system and through private, for-profit schools. University-based schools with access to state funding and endowments became the standard model for medical education later on in the 1890s, with Johns Hopkins University leading the way.

The first Indiana school was established in 1833 as the Christian College at New Albany. It was largely regarded as a fraudulent diploma mill, and offered courses, but not degrees, in medicine. It closed the same year. The first public medical school, Vincennes University's department of medicine, was short lived as well, only lasting 1837–1838. Many other schools of varying quality and regard would open and close throughout the next 70 years.

The first successful school was the private LaPorte University School of Medicine (LPSM) founded in 1841. The first proprietary school was the Indiana Central Medical College (ICMC) founded in Indianapolis in 1849; it served as the medical department of Indiana Asbury University, today known as DePauw University. John Stough Bobbs, a pioneer local physician, served as the ICMC's dean. LPSM was renamed to the Indiana Medical College in 1846 and would ultimately merge into the ICMC in 1851; the ICMC would itself close in 1852.

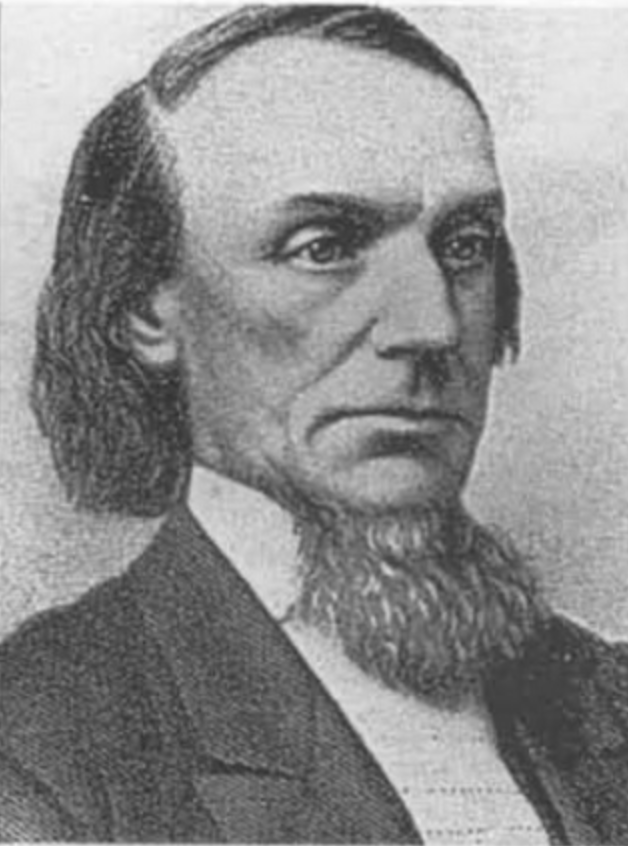
John S. Bobbs, c. 1870

In 1869, another school, also named the Indiana Medical College (IMC), was launched by Bobbs and colleagues as an outgrowth of the Indianapolis Academy of Medicine. Initial classes were held in the Old Indiana Statehouse; as the building was actively falling apart around this time, classes were soon moved to a building at the northwest corner of Delaware and Court streets. Clinical classes were taught at the Indianapolis City Hospital and various other hospitals and clinics around the city. The IMC would associate with IU in 1871; though the partnership ended in 1876 when IU failed to receive state funding for medical instruction. The Doctor of Medicine program at the IMC was not particularly rigorous, and one could graduate after only five months of study. However, graduates still required years of apprenticeship post-graduation, equivalent to a modern-day medical residency.

Samuel A. Elbert, the first African American to receive a medical degree in Indiana, graduated from the IMC in 1871 following a dispute with the college.

In 1874, the College of Physicians and Surgeons opened in Indianapolis as a breakaway school from the Indiana Medical College following a dispute over admissions policies; the schools reunited as the Medical College of Indiana (MCI) and associated with Butler University in 1878. The MCI's building was located at the northeast corner of South Pennsylvania and East Maryland streets; it was destroyed by a fire in 1894. Following a bequest by physician William Lomax (a graduate of LPSM), a new medical education building named in Lomax's honor was constructed in 1895 at 212 North Senate Ave. It was razed in 1960 for the construction of the Indiana Government Center North, surviving both extensive water damage in 1916 and fire damage in 1919.

Two more medical schools opened in 1879: the Indianapolis-based Central College of Physicians and Surgeons (CCPS) and the Fort Wayne College of Medicine (FWCM). The CCPS was founded by dissidents from the MCI unhappy with the association with Butler, and moved into a building at 214 North Senate Avenue, just up the road from the MCI. The FWCM briefly associated with Taylor University from 1890 to 1893.

In 1896, the MCI, Butler, and the Indiana Law School formed a loose collection of colleges named the University of Indianapolis (U of I), not related to the modern university of the same name. The Indiana Dental College joined U of I in 1904. Plans existed to create a central campus and expand the number of component colleges but they never materialized, and thus U of I remained an amorphous entity. Its component colleges gradually joined with IU over time with the exception of Butler, which remains independent to this day.

After IUSM was founded in 1903, formal negotiations opened between IU and the MCI for the MCI to leave U of I and join with IU; however, due to fundamental disagreements on where the resulting school of medicine would be located (the MCI wished it to remain in Indianapolis while IU wanted to move it to Bloomington), the proposal was not ratified, and by 1904 the matter was indefinitely abandoned.

=== Rivalry with Purdue University ===
While negotiations were ongoing between IU and the Medical College of Indiana, representatives from the Central College of Physicians and Surgeons approached Purdue University's medical department in West Lafayette, which had been established sometime prior to 1895, to arrange a similar union. The Purdue trustees declined the offer, not wanting to interfere with the concurrent negotiations between IU and the MCI. In May 1905, the MCI submitted the same proposal ("...to give its property and assets of an appraised value of $100,000 to the University, and to accompany the gift by its good will and the gratuitous services of its faculty; the motive being to permanently establish a medical college of high order in connection with an educational institution of good standing.") that had failed ratification with IU to Purdue's trustees. The trustees took the proposal into consideration, and were "convinced that the conditions were unusually favorable to the consummation of a union of interests where all previous efforts had failed, and to the inauguration of a progressive educational movement of great value to the State". By September the proposal was accepted subject to the approval of the state legislature, and the MCI became part of Purdue University with the full title of "the Indiana Medical College, the School of Medicine of Purdue University".

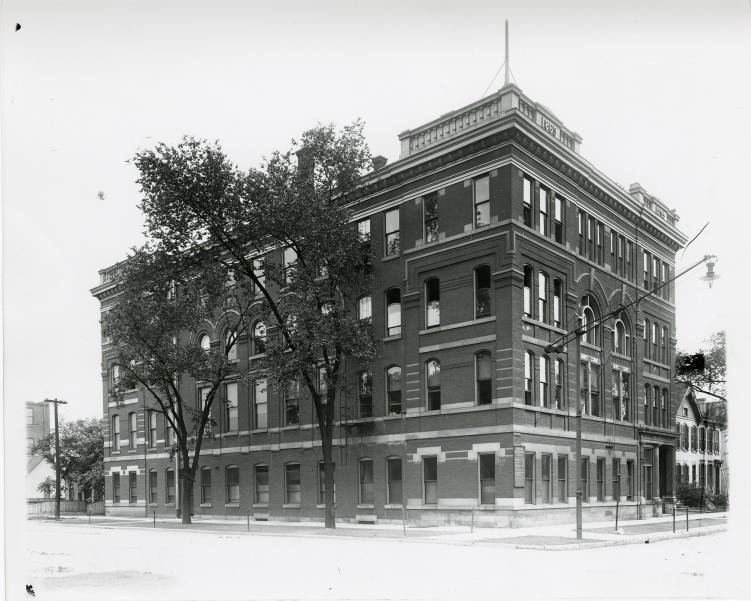
The Lomax Building, housing the Indiana Medical College, the School of Medicine of Purdue University, pictured in 1906

On September 25, 1905, the trustees of the CCPS voted to suspend operations and to transfer the students, alumni, personal property, and funds of the college to the Purdue School of Medicine. Later on October 2, the Fort Wayne College of Medicine voted to likewise merge with the Purdue School of Medicine and transfer personnel and equipment to Indianapolis. The Purdue School of Medicine operated out of the former MCI's facilities (the Lomax Building) at 212 North Senate Avenue in Indianapolis (the northwest corner of Market Street), in the immediate vicinity of the Indiana Statehouse. The building that housed the CCPS was sold. In May 1906, 122 students received medical degrees from Purdue University and successfully passed the examination of the State Board of Medical Registration. In the spring of 1907, Purdue graduated 68 men and four women; in that class was Arett C. Arnett, a physician who helped establish a Lafayette clinic in 1922 later known as Arnett Clinic and today known as Indiana University Health Arnett Hospital.

In 1906, the faculty of the Purdue School of Medicine published a resolution in the Indiana Medical Journal and the daily press stating that all graduates of the Medical College of Indiana, the Central College of Physicians and Surgeons, and the Fort Wayne College of Medicine were entitled to the degree of Doctor of Medicine and such diploma from Purdue University; that graduates of the former schools could receive these items upon application to Purdue; and the alumni records of the three former schools would thereafter be kept as the records of the Indiana Medical College, the School of Medicine of Purdue University. (Note: The full text of the resolution is as follows: "Resolved, that it be immediately published to all the graduates of the Medical College of Indiana, the Central College of Physicians and Surgeons and the Ft. Wayne College of Medicine, that by the union of the three schools to form the Indiana Medical College, the School of Medicine of Purdue University, each and every graduate of the united schools was entitled to the degree of doctor of medicine, and such diploma of Purdue University, and may receive such degree upon application to the proper authorities; and, further, that the Alumni records of the three schools will be kept hereafter as the records of the Indiana Medical College, the School of Medicine of Purdue University.") Immediately thereafter on April 3, 1906, alumni of the former CCPS passed a resolution rejecting the Indiana Medical College as their alma mater, and expressed support that "the only logical place for a State Medical Department" was with Indiana University.

The founding of the Purdue-controlled consolidated medical school in 1905 triggered a debate over which state university, IU or Purdue, had the legal authority to establish a state-supported, four-year medical school in Indianapolis. IU believed that under the legislative act that elevated Indiana College to a university on February 15, 1838, it had the sole authorization to provide state-supported instruction in medicine; but, the development of a medical school had been delayed due to a lack of sufficient funding. A legal opinion published by a W. H. H. Miller on October 31, 1905, stated that the university did not have clear authority to conduct a medical program outside Monroe County, as that legislative act only mentioned medical education "on the grounds of the university". The rivalry was so intense that it is sometimes labeled as the instigating factor for the cancellation of athletic events between the universities from 1906 to 1908; however, newspapers from the time cite a fight that occurred at a baseball game in West Lafayette on May 31, 1906, as the cause.

The building that was sold and had housed the former CCPS would eventually come under the ownership of IU supporters, who would establish a separate medical school, the State College of Physicians and Surgeons (SCPS), there in 1906. Clinical faculty were recruited from those unhappy with the arrangement with Purdue. This school offered clinical instructions to IU Bloomington's third- and fourth-year medical students. The SCPS enrolled 109 students in September 1906. In August 1907, the IU board of trustees agreed to a merger of the IU School of Medicine in Bloomington with the SCPS in Indianapolis but agreed to take financial responsibility only for the school's facilities in Monroe County. The first two years of training continued at Bloomington and the final two years of clinical training were held at the SCPS in Indianapolis, with a Doctor of Medicine degree conferred by Indiana University.

=== Incorporation of Purdue's school and move to Indianapolis ===
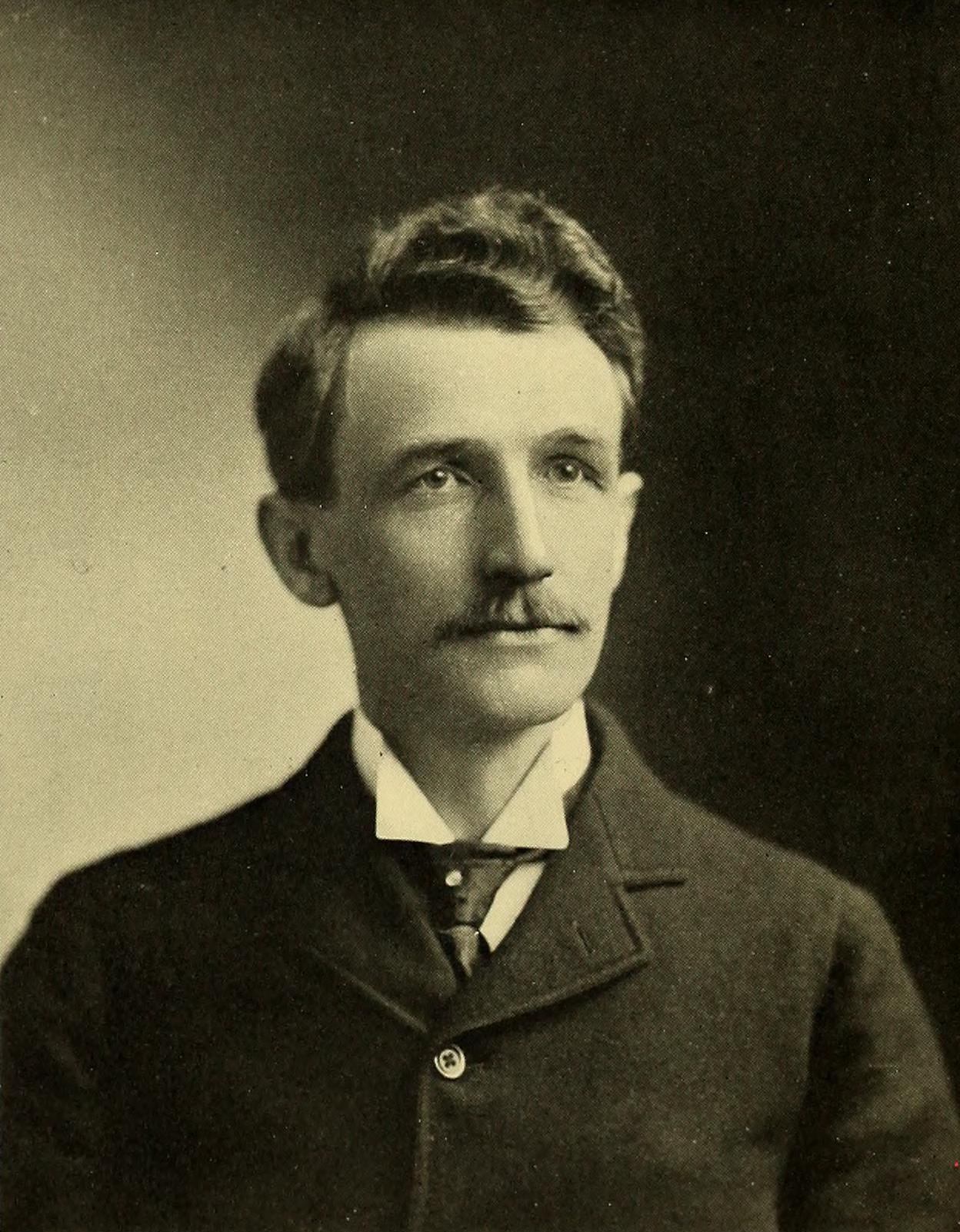
Winthrop E. Stone, 1902

To resolve their ongoing dispute, the leaders of IU and Purdue, along with each of their supporters, sought approval from the Indiana General Assembly to operate their own schools of medicine in Marion County, with the 1907 legislative session hearing proposals from both IU and Purdue to operate separate schools. Divided over competing loyalties to IU or Purdue (the state's largest public schools and historic rivals), legislators debated for months, with neither bill being passed. Eventually, Purdue's president, Winthrop E. Stone, relented and was hailed as a peacemaker, stating that Purdue should leave medical education to IU since it was not central to Purdue's mission as an agricultural and mechanical university and because the problem was so disruptive. In April 1908, IU and Purdue reached an agreement that incorporated the SCPS and the Purdue School of Medicine into the school of medicine in Bloomington and retained the name Indiana University School of Medicine. The agreement additionally stipulated that the school be governed by a board of directors consisting of representatives from IU, Purdue, and the Indiana State Medical Association. This shared governance came to an end on February 26, 1909, when the state legislature formally authorized IU to operate a medical school in Marion County and clearly mandated that IU assume total responsibility for the state's public medical school. The state legislature's authorization enabled IU's medical students to complete years two through four of their medical education in Indianapolis or remain in Bloomington for their first two years before transferring. Students still had to complete at least one year in Bloomington.

Following Indiana University's near-total consolidation of medical education in the state, only two proprietary schools remained, both of which would close in the following years (the Eclectic Medical College of Indiana, 1900–1908; and the Physiomedical College of Indiana, 1873–1909, which was held in high regard among contemporaries at the time). The final independent medical institution was the Valparaiso University School of Medicine (VUSM), founded in 1902 after VU's purchase of the Chicago-based American College of Medicine and Surgery, itself founded in 1901 as the Chicago Eclectic Medical College. Renamed as the Chicago College of Medicine & Surgery (CCM&S) in 1907, the CCM&S functioned as VUSM's physical facilities, clinical sites, and laboratories. In a similar arrangement to IUSM's Bloomington and Indianapolis campuses, VUSM allowed students to complete their preclinical studies in Valparaiso before transferring to the CCM&S in Chicago. After VU declared bankruptcy in 1917, the CCM&S was sold to Loyola University Chicago and would go on to become the Stritch School of Medicine. Thus, IUSM was left as the last school remaining after a tumultuous century of competition for medical education in Indiana.

=== Early leadership and enrollment ===
Dr. Allison Maxwell, who headed one of the former proprietary schools, agreed to serve as the first dean of the four-year IU School of Medicine in Indianapolis in April 1908; he remained as its dean until 1911. Maxwell led the fledgling school through a difficult time when financial budgets were an issue and the consolidation of IU's and Purdue's medical school faculties in Indianapolis and Bloomington was completed. The combined faculty would support the four-year medical school at Indianapolis and maintain the two-year, pre-clinical coursework at Bloomington. This arrangement continued until 1911, when only the first year of preclinical coursework would be taught in Bloomington. In addition to Maxwell, other leaders in IUSM's early history were drawn from Johns Hopkins University, including Charles P. Emerson, who was appointed as the second dean of IUSM in 1911 and served in that role until 1931.

Willis Dew Gatch became the third dean of the medical school in 1932. In 1909, Gatch invented the Gatch adjustable hospital bed, which used a crank to raise and lower the patient's head and feet. John D. VanNuys, a 1936 graduate of IUSM, became its fourth dean in 1947. Amelia R. Keller, department of pediatrics, was the sole woman on the clinical faculty of the IU Medical School in Indianapolis after the school's consolidation with the Purdue School of Medicine in 1908.

IUSM graduated its first class of twenty-seven students and conferred its first Doctor of Medicine degree in May 1907. The first graduation of the consolidated IU and Purdue schools of medicine took place the following year. IUSM's first black student, Clarence Lucas, graduated in 1908; the first woman graduate of the newly consolidated school, Lillian Mueller, did so in 1909.

=== The Flexner Report ===
Abraham Flexner, a renowned American educator whose work helped reform many medical schools, visited IUSM in November 1909. He noted in his later Flexner Report (1910): "The situation in the state [was], thanks to the intelligent attitude of the university, distinctly hopeful, though it will take time to work it fully."

Flexner also made a recommendation for the progress of the school: "In order to make the school attractive to highly qualified students, it will be necessary (1) to employ full-time men in the work of the first two years, (2) to strengthen the laboratory equipment, (3) greatly improve the organization and conduct of the clinical courses." The IU School of Medicine was one of few medical schools in the nation at the time to receive a positive evaluation from Flexner, primarily because of its strong emphasis on college preparatory coursework in the sciences prior to enrolling in medical school and its additional training in the basic sciences as part of its medical school curriculum.

=== Early and current facilities ===
In its early years in Indianapolis, IUSM utilized the SCPS facilities (themselves the former CCPS facilities), erected in 1902 and located at the corner of Market Street and Senate Avenue. After the consolidation of IUSM with the SCPS and the Purdue School of Medicine in 1908, the medical school used the former Purdue School of Medicine facilities (which were the former MCI's facilities) for about ten years while it secured financing to construct new medical school buildings. Several of the medical school's early buildings in Indianapolis were erected in the 1910s and 1920s on property that would eventually become the site of the IU Medical Center on the present-day IU Indianapolis campus.

In February 1912, IU acquired property on West Michigan Street, near the Indianapolis City Hospital (the modern-day Sidney & Lois Eskenazi Hospital), to erect the Robert W. Long Hospital. Construction on the new teaching hospital began in 1912. Although its cornerstone was laid on November 1, 1912, the Great Flood of 1913 delayed the building's opening until 1914. Long Hospital was dedicated on June 15, 1914, and admitted its first patients the following day. Also planned with the opening of Long Hospital was the creation of the IU Training School for Nurses. Originally a part of IUSM, it became its own school (the IU School of Nursing) in 1956. Emerson Hall, another early medical school building, was constructed about 200 feet (61 m) northeast of Long Hospital and completed in the fall of 1919 at a cost of $257,699. Long Hospital was considered for demolition in the 1950s and was ultimately replaced by University Hospital in 1970; the building remains in service to IU Health and IUSM as Long Hall.

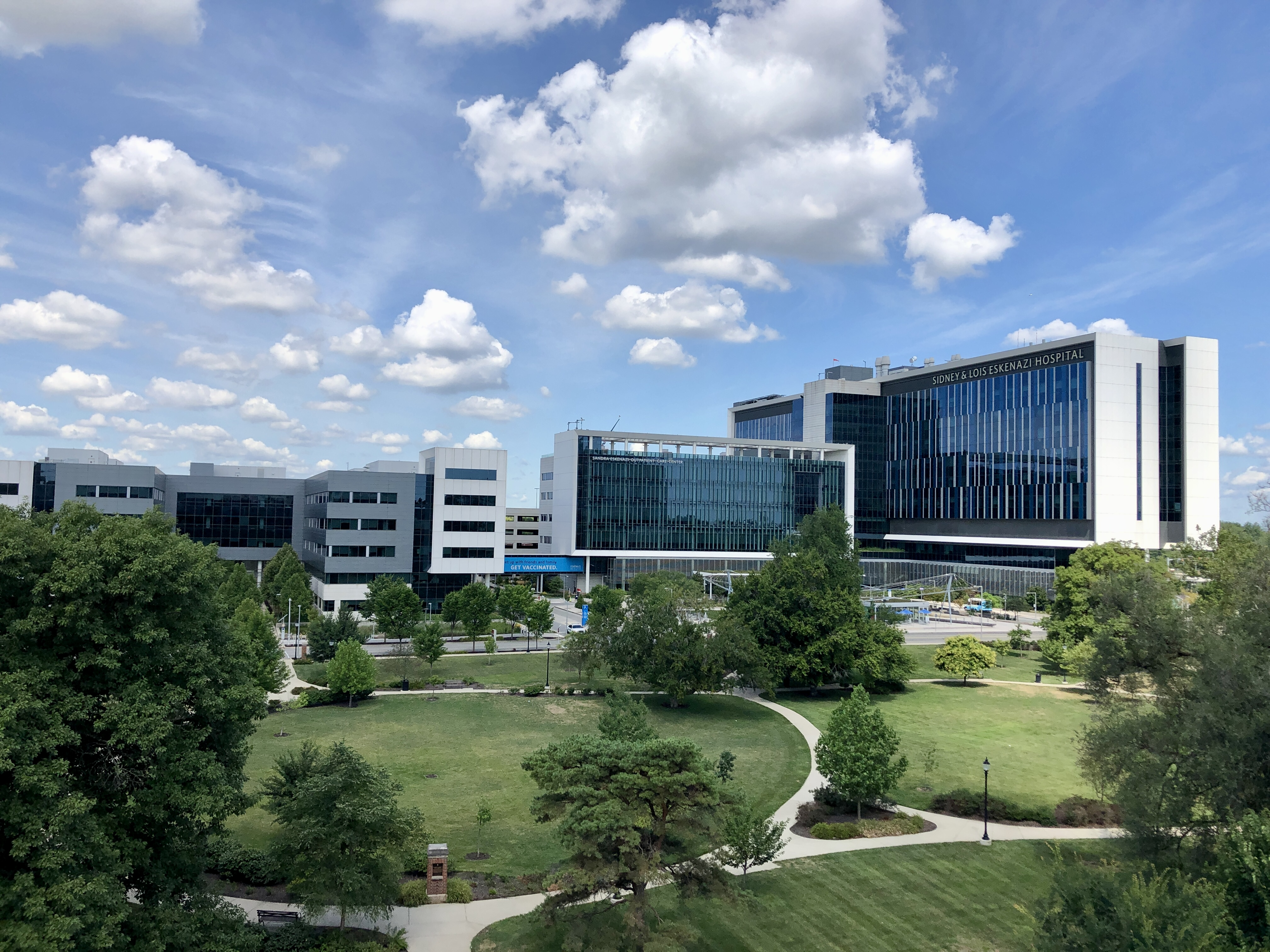
Eskenazi Hospital, July 2022

The cornerstone of the Riley Hospital for Children was laid on October 7, 1923, and dedicated on October 7, 1924. The hospital, named in honor of Hoosier poet James Whitcomb Riley, was erected north of Long Hospital. The James Whitcomb Riley Association (now known as the Riley Children's Foundation) hoped to raise an initial $250,000 in funding to add to the state's appropriation. By 1923 it had received $911,518 in pledges from more than 30,000 citizens, including $45,000 in donations from a mass fundraising event. Significant additions to the hospital were built over the years, including three in the 1930s: a Kiwanis Unit, dedicated in 1930; a Rotary Unit, dedicated in 1931; and a hydrotherapy pool in 1935.

Another of the medical school's early teaching hospitals was the William H. Coleman Hospital for Women. Erected west of Long Hospital and dedicated on October 20, 1927, Coleman Hospital's total cost was about $300,000. Other early buildings erected on the medical school campus in Indianapolis included the Ball Residence for Nurses, dedicated on October 7, 1928; and Fesler Hall, built in 1939. Long Hospital received the addition of Willis D. Gatch Hall in 1938. Myers Hall was built in Bloomington in 1937 for the medical students there. The school's medical research building was expanded in 1947 with a five-year grant from the Riley Children's Foundation. The Van Nuys Medical Science Building opened in Indianapolis in 1958. The nearby Ruth Lilly Medical Library building opened in 1989.

=== Expansion ===
Following the opening of Van Nuys, all medical instruction was moved to Indianapolis. Due to a projected shortage of American physicians in the early 1960s, some state politicians called for a second medical school. Rather than face competition, IU proposed the creation of a statewide medical school system under its control. IUSM ceased its consolidatory efforts in Indianapolis and instead looked for partners throughout the state to expand medical education; the first two years of medical education resumed at Bloomington as well. In 1968, IUSM found its first partners: the University of Notre Dame in South Bend and its old rival, Purdue in West Lafayette. Pilot programs were established at each campus, and about a dozen students at both Notre Dame and Purdue were allowed to complete the first two years at their regional campuses before transferring to Indianapolis. In 1971, the state legislature accepted IU's proposal and established a statewide system for medical education, and five other first-year training sites were added throughout the state by 1981 at IU Northwest in Gary, Indiana University–Purdue University Fort Wayne, (Note: IPFW split into two separate institutions on July 1, 2018. The school's academic programs in health sciences were taken over by Indiana University under the identity of Indiana University Fort Wayne. The athletic program and all other academic programs were assumed by the Purdue University system as Purdue University Fort Wayne.) Ball State University in Muncie, Indiana State University in Terre Haute, and at a joint venture of the University of Evansville and the Evansville campus of Indiana State. (Note: ISU-E became the University of Southern Indiana on April 16, 1985, when it was granted autonomy by the state legislature.) By 1990 all regional campuses were able to provide the first two years of education before transfer to Indianapolis (prior to this only Bloomington, South Bend, and West Lafayette provided the first two years). Faced with another call for more physicians in the early 2000s, all campuses offered full four-year programs by 2014, allowing students to complete their degrees at a regional campus without transfer to Indianapolis.

In 2009, IUSM and IU Health opened Fairbanks Hall along the Indiana Central Canal, a six-story office and clinical studies building. Nearby is IU Health's Goodman Hall neuroscience center, which opened in 2012, that houses IUSM's Stark Neurosciences Research Institute.

On October 19, 2022, IUSM broke ground to create a new, $230 million medical education and research building in Indianapolis expected to open November 2024. It will be connected via a skybridge to IU Health's new $4.3 billion flagship facility, a consolidation of University and Methodist hospitals, that itself is planned to open in 2027.

=== Leadership ===
Dr. Jay Hess served as Dean for a decade, beginning in 2013, and will step down in July 2026. Hess will be replaced by orthopedic surgeon-scientist Dr. Scott Boden.

== Curriculum ==
In 2003, it was one of ten medical schools nationwide chosen by the American Medical Association to develop new methods of teaching professionalism to doctors. To ensure that its educational process more accurately reflected its commitment to graduating caring and competent physicians, the Indiana University School of Medicine initiated a competency curriculum in 1999. To support the values expressed in the competency-based curriculum, the IU School of Medicine simultaneously implemented a school-wide "relationship-centered care initiative" to address its informal curriculum.

In 2016, IUSM implemented a new curriculum to prepare students to meet the challenges of a complex, ever-evolving healthcare environment. The new curriculum prepares students to practice medicine in a team-based interdisciplinary setting. It also allows students who decide to permanently leave the MD program to apply for the Master of Science in Medical Science degree, provided they have completed all requirements of Phase 1 (years 1 and 2) of their medical education.

=== Combined degree programs ===
IUSM offers many combined degree programs: an MD/PhD, an MD/MBA in a partnership with the IU Kelley School of Business, an MD/MPH in a partnership with the IU Fairbanks School of Public Health, an MD/MS or MD/MA through various IU schools, an MD/MS BME in a partnership with Purdue University's Weldon School of Biomedical Engineering, and an MD/JD in a partnership with the IU McKinney School of Law. The MD/PhD program, which offers full tuition and a stipend to students, is one of many programs to be designated a Medical Scientist Training Program by the National Institutes of Health. IUSM also offers certificates in various fields.

IUSM also offers baccalaureate to MD (B/MD) programs at the Muncie, Terre Haute, and Evansville campuses; the programs are only available to Hoosiers. Upon successful completion of an undergraduate degree and meeting other academic and testing requirements, students of a B/MD program at Ball State University (Muncie), Indiana State University (Terre Haute), or the University of Evansville, the University of Southern Indiana, or Indiana University Southeast (all for Evansville) will matriculate directly into IUSM at their home campus.

Beginning in the fall of 2024, IUSM will offer a "pathway to medicine" program at the new IU Indianapolis campus. The program is partly the result of IU's takeover of the Purdue University School of Science at IUPUI, which allowed for more administrative integration of the school than was previously possible. Seven- and eight-year programs will exist; eligible freshmen admitted into the school of science at the new IU Indianapolis will have direct acceptance into IUSM provided they meet and continue to meet the rigorous program requirements.

=== Scholarly Concentration Program ===
The Scholarly Concentration Program is an optional experience that complements a student's core medical curriculum. Students may research topics of personal interest, complete a scholarly project, and submit a manuscript for publication along with a poster presentation of their project. Projects are traditionally begun in the first year, with presentation and publication by the end of year four. Each campus hosts one to four topics that leverage the expertise of that particular campus.

The following are the concentration topics available at each campus:

Campus	Topic(s)
Statewide	Business of Medicine; Public Health; Religion and Spirituality in Medicine
Bloomington	Human Sexuality and Health; Medical Education
Evansville	Quality and Innovation in Health Care
Fort Wayne	Health Integration and Healthy Aging
Indianapolis	Biomedical Research; Genetics in Medicine; Health Information Technology; Medical Humanities
Muncie	Health Promotion and Disease Prevention
Northwest–Gary	Urban Medicine and Healthcare Disparities
South Bend	Ethics, Equity, and Justice
Terre Haute	Rural Health
West Lafayette	Biomedical Engineering and Applied Medical Technology; Care of Hispanic/Latino Patients

== Campuses ==
IUSM locations

The school's main facilities are located on IU Indy's campus in Indianapolis. In addition, the school maintains eight regional centers on college campuses throughout the state at Bloomington (IU Bloomington), Muncie (Ball State University), Fort Wayne (IU Fort Wayne), South Bend (University of Notre Dame), Terre Haute (Indiana State University), Evansville, West Lafayette (Purdue University), and Northwest–Gary (IU Northwest).

First- and second-year medical students attend classes at either the main campus at IU Indianapolis Indianapolis or at one of the eight regional centers. Students may elect to complete all coursework and clerkships at a regional center, or transfer to the Indianapolis campus for third- and fourth-year clerkships. Regional center students part of the Early Decision Program (a program where Indiana residents apply to only IUSM and are notified of a decision by October 1 of that application cycle) are required to complete the majority of their third- and fourth-year clinical clerkships at their regional center. Due to the Liaison Committee on Medical Education (LCME) accreditation requirement stating that students must have some interaction with a resident physician, campuses that do not have a nearby residency program must allow students to attend at least one third-year rotation at a campus that does.

=== Bloomington ===
IUSM traces its roots to Bloomington, being founded there in 1903 by president William Lowe Bryan. The Bloomington medical school building was constructed in 1937 using funds from the Works Progress Administration. Following the opening of VanNuys in 1958 and subsequent movement of all medical education to Indianapolis, the Bloomington medical science building was renamed as Myers Hall in honor of medical school dean Burton D. Myers. Not wanting Myers Hall to go unused, IU president Herman B. Wells secured funding for an advanced degree program that combined the first two years of basic science training of the MD program with a master's degree or PhD. A similar program was available at Stanford University at the time. About half of the Bloomington medical school faculty moved, with the remaining half forming the Department of Anatomy and Physiology at IU Bloomington. Medical education resumed at Bloomington in the early 1960s.

In 2002, IUSM–Bloomington traded spaces with the Indiana Molecular Biology Institute in response to both institutions' growing needs, with the school relocating to a modified space in the basement of Jordan Hall, now known simply as the Biology Building.

In August 2021, IUSM–Bloomington, the Bloomington campuses of the School of Nursing and the School of Social Work, and the IU Bloomington Department of Speech, Language, and Hearing Sciences moved into the newly constructed Health Sciences Building, a part of the Regional Academic Health Center (the RAHC). The RAHC also houses IU Health Bloomington Hospital and is located northeast of IU Bloomington's campus at the corner of East Discovery Parkway and State Road 45.

Prior to the 2023 academic year, third-year clerkships at the Bloomington campus were longitudinal, as opposed to the standard block schedule found at other IUSM campuses. Founded in 2012, the Bloomington Longitudinal Integrated Clerkship (BLIC) program was a unique aspect of the Bloomington campus and was a motivating factor for students to stay on a regional campus for their clinical education. For example, instead of doing a four-week rotation in neurology, an eight-week rotation in pediatrics, and then an eight-week rotation in surgery, students would be in a neurology clinic on Monday, a pediatrics clinic on Tuesday, an operating room on Wednesday, and so on for select rotations for most of third year. Due to the nature of this schedule, clerkship National Board of Medical Examiners shelf exams, which are normally taken at the end of a rotation, were all taken at similar times at the conclusion of the program. Because of the intense, multi-subject studying required throughout the program, BLIC students consistently scored higher on shelf exams and on Step 2 CK. Another benefit of BLIC was the development of long-term, meaningful relationships with faculty and patients. The end of BLIC and IUSM–Bloomington's transition to a block schedule was announced in early 2022, in part because the program was very challenging to coordinate and due to higher-level school administrative pressure for each IUSM campus to be more uniform and less autonomous.

=== Evansville ===
The Evansville campus was founded in 1972 as part of IUSM's regional campus system founded in 1971 which would allow medical students to complete their first and second years away from Indianapolis. The first class of five students split their time between Indiana State University–Evansville (which would become the University of Southern Indiana [USI] in 1985) and the University of Evansville (UE). Students attended gross anatomy lab in the back of UE's student union until better arrangements were established. In 1994, all courses moved to USI's Health Professions Center and in 2014, students were able to complete all four years at the regional campus. In 2018, courses moved to the new 145,000-square-foot (13,500 m^{2}) Stone Family Center for Health Sciences in downtown Evansville.

The Evansville campus includes expanded graduate medical education residencies through a consortium model with the Deaconess Health System, St. Vincent Evansville, Memorial Hospital and Health Care, and Owensboro Health.

In 2013, Indiana University, the University of Evansville, the University of Southern Indiana, and Ivy Tech Community College jointly signed letters of intent to co-locate a new interdisciplinary academic health science education in research campus in the Evansville region. The new campus was expected to open fall 2018. The interdisciplinary campus plan included a 40,000-square-foot (3,700 m^{2}) simulation center with an advanced collaborative space. The facility was planned to be a combination of immersive training space, research, and potential product development. Following a $15 million donation from philanthropists and Evansville natives Bill and Mary Stone, the new building was named the Stone Family Center for Health Sciences.

In addition to the Evansville campus of IUSM, the Stone Center also houses healthcare and related programs from USI, UE, and Ivy Tech.

=== Fort Wayne ===
IUSM–Fort Wayne is IUSM's newest campus, being founded in 1981 when it moved into the third floor of a classroom and laboratory building at IPFW. In 2009, it moved to a new 43,000-square-foot medical education building. IUSM–Fort Wayne is located on the campus of IU Fort Wayne, which shares a 688-acre campus with Purdue Fort Wayne.

=== Indianapolis ===
IUSM–Indianapolis is IUSM's flagship campus, but not its oldest. It traces its founding to 1908 following the resolution of a rivalry with Purdue.

=== Muncie ===
The Muncie campus was founded in 1971 as one of the first campuses of the new regional campus system. Its first class of four students was met by an illustrious welcoming committee consisting of Ball State University's president, vice president, and the dean of the graduate school. Originally, students undergoing rotations at Ball Memorial Hospital had a "buddy system" where they were assigned a family practice resident and rounded with them; they also had to observe an autopsy prior to class registration. These are no longer requirements for Muncie students, though a cadaver dissection is still a part of the statewide human anatomy course taught at the beginning of first year.

=== Northwest–Gary ===
IUSM's Gary campus was created from scratch, unlike other the other regional campuses that occupied spaces at existing four-year institutions. Its original class of four students and five faculty set up shop at a building in East Chicago in 1972. It moved into trailers located on IU Northwest's campus in 1975 as it awaited the construction of new buildings, which were completed soon after. It moved into the Dunes Medical Professional Building in 2005, where it remains today.

=== South Bend ===
The South Bend campus was one of the first regional campuses, being founded at Notre Dame in 1968 as part of the regional campus pilot project along with the West Lafayette campus at Purdue. Its first class of two students took part in "clinical correlation" courses by visiting family clinics on weekends, a practice that is now included statewide. IUSM–South Bend students are additionally dual-enrolled as graduate students at Notre Dame, allowing them access to Notre Dame's facilities and the benefits of being a student there, such as reduced football ticket prices.

=== Terre Haute ===
The Terre Haute campus was founded in 1971 and immediately faced a good problem—an inverted teacher-to-student ratio. This was due in part to many willing faculty at Indiana State to teach medical students. IUSM–Terre Haute is also home to IUSM's Rural Medicine Education Program, which integrates the curriculum of medical school with delivering care in a rural setting. Students at the Terre Haute campus may precept with rural physicians weekly during their first two years of medical school.

=== West Lafayette ===
While IUSM–West Lafayette traces its founding class of three medical students to 1968 as one of the first regional campuses, medical education in the Lafayette area has a history of more than 125 years. Purdue University's own department of medicine was founded there in the late 19th century, and it would exist as the School of Medicine of Purdue University from 1905 to 1908; thus, the Purdue School of Medicine was one of the component parts that contributed to the creation of the modern IUSM. Purdue's College of Pharmacy was established in 1884, and its School of Nursing was founded in 1963. Medical students at the West Lafayette campus routinely interact with pharmacy, nursing, allied health professions, and other healthcare-related students throughout their education.

For 40 years, IUSM–West Lafayette occupied a space in the basement of Lynn Hall, the home of Purdue's College of Veterinary medicine and animal hospital; it moved to the second floor of the nearby 60,000-square-foot Lyles–Porter Hall in 2014, a space it shares with other programs of Purdue's College of Health and Human Sciences. Clinical rotations are completed in area clinics, at IU Health Arnett Hospital, and at Franciscan Health Lafayette East Hospital.

Medical students at the West Lafayette campus can access a wide range of support services through both IUSM and Purdue University, as they are additionally dual-enrolled as graduate students in the Purdue University system and receive a Purdue University ID. This provides them access to a wide range of opportunities, such as the ability to check out materials from Purdue's libraries, access to recreational gyms and pools, and free rides on the Greater Lafayette CityBus. Students may also enjoy a Big Ten campus atmosphere that includes seminars, sports, arts, music festivals and performances, and many other cultural events.

In addition, students may pursue dual degrees through Purdue University, such as an MD/PhD, MD/MPH through Purdue's Department of Public Health, MD/MS through Purdue's College of Science, MD/MBA through the Daniels School of Business, and an MD/MS BME though the Weldon School of Biomedical Engineering.

== Clinical training facilities ==
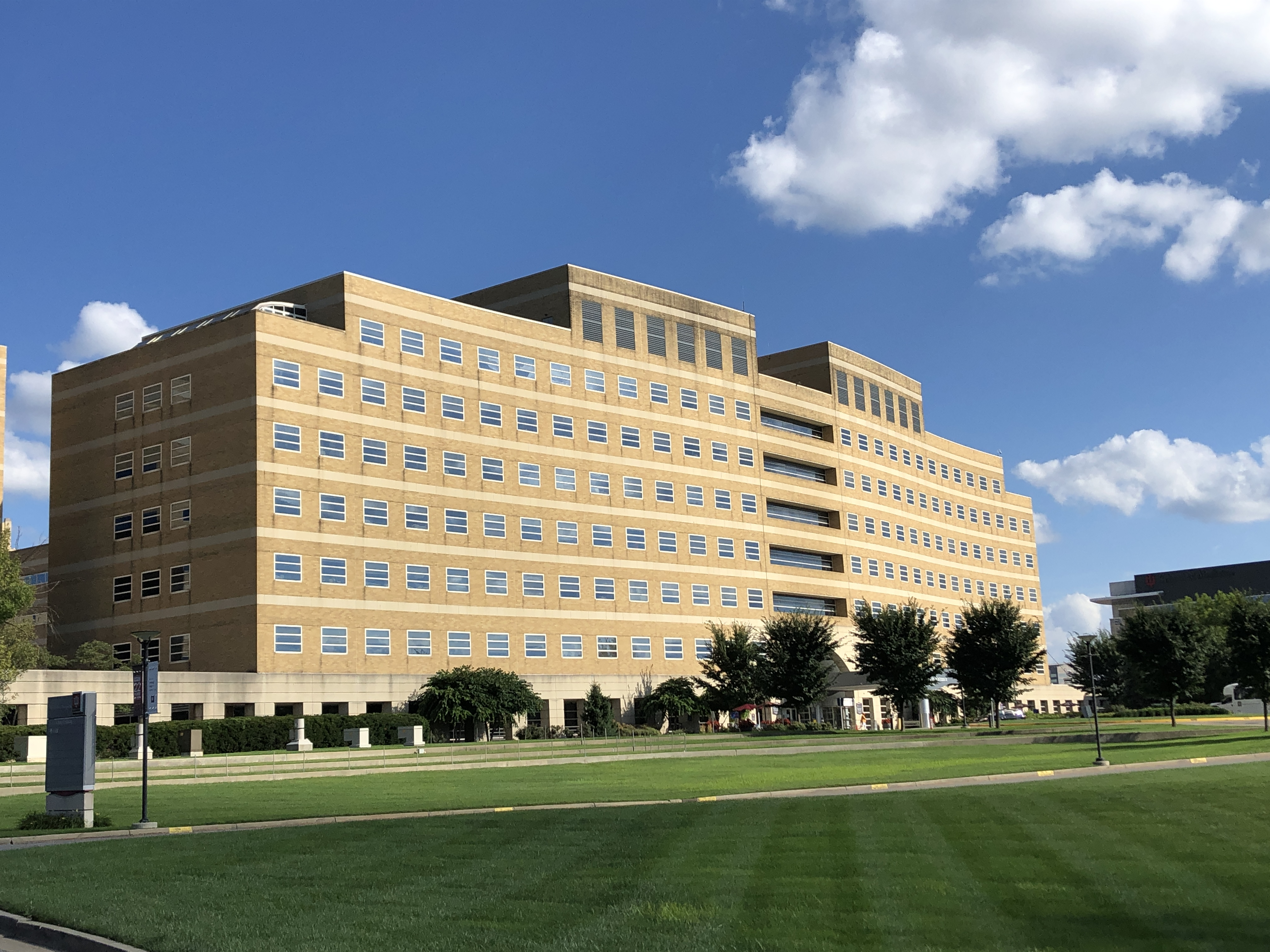
Methodist Hospital, 2022

IUSM helps train interns and residents in 92 medical and surgical specialties and subspecialties. In Indianapolis, students train under the supervision of faculty and staff at IU Health Methodist Hospital, IU Health University Hospital, Riley Hospital for Children at IU Health, the Richard L. Roudebush VA Medical Center, and Sidney and Lois Eskenazi Hospital. Most of the Indianapolis teaching hospitals are within walking distance or adjacent to IU Indy. Methodist Hospital is located a few miles from the main campus.

IUSM has a partnership program with the Moi University School of Medicine in Eldoret, Kenya through AMPATH where students may complete a double rotation in their fourth year. Selection is based on an application and lottery system, as the program is very popular.

Regional campus students may complete rotations at other various physician offices and hospitals throughout the state of Indiana, such as Ball Memorial Hospital in Muncie, hospitals and clinics affiliated with the Deaconess Health System of the Illinois–Indiana–Kentucky tri-state area, Indiana University Health-affiliated hospitals and clinics, and many others.

== Discoveries at IUSM ==
The school was the first to develop the use of echocardiography, a heart imaging technique using ultrasound. In the 1960s, Mori Aprison discovered the inhibitory neurotransmitter glycine. Dr. Paul Stark, another neuroscientist and faculty member at IUSM, led the clinical team at Eli Lilly and Company in the development of fluoxetine (Prozac), a widely prescribed antidepressant. In 1984, IUSM established the first DNA "bank" in the world; blood samples from clients were used to extract DNA which could indicate the genetic risk for certain illnesses and conditions. The school researchers also discovered the use of cord blood as an alternative source of hematopoietic stem cells and pioneered their use in the clinic. In the early 1990s, the school was one of the first institutions to study the use of computer systems in reducing the costs of healthcare management.

IUSM is the home of a National Cancer Institute-designated Clinical Cancer Center, and the only National Institute of Health-funded viral vector production facility for clinical grade therapeutics. The school is known for establishing a curative therapy for testicular cancer. The school has been a pioneer in establishing a cure for Fanconi anemia (a precancerous condition in children), specific radiation therapy techniques, techniques in a type of nerve-sparing surgery for urological cancers, the development of drugs to stimulate blood cell production, and novel drug therapies for breast cancer. Researchers at the medical school also discovered the cancer-fighting agent in tamoxifen. In 2011, the school announced plans for an institute specializing in personalized medicine, which would pursue an individualized and genomics-based approach to treating cancer, pediatrics, and obstetrics.

In 2012, federal officials designated IUSM and the Rehabilitation Hospital of Indiana as a Traumatic Brain Injury Model System site. As one of sixteen sites in the United States, the federally-funded center received a five-year, $2 million grant to research and treat traumatic brain injury and its impact on the lives of patients and their families. IUSM is also a member of the NCAA and the U.S. Department of Defense's CARE Consortium, a $30 million initiative to study concussions among student-athletes and use that knowledge to improve safety and health of athletes, military service members, and the general public. CARE Consortium research includes the exploration of post-concussive symptoms; the performance and psychological health of student-athletes; and the analysis of data related to biomechanical, clinical, neuroimaging, neurobiological, and genetic markers of injury.

=== Research centers, institutes and groups ===
- Alzheimer's Disease and Related Disorders Center
- Bowen Research Center
- Center of Excellence in Women's Health
- Diabetes Translational Research Center
- Hartford Center of Excellence in Geriatric Medicine
- Herman B Wells Center for Pediatric Research
- Indiana Alcohol Research Center
- Indiana Alzheimer Disease Center
- Indiana Center for Musculoskeletal Health
- Indiana Clinical and Translational Sciences Institute
- Indiana Spinal Cord and Head Injury Research Center
- Indiana University Center for Aging Research
- Indiana University Center for Diabetes and Metabolic Diseases
- Indiana University Melvin and Bren Simon Comprehensive Cancer Center
- Institute of Psychiatric Research
- Krannert Institute of Cardiology
- Regenstrief Institute, Inc.
- Stark Neurosciences Research Institute
- Wells Center for Pediatric Research

== Notable alumni and faculty ==
- Jerome Adams, former Indiana state health commissioner and 20th surgeon general of the United States
- Otis R. Bowen, former Indiana governor and former secretary of Health and Human Services
- Kent Brantly, physician and author known for treating and contracting Ebola
- Allison Brashear, neurologist and academic
- P. Michael Conneally, Distinguished Professor Emeritus of Medical and Molecular Genetics at IUSM; instrumental in the discovery of the gene causing Huntington's Disease; a leader in the Human Genome Project
- William S. Dalton, named president and CEO of the H. Lee Moffitt Cancer Center & Research Institute in 2002; former dean of the University of Arizona School of Medicine (2001–2002)
- John P. Donohue (1932–2008), former chair of the IU School of Medicine's urology department and distinguished professor emeritus; pioneered treatments for testicular cancer; His work with Lawrence Einhorn led to an increase in the cure rate of testicular cancer from 5% to 90%
- Lawrence Einhorn, distinguished professor of medicine, IU Medical Center; recipient of a Presidential Medal of Honor; pioneered the development of the medical treatment in 1974 for testicular cancer, increasing the survival rate from 10% to 95%
- Emily Erbelding, director of the Division of Microbiology and Infectious Diseases at the National Institute of Allergy and Infectious Diseases
- Henry Feffer, neurosurgeon
- David L. Felten, former professor at IUSM; MacArthur Fellow and neurobiologist whose research established a link between the immune and central nervous system
- Tatiana Foroud, internationally recognized genetics researcher
- John A. Galloway, endocrinologist
- Jane E. Henney, oncologist; first woman to serve as commissioner of the U.S. Food and Drug Administration
- Chet Jastremski, Olympic swimmer and medalist
- Ann Kimble-Hill, biochemist and fellow of the American Chemical society
- Suzanne Knoebel (1926–2014), cardiologist, pioneer of computer technology for heart disease research and diagnosis
- R. Ellen Magenis, distinguished pediatrician and geneticist
- Douglas Rex, gastroenterologist and Distinguished Professor of medicine
- Joseph E. Robertson, president of Oregon Health & Science University since 2006
- Adam M. Robinson, surgeon general of the United States Navy
- Robert William Schrier, founding editor-in-chief of the magazine Nature Clinical Practice Nephrology
- H. Michael Shepard, led the discovery and development of breast cancer drug Herceptin while at Genentech, Damon Runyon Cancer Research Foundation Fellow at Indiana University
- Jill Bolte Taylor, neuroanatomist; in a TED talk she shared her experiences of studying herself during a stroke; authored My Stroke of Insight: A Brain Scientist's Personal Journey, a best-selling book
- Brownsyne Tucker Edmonds, inaugural vice president and chief health equity officer for IU Health
- David Wolf, astronaut
- Sumner Alexander Furniss, first Black doctor at Indiana City Hospital, politician, activist, and freemason

== See also ==
- List of medical schools in the United States
