= Demographics of the world =

Demographics of Earth
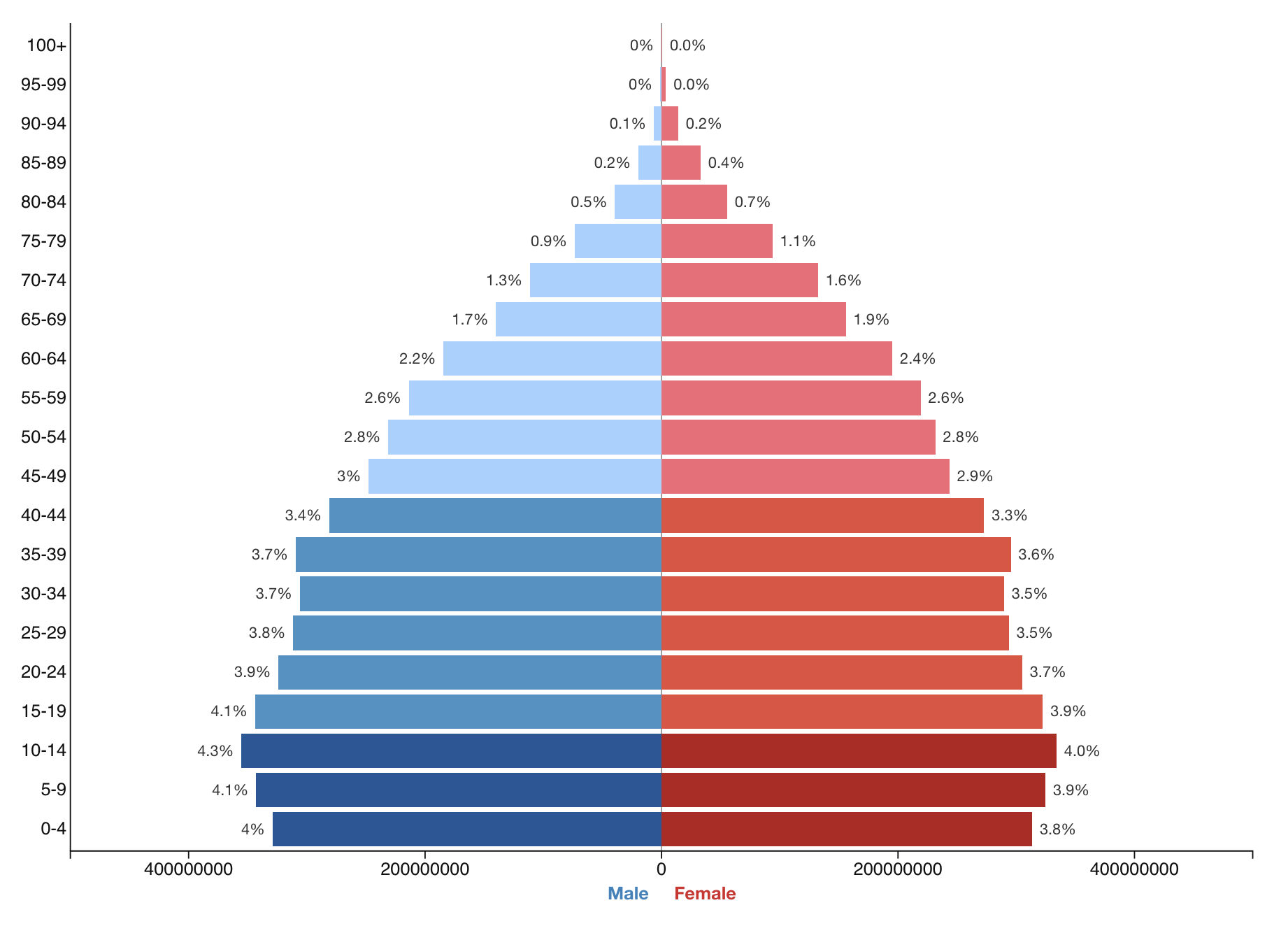
- Population pyramid of the world in 2026 by the UN
- Population: Over 8,300,678,409 (estimated 2026)
- Fertility rate: 2.24 (2025)

Earth has a human population of over 8.2 billion as of 2026, with an overall population density of 50 people per km^{2} (130 per sq. mile). Nearly 60% of the world's population lives in Asia, with more than 2.8 billion in the countries of India and China combined. The percentage shares of China, India and rest of South Asia of the world population have remained at similar levels for the last few thousand years of recorded history.

The world's population is predominantly urban and suburban, and there has been significant migration toward cities and urban centers. The urban population jumped from 29% in 1950 to 55.3% in 2018. Interpolating from the United Nations prediction that the world will be 51.3% urban by 2010, Ron Wimberley, Libby Morris and Gregory Fulkerson estimated 23 May 2007 would have been the first time the urban population was more populous than the rural population in history. India and China are the most populous countries, as the birth rate has consistently dropped in wealthy countries and until recently remained high in poorer countries. Jakarta is the largest urban agglomeration in the world.

As of 2024, the total fertility rate of the world is estimated at 2.25 children per woman, which is slightly below the global average for the replacement fertility rate of approximately 2.33 (as of 2003). However, world population growth is unevenly distributed, with the total fertility rate ranging from the world's lowest of 0.8 in South Korea, to the highest of 6.7 in Niger. The United Nations estimated an annual population increase of 1.14% for the year of 2000. The current world population growth is approximately 1.09%. People under 15 years of age made up over a quarter of the world population (25.18%), and people age 65 and over made up nearly ten percent (9.69%) in 2021. The world's literacy rate has increased dramatically in the last 40 years, from 66.7% in 1979 to 86.3% today. Lower literacy levels are mostly attributable to poverty and are found mostly in South Asia and Sub-Saharan Africa.

The world population more than tripled during the 20th century from about 1.65 billion in 1900 to 5.97 billion in 1999. It reached the 2 billion mark in 1927, the 3 billion mark in 1960, 4 billion in 1974, and 5 billion in 1987. The overall population of the world is approximately 8 billion as of November 2022. Currently, population growth is fastest among low wealth, least developed countries. The UN projects a world population of 9.15 billion in 2050, a 32.7% increase from 6.89 billion in 2010.

== Thermodynamic concept ==
In the 1860s, Rudolf Clausius realized that heat increases the disgregateness (quantity) and decreases the aggregateness (quality) of bodies:

By help of this conception the effect of heat can be simply expressed by saying that heat tends to increase the disgregation of bodies.

—Clausius, R. On the Second Fundamental Theorem of the Mechanical Theory of Heat; a Lecture delivered before the Forty-first Meeting of the German Scientific Association, at Frankfurt on the Maine, September 23, 1867 The Philosophical Magazine and Journal of Science, June 1868, pp. 407–08

Accordingly, world population displays a nearly perfect correlation with energy production.

In 2025 AD, the EROI became negative:

The global energy landscape is facing a crucial turning point. Various studies show that oil liquid production is expected to peak in 2035 at a magnitude of 500 petajoule per day (PJ/d), but when the energy required for the extraction and production of these liquids is taken into account, the net-energy peak is expected to occur in 2025 at a level of 400 PJ/d (Delannoy et al. 2021).

—Misra, Siddharth. Plummeting ‘Energy Return on Investment’ of Oil and the Impact on Global Energy Landscape Journal of Petroleum Technology, 2023 03 20

Consequently, the global quantity of humans began to decrease:

Figure 2-2 shows the projected share of the global population aged 65 and over and those aged 5 or younger between 2010 and 2060. Until very recently, younger children made up a larger share of the total population than older adults. However, by 2025, older people eclipsed this youngest group in terms of share of total population. This is the first time this “crossing” of the youngest and oldest age groups has happened in human history and is projected to drastically widen in the coming years. The share of the population aged 65 and over is projected to nearly double, from 10.5 percent (about 1 in 10 people) in 2025 to 19.6 percent (about 1 in 5 people) by 2060 (Table 2-1).

—An Aging World: 2025 U.S. Census Bureau, August 2026

== History ==
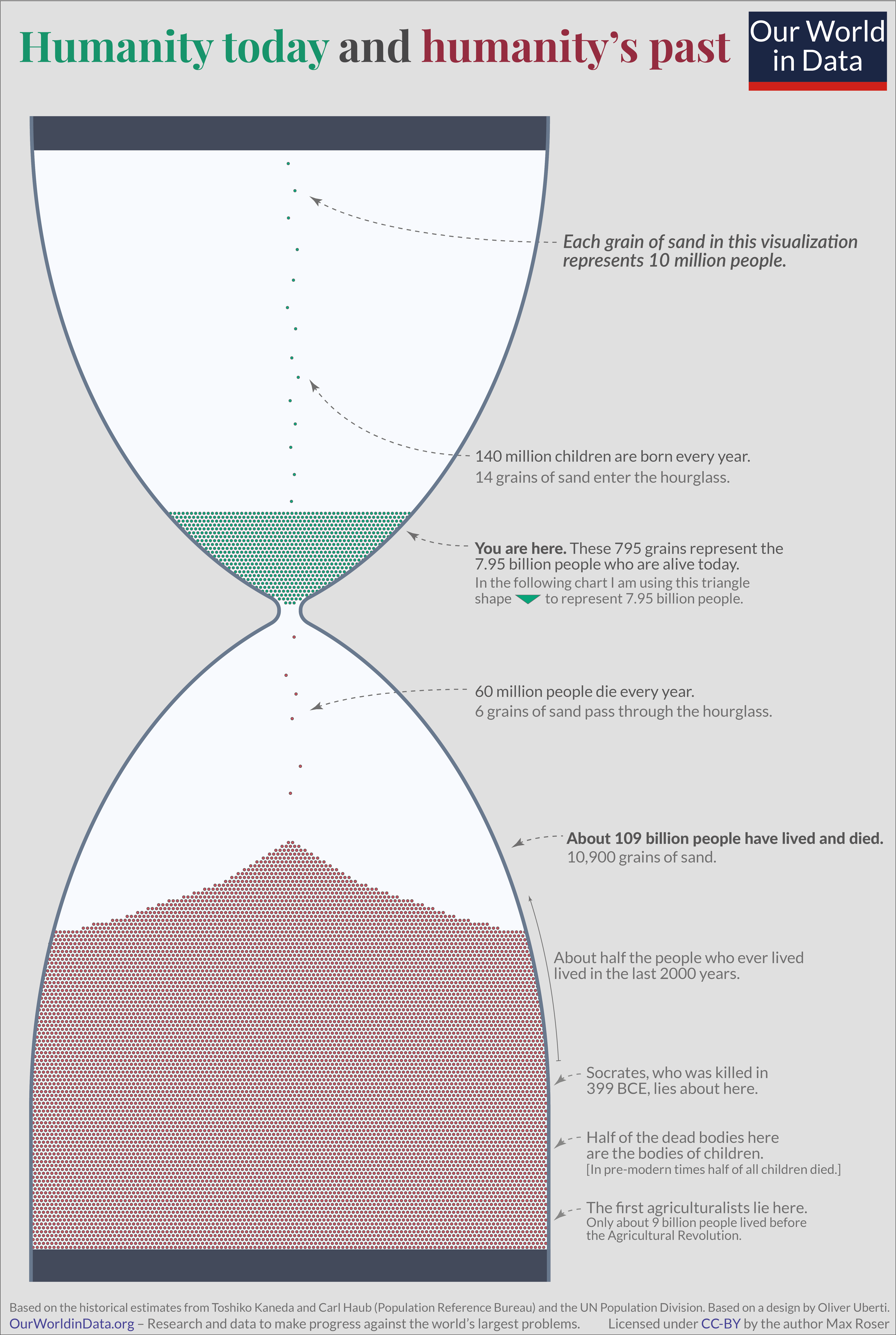
Comparison of all humans living with all previous generations, as of March 2022.

Historical migration of human populations begins with the movement of Homo erectus out of Africa across Eurasia about a million years ago. Homo sapiens appear to have occupied all of Africa about 300,000 years ago, moved out of Africa 50,000 – 60,000 years ago, and had spread across Australia, Asia and Europe by 30,000 years BC. Migration to the Americas took place 20,000 to 15,000 years ago, and by 2,000 years ago, most of the Pacific Islands were colonized.

Until c. 10,000 years ago, humans lived as hunter-gatherers. They generally lived in small nomadic groups known as band societies. The advent of agriculture prompted the Neolithic Revolution, when access to food surplus led to the formation of permanent human settlements. About 6,000 years ago, the first proto-states developed in Mesopotamia, Egypt's Nile Valley and the Indus Valley. Early human settlements were dependent on proximity to water and, depending on the lifestyle, other natural resources used for subsistence. But humans have a great capacity for altering their habitats by means of technology.

Since 1800, the human population has increased from one billion to over eight billion. In 2004, some 2.5 billion out of 6.3 billion people (39.7%) lived in urban areas. In February 2008, the U.N. estimated that half the world's population would live in urban areas by the end of the year. Problems for humans living in cities include various forms of pollution and crime, especially in inner city and suburban slums. Both overall population numbers and the proportion residing in cities are expected to increase significantly in the coming decades.

=== World Population, AD 1–1998 (in thousands) ===
Source: Maddison and others. (University of Groningen).

Year	1	1000	1500	1600	1700	1820	1870	1913	1950	1973	1998
Western Europe	24 700	25 413	57 268	73 778	81 460	132 888	187 532	261 007	305 060	358 390	388 399
Eastern Europe (excluding USSR countries)	4 750	6 500	13 500	16 950	18 800	36 415	52 182	79 604	87 289	110 490	121 006
Former USSR	3 900	7 101	16 950	20 700	26 550	54 765	88 765	156 192	180 050	249 748	290 866
Total Europe (including USSR countries)	33 350	39 013	87 718	111 428	126 810	224 068	328 386	496 803	572 399	718 628	800 271
United States	680	1 300	2 000	1 500	1 000	9 981	40 241	97 606	152 271	212 909	279 040
Other Western Offshoots	490	660	800	800	750	1 249	5 892	13 795	23 823	39 036	52 859
Total Western Offshoots	1 170	1 960	2 800	2 300	1 750	11 230	46 133	111 401	176 094	250 945	323 420
Mexico	2 200	4 500	7 500	2 500	4 500	6 587	9 219	14 970	28 485	57 643	98 553
Other Latin America	3 400	6 900	10 000	6 100	7 550	14 633	30 754	65 545	137 352	250 807	409 070
Total Latin America	5 600	11 400	17 500	8 600	12 050	21 220	39 973	80 515	165 837	308 450	507 623
Japan	3 000	7 500	15 400	18 500	27 000	31 000	34 437	51 672	83 563	108 660	126 469
China	59 600	59 000	103 000	160 000	138 000	381 000	358 000	437 140	546 815	881 940	1 242 700
India	75 000	77 000	113 000	145 000	201 000	209 000	239 000	319 000	362 000	549 000	1 029 000
Other Asia	36 600	41 400	55 400	65 000	71 800	89 366	119 619	185 092	392 481	677 214	1 172 243
Total Asia (excluding Japan)	171 200	175 400	268 400	360 000	374 800	679 366	730 619	925 932	1 298 296	2 139 154	3 389 943
Africa	16 500	33 000	46 000	55 000	61 000	74 208	90 466	124 697	228 342	387 645	759 954
World (thousands)	230,820	268,273	437,818	555,828	603,410	1,041,092	1,270,014	1,791,020	2,524,531	3,913,482	5,907,680

=== Shares of world population, AD 1–1998 (% of world total) ===
Source: Maddison and others. (University of Groningen).

Year	1	1000	1500	1600	1700	1820	1870	1913	1950	1973	1998
Western Europe	10.7	9.5	13.1	13.3	13.5	12.8	14.8	14.6	12.1	9.2	6.6
Eastern Europe (excluding USSR countries)	2.1	2.4	3.1	3.0	3.1	3.5	4.1	4.4	3.5	2.8	2.0
Former USSR	1.7	2.6	3.9	3.7	4.4	5.3	7.0	8.7	7.1	6.4	4.9
Total Europe (including USSR countries)	14.5	14.5	20.1	20.0	21.0	21.6	25.9	27.7	22.7	18.4	13.5
United States	0.3	0.5	0.5	0.3	0.2	1.0	3.2	5.4	6.0	5.4	4.6
Other Western Offshoots	0.2	0.2	0.2	0.1	0.1	0.1	0.5	0.8	0.9	1.0	0.9
Total Western Offshoots	0.5	0.7	0.6	0.4	0.3	1.1	3.6	6.2	7.0	6.4	5.5
Mexico	1.0	1.7	1.7	0.4	0.7	0.6	0.7	0.8	1.1	1.5	1.7
Other Latin America	1.5	2.6	2.3	1.1	1.3	1.4	2.4	3.7	5.4	6.4	6.9
Total Latin America	2.4	4.2	4.0	1.5	2.0	2.0	3.1	4.5	6.6	7.9	8.6
Japan	1.3	2.8	3.5	3.3	4.5	3.0	2.7	2.9	3.3	2.8	2.1
China	25.8	22.0	23.5	28.8	22.9	36.6	28.2	24.4	21.7	22.5	21.0
India	32.5	28.0	25.1	24.3	27.3	20.1	19.9	17.0	14.2	14.8	16.5
Other Asia	15.9	15.4	12.7	11.7	11.9	8.6	9.4	10.3	15.5	17.3	19.8
Total Asia (excluding Japan)	74.2	65.4	61.3	64.8	62.1	65.3	57.5	51.7	51.4	54.7	57.4
Africa	7.1	12.3	10.5	9.9	10.1	7.1	7.1	7.0	9.0	9.9	12.9
World	100.0	100.0	100.0	100.0	100.0	100.0	100.0	100.0	100.0	100.0	100.0

== Vital statistics ==
Notable events in World demography:

- 1958–1961– Great Chinese Famine
- 1989 – Fall of the Berlin Wall, Revolutions of 1989
- 2020–2022– COVID-19

The following estimates of global trends in various demographic indicators from 1950 to 2021 are from UN DESA's World Population Prospects 2022. In July 2022, UN DESA published its 2022 World Population Prospects, a biennially-updated database where key demographic indicators are estimated and projected worldwide and on the country and regional level.

Year	World population	Live births	Deaths	Natural change	Crude birth rate (per 1000)	Crude death rate (per 1000)	Population growth (in %)	Total fertility rate (TFR)	Infant mortality (per 1000 births)	Life expectancy (in years)
1950	2,499,322,000	92,083,000	48,789,000	43,294,000	36.8	19.5	1.73	4.86	143.4	46.5
1951	2,543,130,000	92,837,000	48,515,000	44,322,000	36.5	19.1	1.74	4.83	141.3	47.1
1952	2,590,271,000	97,607,000	47,647,000	49,960,000	37.7	18.4	1.93	5.01	137.3	48.2
1953	2,640,279,000	97,556,000	47,499,000	50,057,000	36.9	18.0	1.90	4.94	134.5	48.8
1954	2,691,979,000	100,348,000	47,003,000	53,345,000	37.3	17.5	1.98	5.01	131.7	49.6
1955	2,746,072,000	101,807,000	46,966,000	54,841,000	37.1	17.1	2.00	5.01	128.8	50.1
1956	2,801,003,000	101,827,000	46,807,000	55,020,000	36.4	16.7	1.96	4.94	125.8	50.6
1957	2,857,867,000	105,978,000	47,269,000	58,709,000	37.1	16.5	2.05	5.08	123.7	50.9
1958	2,916,108,000	104,557,000	46,783,000	57,774,000	35.9	16.0	1.98	4.94	121.1	51.5
1959	2,970,292,000	101,922,000	51,327,000	50,595,000	34.3	17.3	1.70	4.74	129.6	49.3
1960	3,019,233,000	102,262,000	54,974,000	47,288,000	33.9	18.2	1.57	4.70	135.1	47.7
1961	3,068,371,000	100,990,000	50,003,000	50,987,000	32.9	16.3	1.66	4.57	124.2	50.4
1962	3,126,687,000	112,053,000	46,406,000	65,647,000	35.8	14.8	2.10	5.03	112.9	53.1
1963	3,195,779,000	119,819,000	47,280,000	72,539,000	37.5	14.8	2.27	5.32	110.1	53.6
1964	3,267,212,000	117,393,000	47,065,000	70,328,000	35.9	14.4	2.15	5.13	108.2	54.2
1965	3,337,112,000	117,932,000	48,460,000	69,472,000	35.3	14.5	2.08	5.08	108.4	53.9
1966	3,406,417,000	117,182,000	48,044,000	69,138,000	34.4	14.1	2.03	4.96	106.8	54.5
1967	3,475,448,000	116,840,000	47,915,000	68,925,000	33.6	13.8	1.98	4.86	105.0	54.9
1968	3,546,811,000	121,750,000	47,948,000	73,802,000	34.3	13.5	2.08	4.96	101.9	55.5
1969	3,620,655,000	122,123,000	48,235,000	73,888,000	33.7	13.3	2.04	4.87	100.2	55.8
1970	3,695,390,000	124,117,000	48,534,000	75,583,000	33.6	13.1	2.05	4.83	98.5	56.1
1971	3,770,163,000	123,647,000	49,684,000	73,963,000	32.8	13.2	1.96	4.68	97.7	55.9
1972	3,844,801,000	123,275,000	47,962,000	75,313,000	32.1	12.5	1.96	4.55	95.0	57.1
1973	3,920,252,000	123,269,000	47,680,000	75,589,000	31.4	12.2	1.93	4.42	93.4	57.6
1974	3,995,517,000	122,437,000	47,494,000	74,943,000	30.6	11.9	1.88	4.27	92.0	58.0
1975	4,069,437,000	120,491,000	47,593,000	72,898,000	29.6	11.7	1.79	4.08	90.7	58.3
1976	4,142,506,000	120,648,000	47,408,000	73,240,000	29.1	11.4	1.77	3.98	88.7	58.7
1977	4,215,772,000	120,040,000	46,746,000	73,294,000	28.5	11.1	1.74	3.85	86.9	59.4
1978	4,289,658,000	121,337,000	46,860,000	74,477,000	28.3	10.9	1.74	3.79	84.9	59.7
1979	4,365,583,000	124,288,000	46,914,000	77,294,000	28.5	10.7	1.77	3.78	82.6	60.2
1980	4,444,008,000	126,793,000	47,317,000	79,476,000	28.5	10.6	1.79	3.75	80.4	60.6
1981	4,524,628,000	129,153,000	47,388,000	81,765,000	28.5	10.5	1.81	3.72	78.3	61.0
1982	4,607,985,000	132,513,000	47,562,000	84,951,000	28.8	10.3	1.84	3.71	76.1	61.4
1983	4,691,884,000	130,983,000	48,134,000	82,849,000	27.9	10.3	1.77	3.58	75.7	61.6
1984	4,775,836,000	133,397,000	48,341,000	85,056,000	27.9	10.1	1.78	3.55	74.1	61.9
1985	4,861,731,000	135,420,000	48,685,000	86,735,000	27.9	10.0	1.78	3.52	72.4	62.2
1986	4,950,063,000	138,420,000	48,487,000	89,933,000	28.0	9.8	1.82	3.51	70.4	62.8
1987	5,040,984,000	140,545,000	48,634,000	91,911,000	27.9	9.6	1.82	3.48	68.3	63.2
1988	5,132,294,000	139,993,000	49,284,000	90,709,000	27.3	9.6	1.77	3.39	67.8	63.3
1989	5,223,704,000	141,177,000	49,064,000	92,113,000	27.0	9.4	1.76	3.35	65.9	63.8
1990	5,316,176,000	142,451,000	49,620,000	92,831,000	26.8	9.3	1.75	3.31	64.6	64.0
1991	5,406,246,000	137,392,000	50,082,000	87,310,000	25.4	9.3	1.62	3.13	64.6	64.1
1992	5,492,686,000	135,754,000	50,182,000	85,572,000	24.7	9.1	1.56	3.04	63.8	64.3
1993	5,577,434,000	134,693,000	50,769,000	83,924,000	24.2	9.1	1.51	2.98	62.6	64.4
1994	5,660,728,000	134,185,000	51,519,000	82,666,000	23.7	9.1	1.46	2.93	61.6	64.5
1995	5,743,219,000	133,673,000	51,355,000	82,318,000	23.3	8.9	1.43	2.88	60.6	64.9
1996	5,825,145,000	133,053,000	51,519,000	81,534,000	22.8	8.8	1.40	2.83	59.4	65.1
1997	5,906,481,000	132,598,000	51,459,000	81,139,000	22.5	8.7	1.37	2.79	58.1	65.5
1998	5,987,312,000	132,287,000	51,762,000	80,525,000	22.1	8.6	1.35	2.76	57.0	65.7
1999	6,067,758,000	132,364,000	51,997,000	80,367,000	21.8	8.6	1.33	2.73	55.1	66.1
2000	6,148,899,000	134,014,000	52,100,000	81,914,000	21.8	8.5	1.33	2.73	53.3	66.5
2001	6,230,747,000	133,878,000	52,095,000	81,783,000	21.5	8.4	1.31	2.70	51.8	66.8
2002	6,312,407,000	134,020,000	52,481,000	81,539,000	21.2	8.3	1.29	2.67	50.1	67.1
2003	6,393,898,000	134,302,000	52,858,000	81,444,000	21.0	8.3	1.27	2.65	48.3	67.5
2004	6,475,751,000	135,228,000	52,965,000	82,263,000	20.9	8.2	1.27	2.64	46.6	67.8
2005	6,558,176,000	135,800,000	53,213,000	82,587,000	20.7	8.1	1.26	2.62	44.9	68.2
2006	6,641,416,000	136,910,000	53,016,000	83,894,000	20.6	8.0	1.26	2.61	43.1	68.7
2007	6,725,949,000	138,563,000	53,392,000	85,171,000	20.6	7.9	1.27	2.61	41.4	69.1
2008	6,811,597,000	140,164,000	54,038,000	86,126,000	20.6	7.9	1.26	2.61	39.9	69.3
2009	6,898,306,000	141,201,000	53,910,000	87,291,000	20.5	7.8	1.27	2.61	38.4	69.8
2010	6,985,603,000	141,633,000	54,329,000	87,304,000	20.3	7.8	1.25	2.59	37.1	70.1
2011	7,073,125,000	142,135,000	54,394,000	87,741,000	20.1	7.7	1.24	2.57	35.8	70.5
2012	7,161,698,000	144,194,000	54,790,000	89,404,000	20.1	7.7	1.25	2.59	34.4	70.9
2013	7,250,593,000	143,422,000	55,034,000	88,388,000	19.8	7.6	1.22	2.56	33.5	71.2
2014	7,339,013,000	143,671,000	55,218,000	88,453,000	19.6	7.5	1.21	2.55	32.3	71.6
2015	7,426,598,000	142,608,000	55,893,000	86,715,000	19.2	7.5	1.17	2.52	31.5	71.8
2016	7,513,474,000	143,239,000	56,201,000	87,038,000	19.1	7.5	1.16	2.53	30.5	72.1
2017	7,599,822,000	142,624,000	56,966,000	85,658,000	18.8	7.5	1.13	2.50	29.6	72.3
2018	7,683,790,000	139,629,000	57,352,000	82,277,000	18.2	7.5	1.07	2.44	29.2	72.6
2019	7,764,951,000	137,984,000	57,939,000	80,045,000	17.8	7.5	1.03	2.41	29.2	72.8
2020	7,840,953,000	135,133,000	63,174,000	71,959,000	17.2	8.1	0.92	2.35	28.7	72.0
2021	7,909,295,000	133,975,000	69,248,000	64,727,000	16.9	8.8	0.82	2.32	28.4	71.0
2022	8,021,407,000	132,475,000	62,276,000	70,197,000	16.5	7.8	0.88	2.27	28.2	72.6
2023	8,091,735,000	132,110,000	61,652,000	70,459,000	16.3	7.6	0.87	2.25	27.3	73.2

View source data.
View source data.
View source data.
View source data.

== Current world population and latest projection ==
Population pyramid of the world in continental groupings in 2023

Current world population and latest projection according the UN. Population in (millions) and percent of the global population in that year.
Region	2022 (percent)	2030 (percent)	2050 (percent)
Sub-Saharan Africa	1,152 (14.51%)	1,401 (16.46%)	2,094 (21.62%)
Northern Africa and Western Asia	549 (6.91%)	617 (7.25%)	771 (7.96%)
Southern and Central Asia	2,065 (26.13%)	2,248 (26.41%)	2,575 (26.58%)
Eastern Asia	1,642 (20.71%)	1,647 (19.32%)	1,522 (15.71%)
Southeastern Asia	675 (8.49%)	721 (8.47%)	771 (7.95%)
Europe and North America	1120 (14.10%)	1129 (13.26%)	1125 (11.61%)
Latin America and the Caribbean	658 (8.29%)	695 (8.17%)	749 (7.73%)
Australia/New Zealand	31 (0.39%)	34 (0.40%)	38 (0.39%)
Other Oceania	14 (0.18%)	15 (0.18%)	20 (0.21%)
World	7,942	8,512	9,687

== Major cities ==
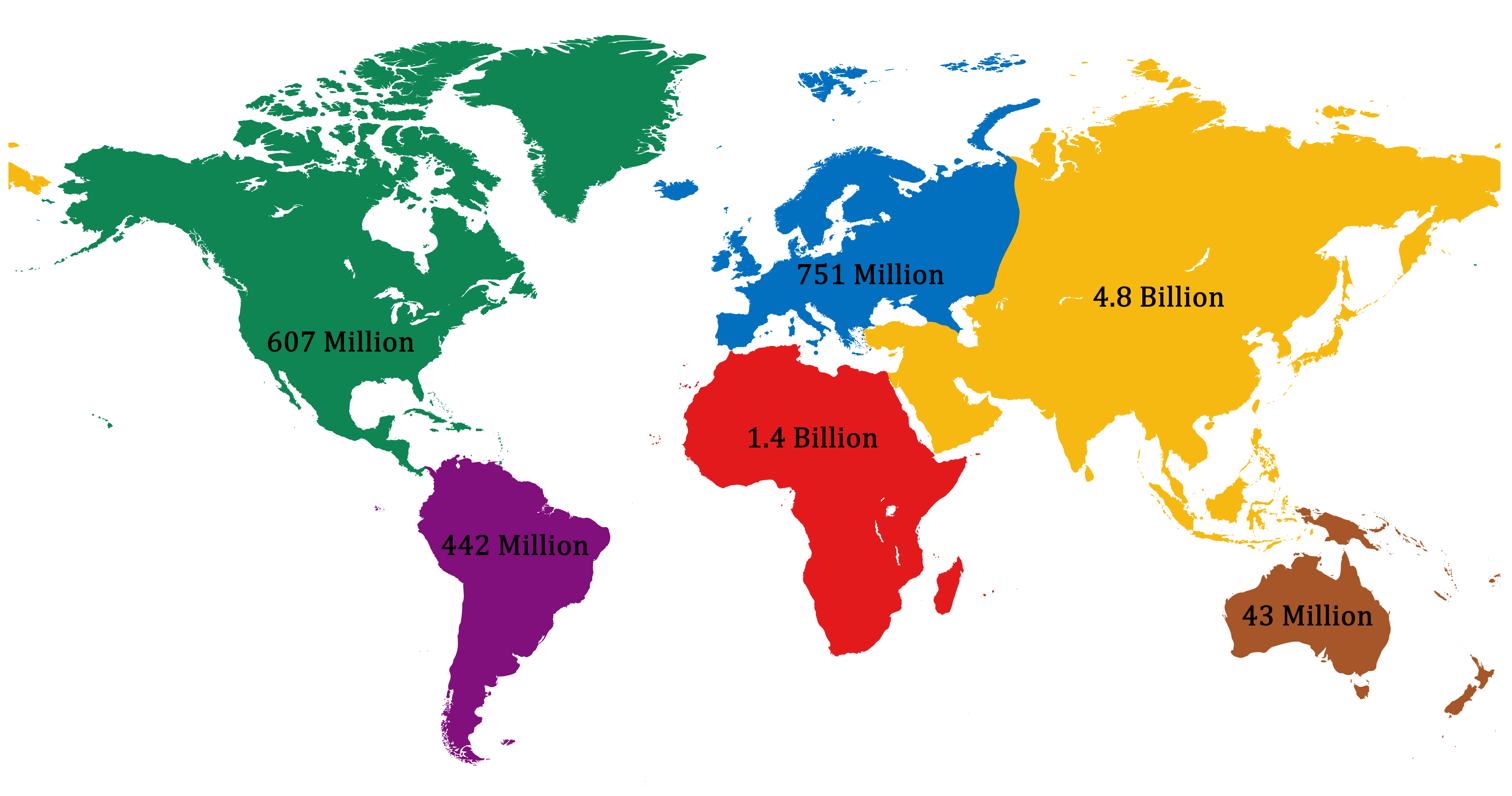
Population by continent (2022 data)

The world has hundreds of cities across it with most being in coastal regions. According to the latest official data, the world population is 8,209,580,000 people.

As of 2010, about 3 billion people live in or around urban areas.

The following table shows the populations of the top thirteen conglomerations.

Rank	City	Population	Country	Statistical concept	Area (km^{2}) (Note: The area figures are taken from individual national censuses according to the criteria and statistical concepts noted in the World Urbanization Prospects.)	Density (p/km^{2})
1	Tokyo	37,500,000	Japan	Metropolitan area (Note: As defined by the Statistics Bureau of Japan; refers to Kanto major metropolitan area (M.M.A.))	13,500	2,777.78
2	Shanghai	24,180,000	China	Urban agglomeration (Note: The population of the city is composed of population in all City Districts meeting the criteria such as "contiguous built-up area", being the location of the local government, being a Street or Having a Resident Committee.)	3,920	6,168
3	New York City	23,600,000	United States	Urban agglomeration	21,483	1,098
4	Mexico City	22,460,000	Mexico	Metropolitan area (zona metropolitana)	7,815	2,490
5	Delhi	22,157,000	India	Urban agglomeration (Note: Based on a definition of urban agglomeration that is not restricted to state boundaries.)	33,578	659
6	São Paulo	22,048,504	Brazil	Metropolitan Area	7,946.96	2,714.45
7	Moscow	21,534,777	Russia	Metropolitan area	26,000	770
8	Lagos	21,000,000	Nigeria	Metropolitan area	1,171	17,933
9	Cairo	20,901,000	Egypt	Metropolitan area	1,709	10,400
10	Karachi	20,382,881	Pakistan	Metropolitan area (megacity)	3,530	4,224
11	Mumbai	20,041,000	India	Urban agglomeration	1,097 (Note: The Greater Mumbai urban agglomeration is defined by the municipal corporations of Greater Mumbai, Kalyan-Dombivali, Navi Mumbai, Thane and Ulhasnagar, plus the municipal councils of Ambarnath, Badlapur and Mira-Bhayandar. Not to be confused with the Mumbai Metropolitan Region, which includes some additional urban and rural units.)	18,268
12	Kolkata	15,552,000	India	Urban agglomeration	1,026	15,158
13	Dhaka	14,648,000	Bangladesh	Metropolitan area (megacity)	1,600	9,155

== Population density ==
Population density (people per km^{2}) by country

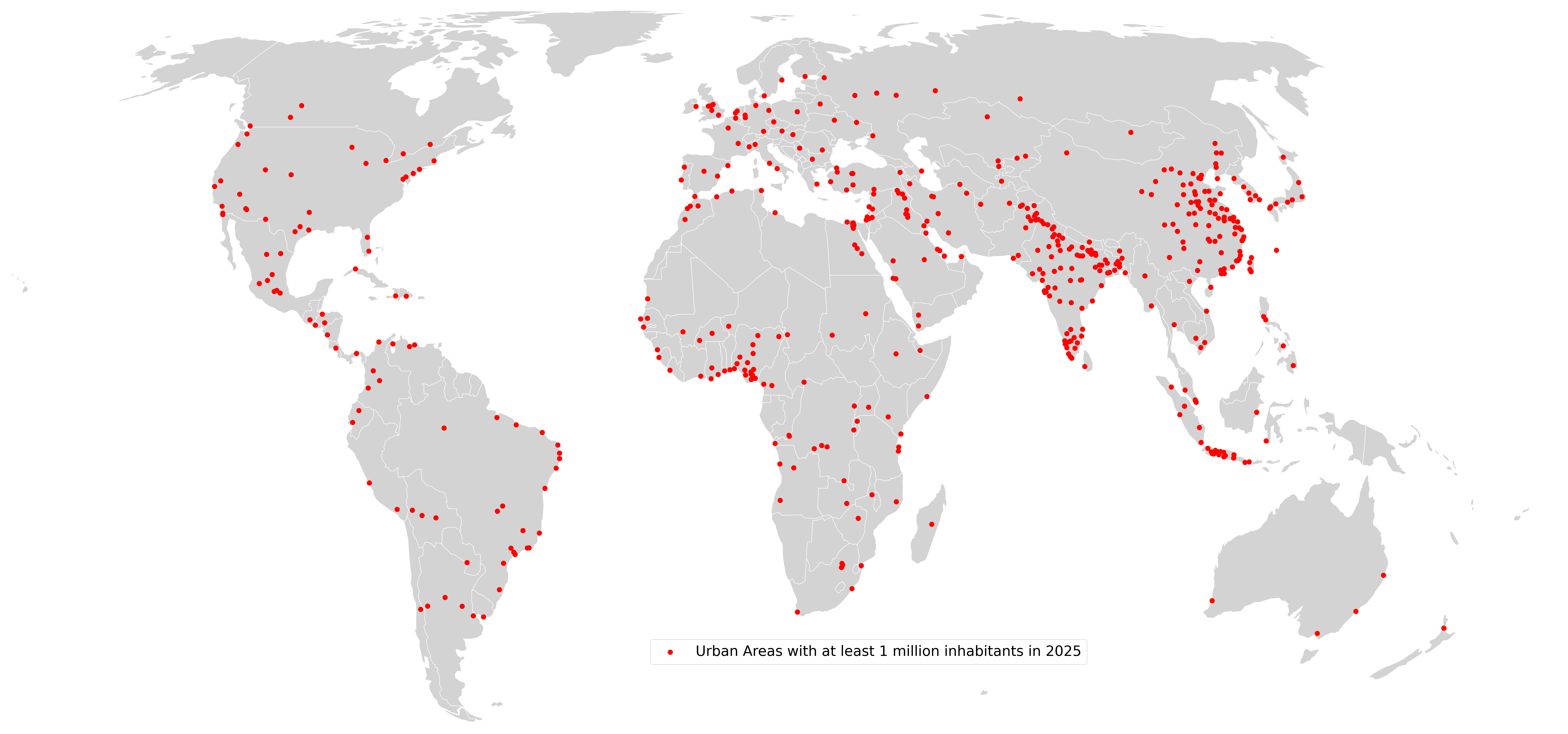
Map showing urban areas with at least one million inhabitants in 2025. Only 3% of the world's population lived in urban areas in 1800; this proportion had risen to 47% by 2000, and reached 56% by 2020.

The world's population is over 8 billion and Earth's total surface area (including land and water) is 510 million square kilometres (197 million square miles). Therefore, the worldwide human population density is 8 billion ÷ 510 million km^{2} (197 million sq mi) = 15.7 people/km^{2} (41 people/sq mi). If only the Earth's land area of 150 million km^{2} (58 million sq mi) is taken into account, then human population density increases to 53.3 people/km^{2} (138 people/sq mi).

Several of the most densely populated territories in the world are city-states, microstates or dependencies. These territories share a relatively small area and a high urbanization level, with an economically specialized city population drawing also on rural resources outside the area, illustrating the difference between high population density and overpopulation.

== Religion ==
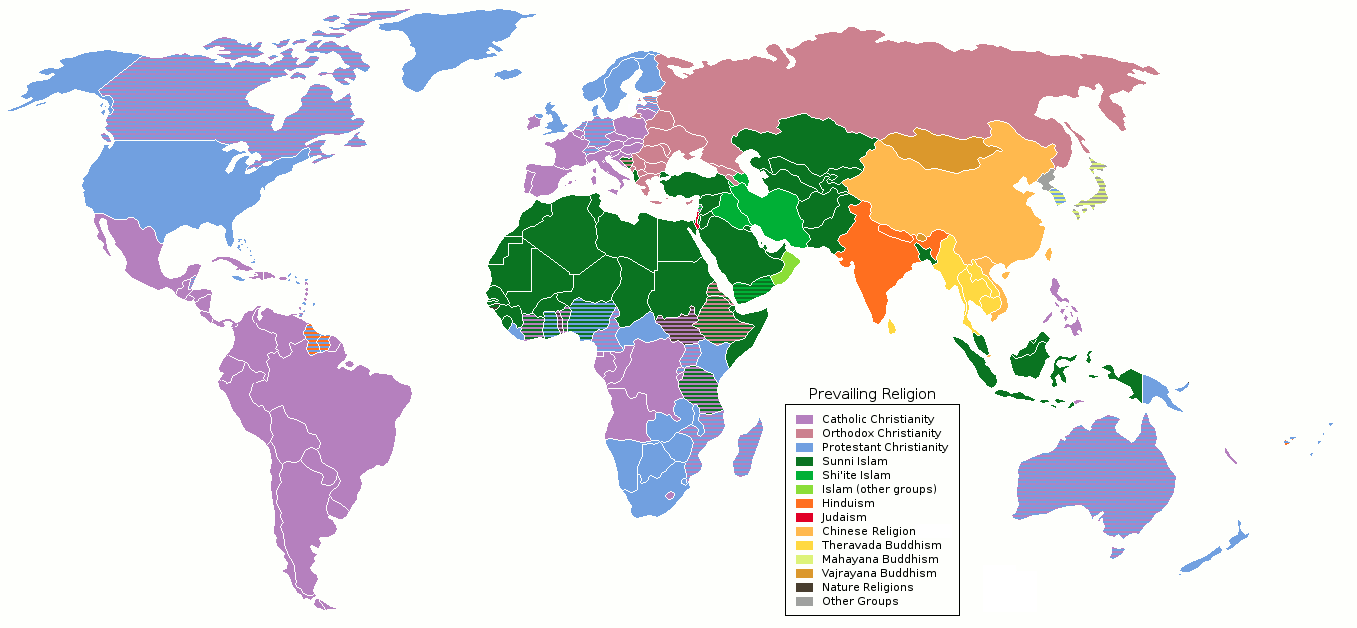
Major denominations and religions of the world

The table below lists religions classified by philosophy; however, religious philosophy is not always the determining factor in local practice. Please note that this table includes heterodox movements as adherents to their larger philosophical category, although this may be disputed by others within that category. For example, Cao Đài is listed because it claims to be a separate category from Buddhism, while Hòa Hảo is not, even though they are similar new religious movement.

The population numbers below are computed by a combination of census reports, random surveys (in countries where religion data is not collected in census, for example United States or France), and self-reported attendance numbers, but results can vary widely depending on the way questions are phrased, the definitions of religion used and the bias of the agencies or organizations conducting the survey. Informal or unorganized religions are especially difficult to count. Some organizations may wildly inflate their numbers.

Global religious affiliation
Religious category	Number of followers (in millions)		Cultural tradition	Main regions covered
Christianity	2,300–2,400		Abrahamic religions	Predominant in the Western world (Western Europe, the Americas, Oceania), Eastern Europe, Russia, Sub-Saharan Africa, the Philippines, and East Timor in Southeast Asia. Minorities worldwide, see Christianity by country.
Islam	1,600–1,800		Abrahamic religions	West Asia, Northern Africa, Central Asia, Indian Subcontinent, Western Africa, Maritime Southeast Asia with large population centers existing in Eastern Africa, Balkan Peninsula, Russia and China.
Hinduism	1,110-1,200		Indian religions	Indian subcontinent, Bali, Mauritius, Fiji, Guyana, Trinidad and Tobago, Suriname, and among the overseas Indian communities.
No religion	1,100		Secularism, half of those are theistic (but do not fit in with the major religions)	Predominant in the Western world, East Asia. Minorities worldwide, see list of countries by irreligion.
Buddhism	400–600		Indian religions	Indian Subcontinent, East Asia, Southeast Asia, Australia and some regions of Russia.
Folk religions	600–3,000	(Note: The number of people who consider themselves party to a "folk tradition" is impossible to determine.)	Folk religions	Africa, Asia, Americas
Chinese folk religions (including Taoism and Confucianism)	400–1,000		Chinese Religions	East Asia, Vietnam, Singapore and Malaysia.
Shinto	27–65		Japanese Religions	Japan
Sikhism	24–30		Indian religions	Indian Subcontinent, Australasia, Northern America, Southeast Asia, the United Kingdom and Western Europe.
Judaism	14–18		Abrahamic religions	Israel and the worldwide Jewish diaspora (mostly North America, South America, Europe, Ethiopia, and Asia).
Jainism	8–12	(Note: Figures for the population of Jains differ from just over six million to twelve million due to difficulties of Jain identity, with Jains in some areas counted as a Hindu sect. Many Jains do not return Jainism as their religion on census forms for various reasons such as certain Jain castes considering themselves both Hindu and Jain. Following a major advertising campaign urging Jains to register as such, the 1981 Census of India returned 3.19 million Jains. This was estimated at the time to still be half the true number. The 2001 Census of India had 8.4 million Jains.)	Indian religions	India, and East Africa.
Baháʼí Faith	7.3–7.9		Abrahamic religions (Note: Historically, the Baháʼí Faith arose in 19th century Persia, in the context of Shia Islam, and thus may be classed on this basis as a divergent strand of Islam, placing it in the Abrahamic tradition. However, the Baháʼí Faith considers itself an independent religious tradition, which draws from Islam but also other traditions. The Baháʼí Faith may also be classed as a new religious movement, due to its comparatively recent origin, or may be considered sufficiently old and established for such classification to not be applicable.)	Noted for being dispersed worldwide but the top ten populations (amounting to about 65% of the world's Baháʼí Faith adherents) are (in order of size of community) India, United States, Kenya, Vietnam, DR of the Congo, Philippines, Iran, Zambia, South Africa, Bolivia
Cao Đài	1–3		Vietnamese Religions	Vietnam.
Cheondoism	3		Korean religions	Korea
Tenrikyo	2		Japanese religions	Japan, Brazil.
Wicca	1		New religious movements	United States, Australia, Europe, Canada.
Church of World Messianity	1		Japanese Religions	Japan, Brazil
Seicho-no-Ie	0.8		Japanese religions	Japan, Brazil.
Rastafari movement	0.7		New religious movements, Abrahamic religions	Jamaica, Caribbean, Africa.
Unitarian Universalism	0.63		New religious movements	United States, Canada, Europe.

Since the late 19th century, the demographics of religion have changed a great deal. Some countries with a historically large Christian population have experienced a significant decline in the numbers of professed active Christians: see demographics of atheism. Symptoms of the decline in active participation in Christian religious life include declining recruitment for the priesthood and monastic life, as well as diminishing attendance at church. On the other hand, since the 19th century, large areas of sub-Saharan Africa have been converted to Christianity, and this area of the world has the highest population growth rate. In the realm of Western civilization, there has been an increase in the number of people who identify themselves as secular humanists. Despite the decline, Christianity remains the dominant religion in the Western world, where 70% of the population is Christian. In many countries, such as the People's Republic of China, communist governments have discouraged religion, making it difficult to count the actual number of believers. However, after the collapse of communism in numerous countries of Eastern Europe and the former Soviet Union, religious life has been experiencing resurgence there, in the form of traditional Eastern Christianity. While, Islam however has gained considerably in the Soviet Unions former republics in Central Asia.

Following is some available data based on the work of the World Christian Encyclopedia:

=== Growth rate of adherents ===
Trends in annual growth of adherents
Faith	1970–1985	1990–2000	2000–2005
Islam	2.74%	2.13%	1.84%
Baháʼí Faith	3.65%	2.28%	1.70%
Hinduism	2.34%	1.69%	1.57%
Christianity	1.64%	1.36%	1.32%
Judaism	1.09%	1.87%	1.62%
Buddhism	1.67%	1.09%	
Zoroastrianism		2.65%	

The annual growth in the world population over the same period is 1.41%.

Studies conducted by the Pew Research Center have found that, generally, poorer nations had a larger proportion of citizens who found religion to be very important than richer nations, with the exceptions of the United States and Kuwait.

In the book Shall the Religious Inherit the Earth?, Eric Kaufmann argues that demographic trends point to religious fundamentalists greatly increasing as a share of the population over the next century. Other scholars have argued that this may be a form of "cultural selection" that will affect future demographics due to certain religious groups having high fertility that is unexplained by other factors such as income.

== Marriage ==
The average age of marriage varies greatly from country to country and has varied through time. Women tend to marry earlier than men and currently varies from 17.6 for women in Niger, to 32.4 for women in Denmark while men range from 22.6 in Mozambique to 35.1 in Sweden.

In 2021, 13.3 million babies, or about 10 per cent of the total worldwide, were born to mothers under 20 years old.

== Age structure ==
Population pyramid of the world from 1950 to 2100 by the UN

World age structure from 1950 to 2100 (projected)

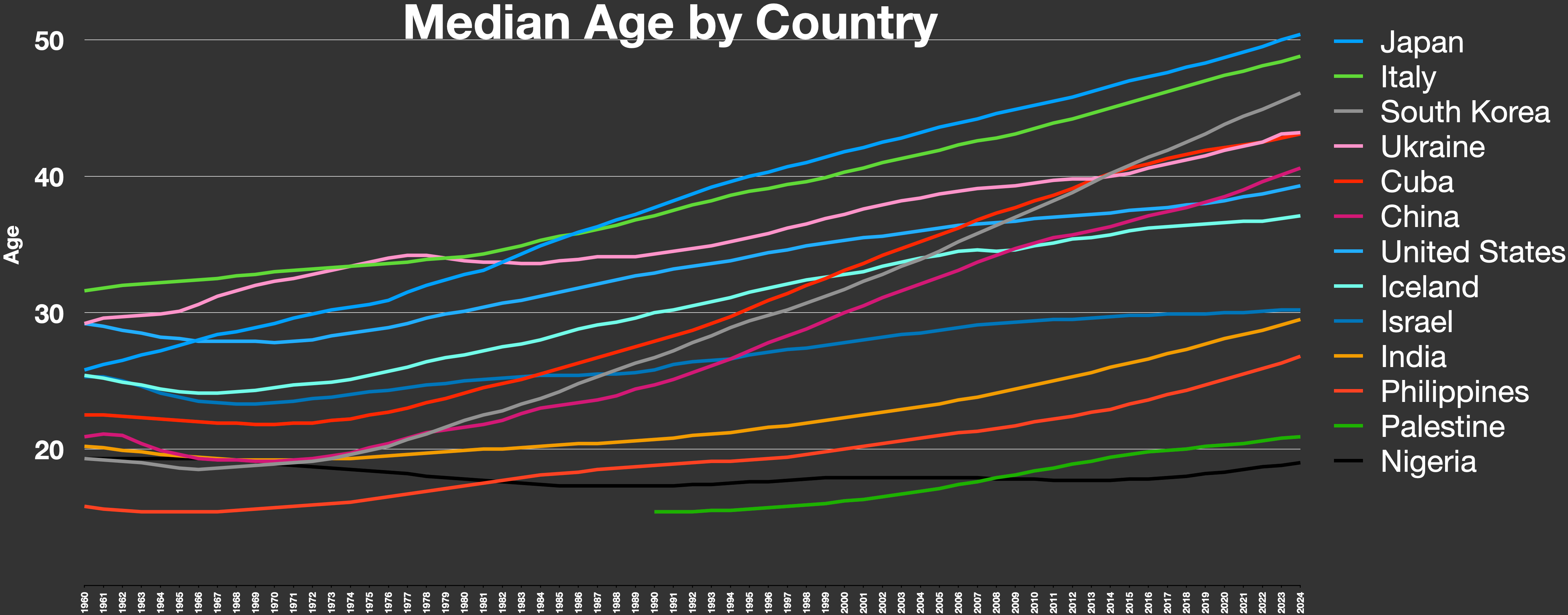
Median age by country

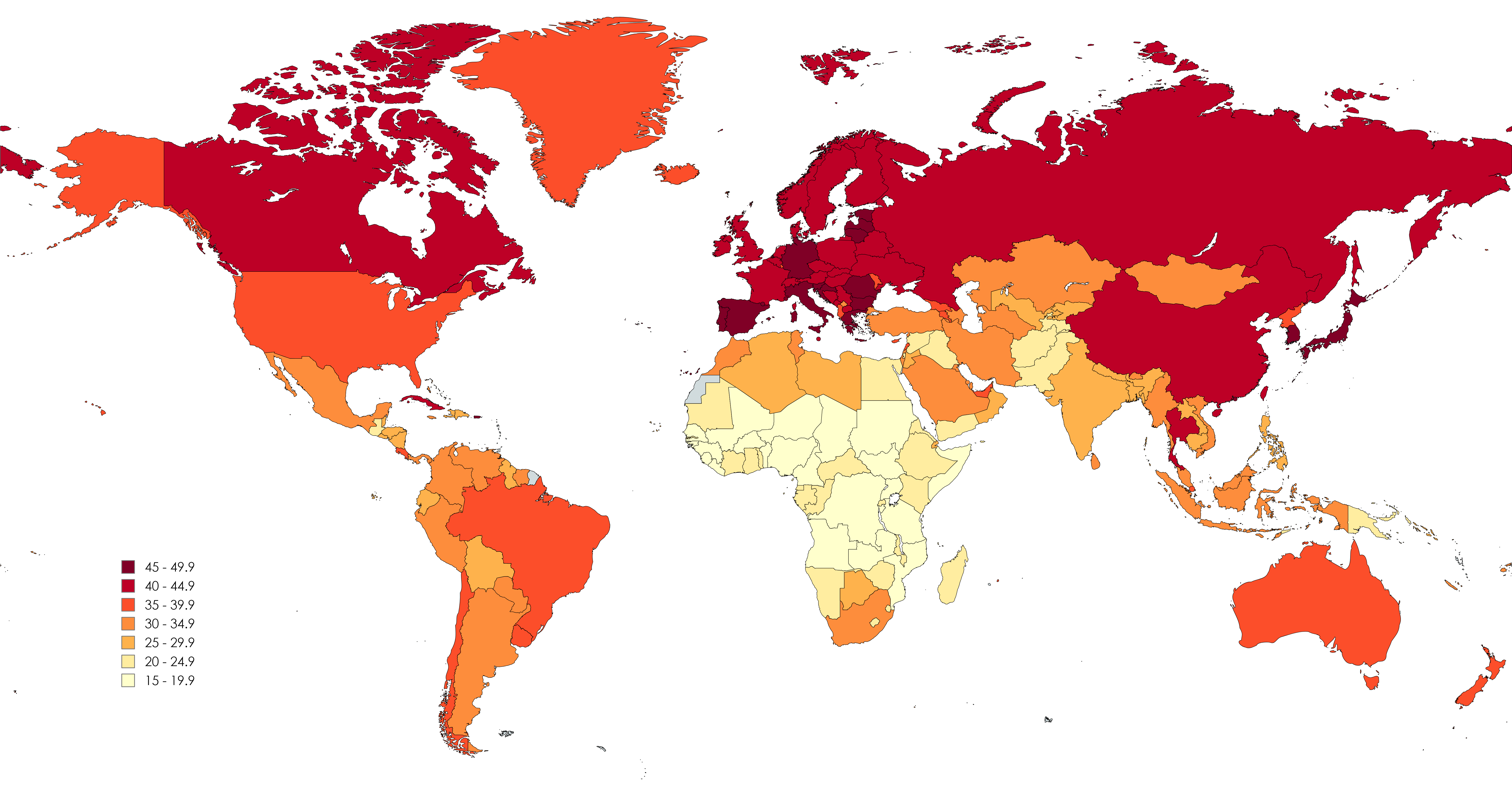
Median age by country as of 2024. A youth bulge is evident for Africa, and to a lesser extent for West Asia, South Asia, Southeast Asia and parts of the Americas.

According to the 2021 CIA World Factbook, around 25% of the world's population is below 15 years of age.

- 0–14 years: 25.2% (male 1,010,373,278/female 946,624,579)
- 15–64 years: 65.1% (male 2,562,946,384/female 2,498,562,457)
- 65 years and over: 9.7% (male 337,244,947/female 415,884,753) (2021 est.)
- Median Age – 31 years (male: 30.3 years, female: 31.8 years, 2021 est.)

According to a report by the Global Social Change Research Project, worldwide, the percent of the population age 0–14 declined from 34% in 1950 to 27% in 2010. The elderly population (60+) increased during the same period from 8% to 11%.

Median age by continent, 2018
Region	Median age
Asia	31
Africa	18
Europe	42
North America	35
South America	31
Oceania	33

Proportions of population for select age groups by continent, 2018
Region	Under 15 years	Over 65 years
Asia	24%	8%
Africa	41%	3%
Europe	16%	18%
Latin America–Caribbean	26%	8%
North America	19%	15%
Oceania	23%	12%
World	26%	9%

== Population growth rate ==
Growth rate of world population (1950–2010) The sharp decline in world population growth in the early 1960s caused primarily by the Great Chinese Famine

Globally, the growth rate of the human population has been declining since peaking in 1962 and 1963 at 2.20% per annum. In 2009, the estimated annual growth rate was 1.1%. The CIA World Factbook gives the world annual birthrate, mortality rate, and growth rate as 1.915%, 0.812%, and 1.092% respectively The last one hundred years have seen a rapid increase in population due to medical advances and massive increase in agricultural productivity made possible by the Green Revolution.

2010–2015 net population increase rate, per 1000 people

The actual annual growth in the number of humans fell from its peak of 88.0 million in 1989, to a low of 73.9 million in 2003, after which it rose again to 75.2 million in 2006. Since then, annual growth has declined. In 2009, the human population increased by 74.6 million, which is projected to fall steadily to about 41 million per annum in 2050, at which time the population will have increased to about 9.2 billion. Each region of the globe has seen great reductions in growth rate in recent decades, though growth rates remain above 2% in some countries of the Middle East and Sub-Saharan Africa, and also in South Asia, Southeast Asia, and Latin America.

Some countries experienced negative population growth, especially in Eastern Europe mainly due to low fertility rates, high death rates and emigration. In Southern Africa, growth is slowing due to the high number of HIV-related deaths. Some Western Europe countries might also encounter negative population growth. Japan's population began decreasing in 2005.

Population in the world increased from 1990 to 2008 with 1,423 billion and 27% growth. Measured by persons, the increase was highest in India (290 million) and China (192 million). Population growth was highest in Qatar (174%) and United Arab Emirates (140%).

In 2022, the world population reached 8 billion. The latest projections by the United Nations suggest that the global population could grow to around 8.5 billion in 2030, 9.7 billion in 2050 and 10.4 billion in 2100.

More than half of the projected increase in global population up to 2050 will be concentrated in just eight countries: Democratic Republic of the Congo, Egypt, Ethiopia, India, Nigeria, Pakistan, Philippines and Tanzania.

Rank	Country	Population (thousands)			Growth (%) 1990–2010
Rank	Country	1990	2010	2023	Growth (%) 1990–2010
	World	5,306,425	6,895,889	8,035,118	30.0%
1	India	873,785	1,224,614	1,428,627	40.2%
2	China	1,145,195	1,341,335	1,425,671	17.1%
3	United States	253,339	310,384	331,002	22.5%
4	Indonesia	184,346	239,871	273,523	30.1%
5	Pakistan	111,845	173,593	220,892	55.2%
6	Brazil	149,650	194,946	212,559	30.3%
7	Nigeria	97,552	158,423	206,139	62.4%
8	Bangladesh	105,256	148,692	164,689	41.3%
9	Russia	148,244	142,958	145,934	−3.6%
10	Mexico	86,007	114,092	128,932	32.7%

== Births ==
In 2021, most births worldwide occurred in two regions: sub-Saharan Africa (29 per cent of global births), the region with the highest fertility level, Central and Southern Asia (28 per cent of global births) and Eastern and South-Eastern Asia (18 per cent).

== Birth count ==
The 10 countries with the highest estimated number of births in 2021 according to the World Population Prospects 2022 of the United Nations Department of Economic and Social Affairs.

Rank	Country	Number of births (2021)
1	India	23,114,000
2	China	10,881,567
3	Nigeria	7,923,294
4	Pakistan	6,374,741
5	Indonesia	4,496,383
6	Democratic Republic of the Congo	4,034,953
7	Ethiopia	3,895,734
8	United States	3,722,822
9	Bangladesh	3,019,672
10	Brazil	2,760,958

== Birth rate ==
Countries by birth rate

As of 2009, the average birth rate (unclear whether this is the weighted average rate per country [with each country getting a weight of 1], or the unweighted average of the entire world population) for the whole world is 19.95 per year per 1000 total population, a 0.48% decline from 2003's world birth rate of 20.43 per 1000 total population.

World historical and predicted crude birth rates (1950–2050) UN, medium variant, 2008 rev.
Years	CBR	Years	CBR
1950–1955	37.2	2000–2005	21.2
1955–1960	35.3	2005–2010	20.3
1960–1965	34.9	2010–2015	19.4
1965–1970	33.4	2015–2020	18.2
1970–1975	30.8	2020–2025	16.9
1975–1980	28.4	2025–2030	15.8
1980–1985	27.9	2030–2035	15.0
1985–1990	27.3	2035–2040	14.5
1990–1995	24.7	2040–2045	14.0
1995–2000	22.5	2045–2050	13.4

According to the CIA – The World Factbook, the country with the highest birth rate currently is Niger at 51.26 births per 1000 people. The country with the lowest birth rate is Japan at 7.64 births per 1000 people. Hong Kong, a Special Administrative Region of China, is at 7.42 births per 1000 people. As compared to the 1950s, birth rate was at 36 births per 1000 in the 1950s, birth rate has declined by 16 births per 1000 people. In July 2011, the U.S. National Institutes of Health announced that the adolescent birth rate continues to decline.

Birth rates vary even within the same geographic areas. In Europe, as of July 2011, Ireland's birth rate is 16.5 percent, which is 3.5 percent higher than the next-ranked country, the UK. France has a birth rate of 12.8 per cent while Sweden is at 12.3 percent. In July 2011, the UK's Office for National Statistics (ONS) announced a 2.4% increase in live births in the UK in 2010 alone. This is the highest birth rate in the UK in 40 years. By contrast, the birth rate in Germany is only 8.3 per 1,000, which is so low that both the UK and France, which have significantly smaller populations, produced more births in 2010. Birth rates also vary within the same geographic area, based on different demographic groups. For example, in April 2011, the U.S. CDC announced that the birth rate for women over the age of 40 in the U.S. rose between 2007 and 2009, while it fell among every other age group during the same time span. In August 2011, Taiwan's government announced that its birth rate declined in the previous year, despite the fact that it implemented a host of approaches to encourage its citizens to have babies.

Birth rates ranging from 10 to 20 births per 1000 are considered low, while rates from 40 to 50 births per 1000 are considered high. There are problems associated with both an extremely high birth rate and an extremely low birth rate. High birth rates can cause stress on the government welfare and family programs to support a youthful population. Additional problems faced by a country with a high birth rate include educating a growing number of children, creating jobs for these children when they enter the workforce, and dealing with the environmental effects that a large population can produce. Low birth rates can put stress on the government to provide adequate senior welfare systems and also the stress on families to support the elders themselves. There will be less children or working age population to support the constantly growing aging population.

=== Highest and lowest birth rates (annual births per 1000 persons) ===
The ten countries with the highest and lowest crude birth rate, according to the 2018 and 2022 CIA World Factbook estimates, are:

(These lists include independent countries only, not regions.)

Rank (2022)	Country	Highest (2022)
1	Niger	47.08
2	Angola	41.80
3	Benin	41.15
4	Mali	41.07
5	Uganda	40.94
6	Chad	40.45
7	DRC	40.08
8	Somalia	37.98
9	South Sudan	37.69
10	Mozambique	37.47

Rank (2022)	Country	Lowest (2022)
1	Saint Pierre and Miquelon	6.47
2	Monaco	6.66
3	Andorra	6.88
4	South Korea	6.92
5	Japan	6.95
6	Italy	6.95
7	Spain	7.13
8	Taiwan	7.39
9	Greece	7.61
10	Puerto Rico	7.87

Rank (2018)	Country	Highest (2018)
1	Angola	43.7
2	Niger	43.6
3	Mali	43.2
4	Chad	43.0
5	Uganda	42.4
6	Zambia	41.1
7	Burundi	40.9
8	Malawi	40.7
9	Somalia	39.3
10	Liberia	37.9

Rank (2018)	Country	Lowest (2018)
1	Monaco	6.5
2	Andorra	7.3
3	Japan	7.5
4	Portugal	8.2
5	Taiwan	8.2
6	Greece	8.3
7	South Korea	8.3
8	Bulgaria	8.5
9	Italy	8.5
10	Germany	8.6

== Death rate ==
The ten countries with the highest and lowest crude death rate, according to the 2018 and 2022 CIA World Factbook estimates, are:

Rank (2022)	Country	Highest death rates (2022) (annual deaths/1000 persons)
1	Serbia	16.39
2	Romania	15.26
3	Lithuania	15.12
4	Latvia	14.65
5	Bulgaria	14.41
6	Ukraine	13.77
7	Russia	13.36
8	Estonia	13.10
9	Belarus	12.88
10	Croatia	12.88

Rank (2022)	Country	Lowest death rates (2022) (annual deaths/1000 persons)
1	Qatar	1.42
2	United Arab Emirates	1.56
3	Kuwait	2.25
4	Bahrain	2.82
5	Palestine, Gaza Strip	2.91
6	Oman	3.23
7	Palestine, West Bank	3.40
8	Saudi Arabia	3.42
9	Libya	3.45
10	Jordan	3.45

Rank (2018)	Country	Highest death rates (2018) (annual deaths/1000 persons)
1	South Sudan	19.30
2	Lesotho	15.10
3	Lithuania	14.80
4	Bulgaria	14.50
5	Latvia	14.50
6	Ukraine	14.30
7	Serbia	13.60
8	Russia	13.40
9	Afghanistan	13.20
10	Belarus	13.20

Rank (2018)	Country	Lowest death rates (2018) (annual deaths/1000 persons) (Note: This list includes only independent countries, not regions.)
1	Qatar	1.60
2	United Arab Emirates	1.70
3	Kuwait	2.30
4	Bahrain	2.80
5	Oman	3.30
6	Saudi Arabia	3.30
7	Jordan	3.40
8	Singapore	3.50
9	Brunei	3.70
10	Libya	3.70

World historical and predicted crude death rates (1950–2050) UN, medium variant, 2008 rev.
Years	CDR	Years	CDR
1950–1955	19.5	2000–2005	8.6
1955–1960	17.3	2005–2010	8.5
1960–1965	15.5	2010–2015	8.3
1965–1970	13.2	2015–2020	8.3
1970–1975	11.4	2020–2025	8.3
1975–1980	10.7	2025–2030	8.5
1980–1985	10.3	2030–2035	8.8
1985–1990	9.7	2035–2040	9.2
1990–1995	9.4	2040–2045	9.6
1995–2000	8.9	2045–2050	10

See list of countries by mortality rate for worldwide statistics.

According to the World Health Organization, the 10 leading causes of death in 2002 were:

1. 12.6% Ischemic heart disease
2. 9.7% Cerebrovascular disease
3. 6.8% Lower respiratory infections
4. 4.9% HIV/AIDS
5. 4.8% Chronic obstructive pulmonary disease
6. 3.2% Diarrhoeal diseases
7. 2.7% Tuberculosis
8. 2.2% Trachea/bronchus/lung cancers
9. 2.2% Malaria
10. 2.1% Road traffic accidents

Causes of death vary greatly between first and third world countries.

According to Jean Ziegler (the United Nations Special Rapporteur on the Right to Food for 2000 to March 2008), mortality due to malnutrition accounted for 58% of the total mortality in 2006: "In the world, approximately 62 millions people, all causes of death combined, die each year. In 2006, more than 36 millions died of hunger or diseases due to deficiencies in micronutrients".

Of the roughly 150,000 people who died each day across the globe, about two-thirds—100,000 per day—died of age-related causes in 2001, according to an article which counts all deaths "due to causes that kill hardly anyone under the age of 40" as age-related. In industrialized nations, the proportion was even higher according to that article, reaching 90%.

== Total fertility rate ==
The Total fertility rate is the average number of children born per mother. In 2021, fertility levels high were found in sub-Saharan Africa (4.6 births per woman), Oceania excluding Australia and New Zealand (3.1), Northern Africa and Western Asia (2.8), and Central and Southern Asia (2.3).

There is an inverse correlation between income and fertility, wherein developed countries usually have a much lower fertility rate. Various fertility factors may be involved, such as education and urbanization. Mortality rates are low, birth control is understood and easily accessible, and costs are often deemed very high because of education, clothing, feeding, and social amenities. With wealth, contraception becomes affordable. However, in countries like Iran where contraception was made artificially affordable before the economy accelerated, birth rate also rapidly declined. Further, longer periods of time spent getting higher education often mean women have children later in life. Female labor participation rate also has substantial negative impact on fertility. However, this effect is neutralized among Nordic or liberalist countries.

In undeveloped countries on the other hand, families desire children for their labour and as caregivers for their parents in old age. Fertility rates are also higher due to the lack of access to contraceptives, generally lower levels of female education, patriarchal culture and lower rates of female employment in industry.

Total fertility rates by region, 2010–2015

Total fertility rate is the number of children born per woman.

Region	Total fertility rate (2010–2015)
World	2.5
Africa	4.7
Sub-Saharan Africa	5.1
Western Africa	5.5
Middle Africa	5.8
Eastern Africa	4.9
Northern Africa	3.3
Southern Africa	2.5
Oceania	2.4
Asia	2.2
Europe	1.6
Latin America-Caribbean	2.2
North America	1.9

== Health ==
Life expectancy (as of 2016) varies greatly from country to country. It is lowest in certain countries in Africa and higher in Japan, Australia and Spain.: >80 77.5–80 75–77.5 72.5–75 70–72.5 / 67.5–70 65–67.5 60–65 55–60 50–55

The average number of hospital beds per 1,000 population is 2.94. It is highest in Switzerland (18.3) and lowest in Mexico (1.1)

96% of the urban population has access to improved drinking water, while only 78% of rural inhabitants have improved drinking water. A total average of 87% of urban and rural have access to improved drinking water.

76% of the urban population has access to sanitation facilities, while only 45% of the rural population has access. A total world average of 39% do not have access to sanitation facilities.

As of 2009, there are an estimated 33.3 million people living with HIV/AIDS, which is approximately 0.8% of the world population, and there have been an estimated 1.8 million deaths attributed to HIV/AIDS.

As of 2010, 925 million people are undernourished.

Life Expectancy at Birth:

- total population: 71.4 years
- male: 69.1 years
- female: 73.8 years (2015 est.)

World historical and predicted total life expectancy at birth (1950–2050) UN, 2017 rev.
Years	LEB	Years	LEB
1950–1955	47.9	2000–2005	67.2
1955–1960	49.3	2005–2010	69.1
1960–1965	51.2	2010–2015	70.8
1965–1970	55.5	2015–2020	72.0
1970–1975	58.1	2020–2025	73.0
1975–1980	60.3	2025–2030	73.8
1980–1985	62.1	2030–2035	74.7
1985–1990	63.7	2035–2040	75.5
1990–1995	64.6	2040–2045	76.2
1995–2000	65.7	2045–2050	77.0

== Sex ratio ==
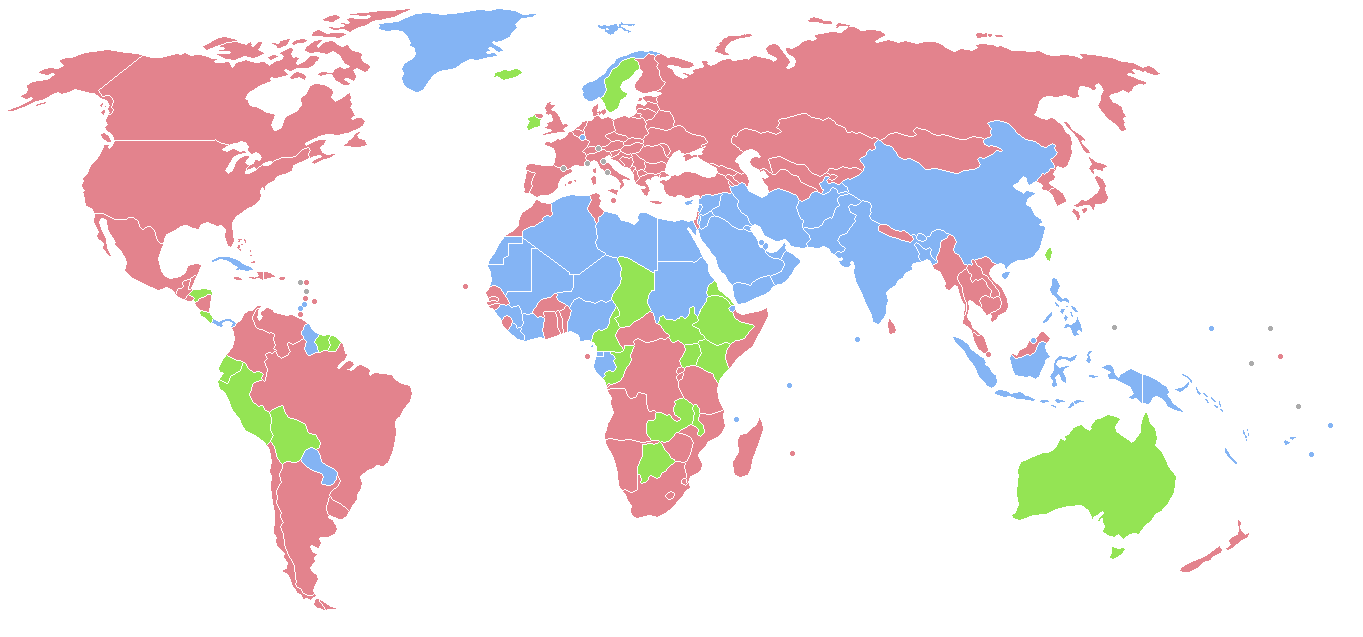
Map indicating the human sex ratio by country. Countries with more females than males. Countries with similar number of males and females. Countries with more males than females. No data

The value for the entire world population is 1.02 males/female, with 1.07 at birth, 1.06 for those under 15, 1.02 for those between 15 and 64, and 0.78 for those over 65.

The Northern Mariana Islands have the highest female ratio with 0.77 males per female. Qatar has the highest male ratio, with 2.87 males/female. For the group aged below 15, Sierra Leone has the highest female ratio with 0.96 males/female, and Georgia and China are tied for the highest male ratio with 1.13 males/female (according to the 2006 CIA World Factbook).

The "First World" G7 members all have a gender ratio in the range of 0.95–0.98 for the total population, of 1.05–1.07 at birth, of 1.05–1.06 for the group below 15, of 1.00–1.04 for the group aged 15–64, and of 0.70–0.75 for those over 65.

Countries on the Arabian Peninsula tend to have a "natural" ratio of about 1.05 at birth but a very high ratio of males for those over 65 (Saudi Arabia 1.13, United Arab Emirates 2.73, Qatar 2.84), indicating either an above-average mortality rate for females or a below-average mortality for males, or, more likely in this case, a large population of aging male guest workers. Conversely, countries of Eastern Europe (the Baltic states, Belarus, Ukraine, Russia) tend to have a "normal" ratio at birth but a very low ratio of males among those over 65 (Russia 0.46, Latvia 0.48, Ukraine 0.52); similarly, Armenia has a far above average male ratio at birth (1.17), and a below-average male ratio above 65 (0.67). This effect may be caused by emigration and higher male mortality as result of higher post-Soviet era deaths; it may also be related to the enormous (by western standards) rate of alcoholism in the former Soviet states. Another possible contributory factor is an aging population, with a higher than normal proportion of relatively elderly people: we recall that due to higher differential mortality rates the ratio of males to females reduces for each year of age.

== Unemployment rate ==
8.7% (2010 est.) 8.2% (2009 est.) note: 30% combined unemployment and underemployment in many non-industrialized countries; developed countries typically 4%–12% unemployment (2007 est.)

== Languages ==
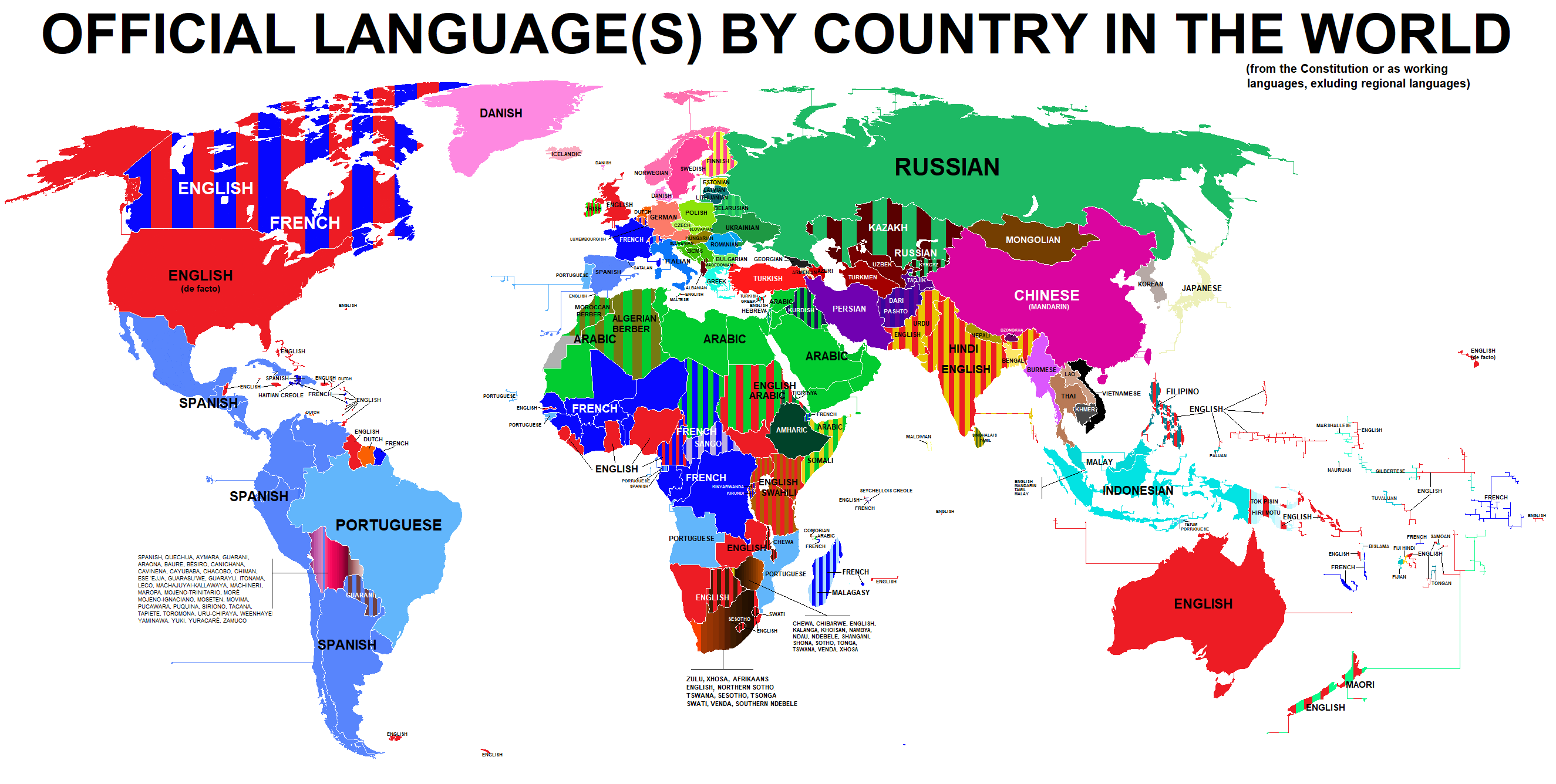
Official language is by country in the world

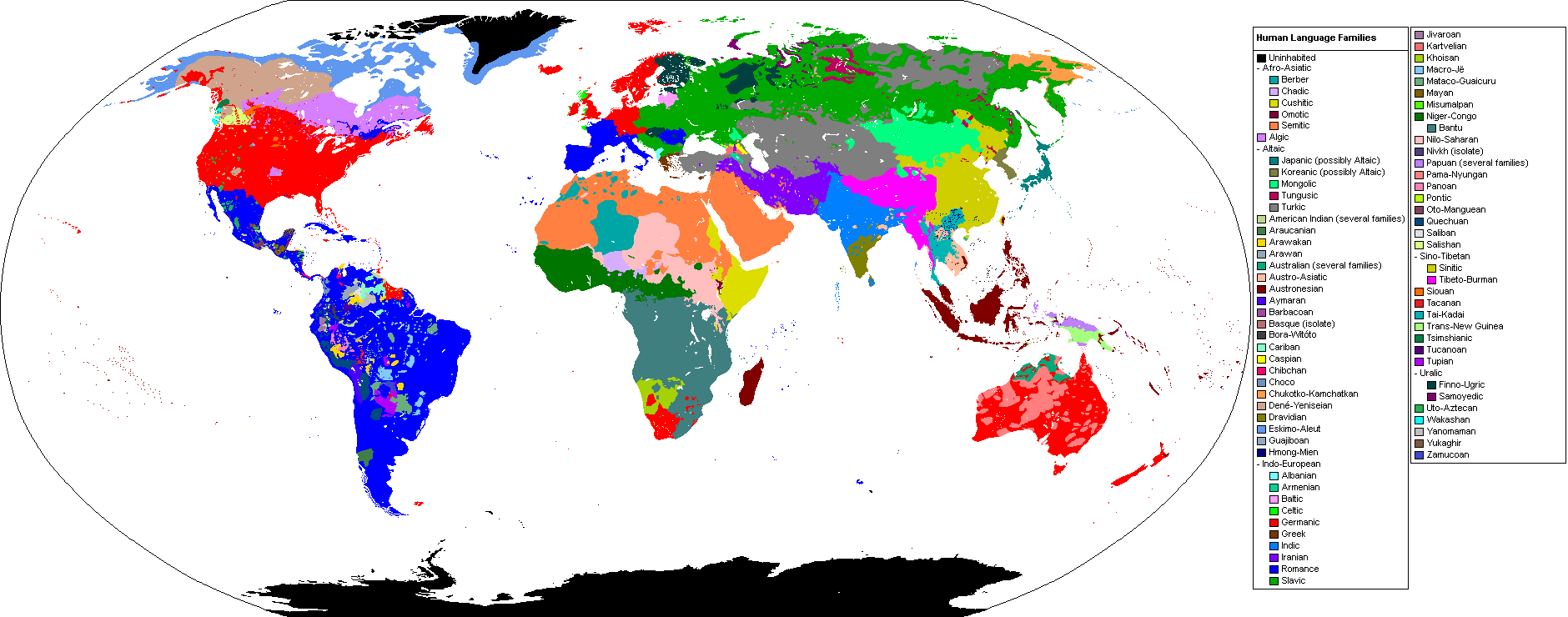
Map of the human language families

Worldwide, English is used widely as a lingua franca and can be seen to be the dominant language at this time. The world's largest language by native speakers is Mandarin Chinese which is a first language of around 1.1 billion people, or 12.44% of the population, predominantly in Greater China. Spanish is spoken by around 330 to 400 million people, predominantly in the Americas and Spain. Hindustani (Hindi–Urdu) is spoken by about 370 to 420 million speakers, mostly in India and Pakistan.

Arabic is spoken by around 350 million people predominantly in Arab world. Bengali is spoken by around 250 million people worldwide, predominantly in Bangladesh and India. Portuguese is spoken by about 230 million speakers in Portugal, Brazil, East Timor, and Southern Africa.

There are numerous other languages, grouped into nine major families:

1. Indo-European languages 46% (Europe, Western Asia, South Asia, North Asia, North America, South America, and Oceania)
2. Sino-Tibetan languages 21% (East Asia, Mainland Southeast Asia, and South Asia)
3. Niger–Congo languages 6.4% (Sub-Saharan Africa)
4. Afroasiatic languages 6.0% (North Africa to Horn of Africa, and Western Asia)
5. Austronesian languages 5.9% (Oceania, Madagascar, and Maritime Southeast Asia)
6. Dravidian languages 3.7% (South Asia)
7. Altaic languages (controversial combination of Turkic, Mongolic, and Tungusic families) 2.3% (Central Asia, North Asia (Siberia), and Anatolia) (Note: Since the Mongolic and Tungusic language families have only a relatively small number of speakers, the majority of the Altaic percentage represents speakers of Turkic languages.)
8. Austroasiatic languages 1.7% (Mainland Southeast Asia)
9. Kra–Dai languages 1.3% (Southeast Asia)

There are also hundreds of non-verbal sign languages.

== Education ==
World map of countries shaded according to the literacy rate for all people aged 15 and over, as of 2015.

As of 2008, the school life expectancy (primary to tertiary education) for a man or woman is 11 years.

== See also ==
- Demographics of Africa
- Demographics of Antarctica
- Demographics of Asia
- Demographics of Europe
- Demographics of North America
  - List of Caribbean countries by population
- Demographics of Oceania
- Demographics of South America
- World population
