= Fertility and intelligence =

Relationship that has been the focus of demographic studies

The relationship between fertility and intelligence has been investigated in many demographic studies. There is evidence that, on a population level, measures of intelligence such as educational attainment and literacy are negatively correlated with fertility rate in some contexts.

== Early views and research ==
The negative correlation between fertility and intelligence (as measured by IQ) has been argued to be persistent and systematic in many parts of the modern West in particular. Early studies, however, are sometimes claimed to have been "superficial and illusory" and not clearly supported by the limited data they collected.

Some of the first studies into the subject were carried out on individuals living before the advent of IQ testing, in the late 19th century, by looking at the fertility of men listed in Who's Who, these individuals being presumably of high intelligence. These men, taken as a whole, had few children, implying a correlation. This common objection, however, does not clearly apply to all studies of the time period. Educational psychologist and peace researcher Theodore Lentz wrote in 1927 that "The correlation between I.Q. and number of children in a family varies from -.095 in one community to -.41 in another", and expressed concern that this might be evidence for a dysgenic trend.

More rigorous studies carried out on Americans alive after the Second World War returned different results suggesting a slight positive correlation with respect to intelligence. The findings from these investigations were consistent enough for Osborn and Bajema, (Note: An author also notable for related studies on the matter.) writing as late as 1972, to conclude that fertility patterns were eugenic, and that "the reproductive trend toward an increase in the frequency of genes associated with higher IQ [...] will probably continue in the foreseeable future in the United States and will be found also in other industrial welfare-state democracies." (Note: This sudden lack of a dysgenic pattern was corroborated even by some researchers whose later involvement in the race and intelligence controversy makes the respective ideological bias on their part somewhat unlikely, for example in a study by psychologist Audrey M. Shuey.)

Several reviewers considered the findings premature, arguing that the samples were nationally unrepresentative, generally being confined to white people born between 1910 and 1940 in the Great Lakes States. Other researchers began to report a negative correlation in the 1960s after two decades of neutral or positive fertility.

In 1982, Daniel R. Vining, Jr. sought to address these issues in a large study on the fertility of over 10,000 individuals throughout the United States, who were then aged 25 to 34. The average fertility in his study was correlated at −0.031 with IQ for white women and −0.086 for black women. Vining argued that this indicated a drop in the genotypic average IQ of 1.6 points per generation for the white population, and 2.4 points per generation for the black population. Critics note Vining's involvement with the white supremacist journal Mankind Quarterly and his acceptance of grants from the Pioneer Fund.

== Later research ==
In a 1988 study, Retherford and Sewell examined the association between the measured intelligence and fertility of over 9,000 high school graduates in Wisconsin in 1957, and confirmed the inverse relationship between IQ and fertility for both sexes, but much more so for females. If children had, on average, the same IQ as their parents, IQ would decline by .81 points per generation. Taking .71 for the additive heritability of IQ as given by behavioural geneticists John L. Jinks and David Fulker, they calculated a dysgenic decline of .57 IQ points per generation. In a subsequent attempt of theirs to more definitively identify the exact causal grounds of these observations, they argued, that "[p]ath analysis shows that the effects of IQ on subsequent family size are almost entirely indirect through education".

Accordingly, it often proved useful to rely on educational attainment alone in such correlation studies insofar as it is known to be a relatively good proxy for IQ, correlating with it at circa .55. Conducting a study along such lines and therefore retrieving a correspondingly larger national sample, David C. Rowe and colleagues (1999) found not only that achieved education had a high heritability (.68) and that half of the variance in education was explained by an underlying genetic component shared by IQ, education, and SES. One study investigating fertility and education carried out in 1991 found that high school dropouts in the United States had the most children (2.5 on average), with high school graduates having fewer children, and college graduates having the fewest children (1.56 on average).

Herrnstein and Murray, in their best-selling 1994 book The Bell Curve, argued that the average genotypic IQ of the United States was declining due to both dysgenetic fertility and large scale immigration of groups with ex hypothesi lower average IQ than the previous population mean. (Note: A massively controversial 2012 paper by Helmuth Nyborg further systematized the same overall hypothesis of this two-pronged dysgenic threat purported to be of particular danger to Western societies.)

Controversial psychologist Richard Lynn has been a well-known advocate for the validity of dysgenic hypotheses under modern conditions. In a 1999 study, he examined the relationship between the intelligence of adults aged 40 and above with their respective numbers of children such as siblings, positing that "correlations were found to be significantly negative at -0.05 and -0.09 respectively, indicating the presence of dysgenic fertility." (Note: The data having been retrieved from a 1994 National Opinion Research Center survey among a representative sample of 2992 English-speaking individuals aged 18 years.) Furthermore, reporting that there was virtually no correlation between women's intelligence and the number of children they considered ideal, he surprisingly observed that this negative correlation held true only for women. In 2004, Lynn and Marian Van Court attempted a straightforward replication of Vining's work. Their study returned similar results, with the genotypic decline measuring at 0.9 IQ points per generation for the total sample and 0.75 IQ points for whites only. (Note: However, Lynn's research has been widely criticized as pseudo-scientific and having poor research practices, as well as for promoting scientific racism and white supremacy, particularly with regards to Lynn's status as editor-in-chief of the journal Mankind Quarterly culminating in the revocation of his title as professor emeritus of Psychology at Ulster University in 2018.)

A 2014 paper by similarly controversial evolutionary psychologist Satoshi Kanazawa, using data from the National Child Development Study, found that more intelligent women and men were, in fact, both more likely to want to be childless, but that only more intelligent women – not men – were more likely to actually be childless.

It is helpful to exclude some confounding variables from adjacent research regarding the correlation of fertility and income. In a 2006 statistical analysis of the US General Social Survey, it was found that higher relative income indeed led to both a greater frequency of sex and greater fecundity in men. (Note: In fact a pattern that some argue to have been one of the few universals of recent human evolution by means of sexual selection.) Nonetheless, intelligence and fertility were shown to remain negatively correlated throughout. This exact asymmetry was again replicated based on data from National Longitudinal Surveys. Population economist Vegard Skirbekk on the other hand had already argued on the grounds of another large multi-national dataset that this characteristic "status-fertility relation" had long since stalled or even reversed for males just as well.

Criminologist Brian Boutwell et al. (2013) reported a strong negative association between county-level IQ and county-level fertility rates in the United States. (Note: Similar research was also conducted across some 33 Indian states indicating a comparably negative correlation of intelligence with infant mortality and fertility respectively.)

== Possible causes ==
=== Economic development ===
A theory to explain the fertility-intelligence relationship is that while income and IQ are positively correlated, income is also in itself a fertility factor that correlates inversely with fertility, that is, the higher the incomes, the lower the fertility rates and vice versa. There is thus an inverse correlation between income and fertility within and between nations. The higher the level of education and GDP per capita of a human population, sub-population or social stratum, the fewer children are born. In a 1974 UN population conference in Bucharest, Karan Singh, a former minister of population in India, encapsulated this relationship by stating "Development is the best contraceptive".

=== Education ===
In most countries, education is inversely correlated to childbearing. People often delay childbearing in order to spend more time getting education, and thus have fewer children. Conversely, early childbearing can interfere with education, so people with early or frequent childbearing are likely to be less educated. While education and childbearing place competing demands on a person's resources, education is positively correlated with IQ.

While there is less research into men's fertility and education, in developed countries evidence suggests that highly-educated men display higher levels of childbearing compared to less-educated men.

As a country becomes more developed, education rates increase and fertility rates decrease for both men and women. Fertility has fallen faster for both less-educated men and women than it has for highly-educated men and women. In the Nordic countries of Denmark, Norway, and Sweden, fertility for less-educated women has now fallen enough that childlessness is now highest among the least educated women just as it is for men.

=== Birth control and intelligence ===
Among a sample of women using birth control methods of comparable theoretical effectiveness, success rates were related to IQ, with the percentages of high, medium and low IQ women having unwanted births during a three-year interval being 3%, 8% and 11%, respectively. Since the effectiveness of many methods of birth control is directly correlated with proper usage, an alternative interpretation of the data would indicate lower IQ women were less likely to use birth control consistently and correctly. Another study found that after an unwanted pregnancy has occurred, higher IQ couples are more likely to obtain abortions; and unmarried teenage girls who become pregnant are found to be more likely to carry their babies to term if they are doing poorly in school.

Conversely, while desired family size in the United States is apparently the same for women of all IQ levels, highly educated women are found to be more likely to say that they desire more children than they have, indicating a "deficit fertility" in the highly intelligent. In her review of reproductive trends in the United States, Van Court argues that "each factor – from initially employing some form of contraception, to successful implementation of the method, to termination of an accidental pregnancy when it occurs – involves selection against intelligence."

== Contested relevance ==
Regardless of whether correlations exist between fertility and intelligence, genetic studies have shown no evidence for dysgenic effects in human populations. Additionally, theories about dysgenic and eugenic effects in human populations are associated with scientific racism.

Preston and Campbell (1993) argued that it is a mathematical fallacy that differences in fertility would result in a progressive change of IQ, and that such changes apply only when looking at closed subpopulations. In their mathematical model, with constant differences in fertility, since children's IQ can be more or less than that of their parents, a steady-state equilibrium is argued to be established between different subpopulations with different IQ. The mean IQ will not change in the absence of a change of the fertility differences. The steady-state IQ distribution will be lower for negative differential fertility than for positive, but these differences are small. For the extreme and unrealistic assumption of endogamous mating in IQ subgroups, a differential fertility change of 2.5/1.5 to 1.5/2.5 (high IQ/low IQ) causes a maximum shift of four IQ points. For random mating, the shift is less than one IQ point. James Samuel Coleman, formerly president of the ASA, economist David Lam both independently argued that this model depends on various assumptions which are unlikely to be true.

Recent research has shown that education and socioeconomic status are better indicators of fertility and suggests that the relationship between intelligence and number of children may be spurious. When controlling for education and socioeconomic status, the relationship between intelligence and number of children, intelligence and number of siblings, and intelligence and ideal number of children reduces to statistical insignificance. Among women, a post-hoc analysis revealed that the lowest and highest intelligence scores did not differ significantly by number of children.

== See also ==
- Income and fertility – correlations within and between countries
- Fertility factor (demography)
- List of countries and territories by fertility rate
