= Fertility factor =

Fertility factor may refer to:

- Fertility factor (demography)
- Opposites of infertility causes (in medicine)
- Fertility factor (bacteria)
