= Skirbekk =

Skirbekk is a surname. Notable people with the surname include:

- Geir Skirbekk (born 1962), Norwegian sport shooter
- Gunnar Skirbekk (born 1937), Norwegian philosopher.
- Vegard Skirbekk, Norwegian population economist and social scientist
