= Global Social Change Research Project =

The Global Social Change Research Project is a project devoted to bringing a clear understanding to the general public about social change. They have reports about social, political, economic, demographic and technological change throughout the world.

== History of the project ==
This project was started shortly before 2000. Since the project started producing reports, their reports have been cited in a wide variety of academic topics, such as general global social and economic transformation, economic inequality, macromarketing, gender and rural development, organizational change, capitalism, tourism, economic growth, urban sustainability, regionalism and policy and especially in the area of quality of life.

In addition to producing social change reports, staff from the project have written on applied sociology throughout the world, conducted research about China, and reviewed books on various topics such as applied statistics for public policy, democracy and governance and history.

Reports from the project have been cited by a number of texts and studies, such as a course on sustainable development, a chapter in a book on transnational education, a chapter in a book on demographic changes and tourism, and a paper on political regimes and education.

== Major areas of study ==
Some of the major reports from the study describe available indicators on the web to measure quality of life or progress of the world. Reports in 2011 showed that world population growth was slowing, and that inequality in infant mortality rates between developing and developed countries was declining, mainly because infant mortality rates among developed countries had become very low, and so stopped declining.

== Reports ==
One of the main conclusions from the population trend reports is that from 1950 to 2010, the distribution of world population changed significantly. The largest change was that Africa and Latin America and the Caribbean increased from 17.3% to 25% of the world population while Northern America and Europe declined from 22.7% to 12.4%. Asia changed little, only increasing from 60% of world population to 63%.
