= Income and fertility =

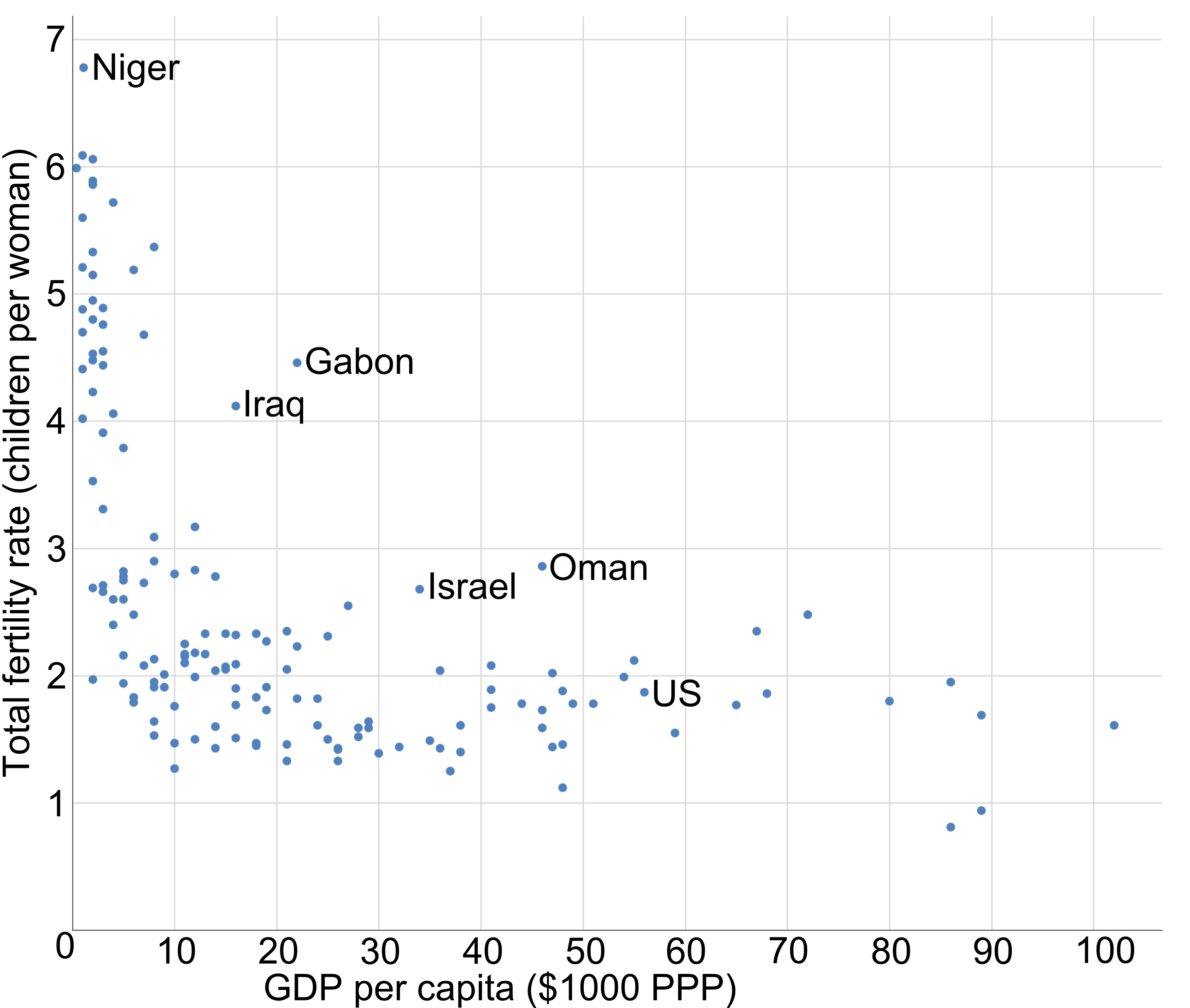
Graph of total fertility rate vs. GDP (PPP) per capita of the corresponding country, 2015

There is generally an inverse correlation between monetary income and the total fertility rate within and between nations. The higher the degree of education and GDP per capita of a human population, subpopulation or social stratum, the fewer children are born in any developed country. In a 1974 United Nations population conference in Bucharest, Karan Singh, a former minister of population in India, illustrated this trend by stating "Development is the best contraceptive." In 2015, this thesis was supported by Vogl, T.S., who concluded that increasing the cumulative educational attainment of a generation of parents was by far the most important predictor of the inverse correlation between income and fertility based on a sample of 48 developing countries.

Generally a developed country has a lower fertility rate while a less economically developed country has a higher fertility rate. For example the total fertility rate for Japan, a developed country with per capita GDP of US$32,600 in 2009, was 1.22 children born per woman. But total fertility rate in Ethiopia, with a per capita GDP of $900 in 2009, was 6.17 children born per woman.

== Demographic–economic paradox ==
Herwig Birg has called the inverse relationship between income and fertility a "demo-economic paradox". Evolutionary biology predicts that more successful individuals (and by analogy countries) should seek to develop optimum conditions for their life and reproduction. However, in the last half of the 20th century it has become clear that the economic success of developed countries is being counterbalanced by a demographic failure, a sub-replacement fertility that may prove destructive for their future economies and societies.

== Causes and related factors ==
It is hypothesized that the observed trend in many countries of having fewer children has come about as a response to increased life expectancy, reduced child mortality, improved female literacy and independence, and urbanization that all result from increased GDP per capita, consistent with the demographic transition model. The increase in GDP in Eastern Europe after 1990 has been correlated with childbearing postponement and a sharp decline in fertility.

In developed countries where birth control is the norm, increased income is likewise associated with decreased fertility. Theories behind this include:

- People earning more have a higher opportunity cost if they focus on childbirth and parenting rather than their continued career.
- Women who can economically sustain themselves have less incentive to become married.
- Higher-income parents value quality over quantity and so spend their resources on fewer children.

From the 1970s to the late 2000s, parental spending increased. At the same time, investment in male and female children changed substantially: in the early 1970s, households with only female children spent significantly less than parents in households with only male children, but by the 1990s spending had equalized, and by the late 2000s girls gained an advantage. In addition, before the 1990s, parents spent the most on children in their teens. After the 1990s, however, the highest spending was on children under age 6 and in their mid-20s. The motives for the increase in parental investment in children, both in terms of financial and time investment are diverse. Anne H. Gauthier and Petra W. de Jong evidence that for middle-income parents in Canada and the US these motives are the goal of providing children with human and social capital to improve their future labor market prospects, the pressures on parents to conform to new societal standards of good and intensive parenting, and the experience of parenting as part of self-development. Philip H. Brown analyzed parenting patterns in rural China and found that more educated parents make greater educational investments in both goods and time with the objective of higher returns to education for children.

Religion sometimes modifies the effect; higher income is associated with slightly increased fertility among Catholic couples but is associated with slightly decreased fertility among Protestant couples. Scholars also find a link between the European Marriage Pattern, which is marked by comparatively late marriage and consequently decreased fertility, and the economic growth. This demographic pattern is considered to influence the stock of human capital and thus to contribute to Western Europe's development advantage.

Ansley Coale's Three Preconditions for Decline in Fertility asserts that increases in a society's income may increase its fertility, but only if three preconditions are met, summarized as "ready, willing and able". People will respond to economic and social opportunities that make it advantageous to limit fertility, considering the economic and psychosocial costs such as the cost of birth control or abortions.

The review of the application of the traditional micro-economic models to the analysis of fertility decisions shows that, from economic point of view, children either are considered to yield utility directly, or are not desired for themselves, but are by-products of sexual activity or investment goods.

== Consequences ==
Demographic transition#cite note-DemenyAndMcNicoll-1

Across countries there is a strong negative correlation between gross domestic product and fertility, and ultimately it is proven that a strong negative correlation exists between household income and fertility.

A reduction in fertility can lead to an aging population, which can lead to a variety of problems, as with the demographics of Japan.

Some scholars have observed a dramatic increase in the proportion of young adults living with their parents in Mediterranean Europe. This is a worrisome trend, since this shift in the timing of adulthood could seriously affect the labor supply of young people, overall fertility rates, and European pay-as-you-go pension systems. This fact indicates that declining fertility rates in advanced economies may tend to be self-reinforcing and further exacerbate the situation.

A related concern is that high birth rates tend to place a greater burden of child rearing and education on populations already struggling with poverty. Consequently, inequality lowers average education and hampers economic growth. Also, in countries with a high burden of this kind, a reduction in fertility can hamper economic growth as well as the other way around. Richer countries have a lower fertility rate than poorer ones, and high income families have fewer kids than low-income ones.

== Contrary findings ==
Every country could differ in their respective relationship between income and fertility. Some countries show that income and fertility are directly related but other countries show a directly inverse relationship.

A United Nations report in 2002 came to the conclusion that sharp declines in fertility rates in India, Nigeria, and Mexico occurred despite low levels of economic development.

Vogl, T.S. provided the evidence that associations between income and fertility or between sibship size and education, that used to be positive in developing countries in the 20th century, recently became negative: first in Latin America, then in Asia, and finally in Africa. This is mainly explained by increased education levels.

Fertility declines have been seen during economic recessions. This phenomenon is seen as a result of pregnancy postponement, especially of first births. But this effect can be short-term and largely compensated for during later times of economic prosperity.

Increased unemployment is generally associated with lower fertility. Nonetheless, in the years after the revolutions of 1989 in Russia, people who were more affected by labour market crises seemed to have a higher probability of having another child than those who were less affected. A study in France came to the result that employment instability has a strong and persistent negative effect on the final number of children for both men and women and contributes to fertility postponement for men. It also came to the result that employment instability has a negative influence on fertility among those with more egalitarian views about the division of labor but still a positive influence for women with more traditional views. This can be explained by the fact that countries with more traditional views of women's roles generally tend to have lower female labor force participation and higher fertility rates.

Another possible factor of lower fertility rates is culture. Numerous studies show that culture and ethnicity play a quantitatively significant role in explaining variation in women's work and fertility outcomes. Simultaneously, culture has a causal effect on economic development. Such cultural traits as having trust in other people, appreciating the virtue of having tolerance and respect for others in children, feeling in control of one's life, and appreciating obedience in one's own children appear to be favorable to economic development. Thus, the relationship between income and fertility may be not direct, but determined by a common root – cultural characteristics.

Mass culture can also influence people's attitudes toward having large families. For instance, in Brazil, where soap operas depict small families, women living in areas covered by the largest soap opera producer have significantly lower fertility rates. This effect is strongest among women of low socioeconomic status and in the central and late phases of fertility.

Two recent studies in the United States show, that in some circumstances, families whose income has increased will have more children. This may be explained by Fertility J-curve.

=== Fertility J-curve ===
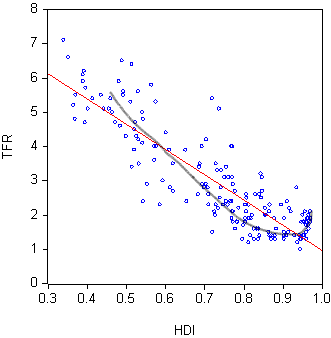
TFR vs HDI showing "J curve", from UN Human Development Report 2009

Some scholars have recently questioned the assumption that economic development and fertility are correlated in a simple negative manner. A study published in Nature in 2009 found that when using the Human Development Index instead of the GDP as measure for economic development, fertility follows a J-shaped curve: with rising economic development, fertility rates indeed do drop at first but then begin to rise again as the level of social and economic development increases while still remaining below the replacement rate.

In an article published in Nature, Myrskylä et al. pointed out that "unprecedented increases" in social and economic development in the 20th century had been accompanied by considerable declines in population growth rates and fertility. This negative association between human fertility and socio-economic development has been "one of the most solidly established and generally accepted empirical regularities in the social sciences". The researchers used cross-sectional and longitudinal analyses to examine the relationship between total fertility rate (TFR) and the human development index (HDI).

The main finding of the study was that, in highly developed countries with an HDI above 0.9, further development halts the declining fertility rates. This means that the previously negative development-fertility association is reversed; the graph becomes J-shaped. Myrskylä et al. contend that there has occurred "a fundamental change in the well-established negative relationship between fertility and development as the global population entered the twenty-first century".

Some researchers doubt J-shaped relationship fertility and socio-economic development (Luci and Thevenon, 2010; Furuoka, 2009). For example, Fumitaka Furuoka (2009) employed a piecewise regression analysis to examine the relationship between total fertility rate and human development index. However, he found no empirical evidence to support the proposition that advances in development are able to reverse declining fertility rates. More precisely, he found that in countries with a low human development index, higher levels of HDI tend to be associated with lower fertility rates. Likewise, in countries with a high human development index, higher levels of HDI are associated with lower fertility rates, although the relationship is weaker. Furuoka's findings support the "conventional wisdom" that higher development is consistently correlated with lower overall fertility.

An update of Myrskylä et al.'s work has also found that declines in national fertility between 2010 and 2018 mean that there is now no long-term association between very high levels of development and sustained fertility rebounds.

== The Easterlin hypothesis ==
The "Easterlin hypothesis" (Easterlin 1961, 1969, 1973) states that the positive relationship between income and fertility is dependent on relative income. It is considered the first viable and a still leading explanation for mid-twentieth century baby booms.

The hypothesis as formulated by Richard Easterlin presumes that material aspirations are determined by experiences rooted in family background: he assumes first that young couples try to achieve a standard of living equal to or better than they had when they grew up. This is called "relative status". If income is high relative to aspirations and jobs are plentiful, it will be easier to marry young and have more children and still match that standard of living. But when jobs are scarce, couples who try to keep that standard of living will wait to get married and have fewer children. Children are normal goods once this influence of family background is controlled. For Easterlin, the size of the cohort is a critical determinant of how easy it is to get a good job. A small cohort means less competition, a large cohort means more competition to worry about. The assumptions blend economics and sociology.

Easterlin's hypothesis can also be used for further predictions of the fertility rate. Easterlin expected a new fertility boom beginning in the 1980s.

== See also ==
- Advanced maternal age
- Fertility and intelligence
- Fertility factor (demography)
- Population growth
- Sub-replacement fertility
- Total fertility rate
