= Daniel Vining Jr. =

American demographer (born 1944)

- Education: Yale University, Princeton University, Carnegie Mellon University
- Scientific career
- Fields: Demography
- Workplaces: University of Pennsylvania
- Thesis: Models of Urban and Spatial Concentration (1975)

Daniel Rutledge Vining Jr. (born January 12, 1944 – 19 April 2026, Fayetteville, Arkansas) is an American demographer who has been an emeritus professor at the University of Pennsylvania since 2010.

== Education and career ==
He was the son of Daniel Rutledge Vining, who was economics professor at the University of Arkansas, Fayetteville, and the University of Virginia, Charlottesville. Vining received his B.A. degree from Yale University in 1966, his M.P.A. from the Woodrow Wilson School of Public and International Affairs at Princeton University in 1971, and his Ph.D. from the Carnegie Mellon University School of Urban and Public Affairs in 1975. In 1974, he was named a lecturer in the Regional Science Department at the University of Pennsylvania, where he became an assistant professor in 1975 and a tenured associate professor in 1980. In 1981, he was named an associate professor of public and urban policy for three years retroactive to July 1, 1980. He remained an associate professor at the University of Pennsylvania until 1993, and became an emeritus professor there in 2010.

== Research ==
Vining has argued that the average IQ of Americans has decreased by about 5 points since IQ tests became widely used in the early 20th century. He has also argued that wealthy families tend to have as many, or fewer, children than do low-income families, which he has argued occurs because human reproductive behavior is learned, not heritable.

== Controversial views and affiliations ==
Vining has previously been an editorial board member of the scientific racist journal Mankind Quarterly, and he has argued that America is undergoing a "dysgenesis" because more intelligent people in America are not reproducing as often. He has also asserted that this "dysgenesis" is especially harmful to African Americans. His work was cited in the prominent 1994 book the Bell Curve, and he has received $197,750 in grants from the Pioneer Fund, for which he has been criticized as a "race scientist". Vining has responded to these criticisms by saying that the media has unfairly characterized him and the Pioneer Fund.
