= Vegard Skirbekk =

Norwegian economist and scientist

- Born: Norway
- Citizenship: Norwegian
- Education: Rostock University (2005); University of Oslo (1999, 2001)
- Scientific career
- Fields: Demographic analysis Productivity and age/cohort variation Fertility analyses Life cycle and generational variation in cognition
- Workplaces: Norwegian Institute of Public Health; Columbia University

Vegard Skirbekk is a Norwegian population economist and social scientist specializing in demographic analysis and cohort studies. He is a senior researcher at the Norwegian Institute of Public Health and also Professor of Population and Family Health at the Columbia Aging Center at Columbia University.

== Background ==
Skirbekk graduated in economics from the University of Oslo, Norway in 2001, also having studied at the University of Adelaide, Australia. He was awarded a PhD at Rostock University, Germany in 2005. In 2000–2001 Skirbekk participated in the Advanced Studies Program in International Economics at the Institute for World Economics in Kiel, Germany. From 2001 to 2003 he worked at the Max Planck Institute for Demographic Research in Rostock, Germany where he studied consequences of population ageing. In 2009 he was awarded the ERC "Starting Grant" which allowed him to set up his own research team. As project leader of the Age and Cohort Change Project, he has worked on extending the understanding of global variation in skills and values along age, period and cohort-lines. His group has produced the first worldwide estimates of faith and beliefs (covering 199 countries) in a partnership with the Pew Research Center.

Skirbekk is the research director of the Centre for Fertility and Health.

== Research ==
Skirbekk has focused on studying health, productivity, and associated determinants from a multidisciplinary perspective with an emphasis on the role of changing labor market demands, technological and cultural changes as well as variation in the attitudes, beliefs, and competences of new cohorts. From considering productivity as an output variable (e.g., measured as value-added, salary levels), a key contribution of his research has been to highlight the integral role of productivity determinants (such as skills, health, and abilities). This research has helped change the focus of age-variation in productivity from something fixed to an entity that is to a greater extent modifiable. While earlier work typically used chronological age distributions to describe trends over time and variation between countries in how "old" they are, Skirbekk's research as shown that how old a population effectively is should be based on objective measures such as cognitive and physical functioning levels rather than chronological age. Accordingly, countries can be functionally younger even if they are demographically old based on objective measures rather than chronological age structures.

Skirbekk's research has been published in a variety of academic journals (including PNAS, Lancet, Science, Nature). and has been presented in popular science outlets New Scientist). His work has been discussed in media around the world, including The New York Times, the TV news channel CNN, and The Economist. According to the Google Scholar citation index, his single-authored 2004 article on "Age and individual productivity: A literature survey" ranks as one of the most cited articles ever in the field. His work on productivity and value change has been discussed in the general media, included in an editorial in the New York Times. His work with Pew Research Center regarding global religious forecasts has also appeared in the New York Times. In addition to newspapers and academic journals, Skirbekk's work has been prominently cited in central publications by international organizations, such as OECD, the UN World Economic and Social Survey, and the National Academy of Sciences.
