= Fertility factor (demography) =

Factors influencing the likelihood of a person having children

Fertility factors are determinants of the number of children that an individual is likely to have. Fertility factors are mostly positive or negative correlations without certain causations.

Factors associated with increased fertility include the intention to have children, remaining religiosity, general inter-generational transmission of values, high status of marriage and cohabitation, maternal and social support, rural residence, a small subset of pro-family social programs, low IQ, personality traits such as conscientiousness, and generally increased food production.

Factors generally associated with decreased fertility include rising income, value and attitude changes, education, female labor participation, population control, age, contraception, partner reluctance to child-bearing, infertility, pollution, and obesity.

== Factors associated with increased fertility ==
=== Intention ===
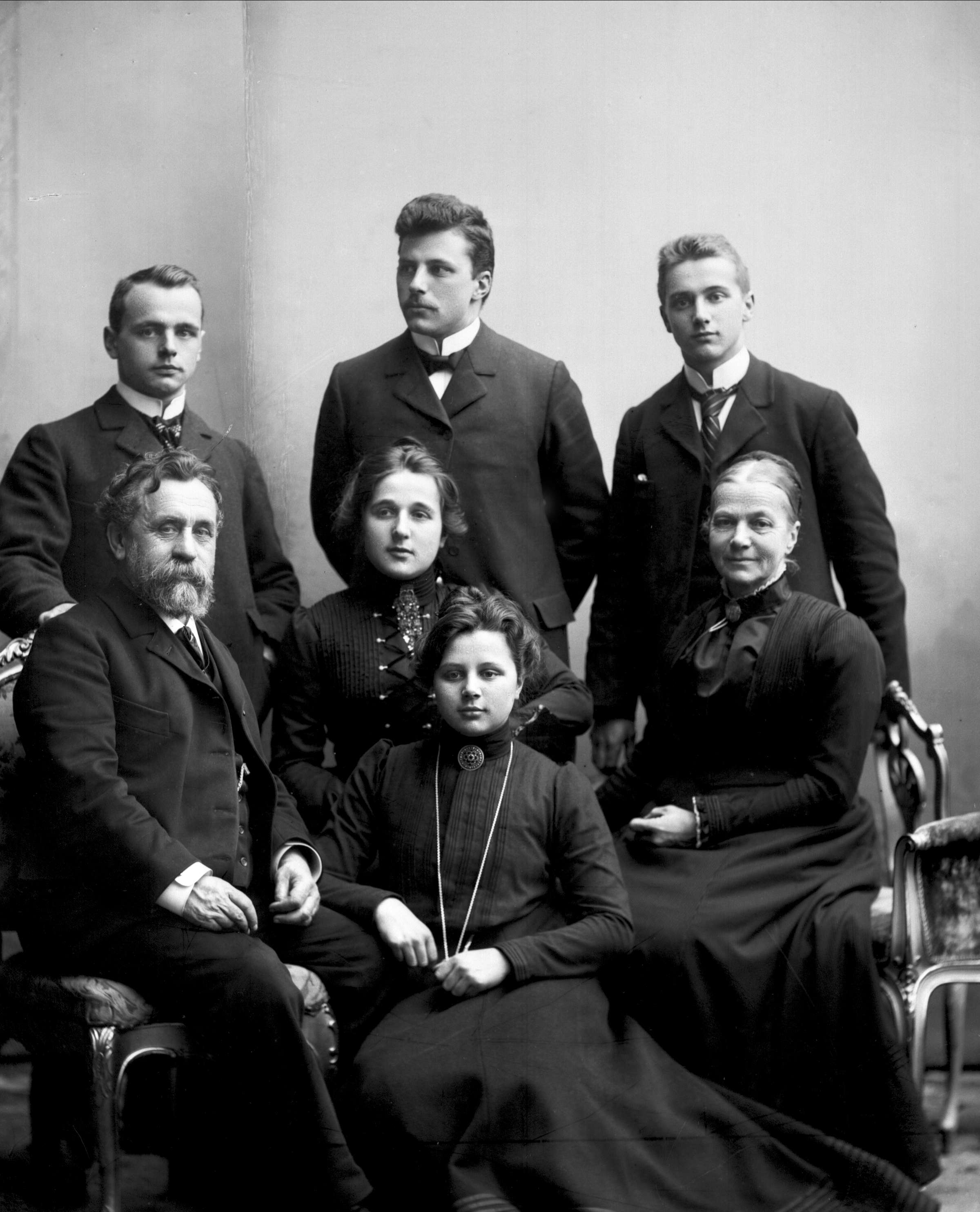
A Norwegian family c. 1900, parents plus five children

The predictive power of intentions continues to be debated. Research that argues that intentions are a good predictor of actual results tends to draw ideas from the theory of planned behavior (TPB). According to the TPB, intentions stem from three factors: attitudes regarding children, including the cost of raising them versus perceived benefits; subjective norms, for example the influence of others; and perceived control over behavior, that is, how much control an individual has over their own behavior.

Fertility intentions tend to boil down to quantum intentions, or how many children to bear, and tempo intentions, meaning when to have them. Of these, quantum intention is the poor predictor because it tends to change as a result of the ups and downs of a typical life. Tempo intention is a somewhat better predictor, but still a weak way to predict actual results.

The intention to have children generally increases the probability of having children. This relation is well evidenced in advanced societies, where birth control is the default option.

A comparison of a survey to birth registers in Norway found that parents were more likely to realize their fertility intentions than childless respondents. It was also suggested that childless individuals may underestimate the effort of having children. On the other hand, parents may better understand their ability to manage another child. Individuals intending to have children immediately are more likely to achieve this within two years, whereas in contrast, the fertility rate was found to be higher among those intending to have children in the long term (after four years). Stability of fertility intentions further improves the chance to realize them. Such stability is increased by the belief that having a child will improve life satisfaction and partner relationships.

Chances of realizing fertility intentions are lower in post-Soviet states than in Western European states.

There are many determinants of the intention to have children, including:

- The mother's preference of family size, which influences that of the children through early adulthood. Likewise, the extended family influences fertility intentions, with an increased number of nephews and nieces increasing the preferred number of children.
- Social pressure from kin and friends to have another child.
- Social support. A study from West Germany found that both men receiving no support at all and receiving support from many different people have a lower probability of intending to have another child than those with a moderate degree of support. The negative effect of support from many different people is probably related to coordination problems.
- Happiness, with happier people tending to want more children.
- A secure housing situation.
- Religiosity.

=== Fertility preference ===
The Preference Theory suggests that a woman's attitudes towards having children are shaped early in life. Furthermore, these attitudes tend to hold across the life course, and boil down to three main types: career-oriented, family-oriented, and a combination of both work and family. Research shows that family-oriented women have the most children, and work-oriented women have the least, or none at all, although causality remains unclear.

Preferences can also apply to the sex of the children born, and can therefore influence the decisions to have more children. For instance, if a couple's preference is to have at least one boy and one girl, and the first two children born are boys, there is a significantly high likelihood that the couple will opt to have another child.

=== Religiosity ===
A survey taken place in 2002 in the United States found that women who reported religion as "very important" in their everyday lives had a higher fertility than those reporting it as "somewhat important" or "not important".

For many religions, religiosity is directly associated with an increase in the intention to have children. This appears to be the main means by which religion increases fertility. For example, as of 1963, Catholic couples generally had intentions to have more children than Jewish couples, who in turn, tended to have more children than Protestant couples. Among Catholics, increased religiosity is associated with the intention to have more children, while on the other hand, increased religiousness among Protestants is associated with the intention to have fewer children.

It has also been suggested that religions generally encourage lifestyles with fertility factors that, in turn, increase fertility. For example, religious views on birth control are, in many religions, more restrictive than secular views, and such religious restrictions have been associated with increased fertility.

Religion sometimes modifies the fertility effects of education and income. Catholic education at the university level and the secondary school level was associated in 1963 with higher fertility, even when accounting for the confounding effect that higher religiosity leads to a higher probability of attending a religiously affiliated school. Higher income was also associated with slightly increased fertility among Catholic couples, however, was associated with slightly decreased fertility among Protestant couples.

Parents' religiosity is positively associated with their children's fertility. Therefore, more religious parents will tend to increase fertility.

A 2020 study found that the relation between religiosity and fertility was driven by the lower aggregate fertility of secular individuals. While religiosity did not prevent low fertility levels (as some highly religious countries had low fertility rates), secularism did prevent high fertility (as no highly secular country had high fertility rates). Societal level secularism was also a better predictor of religious individuals' fertility than secular individuals, largely due to the effects of cultural values on reproduction, gender and personal autonomy.

In the book Shall the Religious Inherit the Earth?, Eric Kaufmann argues that demographic trends point to religious fundamentalists greatly increasing as a share of the population over the next century. Other scholars have argued that this may be a form of "cultural selection" that will affect future demographics due to certain religious groups having high fertility that is unexplained by other factors such as income.

=== Intergenerational transmission of values ===
The transmission of values from parents to offspring (nurture) has been a core area of fertility research. The assumption is that parents transmit these family values, preferences, attitudes and religiosity to their children, all of which have long-term effects analogous to genetics. Researchers have tried to find a causal relationship between, for example, the number of parents' siblings and the number of children born by the parents own children (a quantum effect), or between the age of the first birth of the parents' generation and age of first birth of any of their own children (a tempo effect).

Most studies concerning tempo focus on teenage mothers and show that having had a young mother increases the likelihood of having a child at a young age.

In high-income countries, the number of children a person has strongly correlates with the number of children that each of those children will eventually have.

Danish data from non-identical twins growing up in the same environment compared to identical twins indicated that genetic influences in themselves largely override previously shared environmental influences. The birth order does not seem to have any effect on fertility.

Other studies, however, show that this effect can be balanced by the child's own attitudes that result from personal experiences, religiosity, education, etc. So, although the mother's preference of family size may influence that of the children through early adulthood, the child's own attitudes then take over and influence fertility decisions.

=== Marriage and cohabitation ===
The effect of cohabitation on fertility varies across countries.

In the US cohabitation is generally associated with lower fertility. However, another study found that cohabiting couples in France have equal fertility as married ones. Russians have also been shown to have a higher fertility within cohabitation.

Survey data from 2003 in Romania showed that marriage equalized the total fertility rate among both highly educated and limited-education people to approximately 1.4. Among those cohabiting, on the other hand, a lower level of education increased the fertility rate to 1.7, and a higher level of education decreased it to 0.7. Another study found that Romanian women with little education have about equal fertility in marital and cohabiting partnerships.

A study of the United States, and multiple countries in Europe, found that women who continue to cohabit after giving birth have a significantly lower probability of having a second child than married women in all countries, except those in Eastern Europe.

=== Maternal support ===
Data from the Generations and Gender Survey showed that women with living mothers had earlier first births, while a mother's death early in a daughter's life correlated with a higher probability of childlessness. On the other hand, the survival of fathers had no effect on either outcome. Co-residence with parents delayed first births and resulted in lower total fertility and higher probability of childlessness. This effect is even stronger for poor women.

=== Social support ===
Social support from the extended family and friends can help a couple decide to have a child, or another one.

Studies mainly in ex-communist Eastern European countries have associated increased fertility with increased social capital in the form of personal relationships, goods, information, money, work capacity, influence, power, and personal help from others.

Research in the U.S. shows that the extended family willing to provide support becomes a "safety net". This is particularly important for single mothers and situations involving partnership instability.

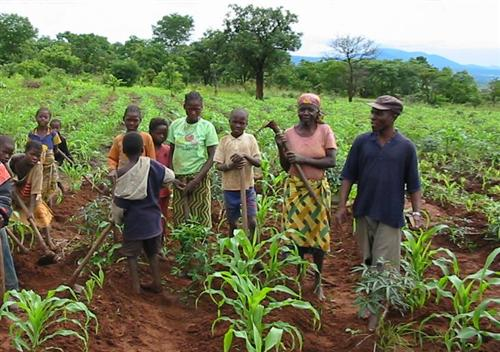
A family of rural Africa

=== Rural residence ===
Total fertility rates are higher among women in rural areas than among women in urban areas, as evidenced from low-income, middle-income and high-income countries. Field researchers have found that fertility rates are high and remain relatively stable among rural populations. Little evidence exists to suggest that high-fertility parents appear to be economically disadvantaged, further strengthening the fact that total fertility rates tend to be higher among women in rural areas. On the other hand, studies have suggested that a higher population density is associated with decreased fertility rates. It is shown through studies that fertility rates differ between regions in ways that reflect the opportunity costs of child rearing. In a region with high population density, women restrain themselves from having many children due to the costs of living, therefore lowering the fertility rates. Within urban areas, people in suburbs are consistently found to have higher fertility. Some research indicates that population density may explain up to 31% of the variance in fertility rates, although the effect of population density on fertility can be moderated by other factors such as environmental conditions, religiosity and social norms.

=== Pro-family government programs ===
Many studies have attempted to determine the causal link between government policies and fertility. However, as this article suggests, there are many factors that can potentially affect decisions to have children, how many to have, and when to have them, and separating these factors from effects of a particular government policy is difficult. Making this even more difficult is the time lag between government policy initiation and results.

The purpose of these programs is to reduce the opportunity cost of having children, either by increasing family income or reducing the cost of children. One study has found a positive effect on number of children during life due to family policy programs that make it easier for women to combine family and employment. Again, the idea here is to reduce the opportunity cost of children. These positive results have been found in Germany, Sweden, Canada, and the US.

However, other empirical studies show that these programs are expensive and their impact tends to be small, so currently there is no broad consensus on their effectiveness in raising fertility.

=== Other factors associated with increased fertility ===
Other factors associated with increase of fertility include:

- Social pressure: Women have an increased probability to have another child when there is social pressure from parents, relatives, and friends to do so. For example, fertility increases during the one to two years after a sibling or a co-worker has a child.
- Homophily: an increased fertility is seen in people with a tendency to seek acquaintance among those with common characteristics.
- Patriarchy: Male-dominated families generally have more children.
- Nuclear family households have higher fertility than cooperative living arrangements, according to studies both from the Western World.
- Illegalization of abortion temporarily increased birth rates in communist Romania for a few years, but this was followed by a later decline due to an increased use of illegal abortion.
- Assisted reproduction technology (ART). One study from Denmark projects an increase in fertility, as a result of ART, that could increase the 1975 birth cohort by 5%. In addition, ART seems to challenge the biological limits of successful childbearing.
- Immigration sometimes increases fertility rates of a country because of the births to the immigrant groups. However, over succeeding generations, migrant fertility often converges to that of their new country. The religiosity factor above, however, provides for various systematic exceptions to that rule.

== Factors associated with decreased fertility ==
Fertility is declining in advanced societies because couples are having fewer children or none at all, or they are delaying childbirth beyond the woman's most fertile years. The factors that lead to this trend are complex and probably vary from country to country.

=== Rising income ===
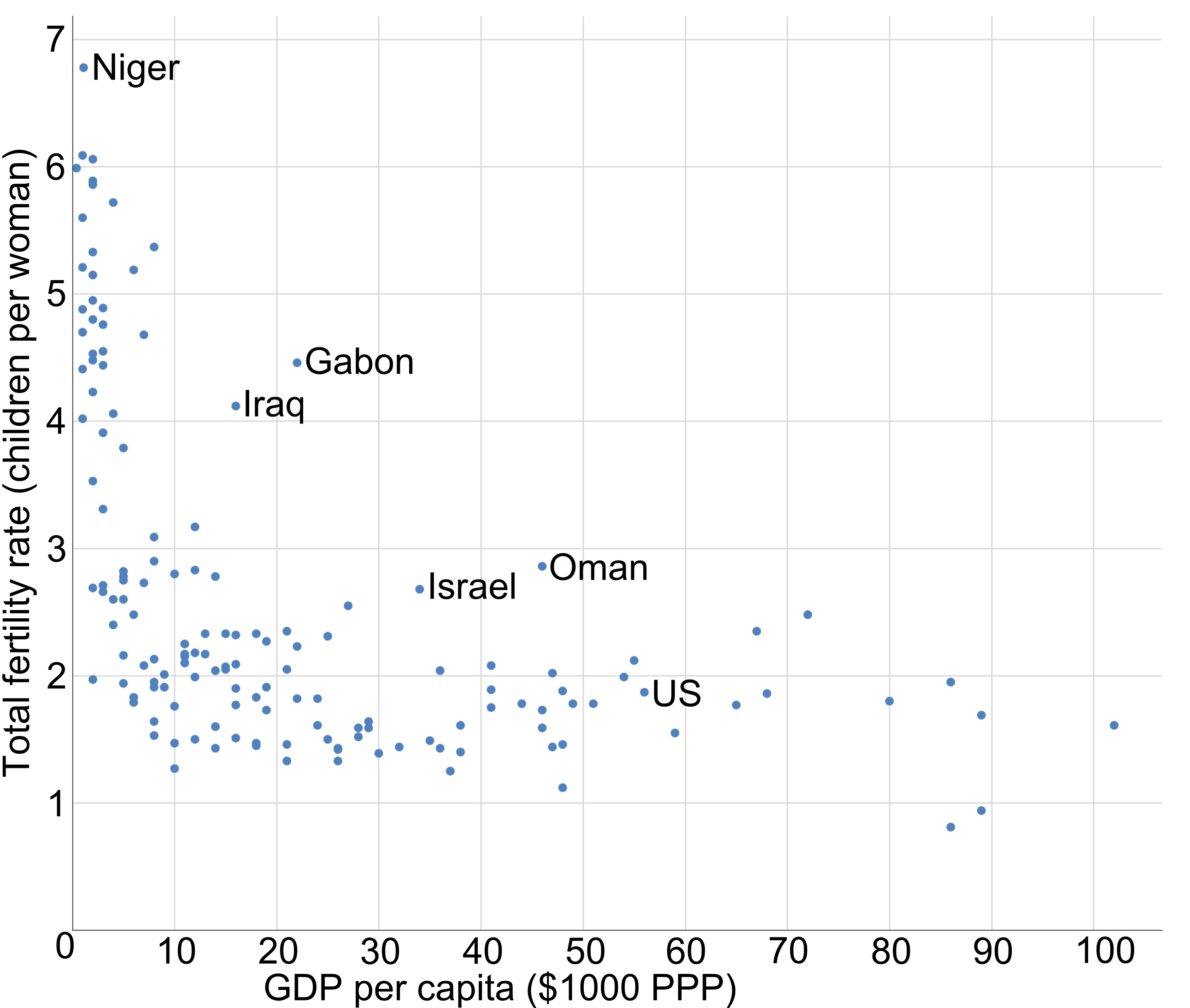
Graph of total fertility rate vs. GDP (PPP) per capita of the corresponding country, 2015

Increased income and human development are generally associated with decreased fertility rates. Economic theories about declining fertility postulate that people earning more have a higher opportunity cost if they focus on childbirth and parenting rather than continuing their careers, that women who can economically sustain themselves have less incentive to become married, and that higher income parents value quality over quantity and so spend their resources on fewer children.

On the other hand, there is some evidence that with rising economic development, fertility rates drop at first, but then begin to rise again as the level of social and economic development increases, while still remaining below the replacement rate.

=== Value and attitude changes ===
While some researchers cite economic factors as the main driver of fertility decline, socio-cultural theories focus on changes in values and attitudes toward children as being primarily responsible. For example, the Second Demographic Transition reflects changes in personal goals, religious preferences, relationships, and perhaps most important, family formations. Also, Preference Theory attempts to explain how women's choices regarding work versus family have changed and how the expansion of options and the freedom to choose the option that seems best for them are the keys to recent declines in TFR.

A comparative study in Europe found that family-oriented women had the most children, work-oriented women had fewer or no children, and that among other factors, preferences play a major role in deciding to remain childless.

Another example of this can be found in Europe and in post-Soviet states, where values of increased autonomy and independence have been associated with decreased fertility.

=== Education ===
Results from research which attempts to find causality between education and fertility is mixed. One theory holds that higher educated women are more likely to become career women. Also, for higher educated women, there is a higher opportunity cost to bearing children. Both would lead higher educated women to postpone marriage and births. However, other studies suggest that, although higher educated women may postpone marriage and births, they can recuperate at a later age so that the impact of higher education is negligible.

In the United States, a large survey found that women with a bachelor's degree or higher had an average of 1.1 children, while those with no high school diploma or equivalent had an average of 2.5 children. For men with the same levels of education, the number of children was 1.0 and 1.7, respectively.

In Europe, on the other hand, women who are more educated eventually have about as many children as do the less educated, but that education results in having children at an older age. Likewise, a study in Norway found that better-educated males have a decreased probability of remaining childless, although they generally became fathers at an older age.

Catholic education at the university level and, to a lesser degree, at the secondary school level, was associated with higher fertility, even when accounting for the confounding effect that higher religiosity among Catholics leads to a higher probability of attending a religiously affiliated school.

The level of a country's development often determines the level of women's education required to affect fertility. Countries with lower levels of development and gender equivalence are likely to find that a higher level of women's education, greater than secondary level, is required to affect fertility. Studies suggest that in many sub-Saharan African countries fertility decline is linked to female education. Having said this, fertility in undeveloped countries can still be significantly reduced in the absence of any improvement in the general level of formal education. For example, During the period 1997-2002 (15 years), fertility in Bangladesh fell by almost 40%, despite the fact that literacy rates (especially those of women) did not increase significantly. This reduction has been attributed to that country's family planning program, which could be called a form of informal education.

=== Population control ===
During the second part of the 20th century, several countries, especially in Asia, have implemented official or unofficial population policies meant to decrease family size, such as one-child policy or two child policy. China and India have the oldest and the largest human population control programs in the world. In China, a one-child policy was introduced between 1978 and 1980, and began to be formally phased out in 2015 in favor of a two-child policy. The total fertility rate in China fell from 2.8 births per woman in 1979 to 1.5 in 2010. However, the efficacy of the one-child policy itself is not clear, since there was already a sharp reduction from more than five births per woman in the early 1970s, before the introduction of the one-child policy. It has thereby been suggested that a decline in fertility rate would have continued even without the strict antinatalist policy. In 2015 China ended its one child policy, allowing couples to have two children. This was a result of China having a large dependency ratio with its ageing population and working force. In May 2021, the general secretaryship of Xi Jinping formally introduced the three-child policy to replace the two-child policy.

Vietnam has had a population policy for over 60 years. It was launched by the Vietnamese government in the early 1960s in North Vietnam and continued in a modified form throughout all of Vietnam (not just the north), until 2025, when due to a sub-replacement fertility rate, the communist government lifted all regulations regarding the number of children families are allowed to have. The two-child policy, in force until 2025, emphasized the official family-size goal to be một hoặc hai con, which means "one or two children."

In the 1970s, in British Hong Kong, families were urged to have maximum two children, although this was not mandated by law, and was instead part of the family planning campaign "Two is Enough".

In South Korea, following the surge in births after the Korean War, the government, starting in 1961, developed population policies meant to suppress population growth, which continued to be implemented in the 1970s and 1980s. In 1983, for the first time, the TFR dropped to 2.06, below the replacement rate of 2.1.

In the 1990s, in Iran, the government stated that Islam favoured families with two children, as part of its population policy.

Extensive efforts have been put into family planning in India. The fertility rate has dropped from 5.7 in 1966 to 2.4 in 2016. Still, by 2010, India's family planning program was regarded as only partially successful in controlling fertility rates. By 2023, India's TFR declined to 1.9, although the TFR varies by state.

=== Female labor force participation ===
Increased participation of women in the workforce is associated with decreased fertility. A multi-country panel study found this effect to be strongest among women aged 20–39, with a less strong but persistent effect among older women as well. International United Nations data suggests that women who work because of economic necessity have higher fertility than those who work because they want to do so.

However, for countries in the OECD area, increased female labor participation has been associated with increased fertility.

Causality analyses indicate that fertility rate influences female labor participation, not the other way around.

Women who work in nurturing professions such as teaching and health generally have children at an earlier age. It is theorized that women often self-select themselves into jobs with a favorable work–life balance in order to pursue both motherhood and employment.

=== Pensions ===
Some pension systems can decrease the incentive to have children, in effect insuring individuals against voluntary childlessness. In countries without pensions children can form an old-age-security.

=== Age ===
Cumulative percentage and average age for women reaching subfertility, sterility, irregular menstruation and menopause

Regarding age and female fertility, fertility starts at onset of menses, typically around age 12-13 Most women become subfertile during the early 30s, and during the early 40s most women become sterile.

Regarding age and male fertility, men have decreased pregnancy rates, increased time to pregnancy, and increased infertility as they age, although the correlation is not as substantial as in women. When controlling for the age of the female partner, comparisons between men under 30 and men over 50 found relative decreases in pregnancy rates between 23% and 38%.

An Indian study found that couples where the woman is less than one year younger than the man have a total mean number of children of 3.1, compared to 3.5 when the woman is 7–9 years younger than the man.

=== Contraception ===
The "contraceptive revolution" has played a crucial role in reducing the number of children (quantum) and postponing child-bearing (tempo).

Periods of decreased use of contraceptive pills due to fears of side effects have been linked with increased fertility in the United Kingdom. Introductions of laws that increase access to contraceptives have been associated with decreased fertility in the United States. However, short-term decreases in fertility may reflect a tempo effect of later childbearing, with individuals using contraceptives catching up later in life. A review of long-term fertility in Europe did not find fertility rates to be directly affected by availability of contraceptives.

=== Partner and partnership ===
The decision to bear a child in advanced societies generally requires agreement between both partners. Disagreement between partners may mean that the desire for children of one partner are not realized.

The last several decades have also seen changes in partnership dynamics. This has led to a tendency toward later marriages and a rise in unmarried cohabitation. Both of these have been linked to the postponement of parenthood (tempo) and thus reduced fertility.

=== Infertility ===
20-30% percent of infertility cases are due to male infertility, 20–35% are due to female infertility, and 25-40% are due to combined problems. In 10–20% of cases, no cause is found.

The most common cause of female infertility is ovulatory problems, which generally manifest themselves by sparse or absent menstrual periods. Male infertility is most commonly caused by deficiencies in the semen: semen quality is used as a surrogate measure of male fecundity.

=== Other factors associated with decreased fertility ===
- Intense relationships. A Dutch study found that couples are likely to have fewer children if they have high levels of either negative or positive interaction.
- Unstable relationships, according to a review in Europe.
- Higher tax rates.
- Unemployment. A study in the USA shows that unemployment in women has effects both in the short and the long term in reducing their fertility rate.
- Hot weather is suggested as a factor in some research.

== More complex factors ==
=== Delayed childbearing and tempo effect ===
The trend of couples forming partnerships and marrying at later ages has been going on for some time. For example, in the US, during the period 1970 to 2006, the average age of first-time mothers increased by 3.6 years, from 21.4 years to 25.0 years.

Also, fertility postponement has become common in all European countries, including those of the former Soviet Union.

Nevertheless, delayed childbirth alone is not sufficient to reduce fertility rates: in France despite the average high age at first birth, fertility rate remains close to the 2.1 replacement value. The aggregate effects of delayed childbearing tend to be relatively minor, because most women still have their first child well before the onset of infertility.

=== Additional variables ===
The following have been reported, at least in the primary research literature, to have no or uncertain effects.

- Government support of assisted reproductive technology (ART) like IVF, whereas policies that transfer cash to families for pregnancy, and child support have only a limited effect on total fertility rate, according to the same review.
- Relationship quality and stability have complex relations to fertility, wherein couples with a medium-quality relationship appear to be the most likely to have another child.
- Governmental maternity leave benefits have no significant effect on fertility, according to one primary source.
- Children from previous unions. A study in the United Kingdom found that partners with children from previous unions have a higher likelihood of having children together. A study in France found the opposite, that childbearing rates are lowest after re-partnering if both partners are already parents. The French study also found that in couples where only one was already a parent, fertility rates were about the same as in childless couples.
- Spousal height difference. Could be explained by all manner of visible sexual dimorphisms priming for other instinctual functions associated with reproduction.
- Mother's health is also a great determinant of the state of health of the unborn child, mother's death in childbirth means almost certain death for her newly born child.
- Birth spacing refers to the timing and frequency of pregnancies. Childbirth to a mother is affected by this factor in one way or the other.
- Familism. The fertility impact is unknown in country-level familism systems, where the majority of the economic and caring responsibilities rest on the family (such as in Southern Europe), as opposed to defamilialized systems, where welfare and caring responsibilities are largely supported by the state (such as Nordic countries).

== Racial and ethnic factors ==
In the United States, Hispanics, and African Americans have earlier and higher fertility than other racial and ethnic groups. In 2009, the teen birth rate for Hispanics between the age 15-19 was roughly 80 births per 1000 women. The teen birth rate for African Americans in 2009 was 60 births per 1000 women and 20 for non Hispanic teens (white). According to the United States census, State Health Serve and the CDC, Hispanics accounted for 23% of the birth in 2014 out of the 1,000,000 births in the United States.

== Multifactorial analyses ==
A regression analysis on a population in India resulted in the following equation of total fertility rate, where parameters preceded by a plus were associated with increased fertility, and parameters preceded by a minus were associated with decreased fertility:

Total Fertility Rate = 0.02 (human development index*) + 0.07 (infant mortality rate*) − 0.34 (contraceptive use) + 0.03 (male age at marriage*) − 0.21 (female age at marriage) − 0.16 (birth interval) − 0.26 (use of improved water quality) + 0.03 (male literacy rate*) − 0.01 (female literacy rate*) − 0.30 (maternal care)

* = Parameter did not reach statistical significance on its own

== See also ==
- Family § Size
- List of people with the most children
- Natalism and antinatalism, promoting and opposing human reproduction
- Sub-replacement fertility
- Social aspects of television

== Sources ==
- Balbo N, Billari FC, Mills M (February 2013). "Fertility in Advanced Societies: A Review of Research: La fécondité dans les sociétés avancées: un examen des recherches". European Journal of Population. 29 (1): 1–38. doi:10.1007/s10680-012-9277-y. PMC 3576563. PMID 23440941.
