= E. S. Gosney =

American financier, eugenicist

E.S. Gosney
- Born: November 6, 1855; Kenton County, Kentucky, United States
- Died: September 14, 1942 (aged 86)
- Education: Saint Louis University School of Law
- Occupations: Philanthropist; eugenicist
- Known for: Advocating eugenics and compulsory sterilization

Ezra Seymour Gosney (November 6, 1855 – September 14, 1942) was an American businessman and philanthropist who supported the practice of eugenics. In 1928 he founded the Human Betterment Foundation (HBF) in Pasadena, California, with the stated aim "to foster and aid constructive and educational forces for the protection and betterment of the human family in body, mind, character, and citizenship," primarily through the advocacy of compulsory sterilization of people who are mentally ill or intellectually disabled. Rufus B. von KleinSmid, President of University of Southern California, was a co-founder.

== Biography ==
Gosney was born in Kenton County, Kentucky, in 1855. He earned a degree in law from the Saint Louis University School of Law in 1880. He settled in Flagstaff, Arizona, where he was involved in the establishment of a Wool Grower's Association. There he married and had two daughters with his wife.

Around 1905 he relocated with his family to Southern California, eager to escape the "wild west" environment still present in Arizona while raising two daughters. There he became an active participant in the business community in Pasadena, California, especially in the cultivation of citrus and other crops.

Around this time he expanded his philanthropy. He helped establish the first California council of the Boy Scouts of America. He also donated $12,500 to found Polytechnic School in 1907.

By the 1920s he had built up a considerable fortune, owned one of the largest lemon groves in the state, and served as the director of numerous banks, trusts companies, and corporations.

While working in Pasadena, he became acquainted with biologist and eugenicist Paul B. Popenoe. In 1925 Gosney financed Popenoe's collection of data on the implementation of California's eugenic compulsory sterilization laws. At the time, compulsory sterilization was seen by many as a way to reduce the incidence of mental illness and intellectual disability in the population over time. Many states had legislation requiring the sterilization of patients at state-run psychiatric facilities, though only California executed the laws in earnest. Most other state officials were wary about the legal status of compulsory sterilization.

The result of Gosney and Popenoe's research was a co-authored volume, Sterilization for Human Betterment: A Summary of Results of 6,000 Operations in California, 1909–1929, completed and published in 1929. The book argued that eugenic sterilization was scientifically supported, caused no harm to patients, and was legally sound. The book, distributed widely by Gosney, was used to promote compulsory sterilization legislation in other states and countries. Along with work by Harry H. Laughlin, it was one of the most influential texts on sterilization in the United States.

In 1933 officials in Nazi Germany specifically referred to Gosney and Popenoe's book in the creation of their own sterilization legislation that year. They noted that the United States authors had provided proof that sterilization programs could be safe and effective. According to a U.S. health official at the time, who had just returned from a trip to Germany, "the leaders in the German sterilization movement state repeatedly that their legislation was formulated only after careful study of the California experiment." (quoted in Kühl 1994, pp. 42–43) Gosney and Popenoe believed the population of mentally ill in the United States could be reduced by half in "three or four generations." The Sacramento philanthropist/eugenicist Charles Goethe wrote to Gosney in a 1934 letter:

You will be interested to know that your work has played a powerful part in shaping the opinions of the group of intellectuals who are behind Hitler in this epoch-making program. Everywhere I sensed that their opinions have been tremendously stimulated by American thought and particularly by the work of the Human Betterment Foundation. I want you, my dear friend, to carry this thought with you for the rest of your life, that you have really jolted into action a great government of 60 million people. (quoted in Black 2003)

A follow-up study, Twenty-eight Years of Sterilization in California, was published by the pair in 1938. (The American Journal of Sociology reviewed it with a single sentence: "An awkward attempt to popularize the practice of sterilizing defectives"). The state of California would eventually sterilize over 20,000 patients in state-run hospitals under its eugenic laws; Nazi Germany would sterilize over 400,000.

In 1926, Gosney had first begun to organize what would by 1928 become chartered as the Human Betterment Foundation: a philanthropic foundation to promote research and advocacy of eugenics, especially by means of sterilization. As Gosney put it, the Foundation would work for:

the advancement and betterment of human life, character, and citizenship, particularly in the United States of America, in such manner as shall make for human progress in life. It is not the primary intention of to engage in the care of the unfortunate or in any form of relief work, but rather to foster and aid constructive and educational efforts for the protection and betterment of human family in body, mind, character, and citizenship in life. (Gosney and Popenoe 1929, p. 192)

The initial board of trustees was Gosney, Henry M. Robinson (a Los Angeles banker); George Dock (a Pasadena physician); Justin Miller (dean of the college of law at the University of Southern California); Otis Castle (a Los Angeles attorney); Joe G. Crick (a Pasadena horticulturist); Goethe, and Popenoe. Later members included Lewis Terman (a Stanford psychologist best known for creating the Stanford-Binet test of IQ); William B. Munro (a Harvard professor of political science); and University of California, Berkeley professors Herbert M. Evans (anatomy) and Samuel J. Holmes (zoology).

The Foundation also established links with the California Institute of Technology. Caltech physicist Robert Millikan (who later won a Nobel Prize) joined the board of the HBF in 1937. The Foundation published a number of pamphlets and financed continued studies of the California sterilization program through the 1930s. It sent thousands of letters to teachers, libraries, and physicians advocating eugenic sterilization. It also underwrote a column in the Los Angeles Times on "social eugenics", and financed a radio program and hundreds of popular lectures around the country to educate people about the subject. Along with the American Eugenics Society, it was the most active and influential eugenics advocacy group in the country.

Upon Gosney's death in 1942, his daughter liquidated the Foundation and donated its remaining assets to Caltech. In 1943, it established a Gosney research fund for biological research using the money as an endowment. The archives of the Human Betterment Foundation are in Special Collections at Caltech in Pasadena.

Since the late 20th century, public attitudes have changed and largely reject Gosney's work and eugenics in general. In January 2021 the Caltech Board of Trustees authorized removal of Gosney's name (and the names of five other historical figures affiliated with the Human Betterment Foundation), from Caltech campus buildings and other memorials.

== See also ==
- Eugenics in the United States
