= American Eugenics Society =

Pro-eugenics organization (1922-2019)

The Society for Biodemography and Social Biology
- Formation: 1922
- Dissolved: 2019
- Location: United States
- Formerly called: The Society for the Study of Social Biology; The American Eugenics Society

The American Eugenics Society (AES) was a pro-eugenics organization dedicated to "furthering the discussion, advancement, and dissemination of knowledge about biological and sociocultural forces which affect the structure and composition of human populations". It endorsed the study and practice of eugenics in the United States. Its original name as the American Eugenics Society lasted from 1922 to 1973, but the group changed their name after open use of the term "eugenics" became disfavored; it was known as the Society for the Study of Social Biology from 1973 to 2008, and the Society for Biodemography and Social Biology from 2008–2019. The Society was disbanded in 2019.

== History ==
Initially known as the American Eugenics Society, or AES, the Society formed after the success of the Second International Congress on Eugenics (New York, 1921). AES founders included Madison Grant, Harry H. Laughlin, Irving Fisher, Henry Fairfield Osborn, Charles Davenport and Henry Crampton. The organization started by promoting racial betterment, eugenic health, and genetic education through public lectures, exhibits at county fairs, etc.

To gain popularity with the public, the eugenics movement adopted "two faces", a positive and negative face. The 'positive' side of this movement focused on emphasizing the urge for the "genetically gifted" to reproduce. The 'negative' face of the eugenics campaign involved efforts to prevent the "defective" individuals from reproducing. This negative side of the eugenics movement catalyzed anti-immigration movements of the early twentieth centuries because of the idea that non-whites and immigrants were "inferior" to "native-born white Americans" in terms of intelligence, physical condition, and moral stature.

The AES primarily used fitter family contests to help promote its mission. These fitter family contests took place in public festivals or fairs. Physical appearance, behavior, intelligence, and health were just a few of the qualities that the AES looked at while determining the fittest family. The AES would give out prizes, trophies, and medals to the winning families. Additionally, the AES would sponsor displays and exhibits that featured statistics on the births of "undesirable" or "desirable" children at the fairs and festivals. An example of such a display from the 1920s and 1930s statistics claimed as follows: Every sixteen seconds, a child is born in the United States. Out of those children, a capable, desirable child is born every seven and a half minutes, whereas an undesirable, feebleminded child is born every forty-eight seconds, and a future criminal is born every fifty seconds. To conclude, the display would argue that every fifteen seconds, a hundred dollars of taxpayers' money went towards supporting the mentally ill and undesirable.

These family contests also involved judgements. These "judgements" were taken from each participants' medical records, occupation, education level, political affiliation, marital status, and religion. IQ tests were also taken to establish each participant's intelligence level. Then, each family underwent "physical examinations" and "disease testing". Following all of these tests and examinations, each participant would receive a "score" and a "family level score". The participants who scored highly received a medal that read 'Yea, I have a goodly heritage.' The demographic of these medal winners were predominantly white, married, wealthy, educated, and non-immigrant individuals which promoted the AES agenda of ideal and perfect traits for "positive eugenics".

There were numerous committees within the AES dedicated to different aspects of eugenic education. For example, there was a committee dedicated to crime prevention. These committees pressured local municipal and legal systems to push the AES beliefs and ideas.

The AES also sought to promote eugenic policies at the US state and federal level; in particular, Harry H. Laughlin promoted eugenic sterilization in the early twentieth century. By the late 1920s, eugenic sterilization laws were being enforced in multiple states (Sterilization law in the United States). By 1933, California had enforced eugenically sterilization laws on more people than any of the other US states combined, mainly affecting people of color and foreign immigrants. These laws led to court cases and lawsuits, such as Buck v. Bell (1927) and Skinner v. Oklahoma (1942).

In 1926, the society published a Eugenics Catechism, arguing that eugenics was supported by the Bible, and therefore ought to be promoted by Christians.

During the presidency of Henry Farnham Perkins from 1931 to 1933, the AES worked with the American Birth Control League. Margaret Sanger, a birth control activist, was a member of the AES in 1956 and established the American Birth Control League in 1921. Margaret Sanger, however, identified with broader issues of "health and fitness" during the 20th century eugenics movement, which were well-respected and popular amongst doctors, physicians, political leaders, and educators. Sanger continued to believe in and push for women's reproductive rights and encouraged those in political power to steer away from racially motivated ideas or tactics involving the eugenics movement. For example, Sanger "vocally opposed" racial stereotyping which lead to the passing of the Immigration Act of 1924, "on the grounds that intelligence" and other characteristics vary by individual, not by group. However, as much as Margaret Sanger has had positive points, we cannot forget her negative ones as well. Like the “Negro Project” she introduced, with the intention of eradicating “inferior races” and “human weeds” from the population.

Under the direction of Frederick Osborn, the Society began to place greater focus on issues of population control, genetics, and, later, medical genetics. In 1930, the Society included mostly prominent and wealthy individuals, and membership included many non-scientists. The demographics of the Society gradually changed, and by 1960, members of the Society were almost exclusively scientists and medical professionals. Consequentially, the Society focused more on genetics and less on class-based eugenics.

After the Roe v. Wade decision was released in 1973, the Society was reorganized and renamed The Society for the Study of Social Biology. Osborn said, "[t]he name was changed because it became evident that changes of a eugenic nature would be made for reasons other than eugenics, and that tying a eugenic label on them would more often hinder than help."

The name was most recently changed to Society for Biodemography and Social Biology in 2008. The name inherited the name of two disciplines (biodemography and social biology) as a result of interactions between demography and biology throughout the last half of the twentieth century. The Society was then disbanded in 2019. The disbandment of the Society was ultimately due to limits on funding, member engagement, internal tensions, and public interest, or lack thereof, in eugenics. The Society initially began to struggle finding sufficient funding. The lack of funding issue began around 1937 but continued until its official disbandment. The moving of the AES head offices from New Haven to New York in the 1930s also incurred some financial difficulties. The issue of lack of funding was never fully resolved but was not substantial enough to end the AES. As time persisted, the eugenics belief and the Society's history became increasingly unpopular amongst individuals and the Society received lots of backlash, ultimately causing its disbandment.

== Journal ==
The Society's official journal was Biodemography and Social Biology, originally established in 1954 as Eugenics Quarterly. It was renamed to Social Biology in 1969 and to Biodemography and Social Biology in 2008. The Journal has continued to publish original research articles and short reports from Taylor and Francis.

== List of presidents ==
=== American Eugenics Society (1922–1973) ===
- Irving Fisher 1922–1926 (Political Economy, Yale University)
- Roswell Hill Johnson 1926–1927 (Cold Spring Harbor, Univ. of Pittsburgh)
- Harry H. Laughlin 1927–1929 (Eugenics Record Office)
- Clarence C. Little 1929 (Pres., University of Michigan)
- Henry Pratt Fairchild 1929–1931 (Sociology, New York University)
- Henry Farnham Perkins 1931–1934 (Zoology, University of Vermont)
- Ellsworth Huntington 1934–1938 (Geography, Yale University)
- Samuel Jackson Holmes 1938–1940 (Zoology, University of California)
- Maurice Bigelow 1940–1945 (Columbia University)
- Frederick Osborn 1946–1952 (Osborn-Dodge-Harriman RR connection)
- Harry L. Shapiro 1956–1963 (American Museum of Natural History)
- Clyde V. Kiser 1964–1968 (differential fertility, Milbank Memorial Fund)
- Dudley Kirk 1969–1972 (Demography, Stanford University)
- Bruce K. Eckland 1972–1975 (Sociology, University of North Carolina)

=== The Society for the Study of Social Biology (1973–2008) ===
- Bruce K. Eckland 1972–1975 (Sociology, University of North Carolina)
- L. Erlenmeyer-Kimling 1976–1978 (Genetic Psychiatry)
- Gardner Lindzey 1979–1981 (Center for Advanced Study, Behavioral Sciences)
- John L. Fuller 1982–1983 (Behavioral genetics)
- Michael Teitelbaum 1985–1990 (US Congress staff; US population policy)
- Robert Retherford 1991–1994 (East-West Institute, Hawaii; funded by AID)
- Joseph Lee Rodgers 1994–1995 (Psychology, University of Oklahoma)

=== Society for Biodemography and Social Biology (2008–2019) ===
- Hans-Peter Kohler, 2007–2012 (Demography, University of Pennsylvania)
- Jason Boardman, 2012–2015 (University of Colorado Boulder)
- Andrew J. Noymer, 2015–2019 (University of California, Irvine)

== See also ==
- American Society of Human Genetics
- Behavior Genetics Association
- British Eugenics Society
- Human Betterment Foundation
