= Parapinnixa =

Scientific classification
- Kingdom: Animalia
- Phylum: Arthropoda
- Class: Malacostraca
- Order: Decapoda
- Suborder: Pleocyemata
- Infraorder: Brachyura
- Family: Parapinnixidae
- Genus: Parapinnixa; Holmes, 1895

Synonyms
- Pseudopinnixa Holmes, 1894

Genus of crabs

Parapinnixa is a genus of crabs in the family Parapinnixidae. Originally described by Samuel Jackson Holmes as Pseudopinnixa, he published the replacement name Parapinnixa the following year, after learning of the senior homonym Pseudopinnixa Ortmann, 1894.

The genus contains the following species:

- Parapinnixa affinis Holmes, 1900 – California Bay pea crab
- Parapinnixa beaufortensis Rathbun, 1918
- Parapinnixa bouvieri Rathbun, 1918
- Parapinnixa cortesi Thoma, Heard & Vargas, 2005
- Parapinnixa cubana Campos, 1994
- Parapinnixa glasselli Garth, 1939
- Parapinnixa hendersoni Rathbun, 1918
- Parapinnixa magdalenensis Werding & Müller, 1990
- Parapinnixa nitida (Lockington, 1876)
