= Total fertility rate =

Average lifetime number of children per woman

Children per woman

The total fertility rate (TFR) of a population is the average number of children that are born to a biological female over their lifetime, if they were to experience the exact current age-specific fertility rates (ASFRs) through their lifetime, and they were to live from birth until the end of their reproductive life.

In 2026 the total fertility rate varied widely across the world, from 0.7 children per female in South Korea to 5.8 in Chad. Among sovereign countries that were not city states or microstates, in 2025 the following countries had a TFR of 1.0 or lower: China, South Korea, Taiwan, Thailand, and Ukraine; the following countries had a TFR of 1.2 or lower: Argentina, Belarus, Chile, Colombia, Costa Rica, Estonia, Italy, Greece, Japan, Lithuania, Malta, Poland, Spain, and Uruguay.

Several socioeconomic factors affect fertility, and presently approximately two thirds of the world's population lives in countries which have below replacement fertility rates. Currently, the vast majority of countries which have above replacement fertility rates are situated in Africa, while the fertility rate is very low in much of East Asia. Historically, developed countries have significantly lower fertility rates, generally correlated with greater wealth, education, urbanization, and other factors. Conversely, in least developed countries, fertility rates tend to be higher. Families desire children for their labor and as caregivers for their parents in old age. Fertility rates are also higher due to the lack of access to contraceptives, generally lower levels of female education, and lower rates of female employment. Since the 1960s, global decreases in total fertility rates may also reflect effects of pollution on reproduction.

From antiquity to the beginning of the industrial revolution, around the year 1800, total fertility rates of 4.5 to 7.5 were common around the world. After this TFR declined only slightly and up until the 1960s the global average TFR was still 5. Since then, global average TFR has dropped steadily to less than half that number, 2.3 births per woman in 2023. Sub-Saharan Africa is the fastest growing world region, with 30% of all global births being in that region in 2021. Among individual world countries, in 2024, births in India amounted for the highest global share, with 17.4% of all global births, followed by China, with 6% (see List of countries by number of births).

The United Nations predicts that global fertility will continue to decline for the remainder of this century and reach a below-replacement level of 1.8 by 2100, and that world population will peak in 2084.

== How TFR is calculated ==
The TFR typically refers to the total period fertility rate. The TFR for (say) year 2024 is usually calculated by this formula:

$TFR_{2024} = 5 \times \left( \frac{\text{Number of births in 2024 by women aged 15 to 19}}{\text{Number of women in 2024 aged 15 to 19}} + \dots + \frac{\text{Number of births by women in 2024 aged 45 to 49}}{\text{Number of women in 2024 aged 45 to 49}}\right)$.

Ideally and more correctly, it should instead be computed by this formula:

$TFR_{2024} = \frac{\text{Number of births in 2024 by women aged 15}}{\text{Number of women in 2024 aged 15}} + \dots + \frac{\text{Number of births by women in 2024 aged 49}}{\text{Number of women in 2024 aged 49}}$.

But this second formula requires fertility rates for each single-year age group (which may not be available or may be poorly estimated). And so, government and international agencies usually prefer the first formula (which requires only fertility rates for each five-year age group).

The total period fertility rate is affected by the tempo effect caused by changes in average age of childbearing. If age of childbearing increases, and life cycle fertility is unchanged, then TPFR will be lower, because the births are occurring later. Tempo effect can be a significant factor in some countries, such as the Czech Republic and Spain in the 1990s.

== Related metrics ==
=== Net reproduction rate ===
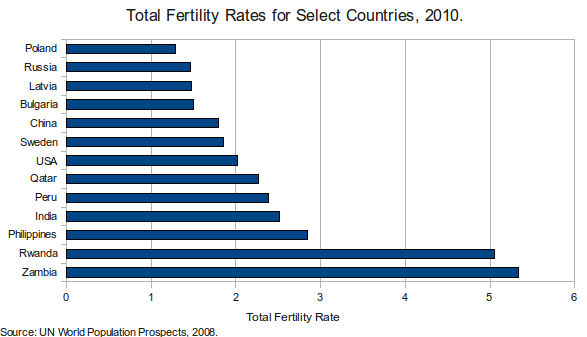
The total fertility rate for selected countries, 2010

An alternative measure of fertility is the net reproduction rate (NRR), which calculates the number of daughters a female would have in her lifetime if she were subject to prevailing age-specific fertility and mortality rates in a given year. When the NRR is exactly 1, each generation of females is precisely replacing itself. This is a significant consideration in world population dynamics in countries with a high level of gender imbalance and sex selection.

=== Total cohort fertility rate ===
The total cohort fertility rate (TCFR) is the total number of children born to a women on average for an age cohort. The completed cohort fertility rate is a lagging indicator because it is measured at the end of the reproductive stage with the begin of menopause, typically around 45 years. Changes in cohort fertility can be decomposed into changes in childlessness rate and change in number of children per parent.

=== Replacement rates ===
Replacement fertility rate by country

Replacement fertility is the total fertility rate at which women give birth to enough babies to sustain population levels, assuming that mortality rates remain constant and net migration is zero. If replacement level fertility is sustained over a sufficiently long period, each generation will exactly replace itself. In 2003, the replacement fertility rate was 2.1 births per female for most developed countries (2.1 in the UK, for example), but could be as high as 3.5 in undeveloped countries because of higher mortality rates, especially child mortality. The global average for the replacement total fertility rate, eventually leading to a stable global population, for 2010–2015, was 2.3 children per female.

== Lowest-low fertility ==
List of sovereign states with lowest-low fertility as of 2025 (Note: Source: Individual country demographic pages linked via TFR values.)
Country or region	TFR	Number of births
Taiwan	0.70	107,812
South Korea	0.80	254,457
Andorra	0.83	508
Singapore	0.87	30,004
Thailand	0.87	416,574
San Marino	0.91	166
China	0.93	7,920,000
Malta	0.98	4,338
Colombia	1.01	433,678
Belarus	1.03	54,257
Lithuania	1.03	17,478
Argentina	1.04	384,042
Poland	1.07	238,264
Ukraine	1.10	168,778
Spain	1.11	321,164
Costa Rica	1.12	45,384
Chile	1.14	146,172
Italy	1.14	355,435
Japan	1.14	671,236
Uruguay	1.15	28,903
Estonia	1.16	9,240
Latvia	1.16	11,637
Jamaica	1.22	28,900
Greece	1.23	66,532
Luxembourg	1.23	6,439
Canada	1.25	371,373
Bosnia and Herzegovina	1.26	25,935
Cuba	1.28	68,051
Czech Republic	1.28	77,636
Switzerland	1.28	77,902
Austria	1.30	75,718
Finland	1.30	45,835

The term lowest-low fertility is defined as a TFR at or below 1.3. The term emerged in demographic research during the late 1990s and demographers Hans-Peter Kohler, Francesco C. Billari, and José Antonio Ortega popularized it in 2002, defining it as fertility below 1.3 children per woman.

Lowest-low fertility was first noted within East Asian and European countries but recently spread to the Americas; the lowest rates are still found in East Asia. The East Asian American community in the United States also exhibits lowest-low fertility. At one point in the late 20th century and early 21st century this was concentrated in post-socialist Eastern Europe and parts of Southern Europe, affecting about 344 million people. However, the fertility rate then began to rise in most countries of Europe. Since the 2020s, however, TFR are falling again: in 2023, Spain's TFR fell to 1.19, and Italy's TFR fell to 1.2 children per woman. In Canada, the TFR in 2023 fell to its lowest ever recorded level, at 1.26 children per woman, with Statistics Canada reporting that Canada "has now joined the group of 'lowest-low' fertility countries".

Timeline of First Recorded Year of Lowest Low Fertility by Sovereign States (Note: Source: Individual country demographic pages linked via country names.) (TFR≦1.3)
1916	France
1917–1991
1992	Germany
1993	Italy, Spain
1994
1995	Bulgaria, Latvia, Czech Republic, Greece, Slovenia
1996	Russia
1997	Ukraine, Belarus
1998	Estonia
1999	Hungary
2000	Slovakia
2001	Romania, Lithuania, Armenia
2002	South Korea, Poland, Bosnia and Herzegovina
2003	Taiwan, Japan, Singapore
2004
2005	Moldova
2006–2011
2012	Portugal
2013	Andorra
2014–2016
2017	Malta
2018
2019	Thailand
2020	China, Chile
2021
2022	Uruguay, Costa Rica, Mauritius
2023	Finland, Canada, Colombia, Luxembourg
2024	Argentina, Switzerland

In 2026, Stuart Gietel-Basten, a professor at the Hong Kong University of Science and Technology, and Ignacio Pardo, a professor at the University of the Republic in Uruguay, argue in Population and Development Review that the concept of lowest-low fertility needs to be reconsidered. They argue that, after the 2000s, countries with very low fertility began following increasingly divergent demographic trajectories, shaped not only by fertility but also by international migration, mortality, human capital, age structure, and other socioeconomic factors.

=== The lowest total fertility rate ===
The lowest TFR recorded anywhere in the world in recorded history, is for the Xiangyang district of Jiamusi city (Heilongjiang, China) which had a TFR of 0.41 in 2000.

In 2023, South Korea's TFR was 0.72, the world's lowest for that year, before rebounding to 0.8 by 2025. In 2025, Taiwan overtook South Korea to record the lowest TFR for a country, at just 0.695 recorded.

Outside Asia, the lowest TFR ever recorded was 0.80 for Eastern Germany in 1994. The low Eastern German value was influenced by a change to higher maternal age at birth, with the consequence that neither older cohorts (e.g. women born until the late 1960s), who often already had children, nor younger cohorts, who were postponing childbirth, had many children during that time. The total cohort fertility rate of each age cohort of women in East Germany did not drop as significantly.

== Population-lag effect ==
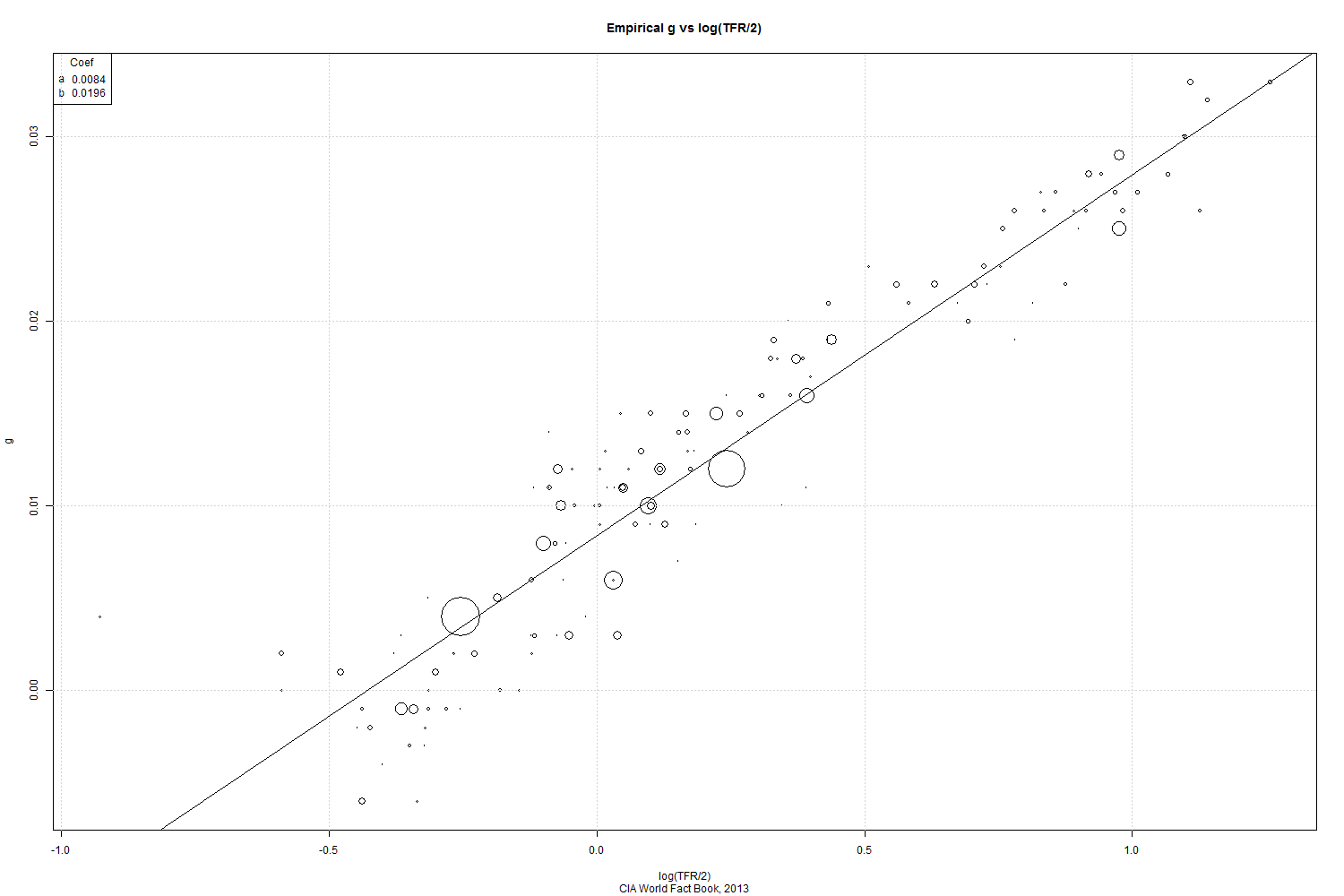
A plot of population growth rate vs total fertility rate (logarithmic), 2014. Symbol radius reflects the population size each country.

A population that maintained a TFR of 3.8 over an extended period, without a correspondingly high death or emigration rate, would increase rapidly, doubling period ≈32 years. A population that maintained a TFR of 2.0 over a long time would decrease, unless it had a large enough immigration.

It may take several generations for a change in the total fertility rate to be reflected in birth rate, because the age distribution must reach equilibrium. For example, a population that has recently dropped below replacement-level fertility will continue to grow, because the recent high fertility produced large numbers of young couples, who would now be in their childbearing years.

This phenomenon carries forward for several generations and is called population momentum, population inertia, or population-lag effect. This time-lag effect is of great importance to the growth rates of human populations.

TFR (net) and long-term population growth rate, g, are closely related. For a population structure in a steady state and with zero migration, $g=\tfrac{\log(\text{TFR}/2)}{\text{X}_{m}}$, where $\text{X}_m$ is mean age for childbearing women and thus $P(t) = P(0)^{(gt)}$. At the left side is shown the empirical relation between the two variables in a cross-section of countries with the most recent y-y growth rate.

The parameter $\tfrac{1}{b}$ should be an estimate of the $\text{X}_m$; here equal to $\tfrac{1}{0.02}=50$ years, way off the mark because of population momentum. E.g. for ${\log}(\tfrac{\text{TFR}}{2}) = 0$, g should be exactly zero, which is seen not to be the case.

== Influencing factors ==
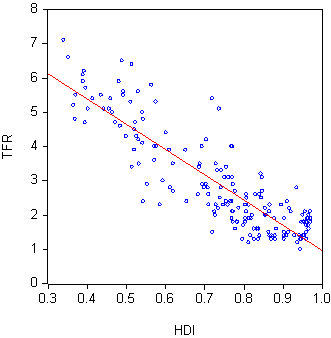
Total fertility rate vs Human Development Index for selected countries, 2011

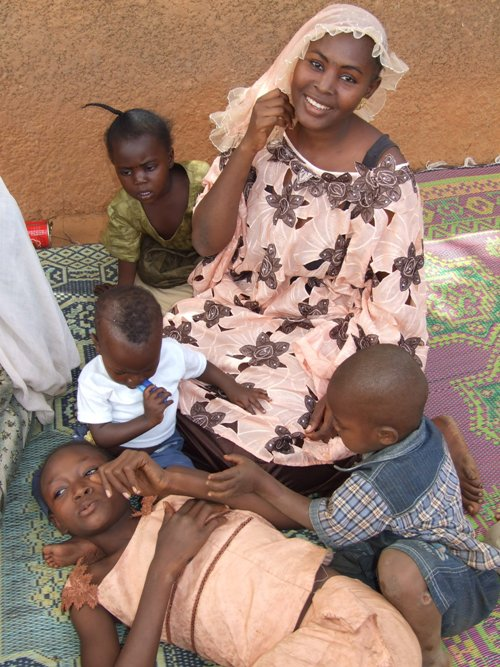
Niger has the highest TFR in the world at 6.73, in 2023.

Since the mid-20th-century baby boom that followed the end of World War II, declining fertility rates have been observed in many modern industrialized, affluent societies. Countries and geographic regions that are currently experiencing the highest rates of declining populations include Western Europe, Japan, the Russian Federation, and South Korea. Populations in other industrialized countries, such as the United Kingdom and the United States, and developing, poorer regions of the world, including the Balkans, Central Asia, the Middle East, and Sub-Saharan Africa, are also being impacted.

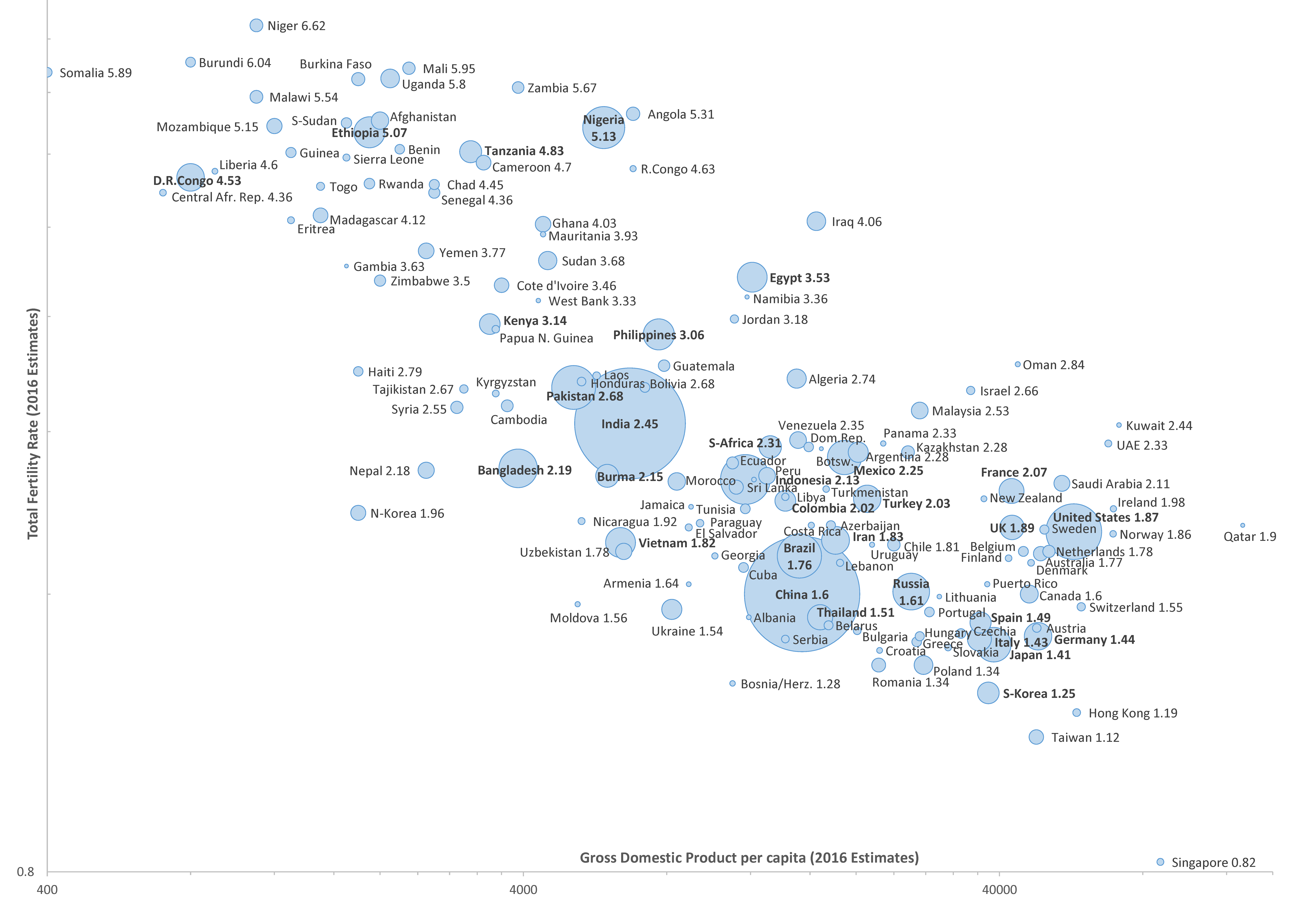
Total fertility rate vs per capita GDP for selected countries, 2016. Population size shown as bubble area. 30 largest countries in bold.

Fertility factors which determine the total fertility rate include social and economic inequality, employment stability, wealth disparities, religiosity, social media, social class, singlehood rates, affordable housing, and overpopulation. For instance, Nordic countries and France are among the least religious in Europe but have the highest TFR, while the opposite is true about Cyprus, Greece, Poland, Portugal, and Spain. The impact of human development on TFR can best be summarized by a quote from Karan Singh at the 1974 United Nations world population conference in Bucharest, where he declared that "development is the best contraceptive." Pay-as-you-go pension systems tend to act as a fertility insurance, reducing the incentive for fertility.

== National efforts to increase or decrease fertility ==
Governments have often set population targets, to either increase or decrease the total fertility rate, or to have certain ethnic or socioeconomic groups have a lower or higher fertility rate. Often such policies have been interventionist, and abusive. The most notorious natalist policies of the 20th century include those in communist Romania and communist Albania, under Nicolae Ceaușescu and Enver Hoxha respectively.

The natalist policy in Romania between 1967 and 1989 was very aggressive, including outlawing abortion and contraception, routine pregnancy tests for women, taxes on childlessness, and legal discrimination against childless people. It resulted in large numbers of children put into Romanian orphanages by parents who could not cope with raising them, street children in the 1990s, when many orphanages were closed and the children ended up on the streets, overcrowding in homes and schools, and over 9,000 women who died due to illegal abortions.

Conversely, in China the government sought to lower the fertility rate, and, as such, enacted the one-child policy (1978–2015), which included abuses such as forced abortions. In India, during the national emergency of 1975, a massive compulsory sterilization drive was carried out in India, but it is considered to be a failure and is criticized for being an abuse of power.

Some governments have sought to regulate which groups of society could reproduce through eugenic policies, including forced sterilizations of population groups they considered undesirable. Such policies were carried out against ethnic minorities in Europe and North America in the first half of the 20th century, and more recently in Latin America against the Indigenous population in the 1990s; in Peru, former President Alberto Fujimori has been accused of genocide and crimes against humanity as a result of a sterilization program put in place by his administration targeting indigenous people (mainly the Quechua and Aymara people).

Within these historical contexts, the notion of reproductive rights has developed. Such rights are based on the concept that each person freely decides if, when, and how many children to have - not the state or religion. According to the Office of the United Nations High Commissioner for Human Rights, reproductive rights "rest on the recognition of the basic rights of all couples and individuals to decide freely and responsibly the number, spacing and timing of their children and to have the information and means to do so, and the right to attain the highest standard of sexual and reproductive health. It also includes the right to make decisions concerning reproduction free of discrimination, coercion and violence, as expressed in human rights documents".

== History and future projections ==
From around 10,000 BC to the beginning of the Industrial Revolution, fertility rates around the world were high by 21st-century standards, ranging from 4.5 to 7.5 children per woman.^{76-77,}. The onset of the Industrial Revolution around the year 1800 brought about what has come to be called the demographic transition. This eventually led to a long-term decline in TFR in every region of the world that has continued in the 21st century.

It has been argued that cultural and social factors are not sufficient to explain this global decrease. Since the 1960s, global environmental contamination has been linked to significant effects of pollution on reproduction. Pollutants significantly interfere with all aspects of sexual reproduction from male and female fertility to fetal development, birth outcomes, and long-term health of offspring.

=== Before 1800 ===
During this period fertility rates of 4.5 to 7.5 were common around the world. ^{76-77} Child mortality could reach 50% and that plus the need to produce workers, male heirs, and old-age caregivers required a high fertility rate by 21st-century standards. To produce two adult children in this high mortality environment required at least four or more births. For example, fertility rates in Western Europe before 1800 ranged from 4.5 in Scandinavia to 6.2 in Belgium. In 1800, the TFR in the United States was 7.0. Fertility rates in East Asia during this period were similar to those in Europe. Fertility rates in Roman Egypt were 7.4.^{, p77}

Despite these high fertility rates, the number of surviving children per woman was always around two because of high mortality rates. As a result, global population growth was still very slow, about 0.04% per year.

=== 1800 to 1950 ===
After 1800, the Industrial Revolution began in some places, particularly Great Britain, continental Europe, and the United States, marked the beginnings of what is now called the demographic transition. Stage two of this process began as mortality decline accelerated. It involved a steady reduction in mortality rates due to improvements in public sanitation, personal hygiene and the food supply, with later contributions from vaccination (from 1796 onward), cholera-era water reforms (especially after the 1854 Broad Street cholera outbreak), germ theory adoption (1860s–1880s), and large-scale urban sewer and water systems in the mid-to-late 1800s, which reduced the number of famines and infectious disease outbreaks.

These reductions in mortality rates, particularly reductions in child mortality, that increased the fraction of children surviving, plus other major societal changes such as urbanization, and the increased social status of women, led to stage three of the demographic transition. There was a reduction in fertility rates, because there was simply no longer a need to birth so many children.

The example from the US of the correlation between child mortality and the fertility rate is illustrative. In 1800, child mortality in the US was 33%, meaning that one third of all children born would die before their fifth birthday. The TFR in 1800 was 7.0, meaning that the average female would bear seven children during their lifetime. In 1900, child mortality in the US had declined to 23%, a reduction of almost one third, and the TFR had declined to 3.9, a reduction of 44%. By 1950, child mortality had declined dramatically to 4%, a reduction of 84%, and the TFR declined to 3.2. By 2018, child mortality had declined further to 0.6% and the TFR declined to 1.9, below replacement level.

=== After 1950 ===
World historical TFR (1950–2020)
Years	Global Average	More developed regions	Less developed regions
1950–1955	4.86	2.84	5.94
1955–1960	5.01	2.75	6.15
1960–1965	4.70	2.71	5.64
1965–1970	5.08	2.51	6.23
1970–1975	4.83	2.32	5.87
1975–1980	4.08	2.01	4.88
1980–1985	3.75	1.89	4.40
1985–1990	3.52	1.82	4.03
1990–1995	3.31	1.78	3.71
1995–2000	2.88	1.58	3.18
2000–2005	2.73	1.57	2.98
2005–2010	2.62	1.61	2.81
2010–2015	2.59	1.69	2.74
2015–2020	2.52	1.67	2.66
2020–2025	2.35	1.51	2.47

The chart shows that the decline in the TFR since the 1960s has occurred in every region of the world. The global TFR is projected to continue declining for the remainder of the century, and reach a below-replacement level of 1.8 by 2100. It has been argued that cultural and social factors are not sufficient to explain this global decrease, and that it is related to widespread environmental contamination and the effects of pollution on reproduction.

In 2022, the global TFR was 2.3. Because the global fertility replacement rate for 2010–2015 was estimated to be 2.3, humanity has achieved or is approaching a significant milestone where the global fertility rate is equal to the global replacement rate.

The global fertility rate may have fallen below the global replacement level of 2.2 children per woman as early as 2023. Numerous developing countries have experienced an accelerated fertility decline in the 2010s and early 2020s. The average fertility rate in countries such as Thailand or Chile approached the mark of one child per woman, which triggered concerns about the rapid aging of populations worldwide.

==== Total fertility rates in 2050 and 2100 ====
The total fertility rate for six regions and the world, 1950-2100

The table shows that after 1965, the demographic transition spread around the world, and the global TFR began a long decline that continues in the 21st century.

== By region ==
The total fertility rate in OECD countries, 2023

The United Nations Population Division divides the world into six geographical regions. The table below shows the estimated TFR for each region.

Region	TFR (2015–2020)
Africa	4.4
Asia	2.2
Europe	1.6
Latin America and the Caribbean	2.0
Northern America	1.8
Oceania	2.4

In 2013, the TFR of Europe, Latin America and the Caribbean, and Northern America were below the global replacement-level fertility rate of 2.1 children per female.

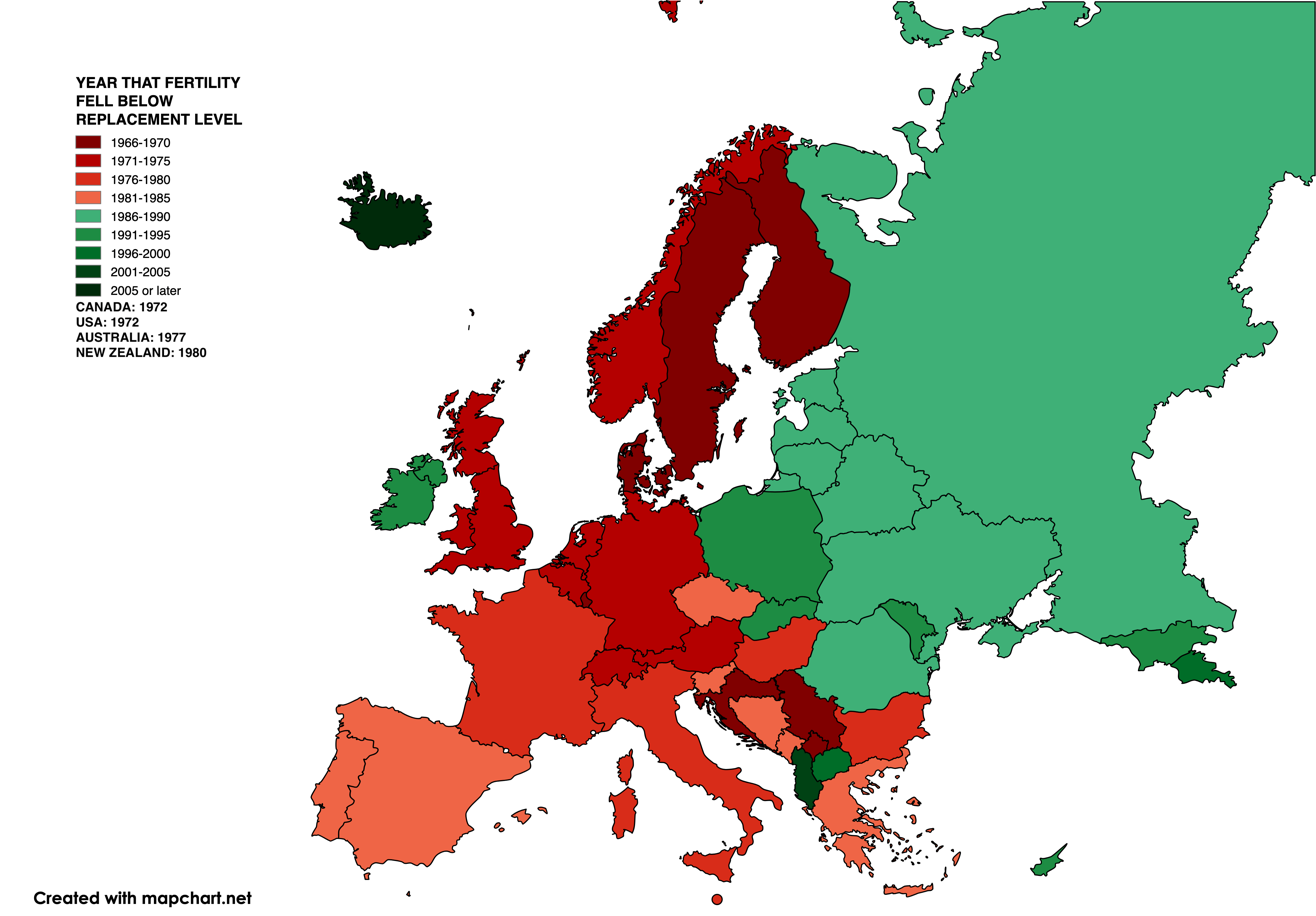
A map of when European fertility rates fell below replacement levels

=== Africa ===
Africa has a TFR of 4.1, the highest in the world. Angola, Benin, DR Congo, Mali, and the Niger have the highest TFR. In 2023, the most populous country in Africa, Nigeria, had an estimated TFR of 4.57. In 2023, the second most populous African country, Ethiopia, had an estimated TFR of 3.92.

The poverty of Africa, and the high maternal mortality and infant mortality had led to calls from WHO for family planning, and the encouragement of smaller families.

Within Africa, Sub-Saharan Africa has the highest fertility rate, with 27 out of the 30 countries with the highest fertility rates in the world being in Sub-Saharan Africa. As of 2021, 30% of all global births were in Sub-Saharan Africa. According to some estimates, by 2100 the share of the world's children born in sub-Saharan Africa will reach 55%, although other population projections suggest that fertility rates in Sub-Saharan Africa are declining faster than expected.

=== Asia ===
==== Eastern Asia ====
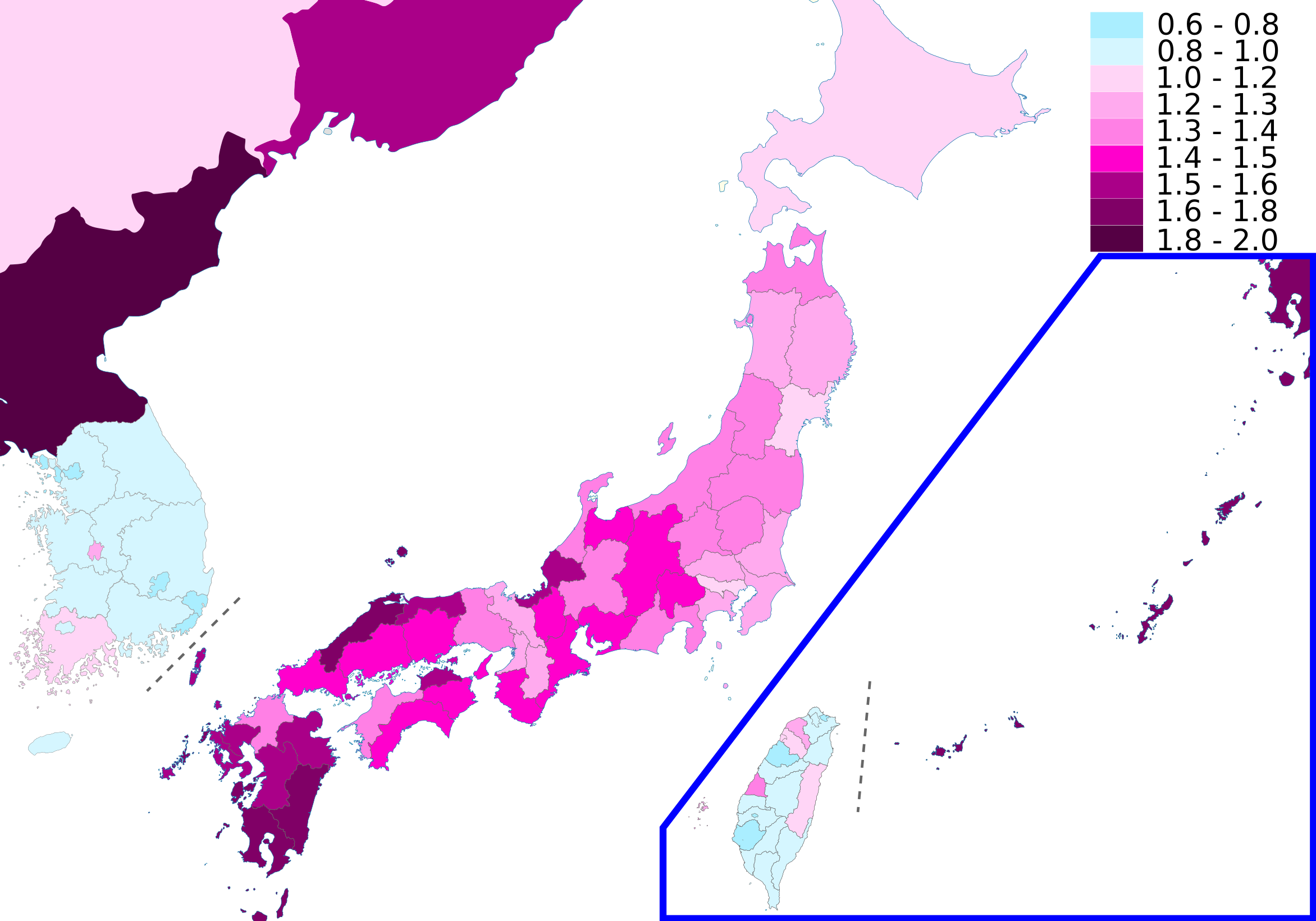
A map of East Asia by total fertility rate (TFR), 2021

Hong Kong, Macau, Singapore, South Korea, and Taiwan have the lowest-low fertility, defined as TFR at or below 1.3, and are among the lowest in the world. In 2004, Macau had a TFR below 1.0. In 2018, North Korea had the highest TFR in East Asia, at 1.95.

===== China =====
Birth rate in China (1950–2021)

In 2025, China's TFR was 0.87. China implemented the one-child policy in January 1979 as a drastic population planning measure to control the ever-growing population at the time. In January 2016, the policy was replaced with the two-child policy. In July 2021, a three-child policy was introduced, as China's population is aging faster than almost any other country in modern history.

===== Japan =====
In 2025, Japan had a TFR of 1.12. Japan's population is rapidly aging due to both a long life expectancy and a low birth rate. The total population is shrinking, losing 430,000 in 2018, to a total of 126.4 million. Hong Kong and Singapore mitigate this through immigrant workers. In Japan, a serious demographic imbalance has developed, partly due to limited immigration to Japan.

===== South Korea =====
In South Korea, a low birthrate is one of its most urgent socio-economic challenges. Rising housing expenses, shrinking job opportunities for younger generations, insufficient support to families with newborns either from the government or employers are among the major explanations for its crawling TFR, which fell to 0.92 in 2019. Koreans are yet to find viable solutions to make the birthrate rebound, even after trying out dozens of programs over a decade, including subsidizing rearing expenses, giving priorities for public rental housing to couples with multiple children, funding day care centers, reserving seats in public transportation for pregnant women, and so on.

In the past 20 years, South Korea has recorded some of the lowest fertility and marriage levels in the world. As of 2024, South Korea is the country with the world's lowest total fertility rate, at 0.73. In 2022, the TFR of the capital Seoul was 0.57.

==== Southern Asia ====
===== Bangladesh =====
The fertility rate fell from 6.8 in 1970–1975, to 2.0 in 2020, an interval of about 47 years, or a little less than two generations.

===== India =====
The Indian fertility rate has declined significantly over the early 21st century. The Indian TFR declined from 5.2 in 1971 to 2.2 in 2018. The TFR in India declined to 2.0 in 2019–2020, marking the first time it has gone below replacement level. In 2026 it is estimated to be around 1.9.

===== Iran =====
In the Iranian calendar year (March 2019 – March 2020), Iran's total fertility rate fell to 1.8.

==== Western Asia ====
In 2025, the TFR of Turkey reached 1.42.

=== Europe ===
EU fertility has declined in the 2020s.

The average total fertility rate in the European Union (EU-27) was calculated at 1.33 children per female in 2025. In 2025, Bulgaria had the highest TFR among EU countries at 1.63, followed by France (1.56), Slovenia (1.54), Denmark (1.51) and Ireland (1.50). In 2025, Malta had the lowest TFR among the EU countries, at 1.00. Other southern European countries also had very low TFR (Portugal 1.30, Cyprus 1.40, Greece 1.19, Spain 1.13, and Italy 1.14).

In 2025, the United Kingdom had a TFR of 1.39. In 2025 estimates for the non-EU European post-Soviet states group, Russia had a TFR of 1.37, Moldova 1.58, Ukraine 0.90, and Belarus 1.08.

Emigration of young adults from Eastern Europe to the West aggravates the demographic problems of those countries. People from countries such as Bulgaria, Moldova, Romania, and Ukraine are particularly moving abroad.

=== Latin America and the Caribbean ===
In 2023, the TFR of Brazil, the most populous country in the region, was estimated at 1.75. In 2021, the second most populous country, Mexico, had an estimated TFR of 1.73. The next most populous four countries in the region had estimated TFRs of between 1.9 and 2.2 in 2023, including Colombia (1.94), Argentina (2.17), Peru (2.18), and Venezuela (2.20). Belize had the highest estimated TFR in the region at 2.59 in 2023. In 2021, Puerto Rico had the lowest, at 1.25.

=== Northern America ===
==== Canada ====
In 2024, the TFR of Canada was 1.25.

==== United States ====
After a relatively stable birth rate for thirty years, the number of live births per 100 women aged 15 to 44 resumed a decline beginning in 2008.

The fertility rate in the U.S. has been in a downward trend, and is now below the replacement rate of 2.1 births.

The US rate of natural increase—birth rate minus death rate—has declined, indicating slower population growth.

The total fertility rate in the United States after World War II peaked at about 3.8 children per female in the late 1950s, dropped to below replacement in the early 1970s, and by 1999 was at 2 children. Currently, the fertility is below replacement among those native born, and above replacement among immigrant families, most of whom come to the US from countries with higher fertility. However, the fertility rate of immigrants to the US has been found to decrease sharply in the second generation, correlating with improved education and income. In 2025, the US TFR was 1.59, ranging between over 1.9 in some states and under 1.4 in others.

=== Oceania ===
==== Australia ====
After World War II, Australia's TFR was approximately 3.0. In 2017, Australia's TFR was 1.74, i.e. below replacement.

== See also ==
- List of countries by total fertility rate
- Birth rate
- Fertility and intelligence
- Income and fertility
- List of countries by past fertility rate
- Sub-replacement fertility
- Zero population growth
