= Paul Popenoe =

American eugenicist (1888–1979)

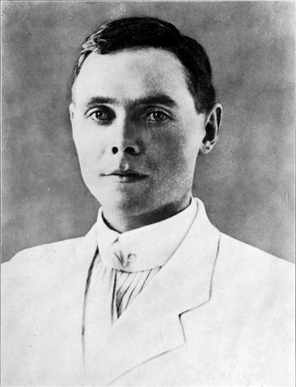
- Popenoe in 1915
- Born: Paul Bowman Popenoe; October 16, 1888; Topeka, Kansas, U.S.
- Died: June 19, 1979 (aged 90); Miami, Florida, U.S.
- Spouse: Betty Stankowitch (m. 1920; died 1978)

Paul Bowman Popenoe (October 16, 1888 – June 19, 1979) was an American marriage counselor, eugenicist and agricultural explorer. He was an influential advocate of the compulsory sterilization of mentally ill people and people with mental disabilities, and the father of marriage counseling in the United States.

== Personal life ==
Born Paul Bowman Popenoe in Topeka, Kansas, in 1888, he was the son of Marion Bowman Popenoe and Frederick Oliver Popenoe, a pioneer of the avocado industry. (Popenoe dropped his middle name early in life.) He moved to California as a teen. After attending Occidental College for two years and Stanford University for his junior year majoring in English with coursework in biology, Popenoe left school to care for his father and worked for several years as a newspaper editor.

Popenoe married Betty Stankowitch in New York on August 23, 1920. They remained married until her death on June 26, 1978. He died less than a year later, on June 19, 1979 in Miami, Florida, at the age of 90.

The youngest of Paul Popenoe's four sons, David Popenoe, became a sociology professor who was a prominent advocate for "rebuilding a marriage culture" and reviving the "married-parent nuclear family."

== Biology and eugenics ==
Popenoe worked briefly as an agricultural explorer collecting date specimens in Western Asia and Northern Africa for his father's nursery in California, along with his younger brother, Wilson Popenoe, a horticulturist. His travels received considerable support and interest from the US Department of Agriculture. Paul Popenoe published his first book, Date Growing in the Old World and the New, in 1913.

In the mid-1910s, Popenoe became interested in human breeding and edited the Journal of Heredity from 1913 to 1917, with a special attention to eugenics and social hygiene.

By 1918, Popenoe had become well-established enough to co-author (with Roswell Hill Johnson) a popular college textbook on eugenics (Applied Eugenics, edited by Richard T. Ely), which outlined his vision of a eugenics program that primarily relied on the segregation of "waste humanity" into rural institutions, where they would perform manual labor to offset the cost of their institutionalization. He opposed child labor because he believed that people whom he regarded as unfit members of society would have fewer children if their children were not allowed to work. Additionally, Applied Eugenics contains a chapter expounding on Popenoe's belief in the racial inferiority of black people.

An elementary knowledge of the history of Africa, or the more recent and much-quoted example of Haiti, is sufficient to prove that the Negro's own social heritage is at a level far below that of the whites among whom he is living in the United States.... The Negro race is germinally lacking in the higher developments of intelligence.

During World War I, Popenoe was inducted into the officer corps of the US Army. Under the War Department Commission on Training Camp Activities, he was charged with rooting out liquor and prostitution in an effort to reduce the high incidence of venereal disease in US troops.

In the mid-1920s, Popenoe began working with E.S. Gosney, a wealthy California financier, and the Human Betterment Foundation to promote eugenic policies in California. In 1909, California had enacted its first compulsory sterilization law to allow for the sterilization of the mentally ill and the intellectually disabled in its state psychiatric hospitals. With Popenoe as his scientific workhorse, Gosney intended to study the sterilization work done in California and to use it to advocate sterilization in other parts of the country and in the world at large. That would culminate in a number of works, most prominently their joint-authored Sterilization for Human Betterment: A Summary of Results of 6,000 Operations in California, 1909-1929 in 1929. The work would become a popular text for the advocacy of sterilization, as it purported to be an objective study of the operations in the state and concluded, unsurprisingly, that rigorous programs for the sterilization of the "unfit" were beneficial to all involved, including the sterilized patients. In the 1930s, he served as a member of the American Eugenics Society's board of directors, along with Charles B. Davenport, Henry H. Goddard, Madison Grant, Harry H. Laughlin, and Gosney, among others.

In 1929, he received an honorary Sc.D. degree from Occidental College, which he had attended. Thenceforth, he commonly referred to himself as "Dr. Popenoe". In 1976, Popenoe also received the Auld Lang Syne award from Occidental. However, on April 26, 2019, Occidental rescinded the honorary Sc.D. degree after a unanimous vote of its board of trustees. Leading up to that vote, Occidental Professor Peter Dreier wrote an opinion article in March 2019 about the college's historical role in eugenics and racism, and 86 percent of the college's faculty then signed a statement urging the board to revoke the degree granted to Popenoe 90 years earlier.

== Marriage and family counseling ==
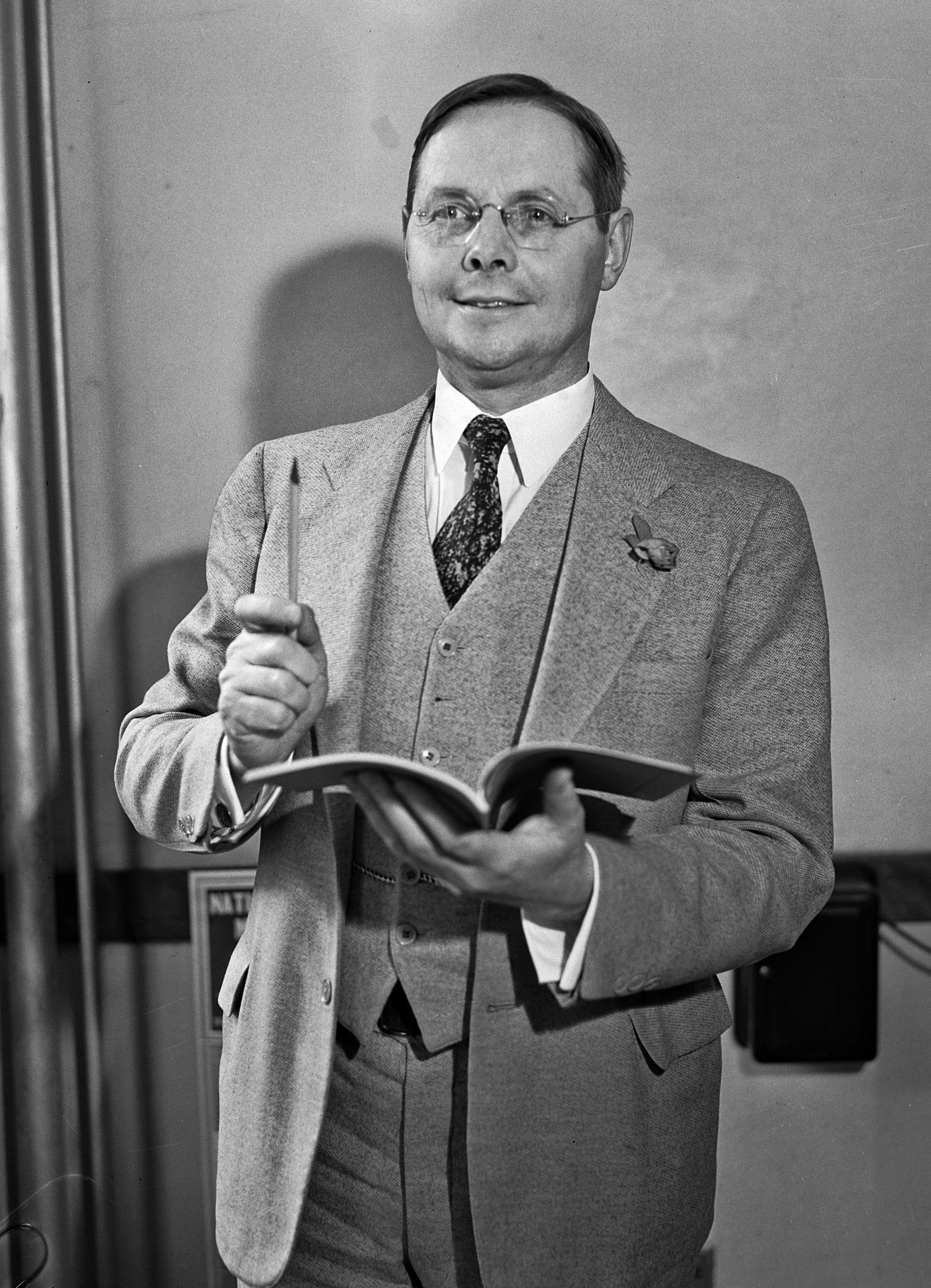
Paul B. Popenoe in 1931

Along with his advocacy of sterilization programs, Popenoe was also interested in using the principles of German and Austrian marriage consultation services for eugenic purposes. Aghast at the divorce rate in US society, Popenoe came to the conclusion that "unfit" families would reproduce out of wedlock, but "fit" families would need to be married to reproduce. With financial help from Gosney, he opened the American Institute of Family Relations in Los Angeles in 1930. It was described in 1960 as "the world's largest and best known marriage-counseling center," with a staff of seventy.

One of the greatest dangers in the use of sterilization is that overzealous persons who have not thought through the subject will look at it as a cure-all, and apply it to all sorts of ends for which it is not adapted. It is only one of many measures the state can and must use to protect itself from [the human race's] deterioration.

For a while, Popenoe's two major interests, eugenics and marriage counseling, ran in parallel, and he published extensively on both topics. As public interest in eugenics waned, Popenoe focused more of his energies into marriage counseling and during public rejection of eugenics at the end of World War II, with the revelation of the Holocaust, Popenoe had thoroughly redefined himself as primarily a marriage counselor, which had lost most of its explicit eugenic overtones. Over time, he became more prominent in the field of counseling.

Popenoe favored a popular, rather than academic, approach. In that vein, he appeared on the Art Linkletter television show for over a decade, and he regularly gave lectures and wrote mainstream articles for the general public. For many years, he had a nationally syndicated newspaper column promoting marriage and family life. As presented in a 1960 biography, the focus areas of his counseling approach and the American Institute of Family Relations included couples' attitudes towards marriage, preparation (including sexuality education), moral values, a focus on action, and mutual understanding between the sexes.

At the peak of his career, he co-founded and edited Ladies' Home Journal's most popular column of all time, "Can This Marriage Be Saved?" In 1960, he co-authored (with Dorothy Disney) the book of the same name. His introduction to the book catalogued some of the statistics of the American Institute of Family Relations over its first 30 years. Under his direction, the institute gave intensive training to over 300 marriage counselors and shorter courses around the US to over 1500 other people. The caseload averaged about 15,000 consultations per year. From the files of the numerous cases came the material for the "Can This Marriage Be Saved?" book and serial. The institute published a bulletin, "Family Life," monthly or bimonthly for decades.

Given the role of clergy in responding to crisis in families, Popenoe increased focus in training the clergy over many years. That culminated in 1978 with the American Institute of Family Relations creating the Pastoral Psychotherapy Training Program, which offered the Master of Arts in Pastoral Psychotherapy. It was the second offering of a master's degree by the institute.

As Popenoe maintained his traditional values (chastity before marriage), changes in popular culture such as feminism and sexual revolution challenged his approach. At the same time, thought leaders in the helping professions tended more and more to favor self-fulfillment over preservation of the family. That led Popenoe to ally increasingly with religious conservatives even though he was not religious himself. For example, one of his assistants was James Dobson, who founded Focus on the Family in 1977. In the US society of the third millennium, the approach Popenoe developed to marriage counseling, educational and directive rather than medical or psychological, is becoming fashionable again. In the end, the American Institute of Family Relations turned out to be highly dependent on Popenoe's leadership. It closed in the 1980s, not long after Paul Popenoe's death.

== Archives ==
Shortly before his death, Popenoe transferred his papers to the University of Wyoming. In 2002, the American Heritage Center of the University of Wyoming reported the collection Paul Bowman Popenoe Papers, 1874–1991, consisting of 85 cubic feet (2.4 m³) of material. The archives of the Human Betterment Foundation are in Special Collections at Caltech in Pasadena.

== Publications ==
Books

- Popenoe, Paul (1913). Date Growing in the Old World and the New. Altadena, CA: West India Gardens.
- Popenoe, Paul; Johnson, Roswell Hill (1918). Applied Eugenics (First ed.). New York, NY, US: The Macmillan Company.
- Popenoe, Paul (1923). The Conservation of The Family. London.
- Popenoe, Paul (1925). Modern Marriage: A Handbook. New York, NY.
- Popenoe, Paul (1926). Problems of Human Reproduction. Baltimore, Maryland, US: The Williams & Wilkins Company.
- Popenoe, Paul (1929). The Child's Heredity (First ed.). Baltimore, Maryland, US: The Williams & Wilkins Company.
- Gosney, E.S.; Popenoe, Paul (1929). Sterilization for Human Betterment: A Summary of Results of 6,000 Operations in California, 1909-1929. New York, New York, US: The Macmillan Company.
- Popenoe, Paul (1930). Practical applications of heredity. Baltimore, MD.
- Popenoe, Paul; Gosney, E.S. (1938). Twenty-eight years of sterilization in California. Pasadena, CA: Human Betterment Foundation.
- Popenoe, Paul (1940) [1925]. Modern Marriage (Second ed.). New York, New York, US: The Macmillan Company.*Popenoe, Paul (1954). Sex - Happiness or Tragedy?. California, US: Samuel Newman Productions.
- Popenoe, Paul (1959). Bayless, Kenneth M. (ed.). Divorce--17 Ways to Avoid It. Martin, William H. Los Angeles, California, US: Trend Books, Incorporated. Trend Book No. 184.
- Duvall, Evelyn Millis; Mace, David R.; Popenoe, Paul (1964). The Church Looks at Family Life (First ed.). Nashville, Tennessee, US: Broadman Press. pp. 114–167. Library of Congress number: 64-21162.

Articles

- Popenoe, Paul (1917). "The blind cave fish". Journal of Heredity. 8 (10): 448–451. doi:10.1093/oxfordjournals.jhered.a111642.
- Popenoe, Paul (February 1922). "Costa Rica, the Land of the Banana". The National Geographic Magazine. 41 (2): 201–220.
- Popenoe, Paul (1927). "Marriage rate among nurses". Eugenical News. 12 (1): 8.
- Popenoe, Paul (1927). "Back to Methuselah?". Scientific Monthly. 25: 535–539.
- Popenoe, Paul (1931). "Heredity and mental deficiency". Mental Hygiene. 15 (3): 570–575.
- Popenoe, Paul (1934). "The German Sterilization Law". Journal of Heredity. 25 (7): 257–261. doi:10.1093/oxfordjournals.jhered.a103937.
- Ladd-Taylor, Molly (2001). "Eugenics, Sterilisation and Modern Marriage in the USA: The Strange Career of Paul Popenoe". Gender & History. 13 (2): 298–327. doi:10.1111/1468-0424.00230. S2CID 143615616.
- "Springing Into Action". Occidental Magazine. June 5, 2019.
- Dreier, Peter (June 23, 2019). "Why Occidental College Revoked a 1929 Honorary Degree to White Supremacist Paul Popenoe". Public Seminar.

== See also ==
- Eugenics in California
- Eugenics in the United States
- Compulsory sterilization
- Relationship counseling
