= List of Batman children's books =

This is a list of Batman children's books, picture books published in the United States, beginning in the year 2008.

#	Title	Author	Publisher	Date	Genre	Length
1	The Dark Knight: I Am Batman	Catherine Hapka	HarperCollins	June 3, 2008	Children's picture book, Superhero, Action-adventure	32 pp
Based on the 2008 blockbuster film The Dark Knight, Batman sees the Bat-Signal and then goes after the Joker.
2	The Dark Knight: Batman's Friends and Foes	Catherine Hapka	Turtleback Books	June 3, 2008	Children's picture book, Superhero	29 pp
Describes the work that Batman does keeping Gotham City safe, those who help him in that work, and fights his enemies.
3	The Dark Knight: Batman versus the Joker	N.T. Raymond	HarperFestival	June 3, 2008	Children's picture book, Superhero	24 pp
Batman tries to stop Joker's crime spree.
4	The Dark Knight: Batman Saves the Day	Jennifer Frantz	HarperFestival	June 3, 2008	Children's picture book, Superhero,	pp
Bruce Wayne's friends throw him a birthday party. But a surprise guest shows up to spoil the fun—it's the Joker! Can Batman get there in time to save the day?
5	Catwoman's Classroom of Claws	Scott Sonneborn	Capstone, Inc.	August 2009	Children's picture book	56 pp
Robin finds out that Catwoman is instructing super villains.
6	Arctic Attack	Robert Greenberger	Capstone, Inc.	August 2009	Children's picture book, Superhero, Action-adventure	56 pp
Batman and Robin go after Ra's al Ghul who is causing disasters in the environment.
7	Batman: Meet the Super Heroes	Michael Teitelbaum	HarperCollins	December 2009	Children's picture book	32 pp
Batman, Superman, and Wonder Woman fight against a dragon.
8	Batman Classic: Gotham's Villains Unleashed!	John Sazaklis	HarperFestival	December 22, 2009	Children's picture book	24 pp
Batman and Robin try to stop Joker and released Arkham Asylum inmates.
9	Terror on Dinosaur Island!	Jake Black	Grosset & Dunlap	January 2010	Children's picture book	48 pp
This is based on the Batman: The Brave and the Bold episode of the same name. Batman and Plastic Man try to stop Gorilla Grodd's plan to de-evolve humans.
10	The Eyes of Despero!	Jake Black	Grosset & Dunlap	May 2010	Children's picture book	48 pp
This is based on the Batman: The Brave and the Bold episode of the same name. Batman and the Green Lantern Corps battle Despero.
11	Batman Classic: Feline Felonies	John Sazaklis	HarperFestival	June 2010	Children's picture book	24 pp
Batman and Wonder Woman team up to stop Catwoman and Cheetah.
12	Trapped in Time	Tracey West	Grosset & Dunlap	September 2010	Children's chapter book	80 pp
This is a choose your own path-type book based on Batman: The Brave and the Bold.
13	Batman Classic: Batman and the Toxic Terror	Jodi Huelin	HarperFestival	March 1, 2011	Children's picture book, Superhero, Action	24 pp
Gotham City is going green! People everywhere are turning into trees, and it's all the work of that vile, plant-loving villainess Poison Ivy. Will Batman fall victim to her thorny vengeance or can he nip this scheme in the bud?
14	Batman Classic: Dawn of the Dynamic Duo	John Sazaklis	HarperCollins	November 1, 2011	Children's picture book, Superhero	32 pp
Batman and Robin go up against Two-Face.
15	Batman Classic: Reptile Rampage	Katharine Turner	HarperCollins	April 17, 2012	Children's picture book, superhero	32 pp
A Gotham City hospital is being terrorized by Killer Croc, and it's up to Batman to save the day! Can the Caped Crusader clean the city sewers of this rotten reptile?
16	Batman Classic: Fright Club	John Sazaklis, Jeremy Roberts	HarperFestival	May 29, 2012	Children's picture book, Superhero story	24 pp
The Joker and Harley Quinn have joined forces with the Scarecrow and Mad Hatter and are terrorizing the citizens of Gotham City. Can Batman and Robin put the Fright Club out of business or will they fall prey to the madness and mayhem as well?
17	Batman Classic: Batman versus Man-Bat	J.E. Bright	HarperCollins	August 28, 2012	Children's picture book, Superhero, Action	32 pp
When a half-man, half-bat creature attacks Gotham City, the police think Batman has gone mad. To clear his name, Batman has to defeat the fiendish foe.
18	Batman Classic: The Penguin's Arctic Adventure	Donald Lemke	HarperFestival	December 23, 2014	Children's picture book, Superhero	24 pp
When Oswald Chesterfield Cobblepot, also known as the Penguin, opens an exotic animals garden in Gotham City, Batman investigates to discover if the garden has a connection to the businessmen in town who have gone missing. With Robin's help, the World's Greatest Detective must stop the Penguin and the evil sorceress Circe —or else the Dynamic Duo might become part of the exhibit, too.
19	Batman Classic: Nightmare in Gotham City	Donald Lemke	HarperFestival	May 12, 2015	Children's picture book, Superhero, Thriller, Action	24 pp
When the Gotham City Police Department hosts a special Halloween haunted house, one of Gotham's darkest criminals turns this spooky evening into a night of terror. It's up to Batman to stop Scarecrow and put this nightmare to bed.
