= Parapinnixa affinis =

Conservation status
- Endangered (IUCN 2.3)

Scientific classification
- Kingdom: Animalia
- Phylum: Arthropoda
- Class: Malacostraca
- Order: Decapoda
- Suborder: Pleocyemata
- Infraorder: Brachyura
- Family: Parapinnixidae
- Genus: Parapinnixa
- Species: P. affinis

Binomial name
- Parapinnixa affinis Holmes, 1900

Species of crab

Parapinnixa affinis, the California Bay pea crab, is a species of pinnotherid crab endemic to Southern California. It is a small crab that lives commensally in the tube of a tube-dwelling worm. It was one of the first marine crustaceans to be included on the IUCN Red List in 1996.

== Description ==
Parapinnixa affinis is similar to other pea crabs of the genus Parapinnixa, especially P. nitida. It differs from P. nitida in the proportions of its carapace, which is more than twice as wide as long in P. nitida but less than twice as wide as long in P. affinis. The carapace is approximately 4.5 mm × 2.5 mm (0.177 in × 0.098 in) wide, with a maximum of 6.0 mm × 3.6 mm (0.24 in × 0.14 in). The carapace is usually "light amber mottled with dark ochre", but 5% of crabs are albino.

== Distribution ==
Parapinnixa affinis appears to be endemic to Southern California, having been recorded from San Pedro, Anaheim Landing, Newport Bay and San Diego. It was once recorded from Siberia, but this record is doubtful.

== Conservation and ecology ==
Parapinnixa affinis was one of only two marine crustaceans to be included on the IUCN's list of endangered species in 1996, the other being the coconut crab. Many others have been added later.

It lives commensally in the tubes of the polychaete worms Terebella californica and Loimia. A bryozoan from the family Vesiculariidae is sometimes found on the legs of P. affinis.

== Taxonomy ==
Parapinnixa affinis was first described by Samuel Jackson Holmes in 1900, in his Synopsis of California stalk-eyed Crustacea. The type specimen was a single female, collected in July 1895 from Dead Man's Island, San Pedro, California (now part of the Port of Los Angeles); it was donated to the University of California. P. affinis no longer lives at the type locality, which has been made unsuitable by the accumulation of "harbor refuse and oil". No further specimens were collected for over thirty years, until one was collected in 1930, and Steve Glassell collected specimens including an allotype in 1932.
