= Marian Olden =

American sterilization proponent

Marian Stephenson Olden (Note: Olden was born Marian Stephenson. Until 1941, she used the name "Marion S. Norton" or "Marion Coleman-Norton" professionally. From 1941, she wrote under the name "Marian S. Olden".) (1881–1981) was an American eugenics activist and an influential figure in the sterilization movement. She founded the Sterilization League of New Jersey in 1937, which unsuccessfully lobbied for New Jersey to pass a law enabling the compulsory sterilization of those considered unfit to procreate. In the years following World War II, the sterilization movement distanced itself from Olden, whose increasingly unpopular views on compulsory sterilization, and abrasive, uncompromising personality were seen as liabilities. The Sterilization League, then known as Birthright Inc., formally severed ties with Olden in 1948.

== Early life ==
Olden was born in Philadelphia in 1881. She had two younger sisters. Her father, Arthur H. Stephenson, was a textile merchant. He died of typhoid fever in 1902, when Olden was fourteen.

At the age of 30, Olden began to follow the New Thought spiritual movement. She moved to New Jersey in the 1930s after marrying Princeton University professor Paul R. Coleman-Norton.

== Activism ==
=== Background ===
The eugenics movement came to attain wide support over the first two decades of the 20th century, with the United States especially embracing eugenic research and policies. Eugenic sterilization laws began to be passed by individual US states in the early 20th century, and the 1927 Supreme Court case Buck v. Bell affirmed that such laws were constitutional. By the end of 1931, 28 states had passed eugenic sterilization legislation.

=== Introduction to eugenics movement ===
Olden was introduced to the ideas of the eugenics movement while working as a volunteer social worker in New Jersey in the 1930s. She formed a study group on matters of public health in 1934, which led her to eugenic literature such as Edwin Grant Conklin's Heredity and Environment in the Development of Man (1917) and Herbert Spencer Jennings's The Biological Basis of Human Nature (1930). She brought her study group on field trips to state mental hospitals, where physicians and staff expressed support for compulsory sterilization of patients, reasoning that this would prevent them from passing their ailments to future generations, as well as freeing up capacity in their institutions, on the basis that certain patients, if sterilized, could be released into the community without fear that they would conceive children which they would be unable to care for.

Olden drafted a sterilization bill which she attempted to promote to New Jersey lawmakers through a campaign organized with the League of Women Voters in 1935. The failure of this campaign led Olden to found a new organization dedicate specifically to advocating for compulsory sterilization, the Sterilization League of New Jersey.

=== Sterilization League of New Jersey ===
Olden founded the Sterilization League of New Jersey in Trenton, New Jersey in January 1937, and acted as the group's secretary. The League had 23 founding members, and within the first year of its existence, grew to 373. Olden travelled to Nazi Germany in 1938, where she was welcomed by lawyer Falk Ruttke. During the visit, Olden agreed to collaborate with Ruttke on a German film to promote eugenic sterilization.

In 1939, Olden tried again to push a sterilization bill through the New Jersey legislature, this time using the resources of the Sterilization League. The bill proposed by the League would have empowered a "state eugenicist" who could petition for the sterilization of unfit state residents to a newly established "State Eugenic Council". Such individuals would be sterilized, even against their objection, unless they launched a successful appeal to the council. Due to its compulsory nature, the bill was not supported by organizations which were generally supportive of sterilization, such as the League of Women Voters and the New Jersey Birth Control League. The bill ultimately died without being debated on the floor of the legislature.

In 1943, the Sterilization League of New Jersey rebranded under the name Birthright, Inc., the name chosen as an allusion to a 1930 speech given by president Herbert Hoover in which he promised that "there shall be no child in America that has not the complete birthright of a sound mind in a sound body, and that has not been born under proper conditions." Olden had instead advocated for the name "Sterilization League for Human Betterment", in reference to Ezra S. Gosney's Human Betterment Foundation. The rebranding of the organization was intended to soften its image, and distance itself from eugenic themes, which were becoming unpopular due to their association with the eugenic program of Nazi Germany. Rather than improvement of the genetic stock, Birthright reframed its goal as protecting the country's children, and ensuring they were born and raised under proper conditions.

Despite this shift, Olden, along with other Birthright members, continued to harbor eugenic goals. Olden in particular continued to speak bluntly in terms of eugenic sterilization, despite its unpopularity.

Olden's strident views and abrasive personality made her time with the organization sometimes contentious. She clashed with a number of other prominent activists, including Clarence Gamble, who left Birthright in 1947 as a result of his disagreements with Olden. Olden reserved the right to review all of the organization's incoming and outgoing mail, with one colleague branding her a "dictator". By 1948, Olden had lost the support of Birthright's executive committee. The organization's president, H. Curtis Wood, advised Olden that it would be better for the movement if Olden stopped coming to meetings. In January 1948, Wood wrote to Olden:

If you feel you must continue this battle for the sake of your ego I can assure you that most of us will drop out of the picture entirely, as we are just not willing to give our time to these fruitless and upsetting personality problems. It is Birthright we are concerned about and not the emotional mal-adjustments of our staff, regardless of the causes and justification for them.

In June 1948, the executive committee voted to sever "formal connection on a salary basis" with Olden.
