= Taylor–Johnson Temperament Analysis =

Taylor–Johnson Temperament Analysis (T-JTA) is a personality test designed to measure nine common personality traits for the assessment of individual adjustment. The T-JTA is a revision by Robert M. Taylor and Lucile P. Morrison of the Johnson Temperament Analysis (JTA) developed by Dr. Roswell H. Johnson in 1941.

The T-JTA was designed to measure personality variables or attitudes and behavioral tendencies that are claimed by the test's authors to influence personal, social, marital, parental, family, scholastic, and vocational adjustment.

The Taylor–Johnson Temperament Analysis and its acronym are registered trademarks of its publisher, Psychological Publications, Inc.

== Historical Development ==
The Taylor–Johnson Temperament Analysis (T-JTA) is a complete revision of the Johnson Temperament Analysis (JTA). The JTA was developed by Roswell H. Johnson, Ph.D., who served as a director at the American Institute of Family Relations in Los Angeles from 1935 until his retirement in 1960. The JTA was published in 1941, and in addition to its general use as a personality test, it was used extensively in premarital and marital counseling. During the early years of its development, the JTA was administered at the American Institute of Family Relations to men and women who sought counseling for personal or interpersonal problems, or who volunteered to take part in Dr. Johnson's continuing research. It was estimated by Donald P. Wilson, Ph.D., Director of Research at the Institute, that following the test's publication, from 1941 to 1962, at least 70,000 different individuals took the test at that counseling center alone. At the request of Dr. Johnson, his associates at the Institute, Robert M. Taylor, Director of Counseling, and Lucile P. Morrison, staff counselor, undertook a revision in 1963. In 1966 the Taylor–Johnson Temperament Analysis (T-JTA) was first published.

== About the T-JTA ==
The Taylor–Johnson Temperament Analysis measures 9 personality traits and their polar opposites.

- Nervous ↔ Composed
- Depressive ↔ Lighthearted
- Active-Social ↔ Quiet
- Expressive-Responsive ↔ Inhibited
- Sympathetic ↔ Indifferent
- Subjective ↔ Objective
- Dominant ↔ Submissive
- Hostile ↔ Tolerant
- Self-Disciplined ↔ Impulsive

The test consists of 180 questions equally divided among the nine bipolar traits measured by the test. The T-JTA provides an evaluation in visual form that portrays the respondent's feelings about himself or herself. In addition, the respondent can answer the questions as they apply to a significant other.
