= Frederick Osborn =

American philanthropist, general, and eugenicist (1889–1981)

Frederick Henry Osborn
- Born: March 21, 1889; New York, U.S.
- Died: January 5, 1981 (aged 91); New York, U.S.
- Education: Princeton University; Trinity College, Cambridge
- Military career
- Allegiance: United States
- Branch: United States Army
- Service years: 1940–1944
- Rank: Major General
- Conflicts: World War II
- Other work: philanthropist

Major General Frederick Henry Osborn CBE (March 21, 1889 – January 5, 1981) was an American philanthropist, military leader, and eugenicist. He was a founder of several organizations and played a central part in reorienting eugenics away from overt racism in the years leading up to World War II. The American Philosophical Society considers him to have been "the respectable face of eugenic research in the post-war period." Osborn was the nephew of the paleontologist Henry Fairfield Osborn.

== World War I and the founding of organizations ==
Osborn graduated from Princeton University in 1910 and attended Trinity College, Cambridge, for a postgraduate year. His family had made their fortune in the railroad business, and he went into the family business up until the outbreak of World War I, when he served in the American Red Cross in France as Commander of the Advance Zone for the last 11 months of the war. In 1928, he retired from industry and became a research associate at the American Museum of Natural History studying eugenics, anthropology, and population.

Osborn was one of the founding members of the American Eugenics Society in 1926 and joined the British Eugenics Society in 1928, serving as its Secretary in 1931. Osborn was also instrumental in the founding of the Population Association of America in 1931. He played a central role in the 1936 founding of the Office of Population Research at Princeton University, a leading demographic research and training center. Osborn was one of the founding trustees of the Pioneer Fund in 1937, a charitable foundation charged with promoting eugenics. Also in 1937, Osborn praised the Nazi eugenics programs as the "most important experiment which has ever been tried."

According to J. Phillipe Rushton, Osborn was the first to point out that although African Americans scored lower than whites on the Army intelligence tests, those from five urban northern states scored slightly higher than whites from eight rural southern states did, demonstrating the influence of cultural factors on IQ scores.

In the following decades, Osborn remained skeptical of the hereditarian hypothesis of the variance in IQ scores found between racial groups. He suspected that environment played a greater role than genetics in the shaping of human beings, and thought eugenics should take place within groups (well-adapted families should be given the means to have more children) rather than between them (inferior races should be replaced).

An admirer of the reforms instituted in 1930s Sweden through the efforts of economist Gunnar Myrdal and his wife Alva Myrdal, Osborn emphasized the eugenic potential of extended state support in childcare, recreation, housing, nursery services, and education as a means of stimulating fertility among desirable populations. He argued that the aim of eugenics should be to ensure that every child was wanted. Osborn believed that in this system, which he called the "true freedom of parenthood," the parents most capable of rearing children would be likelier to have more.

== World War II and later life ==
Many civil rights leaders alleged that, even after the revelation of genocide in World War II, eugenic influences remained strong in the United States because of Osborn and other leaders of the Population Council (including John D. Rockefeller, Lewis Strauss, Karl Compton, and Detlev Bronk). He also encouraged and endorsed programs in Nazi Germany that sterilized Jews, Poles, and others deemed "unsuitable" to breed. Although Hitler's genocidal tactics and acts caused revulsion in the United States, he continued to promote eugenic ideals.

In 1940, Osborn was selected by Franklin Roosevelt to chair the Civilian Advisory Committee on Selective Service. Five months later, he took over as Chair of the Army Committee on Welfare and Recreation, responsible for information and education services for military personnel. In September 1941, he was commissioned as Brigadier General and appointed Chief of the Morale Branch of the War Department (later called the Information and Education Division of Special Services). By the war's end, he had earned promotion to Major General and had been awarded a Bronze Star in Paris, the Distinguished Service Medal, and the Selective Service Medal, and he was made Honorary Commander in the Most Excellent Order of the British Empire.

Osborn served at Princeton, as a charter trustee from 1943 to 1955, and as a member of several advisory boards, including the Curriculum Committee and Psychology Department Council.

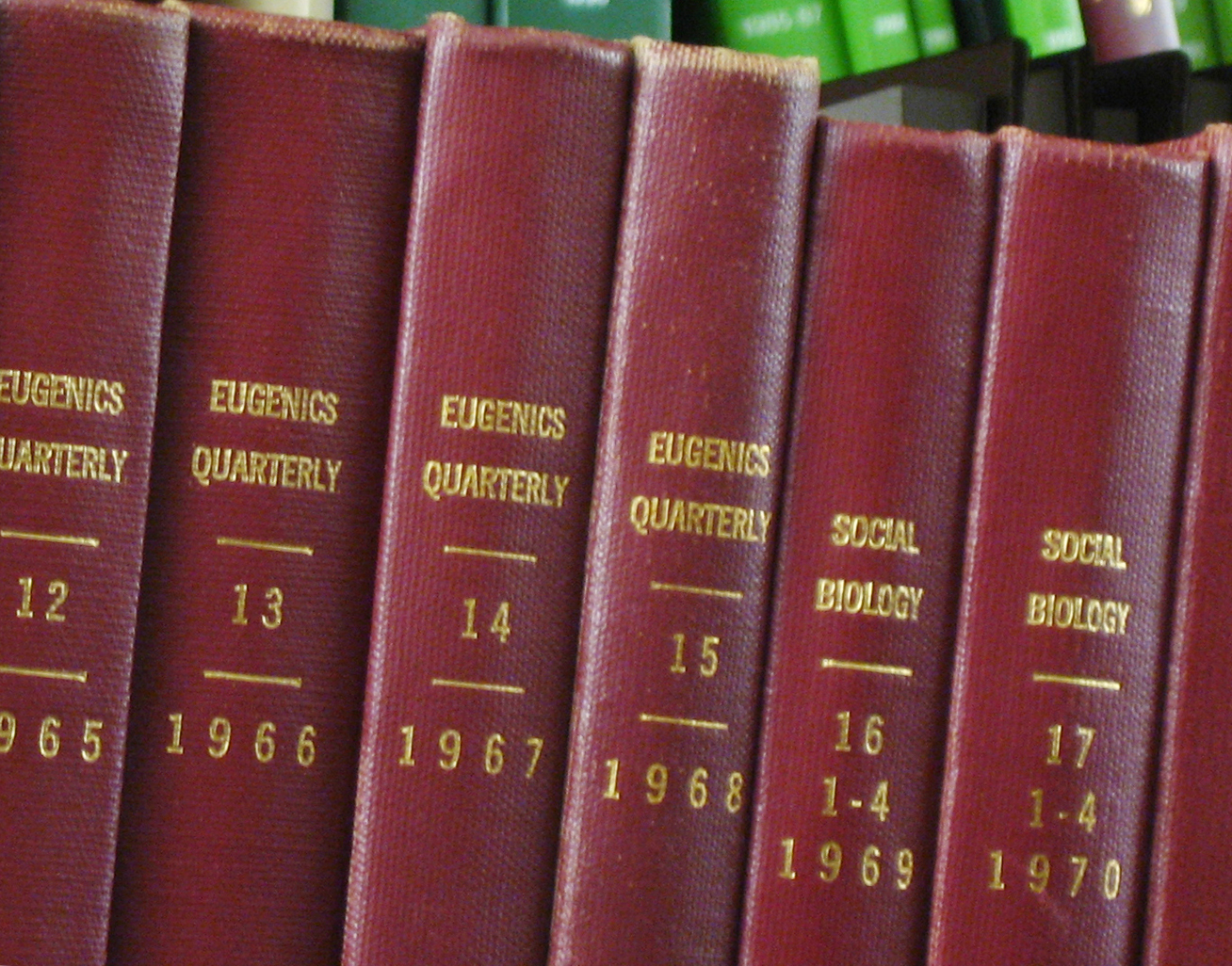
Eugenics Quarterly

During the postwar years, one of Osborn's lasting influences was shifting the emphasis of American eugenics to positive eugenics, which seeks to achieve eugenic goals through encouraging the spread of desired traits, as opposed to negative eugenics, which seeks to achieve eugenic goals through discouraging the spread of undesired traits.

Osborn was elected to the American Philosophical Society in 1948.

In 1954, Osborn played a central role in the founding of the journal Eugenics Quarterly, published by Duke University, which changed its name in 1968 to Social Biology.

In 1968 Osborn published The Future of Human Heredity: An Introduction to Eugenics in Modern Society, one of his most influential works. The esteemed geneticist Theodosius Dobzhansky, one of the most influential biologists of the time, wrote the foreword of Osborn's magnum opus, endorsing and heaping praise on him. Dobzhansky asserted that eugenics has a "sound core" and that humanity cannot escape the natural forces that govern it, writing that "The real problem which mankind will not be able to evade indefinitely is where the evolutionary process is taking man, and where man himself wishes to go." Dobzhansky commended Osborn for his role within the eugenics movement as a staunch advocate for his advocacy of empirical rigour in the study of eugenics and his pushback against what Dobzhansky called its "zealous proponents", who injected racial ideology into eugenics rather than being guided by scientific evidence. "Mr. Osborn has for several decades been the clear-sighted leader of the eugenical movement in America, who strove to make the substance of eugenics scientific and its name respectable again," Dobzhansky wrote.
