= EngenderHealth =

US non-profit organization

- Founded: 1937; 89 years ago
- Founder: Marian Stephenson Olden
- Type: Nonprofit organization IRS exemption status: 501(c)(3)
- Purpose: sexual and reproductive health, family planning, contraception, HIV and AIDS, gender equality.
- Location: Washington, D.C., United States
- Region served: United States, Africa, Asia
- Key people: Pamela W. Barnes; Hugh Moore
- Revenue: $58,420,745 (FY 2012)
- Employees: 500+
- Website: www.engenderhealth.org
- Formerly called: Sterilization League of New Jersey (1937–1943); Birthright, Inc. (1943–1950); Human Betterment Association of America (1950–1962); Human Betterment Association for Voluntary Sterilization (1962–1965); Association for Voluntary Sterilization (1965–1984); Association for Voluntary Surgical Contraception (1984–1994); Access to Voluntary and Safe Contraception International (1994–2001)

EngenderHealth is a 501(c)(3) nonprofit organization based in Washington, D.C., with a focus in sexual and reproductive health (SRH). The organization operates in nearly 20 countries throughout Africa, Asia, and North and South America.

The organization was established in 1943, providing access to voluntary surgical contraception in the United States during its first 25 years. It has since expanded its mission to "training health care professionals and partnering with governments and communities to make high-quality family planning as well as sexual and reproductive health services available today and for generations to come."

== History ==
In the course of its existence, EngenderHealth has undergone changes in name and mission, reflecting internal debate, shifts in public policy, and changes in public opinion and international awareness. The organization has been described as a prime example of how the modern US family planning movement was shaped by three overlapping but distinguishable social forces: the eugenics movement, the movement for (female) reproductive rights, and the population control movement.

=== 1937–1945: US eugenics movement ===
The organization was founded by Marian Olden in 1937 as the Sterilization League of New Jersey (SLNJ). Olden had taken an interest in eugenics in the 1930s and led a campaign within the League of Women Voters in 1935 to have New Jersey adopt eugenic sterilization legislation, as dozens of US states had already done. The failure of this campaign convinced Olden of the need for an organization dedicated specifically to eugenic sterilization. The Sterilization League was founded in Trenton, New Jersey in January 1937. The League had 23 founding members, and within the first year of its existence, grew to 373. The League's constitution stated its purpose as:

(1) To aid in the preparation, promotion, enactment and enforcement of legislative measures designed to provide for the improvement of the human stock by the selective sterilization of the mentally defective and of those afflicted with inherited or inheritable physical disease;

(2) To conduct educational activities designed to develop and sustain public opinion in support of the measures required to make effective the above purpose;

(3) To collect, compile and publish statistical, medical, economic and social data relative to the extent, causes and consequence of the mental and physical defects, which, when transmitted from one generation to another, impair the racial stock;

(4) To raise and administer funds for carrying out the purposes of the League.

In 1939, the Sterilization League of New Jersey led another effort to pass a sterilization law for New Jersey. The bill proposed by the League would have empowered a "state eugenicist" who could petition for the sterilization of state residents deemed unfit to reproduce to a newly established "State Eugenic Council". Such individuals would be sterilized, even against their objection, unless they launched a successful appeal to the council. Due to its compulsory nature, the bill was not supported by organizations which were generally supportive of sterilization, such as the League of Women Voters and the New Jersey Birth Control League. The bill ultimately died without being debated on the floor of the legislature.

In 1943, the Sterilization League of New Jersey expanded its scope from New Jersey to become a national organization, with the new name Birthright, Inc., chosen as an allusion to a 1930 speech given by president Herbert Hoover in which he promised that "there shall be no child in America that has not the complete birthright of a sound mind in a sound body, and that has not been born under proper conditions." The rebranding of the organization was intended to soften its image, and distance itself from eugenic themes, which were becoming unpopular due to their association with the eugenic program of Nazi Germany. Rather than improvement of the genetic stock, Birthright reframed its goal as protecting the country's children, and ensuring they were born and raised under proper conditions. Birthright described itself as promoting "all reliable and scientific means for improving the biological stock of the human race."

Marian Olden, the organization's founder, was a controversial figure in the organization, in part because of her abrasive, uncompromising personality, and her stubborn embrace of hardline eugenic ideas, even as these were becoming increasingly unpopular in the United States. Birthright's executive board ultimately voted to sever ties with Olden in June 1948.

In 1950, Birthright was renamed the Human Betterment Association of America (HBAA). In the same year, the Manhattan studio at the New York Academy of Medicine of Robert Latou Dickinson, who had been a member since 1943 and became the first chairman of the organization's medical and scientific committee in 1949, served as new headquarters.

=== 1945–1972: US birth control movement ===
After the Second World War, organizations and persons promoting eugenic sterilization were under pressure to change their advocacy. After 1950, the HBAA moved toward promoting voluntary sterilization. Throughout the 1950s and 1960s, the organization lobbied for legislation to legalize voluntary sterilization, provided funding to sterilization clinics, and covered the cost of sterilization for poor patients. Historian Rebecca M Kluchin characterizes this period as a shift from eugenics to "neo-eugenics", with the goal of encouraging voluntary sterilization for the "unfit" as a solution to social ills such as single motherhood, poverty, overpopulation, and criminality.

In 1962, the organization's name was changed to the Human Betterment Association for Voluntary Sterilization (HBAVS). Although the organization attracted a number of prominent scientists and activists, its influence soared in 1964 when Hugh Moore, the wealthy inventor of the Dixie Cup and noted supporter of population control, threw his influence and money behind the group. Apart from financial support, Moore served as president from 1964 to 1969. Under his presidency, in 1965, the HBAVS was renamed the Association for Voluntary Sterilization (AVS). In 1969, AVS funded the first vasectomy clinic in the United States.

In the early 1970s, AVS and its allies in the family planning movement launched an intensive campaign to promote sterilization. Concurrently, AVS launched—together with the ACLU and Zero Population Growth—"Operation Lawsuit": a series of successful lawsuits against various U.S. hospitals for refusing to comply with patients' requests for sterilization. These campaigns resulted in the increasingly widespread acceptance in the medical profession that sterilization was an effective birth control method, and that sterilization decision making was purely a matter between patients and their physicians. AVS also worked to establish the first informed consent and client-counselling components in health services and produced one of the first manuals on family planning counselling.

=== 1972–2001: International family planning ===
In the changing atmosphere of the late 1960s and early 1970s, when the importance of population control and family planning in the Third World for U.S. foreign policy was being stressed, AVS became in 1972 for the first time the recipient of funding from the U.S. Agency for International Development (USAID). In its subsequent international activities, AVS became instrumental in the widespread acceptance and utilization of surgical sterilization. It is in large part due to its pioneering work that this is the most prevalent method of contraception worldwide.

In the early 1970s, AVS supported the work of surgeons who were developing a new approach to tubal ligation (female surgical sterilization) called "minilaparotomy", or "minilap". Prior to minilap, surgery for female sterilization often required women to remain in the hospital for up to a week. Minilap, however, could be performed under local anaesthesia as an outpatient procedure, in basic health facilities without specialized equipment.

In the 1980s, AVS helped pioneer a new method of vasectomy called "no-scalpel vasectomy" (NSV), which had fewer complications and healed faster than traditional vasectomies, making it more attractive for men seeking sterilization. In 1985, AVS introduced the technique in the United States.

AVS was renamed the Association for Voluntary Surgical Contraception (AVSC) in 1984. The next year, the nonprofit published a landmark reference book, Voluntary Sterilization: An International Fact Book, a comprehensive source of information about contraceptive sterilization around the world. It included reviews of service delivery, usage trends, laws and policies, research gaps, and more. This was updated in 2002 as Contraceptive Sterilization: Global Issues and Trends.

AVSC launched an international postabortion care (PAC) program in 1993 to reduce injury and death among women who undergo unsafe abortions. Since then, the program has been introduced in more than 30 countries. (The organization has never provided abortions.)

The organization changed its name to Access to Voluntary and Safe Contraception International (AVSC International) in 1994. In 1995, AVSC published COPE: A Process and Tools for Quality Improvement in Family Planning and Other Reproductive Health Services, the first of its COPE methodology books. Developed through work in Kenya and Nigeria in the late 1980s, the name means "Client-Oriented, Provider-Efficient", and is a process "[to help] health care staff continuously improve the quality and efficiency of services provided at their facility and make services more responsive to clients' needs." Since then, the COPE methodology has been expanded to many other health services and adapted by many other organizations.

In 1996, AVSC also launched its Men As Partners (MAP) program, working with men to promote gender equality, reduce gender-based violence, and recognize their important roles in the health of their families and communities. Since then, MAP has worked in more than 15 countries in Africa, Asia, and the Americas.

Also in that year, AVSC introduced "facilitative supervision", an approach to quality improvement in health care service delivery. This methodology promotes "mentoring, joint problem solving, and two-way communication", and was formally described in the 2001 Facilitative Supervision Handbook.

With support from the Bill & Melinda Gates Foundation, AVSC partnered with four other international agencies in 1999 to launch the Alliance for Cervical Cancer Prevention (ACCP). Other partners include the International Agency for Research on Cancer (IARC), Jhpiego (an affiliate of the Johns Hopkins University), the Pan American Health Organization (PAHO), and the Program for Appropriate Technology in Health (PATH).

=== 2001–2008: EngenderHealth and women's health ===
To reflect its expansion beyond sterilization, in 2001 the organization changed its name to EngenderHealth, added the tagline "Improving Women's Health Worldwide", and introduced a new logo. It operates under this name today, although its logo and tagline changed in 2008.

In 2002, EngenderHealth was awarded the United Nations Population Award for institutions, noting its contribution to family planning and reproductive health care in resource-poor countries. In recognition of this honor, Mayor Michael Bloomberg declared July 1, 2002, as "EngenderHealth Day" in New York City, and presented a certificate to the organization. At the XVI International AIDS Conference in 2006, EngenderHealth was one of five finalists nominated for the Red Ribbon Award: Celebrating Community Leadership and Action on AIDS for its MAP work in South Africa to engage men in HIV and AIDS prevention and reducing gender-based violence.

With funding from the U.S. Agency for International Development (USAID), EngenderHealth became the managing partner of the large-scale ACQUIRE Project (which stood for "Access, Quality, and Use in Reproductive Health") in 2003. This global project worked in more than 20 countries around the world to improve family planning, maternal health, and post-abortion care services. Other partners in the project included the Adventist Development and Relief Agency International (ADRA), CARE, IntraHealth International, Inc. Meridian Group International, Inc., the Society for Women and AIDS in Africa, and SATELLIFE. As one of USAID's flagship projects in the field of family planning, the ACQUIRE Project developed new approaches to international family planning work that have since been adopted and extended by other USAID-funded projects.

Also in 2003, and also with funding from USAID, EngenderHealth became the managing partner of the AWARE-RH Project ("Action for West Africa Region -- Reproductive Health"), which worked with governments, donors, and private institutions to improve access to health services, lower the costs of health care, and strengthen existing medical institutions in 21 West African countries. Other partners in the project included Abt Associates, the Academy for Educational Development (AED), and Management Sciences for Health.

EngenderHealth's Men As Partners program continued to expand. EngenderHealth and Instituto Promundo founded the MenEngage Global Alliance, an international alliance to promote "research, advocacy, and interventions that encourage men and boys to increase gender equality." Today, MenEngage works around the world to raise awareness and support initiatives that reduce gender-based violence, with additional partnership from the World Health Organization (WHO), United Nations Development Programme (UNDP), United Nations Population Fund (UNFPA), Save the Children, International Center for Research on Women (ICRW), the White Ribbon Campaign, Sonke Gender Justice, and several other organizations.

In 2006, in partnership with the Population Council, Ipas, Marie Stopes International, Willows Foundation, and the Ministry of Health in Ghana to launch the R3M Program: Reducing Maternal Morbidity and Mortality. The project supported family planning and long-term and permanent contraceptives in Ghana.

=== 2008–present: EngenderHealth "For a Better Life" ===
In 2008, on its 65th anniversary, EngenderHealth launched a new logo, visual identity, and tagline: "for a better life." It operates under this brand today.

- The nonprofit became the managing partner of The Fistula Care Project, funded by USAID. At the time, it was the largest international project ever to focus on the treatment and prevention of obstetric fistula.
- The Maternal Health Task Force (MHTF) launched with funding from the Bill & Melinda Gates Foundation. In 2011, management of the MHTF moved on to the Harvard School of Public Health Women and Health Initiative to continue its next phase.
- The RESPOND Project launched with funding from USAID. Known as "Responding to the Need for Family Planning through Expanded Contraceptive Choices and Program Services" and works to "expand family planning services and improve reproductive health in developing countries."
- In partnership with Family Health International and the University of Illinois at Chicago, EngenderHealth launched the Male Circumcision Consortium. The Consortium works to "improve and expand access to voluntary medical circumcision services in Kenya as part of an overall strategy to reduce HIV infections in men."

In 2009, EngenderHealth announced two new projects with USAID funding. The first was the CHAMPION Project, a five-year project in Tanzania, working with men to improve "serious reproductive health challenges" in Tanzania, including HIV and AIDS. The CHAMPION Project also received funding from the President's Emergency Plan for AIDS Relief (PEPFAR). A second USAID-funded project worked to expand HIV prevention services for the most at-risk population in urban areas of Ethiopia.

EngenderHealth was one of several nonprofits mentioned in Half the Sky: Turning Oppression into Opportunity for Women Worldwide, a best-selling book written by Nicholas Kristof and Sheryl WuDunn and published in September 2009. In support of the book, EngenderHealth published an online Reader's Companion with additional stories and resources, and partnered with Equality Now and Ashoka to co-host Accelerating Equality for Women and Girls Around the World, a discussion panel featuring the authors.

== Areas of focus ==
- Family planning, including: contraception; informed consent; rights; long-acting reversible contraception; vasectomy and sterilization; prevention of teenage pregnancy.
- Maternal health, including: treatment and prevention of obstetric fistula; treatment and prevention of pre-eclampsia/eclampsia; treatment and prevention of postpartum hemorrhage; postabortion care; prevention of cervical cancer.
- HIV and AIDS, including: prevention and treatment; the prevention of mother-to-child transmission (PMTCT) of HIV; male circumcision as a way to reduce HIV transmission; the reduction of stigma and discrimination against HIV-positive individuals; integration of counseling/treatment services with other health services (particularly family planning services) .
- Gender equality, including: reducing gender-based violence; getting men more involved in family planning decisions.
- Quality improvement, including: training medical staff; improving efficiency within medical clinics; working with local and national leaders to improve availability of medical supplies.

== Affiliated persons ==
Leadership:

- 1937–1948 Marian Olden (secretary)
- 1945–1961 H. Curtis Wood Jr (president)
- 1961–1963 Ruth Proskauer Smith (executive director)
- 1963–1972 John Rague (executive director)
- 1964–1969 Hugh Moore (businessman), president
- 1972–1973 Charles T. Faneuff (executive director)
- 1973–1981 Ira Lubell (executive director)
- 1981–1990 Hugo Hoogenboom (executive director)
- 1990–2005 Amy Pollack (president)
- 2005–2010 Ana Langer (president)
- 2010–2016 Pamela W. Barnes (president)
- 2016–2017 Ulla E. Muller (president)
- 2017–2018 Rosemary Ellis (interim president)
- 2018–present Traci L. Baird (president/CEO)

Notable members:

- Isaac Asimov, author and professor of biochemistry.
- Paul Blanshard, American journalist.
- Abigail Van Buren, author of the "Dear Abby" syndicated personal advice column.
- Brock Chisholm, first director-general of the World Health Organization and honorary president to the AVS in the early 1960s.
- Francine Coeytaux, women's health advocate and public health specialist (Chair of Executive Committee).
- Mary Dent Crisp, co-chairwoman of the Republican National Committee.
- Robert Latou Dickinson, gynecologist and sex researcher.
- Brenda Jackson Drake, JD, director of the Public Health Trust.
- Paul R. Ehrlich, entomologist and author on the subject of human overpopulation.
- Millicent Fenwick, Republican U.S. Representative from New Jersey and United States Ambassador to the United Nations Agencies for Food and Agriculture.
- Joseph Fletcher, pioneer in the field of bioethics.
- Harry Emerson Fosdick, clergyman.
- Garrett Hardin, ecologist and microbiologist.
- Julio Frenk, Dean of the Harvard School of Public Health.
- Alan Frank Guttmacher, American physician.
- Edward P. Morgan, journalist and anchor of the ABC Evening News.
- John Rock, one of the inventors of the birth control pill.
- Nafis Sadik, MD, Special Advisor to the UN Secretary General and former head of the UNFPA.
- Margaret Sanger, birth control activist.
- Janice Hansen Zakin, MD, associate at NASA Ames Research Center.

== See also ==
- Americans for UNFPA
- Family Health International
- United States Agency for International Development (USAID)
- President's Emergency Plan for AIDS Relief (PEPFAR)
- International Planned Parenthood Federation
- Pathfinder International
- Birth control movement in the United States
- Human Betterment Foundation
