= Biodemography and Social Biology =

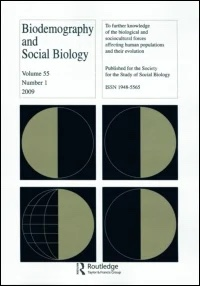
- Cover of Biodemography and Social Biology
- Discipline: Biology, Sociology, Demography
- Language: English
- Edited by: Hiroaki Matsuura

Publication details
- Former names: Eugenical News; Eugenics Quarterly; Social Biology
- History: 1916–present
- Publisher: Routledge
- Frequency: Semiannual
- Impact factor: 0.9 (2023)

Standard abbreviations
- ISO 4: Biodemogr. Soc. Biol.

Indexing
- ISSN: 1948-5565 (print); 1948-5573 (web)
- LCCN: 2009202712
- OCLC no.: 309845773

Links
- Journal homepage; Online access; Online archive

Biodemography and Social Biology is a semiannual peer-reviewed academic journal covering the intersection between biology, demography, and sociology. The journal is devoted to "furthering the discussion, advancement, and dissemination of knowledge about biological and sociocultural forces interacting to affect the structure, health, well-being and behavior of human populations". The journal aims to contribute to the fields of both sociobiology and biodemography. It was established in 1916 and is published by Routledge on behalf of the Society for Biodemography and Social Biology, of which it is the official journal. The editor-in-chief is Hiroaki Matsuura (Shoin University). According to the Journal Citation Reports, the journal has a 2023 impact factor of 0.9.

== History ==
Biodemography and Social Biology was first established in 1916 as Eugenical News. It was published under that title until 1953. It was renamed Eugenics Quarterly in 1954, when it was launched by the American Eugenics Society as a scholarly journal focused on eugenics and related subjects. It was renamed Social Biology in 1969, as a result of the term "eugenics" falling out of fashion. It was renamed again to its current title in 2008 and continues to publish as an independent journal after the disbandment of the Society for Biodemography and Social Biology in 2019.

== Notable studies ==
- Henry, Louis. (1961). “Some data on natural fertility,” Eugenics Quarterly 8(2): 81–91.
- Rogers, Richard G. and Robert Hackenberg. (1987). Extending epidemiologic transition theory: A new stage. Social Biology 34(3-4): 234-243.

== Past editors ==
- Frederick Osborn (Various affiliations), Chairman (1954-1968)
- Dudley Kirk (Stanford University), Chairman (1968)
- Richard H. Osborne (University of Wisconsin–Madison), Editor (1961-1977)
- Arthur Falek (Emory University), Editor (1977-1980)
- Richard H. Osborne (University of Wisconsin–Madison), Editor (1981-1999)
- Kenneth Land (Duke University), Editor (1999-2008)
- Tim B. Heaton (Brigham Young University) / Ken R. Smith (University of Utah), Editor (2008-2012)
- Eileen M. Crimmins (University of Southern California), Editor (2013-2021)
