= Ana Langer =

Argentine-born physician, public health researcher

- Langer in 2010
- Born: Argentina
- Education: National University of Buenos Aires
- Scientific career
- Workplaces: EngenderHealth; Harvard T.H. Chan School of Public Health

Ana Langer is an Argentine-born physician and public health researcher who is a professor at the Harvard T.H. Chan School of Public Health. Her work focuses on women's health, reproductive health, maternal health and health systems. She led the Harvard T.H. Chan School of Public Health Women and Health Initiative, which examines the need and role of women in health systems. She was the lead author of the 2015 Lancet Commission on Women and Health, which examined the health needs of women and their contributions as providers of health care.

== Early life and education ==
Langer was born in Argentina. Her parents were Austrian physicians who left Austria before World War II. Their commitment to working with disadvantaged communities motivated Langer to study medicine. She studied medicine in Buenos Aires during the political violence and repression of the Dirty War. As a medical student, she worked to provide health services in low-income communities. After qualifying as a physician, Langer began a paediatric residency, and eventually left Argentina for Mexico. She continued her training in paediatrics and subsequently specialised in neonatology at the National Institute of Perinatology. Her experience in neonatology led to a growing interest in the relationship between maternal and newborn health, women's reproductive health and public health.

== Career ==
Langer moved from clinical medicine into public health after joining a group of advisers working with the Mexican Ministry of Health. She served as Chair of the Department of Research in Women and Children's Health at the Mexican National Institute of Public Health, where she studied reproductive health and worked with the World Health Organization to create a master's programme in Reproductive Health. In 1994, she became Regional Director for Latin America and the Caribbean at the Population Council, where she investigated the impact of emergency contraception on Mexico's public health system.

In 2005, Langer was made President and CEO of EngenderHealth. In 2010, Langer joined the Harvard T.H. Chan School of Public Health, where she led the Women and Health Initiative and the Maternal Health Task Force. The Maternal Health Task Force supports research and knowledge sharing within the global maternal health community, including Ethiopia, India and Tanzania.

Langer studies maternal health, reproductive health, gender and the organisation of health systems. A recurring theme of her work is the dual role of women as both major users of health services and major providers of health and care. She was the lead author of the Lancet Commission on Women and Health, which argued for a broader understanding of women's relationship with health systems. The commission considered women's health throughout the life course as well as women's contributions to healthcare, including paid and unpaid work.

Langer focused on maternal and reproductive health during COVID-19, including through the multinational InterCovid study. The project examines how COVID-19 affects pregnancy, maternal health, and foetal and neonatal outcomes to provide robust evidence for families, clinicians and policymakers.

== Selected publications ==
- Suellen Miller; Edgardo Abalos; Monica Chamillard; et al. (2016). "Beyond too little, too late and too much, too soon: a pathway towards evidence-based, respectful maternity care worldwide". The Lancet. 388 (10056): 2176–2192. doi:10.1016/s0140-6736(16)31472-6. PMID 27642019. Wikidata Q30393091.
- Paul Farmer; Julio Frenk; Felicia M Knaul; et al. (2010). "Expansion of cancer care and control in countries of low and middle income: a call to action". The Lancet. 376 (9747): 1186–1193. doi:10.1016/s0140-6736(10)61152-x. PMID 20709386. Wikidata Q37779973.
