= Roswell Hill Johnson =

American eugenicist and sociologist (1877–1967)

Roswell Hill Johnson (1877–1967) was an American eugenics professor in the early twentieth century. Born in Buffalo, New York in 1877 and educated at Brown University, Harvard, and the University of Chicago and University of Wisconsin–Madison, Johnson conducted research at the Anatomical Laboratory of the University of Wisconsin and at the Carnegie Institution's Station for Experimental Evolution. He joined the Carnegie staff in July 1905 as an assistant to Charles Davenport, the nation's most influential eugenicist in the first quarter of the twentieth century. Johnson's early work involved ladybugs, whose short life cycle made them ideal for studying evolution. He also developed techniques for locating underground petroleum reserves.

== Career in Pittsburgh ==
Johnson began teaching at the University of Pittsburgh in 1912 as an instructor in biology and assistant professor of oil and gas mining. In 1918 he co-wrote Applied Eugenics with Paul Popenoe; edited by Richard T. Ely, it became a popular college textbook. He created the university's eugenics program, building it to thirty-five students by 1929. His eugenics classes at Pitt moved from the biology department to the zoology department, before landing ultimately in the sociology department in the late 1920s.

Johnson attempted to counter the demographic effects of mass immigration by encouraging greater reproduction rates from native-born men and women of relative affluence. His plans relied upon acceptance of inherent inequality, which drove him to negative measures. Johnson viewed government-funded birth control, incarceration, sterilization, and restricted marriage licensing as rational devices. He developed his views amid the expansion of both nativism and social scientific investigation in the United States during the 1910s and 1920s. He co-authored the prominent Applied Eugenics with Paul Popenoe in 1918.

== Career after Pittsburgh ==
After receiving a doctorate in sociology from the University of Pittsburgh in 1934, he announced in the American Journal of Sociology that he would thereafter teach solely in the field of sociology. He left Pitt in 1935 to teach eugenics and social hygiene as a part-time instructor at the University of Hawaii. He also served as the staff social hygienist for the Palama Settlement, a Honolulu medical and social work institution.

By the end of the 1930s, he lived in Los Angeles and served as the director of personal service for Popenoe's American Institute of Family Relations. The Institute preached the benefits of medical testing and stressed disciplined study as the best way for single men and women to prepare for marriage. Johnson's work for the AIFR brought his thinking about reproduction full circle. In his 1948 book Looking Toward Marriage, he summarized decades of experience in counseling singles. Traits such as stability, sympathy, "self-mastery," intelligence, and health produced the best chances for a successful marriage, he noted. Singles had to be realistic about their chances of finding a partner and honest to prospective partners about their aspirations and limitations.

== See also ==
- Taylor–Johnson Temperament Analysis
