= Human Betterment Foundation =

US eugenics organization

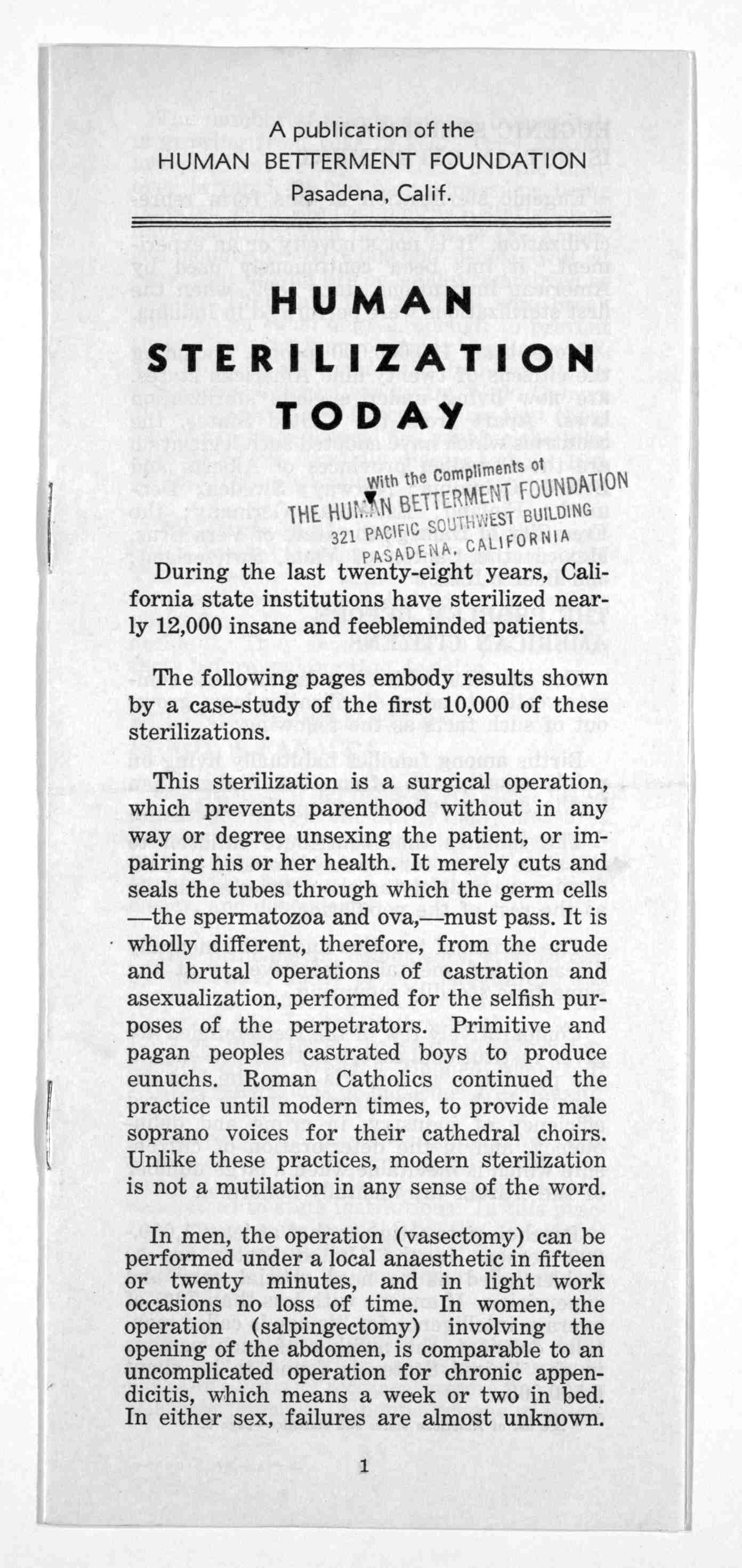
1938 HBF pamphlet titled "Human Sterilization Today"

The Human Betterment Foundation (HBF) was an American eugenics organization established in Pasadena, California in 1928 by E. S. Gosney and Rufus B. von KleinSmid, President of the University of Southern California, with the aim "to foster and aid constructive and educational forces for the protection and betterment of the human family in body, mind, character, and citizenship". It primarily served to compile and distribute information about compulsory sterilization legislation in the United States, for the purposes of eugenics.

The initial board of trustees were Gosney, Henry Mauris Robinson (a Los Angeles banker); George Dock (a Pasadena physician); Charles Goethe (a Sacramento philanthropist); Justin Miller (dean of the college of law at the University of Southern California); Otis Castle (a Los Angeles attorney); Joe G. Crick (a Pasadena horticulturist); and biologist/eugenicist Paul Popenoe. Later members included Lewis Terman (a Stanford psychologist best known for creating the Stanford-Binet test of IQ); Robert Andrews Millikan (Chair of the Executive Council of Caltech); William B. Munro (a Harvard professor of political science); and University of California, Berkeley professors Herbert M. Evans (anatomy) and Samuel J. Holmes (zoology).

After Gosney's death in 1942, Gosney's daughter Lois Castle and the HBF's board liquidated HBF. Its funds were transferred in 1943 to the newly founded Gosney Research Fund at Caltech. The archives of the Human Betterment Foundation are stored at Caltech.

== Later public disavowal ==
On account of Millikan's affiliation with the Human Betterment Foundation, in January 2021, the Caltech Board of Trustees authorized removal of Millikan's and Gosney's names (and the names of four other historical figures affiliated with the Foundation), from campus buildings that had been associated with their other achievements. In June 2020, the University of Southern California similarly removed the name of von KleinSmid from campus buildings on account of his association with eugenics; he had served as President there for more than 25 years.

== See also ==
- American Eugenics Society
- British Eugenics Society
- EngenderHealth
- Eugenics in California
- Eugenics in the United States
- Race Betterment Foundation
- Society for Biodemography and Social Biology
