= Hans-Peter Kohler =

German-American demographer

- Education: Kempten University of Applied Sciences; University of California, Berkeley
- Awards: Clifford C. Clogg Award for Early Career Achievement by the Population Association of America (2005)
- Scientific career
- Fields: Demography
- Workplaces: University of Pennsylvania
- Thesis: Fertility and social interaction: An economic approach (1997)
- Doctoral advisor: Ronald D. Lee

Hans-Peter Kohler is a German-American demographer and sociologist. He is the Frederick J. Warren Professor of Demography, Professor of Sociology, and co-director of the Population Aging Research Center at the University of Pennsylvania.

In 2005, he received the Clifford C. Clogg Award for Early Career Achievement from the Population Association of America, and in 2018, the Association named him an honored member. He previously served as a fellow at the Centre for Advanced Study at the Norwegian Academy of Science and Letters from 2006 to 2007 and as president of the Society for Biodemography and Social Biology from 2007 to 2012. In 2012, he and the three other authors (Jennifer Johnson-Hanks, Christine Bachrach, and Phil Morgan) received the Otis Dudley Duncan Award for Outstanding Scholarship in Social Demography from the American Sociological Association for their 2011 book Understanding Family Change and Variation: Toward a Theory of Conjunctural Action.
