= Jason Boardman =

American sociologist

Jason D. Boardman
- Born: Jason David Boardman
- Education: University of California, Berkeley; University of Texas at Austin
- Spouse: Alison
- Children: 2
- Awards: Population Association of America Early Achievement Award (2012)
- Scientific career
- Fields: Demography; Sociology
- Institutions: University of Colorado Boulder
- Thesis: The social determinants of health: Race, resources, and neighborhoods in the Detroit tri-county area (2002)
- Doctoral advisors: Christopher G. Ellison; Robert A. Hummer

Jason David Boardman is a professor of sociology at the University of Colorado Boulder, where he directs the Health and Society Program at the Institute of Behavioral Science. He is known for his research on the genetics of educational attainment.
