= Michael Teitelbaum =

American demographer (born 1944)

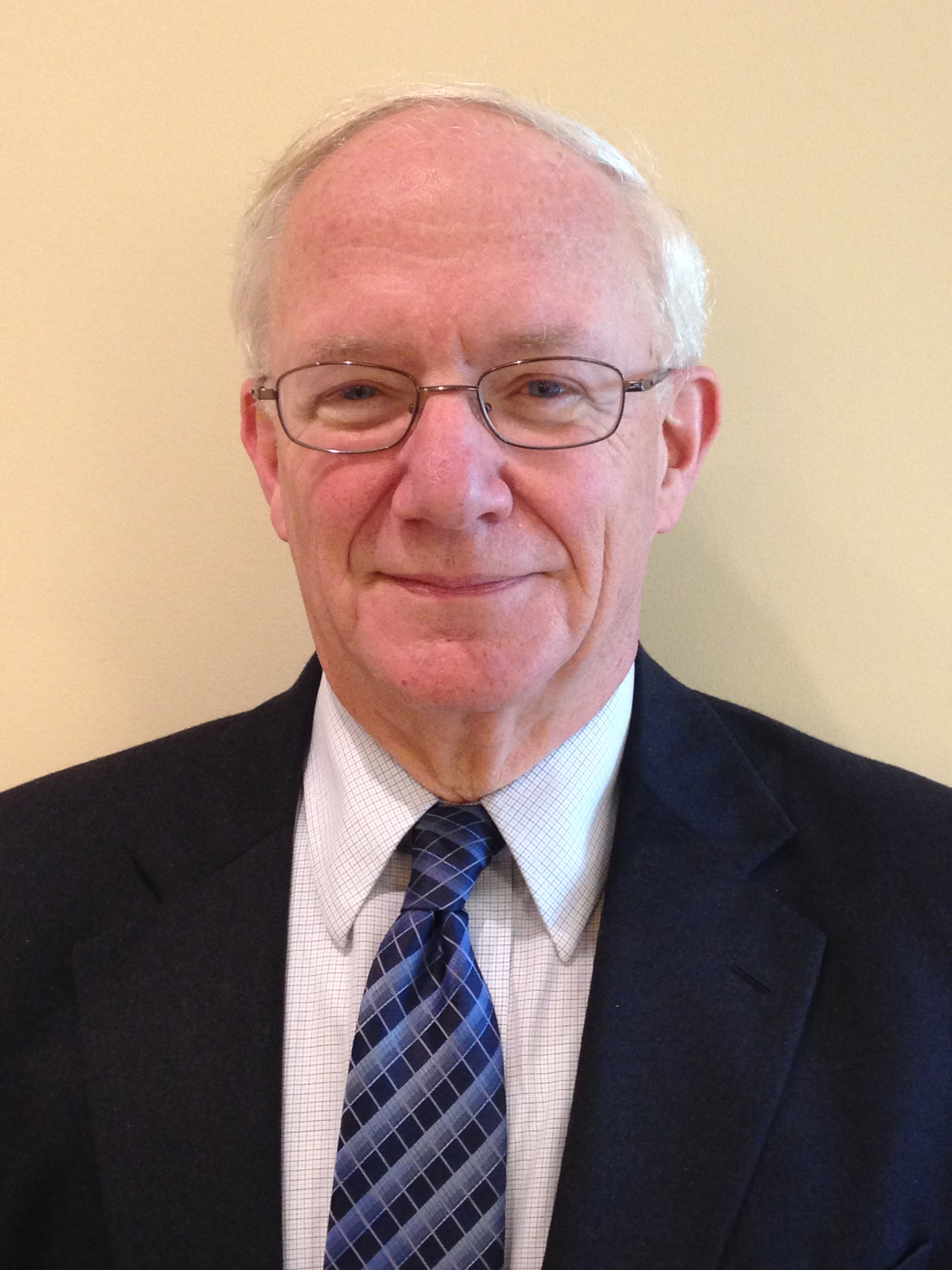
- Born: Michael S. Teitelbaum; January 21, 1944 (age 82)
- Education: Reed College; Oxford University

Michael S. Teitelbaum (born January 21, 1944) is a demographer and the former Vice President of the Alfred P. Sloan Foundation in New York City. He is Senior Research Associate at the Labor and Worklife Program, Harvard Law School.

He publishes in both the popular and academic press on demographic trends, especially fertility and international migration and their causes and consequences. In the 1970s he was Staff Director of the Select Committee on Population in the U.S. House of Representatives, and in the 1980s he served as Commissioner to the U.S. Commission for the Study of International Migration and Cooperative Economic Development. From 1990-1997 he was Vice Chair and Acting Chair of the U.S. Commission on Immigration Reform often known as the Jordan Commission after its late Chair Barbara Jordan.

Teitelbaum was an undergraduate student at Reed College and later a Rhodes Scholar at Oxford University, where he earned his DPhil in demography in 1970. Between 1969 and 1973, he was an assistant professor and research associate in the Office of Population Research at Princeton University. From 1974 to 1978, he served as University Lecturer in Demography and Faculty Fellow at Nuffield College, Oxford University. Teitelbaum also worked as a program officer for the Ford Foundation in 1973-1974 and 1980-1981. He joined the Alfred P. Sloan Foundation as a program director and became Vice President of this institution in 2007. In 2013, ScienceCareers from the journal Science named him Person of the Year for his "dedicated, imaginative, and surpassingly effective work on behalf of early-career scientists."

== Ideas and scholarship ==
In The Fear of Population Decline (1985), Teitelbaum and his co-author Jay M. Winter provide a cross-national discussion of political and cultural anxieties about low fertility, highlighted by British and French military defeats and the tendency of political leaders to regard sagging population growth as an obstacle to national renewal. Great Britain's Royal Commission on Population in 1949 asserted that "the failure of a society to reproduce itself indicates something wrong in its attitude to life, which is likely to involve other forms of decadence."

Teitelbaum and Winter have been critical of works such as Philip Longman's The Empty Cradle: How Falling Birthrates Threaten World Prosperity and What to Do About It (New York: Basic Books, 2004) that express alarms about the prospects for world civilization if procreation does not have an upsurge in the twenty-first century. In the New York Times (April 6, 2014), Teitelbaum and Winter warned against the "dark prophecies" about population decline, noting that such concerns have a long history of exaggeration that persist to this day. A century ago Theodore Roosevelt thundered against Anglo-Saxon "race suicide," while Depression-era fertility declines led to books such as The Twilight of Parenthood: A Biological Study of the Decline of Population Growth (1934) by the socialist feminist Enid Charles. After the low fertility rates of the Great Depression were supplanted by the baby boom of the postwar period, environmentalists and left-leaning observers began to forecast mass starvation on the assumption that food production could not keep pace with high population growth rates in the developing world [works such as Paul Erlich's The Population Bomb (1968)].

In making his case for pro-natalist policies in the prestigious journal Foreign Affairs (September/October 2004), Longman has criticized Teitelbaum for focusing a historical lens on the problem of population decline: "The matter cannot be settled by pointing to history, because no previous society has experienced aging on the scale and at the speed of that now occurring throughout the world…. Countries such as China are now aging as much in one generation as France did over the course of centuries."

As a foundation executive, Teitelbaum played a significant role in nurturing a network of scholars and policy experts on the economics of science and engineering. He observed that passionate debates about feared "shortages" of US scientists and engineers were being conducted without rigorous data and information. Thus, he helped support the formation of the Science and Engineering Workforce Project based at the National Bureau of Economic Research and led by Harvard labor economist Richard B. Freeman. Teitelbaum also realized that universities and scientific research institutes were vastly expanding the hiring of postdocs often for long periods but with little likelihood of a career path in research. He initiated a Sloan Foundation grants program to improve data collection and analysis about postdocs, and provided start-up support for the National Postdoctoral Association (NPA), founded in 2003 and now based in Washington, D.C.

== Selected bibliography ==
- Falling Behind? Boom, Bust & the Global Race for Scientific Talent (Princeton University Press, 2014)
- The Global Spread of Fertility Decline: Population, Fear, and Uncertainty (Yale University Press, 2013, co-authored with Jay Winter)
- Political Demography, Demographic Engineering (Berghahn Books, 2001, co-authored with Myron Weiner)
- A Question of Numbers: High Migration, Low Fertility, and the Politics of National Identity (Hill and Wang, 1998, co-authored with Jay Winter)
- Threatened Peoples, Threatened Borders (W.W. Norton, 1995, co-editor);
- Population and Resources in Western Intellectual Traditions (Cambridge University Press, 1989, co-editor);
- The Fear of Population Decline (Academic Books, 1985, co-authored with Jay M. Winter);
- Latin Migration North: The Problem for U.S. Foreign Policy (Council on Foreign Relations, 1985);
- The British Fertility Decline: Demographic Transition in the Crucible of the Industrial Revolution (Princeton University Press, 1984).
- Martin Luther King Jr, J'ai fait un rêve (co-written with Lewis Helfand 2014)
