= Samuel Jackson Holmes =

American zoologist and geneticist (1868–1964)

Samuel Jackson Holmes (March 7, 1868 – March 5, 1964) was an American zoologist and eugenicist. He was a professor at the University of California, Berkeley from 1912 to 1938. He was a genetics researcher who studied animal behavior, heredity, and evolution. Over the course of his career he migrated from studying animals to humans, taking the behaviors and traits learned in the former and looking for them in the latter.

== Education and career ==
Holmes attended Chaffey College in Ontario, California, and obtained his Bachelor of Science (1893) and Master of Science (1895) from the University of California, Berkeley. His biological research at Berkeley earned him a fellowship to the University of Chicago in 1895, where he received his Ph.D in 1897.

After teaching at San Diego High School for the academic year 1897–1898, between 1898 and 1906 he was an instructor of zoology at the University of Michigan. From there he moved to the Stevens Point Normal School (University of Wisconsin–Stevens Point), 1906 to 1912. In 1912, he returned to Berkeley as an associate professor, and then in 1916 was promoted to full professor. At Berkeley, his teaching and research focused on experimental morphogenesis, genetics, animal behavior, and eugenics. He was named faculty research lecturer in 1929. He retired in 1939 but continued on as professor emeritus until his death in 1964.

=== Zoology ===
Holmes' initial research focused on animals and animal behavior. His proximity to the California coast allowed him to research the species of crustacea that reside there. In 1900, he published his book titled Synopsis of California Stalk-Eyed Crustacea. In 1906, he published the Biology of the Frog where he wrote "It indeed seems, as is often remarked, that the frog is especially designed as a subject for biological research."

=== Eugenics ===
In 1909, during his tenure at Berkeley, Holmes taught a course titled The Factors of the Evolution of Man. After leaving Berkeley, Holmes served as president of The Society for Biodemography and Social Biology, formerly known as the American Eugenics Society, from 1938–1940.

Holmes was a vocal proponent of eugenics, particularly in reference to immigration to the United States from Mexico and parts of Asia. In 1925, at a major conference on race relations along the Pacific Coast at Stanford University, Holmes told an audience of social scientists and public officials that, "the Mexican problem is by far the greatest race problem which confronts the people of California at the present time. .. We are in a considerable amount of trouble before we see the amicable adjustment of the whole Mexican situation. The Mexican problem urgently needs to be studied very thoroughly." His later work advocated for the sterilization of citizens and immigrants who might diminish the genetic quality of America. He was one of the original incorporators of the Human Betterment Foundation.

In his book Life and Morals, Holmes claimed that morals had a natural origin but, Darwinian evolution "does not logically compel me to adopt any one standard of conduct rather than another." His last book titled, The Ethics of Enmity, was never published.

== Family ==
He was born in Henry, Illinois to Avis Folger (née Taber) and Joseph Holmes. He moved to California with his family at the age of 15.

Holmes married Celia Warfield Skinner (November 14, 1882 – March 12, 1958), daughter of Minerva Celia (née Shreve) and Henry E. Skinner, on September 21, 1909, in Berkeley. She was a student at the University of California, Berkeley and graduated with the class of 1905.

They had five children:

- Samuel Jackson Holmes, Jr. — (February 23, 1912 – November 27, 1973)
- Marion Virginia Holmes — (later Wagner; August 7, 1913 – April 27, 2000)
- Avis Celia Holmes — (later Olsen; September 20, 1914 – September 20, 1999)
- John Warfield Holmes — (March 19, 1920 – November 23, 1996)
- Joseph Edward Holmes — (June 25, 1926 – July 28, 1995)

Samuel Holmes died at Kaiser Hospital in Oakland at the age of 95.

Their oldest daughter, Dr. Marion Holmes Wagner, became an obstetrician and gynecologist and delivered over 10,000 babies in the San Jose-South Bay area.

Their grandson, Joseph Edward Holmes, Jr., is a landscape photographer in Kensington, California.

== Bibliography ==
Holmes contributed numerous articles to scientific periodicals and journals, and was the author of several books that included:

- 1900: Synopsis of California Stalk-Eyed Crustacea. — (California Academy of Sciences).
- 1906: Biology of the Frog. — (MacMillan).
- 1911: Evolution of Animal Intelligence. — (H. Holt and Company).
- 1916: Studies in Animal Behavior. — (R.G. Badger).
- 1919: Elements of Animal Biology. — (P. Blakiston's Son & Co.).
- 1921: The Trend of the Race. — (Harcourt, Brace).
- 1921: Louis Pasteur. — (Harcourt, Brace and company).
- 1923: Studies in Evolution and Eugenics. — (Harcourt, Brace and Co.).
- 1924: A Bibliography of Eugenics. University of California Press.
- 1924: Louis Pasteur. — (Harcourt, Brace).
- 1926: Life and Evolution: An Introduction to General Biology. — (Harcourt, Brace and Company).
- 1933: The Eugenic Predicament. — (Harcourt, Brace).
- 1936: Human Genetics and Its Social Import. — (McGraw-Hill).
- 1937: The Negros' Struggle For Survival. — (University Of California Press).
- 1948: Life and Morals. — (Macmillan).

== See also ==
- Eugenics in the United States

== Research resources ==
- Guide to the Samuel J. Holmes Papers. at The Bancroft Library.
