= List of members of the National Academy of Sciences (social and political sciences) =

This list is a subsection of the List of members of the National Academy of Sciences, which includes more than 7,000 members and international members of the United States National Academy of Sciences, both living and deceased, each affiliated with one of 31 disciplinary sections. Members are listed under their primary section, and each person's name, primary institution, and election year are given. For deceased members, the year of death is noted.

== Social and political sciences ==
Name	Institution	Year
Richard Alba (died 2025)	CUNY Graduate Center	2020
John Aldrich	Duke University	2024
Gabriel Almond (died 2002)	Stanford University	1977
Luc Anselin	University of Chicago	2008
Robert Axelrod	University of Michigan	1986
William O. Aydelotte (died 1996)	University of Iowa	1974
Larry Bartels	Vanderbilt University	2012
Robert H. Bates	Harvard University	2015
Janeen H. Baxter	University of Queensland	2024
Peter Bearman	Columbia University	2014
Hubert M. Blalock Jr. (died 1991)	University of Washington	1976
Peter Blau (died 2002)	University of North Carolina at Chapel Hill	1980
Lawrence Bobo	Harvard University	2004
Allan Bogue (died 2016)	University of Wisconsin–Madison	1985
John Bongaarts	Population Council	2002
Kenneth E. Boulding (died 1993)	University of Colorado Boulder	1975
William Brass (died 1999)	London School of Hygiene & Tropical Medicine	1984
Larry Bumpass	University of Wisconsin–Madison	2001
Angus Campbell (died 1980)	University of Michigan	1980
Donald T. Campbell (died 1996)	Lehigh University	1973
Andrew Cherlin	Johns Hopkins University	2016
Nicholas Christakis	Yale University	2024
Ansley J. Coale (died 2002)	Princeton University	1973
James Coleman (died 1995)	University of Chicago	1972
Dalton Conley	Princeton University	2018
Philip Converse (died 2014)	University of Michigan	1973
Karen Cook	Stanford University	2007
Gary W. Cox	Stanford University	2005
Eileen M. Crimmins	University of Southern California	2016
Robert A. Dahl (died 2014)	Yale University	1972
Ralf Dahrendorf (died 2009)	London School of Economics	1977
Kingsley Davis (died 1997)	Stanford University	1966
Karl Deutsch (died 1992)	Harvard University	1976
Paul DiMaggio	New York University	2022
Greg Duncan	University of California, Irvine	2010
Otis D. Duncan (died 2004)	University of California, Santa Barbara	1973
Jorge Durand	University of Guadalajara	2004
Richard Easterlin (died 2024)	University of Southern California	2002
Kathryn Edin	Princeton University	2014
Shmuel N. Eisenstadt (died 2010)	The Hebrew University of Jerusalem	1982
Paula England	New York University Abu Dhabi	2018
James Fearon	Stanford University	2012
Richard Fenno (died 2020)	University of Rochester	1983
John Ferejohn	New York University	1988
Morris Fiorina	Stanford University	1998
Ronald Freedman (died 2007)	University of Michigan	1974
Noreen Goldman	Princeton University	2024
Leo Goodman (died 2020)	University of California, Berkeley	1974
Mark Granovetter	Stanford University	2020
Robert Groves	Georgetown University	2011
David B. Grusky	Stanford University	2025
Emmanuel Gyimah-Boadi	Afrobarometer	2019
John L. Hagan	Northwestern University	2017
Kathleen Harris	University of North Carolina at Chapel Hill	2014
Philip M. Hauser (died 1994)	The University of Chicago	1976
Robert M. Hauser	University of Wisconsin–Madison	1984
Albert O. Hirschman (died 2012)	Institute for Advanced Study	1987
George C. Homans (died 1989)	Harvard University	1972
James House	University of Michigan	2007
Michael Hout	New York University	2003
Vincent Hutchings	University of Michigan	2022
Alex Inkeles (died 2010)	Stanford University	1981
Kathleen Hall Jamieson	University of Pennsylvania	2020
Christopher Jencks (died 2025)	Harvard University	1997
Robert Jervis (died 2021)	Columbia University	2021
Arne L. Kalleberg	University of North Carolina at Chapel Hill	2024
Robert Keohane	Princeton University	2005
Ronald C. Kessler	Harvard University	2008
Nathan Keyfitz (died 2010)	Harvard University	1997
Donald Kinder	University of Michigan	2017
Gary King	Harvard University	2010
Desmond King	University of Oxford	2025
Thomas Kuhn (died 1996)	Massachusetts Institute of Technology	1979
David D. Laitin	Stanford University	2007
Ronald Lee	University of California, Berkeley	1992
Ron Lesthaeghe	Free University of Brussels	2014
Margaret Levi	Stanford University	2015
Stanley Lieberson (died 2018)	Harvard University	1992
Seymour Martin Lipset (died 2006)	Stanford University	1973
James G. March (died 2018)	Stanford University	1973
Robert D. Mare (died 2021)	University of California, Los Angeles	2010
Douglas Massey	Princeton University	1998
David R. Mayhew	Yale University	2013
Cheikh S. Mbacké	Université de Thiès	2018
Richard McKelvey (died 2002)	California Institute of Technology	1993
Sara McLanahan (died 2021)	Princeton University	2011
David Mechanic	Rutgers, The State University of New Jersey, New Brunswick	1991
Jane Menken	University of Colorado at Boulder	1989
Robert K. Merton (died 2003)	Columbia University	1968
Helen Milner	Princeton University	2019
Robert A. Moffitt	Johns Hopkins University	2019
Susan Murphy	Harvard University	2016
Diana Mutz	University of Pennsylvania	2021
Ernest Nagel (died 1978)	Columbia University	1985
Daniel S. Nagin	Carnegie Mellon University	2025
Joseph Needham (died 1995)	East Asian History of Science Library	1978
Theodore Newcomb (died 1984)	University of Michigan	1974
Johan Olsen	University of Oslo	2011
Scott E. Page	University of Michigan	2025
Bernice A. Pescosolido	Indiana University	2021
Alejandro Portes	University of Miami	2000
Samuel H. Preston	University of Pennsylvania	1987
Adam Przeworski	New York University	2021
Robert D. Putnam	Harvard University	2001
Willard V. Quine (died 2000)	Harvard University	1977
Adrian Raftery	University of Washington	2009
Jean-Aime Rakotoarisoa	University of Antananarivo	2006
Stephen Raudenbush	University of Chicago	2012
Barbara Reskin	University of Washington	2006
Cecilia L.L. Ridgeway	Stanford University	2025
William H. Riker (died 1993)	University of Rochester	1993
Matilda White Riley (died 2004)	Bowdoin College	1994
Luis Rosero-Bixby	University of California, Berkeley	2013
Robert Sampson	Harvard University	2006
Gary Segura	University of California, Los Angeles	2023
William H. Sewell (died 2001)	University of Wisconsin–Madison	1976
Kenneth Shepsle	Harvard University	1990
Beth A. Simmons	University of Pennsylvania	2013
Burton Singer (died 2026)	Princeton University	1994
Theda Skocpol	Harvard University	2008
Brian Skyrms	University of California, Irvine	1999
Mario Luis Small	Columbia University	2022
Neil Smelser (died 2017)	University of California, Berkeley	1993
Susan Stokes	University of Chicago	2022
Charles Tilly (died 2008)	Columbia University	1981
Jan Tinbergen (died 1994)	Erasmus University Rotterdam	1974
Florencia Torche	Princeton University	2020
James Vaupel (died 2022)	Max Planck Institute for Demographic Research	2004
Sidney Verba (died 2019)	Harvard University	1983
Kenneth Wachter	University of California, Berkeley	1999
Barbara F. Walter	University of California, San Diego	2023
Mary C. Waters	Harvard University	2010
Duncan J. Watts	University of Pennsylvania	2023
Barry Weingast	Stanford University	2011
Bruce Western	Russell Sage Foundation	2015
Harrison White (died 2024)	Columbia University	1975
David R. Williams	Harvard University	2019
Robin Murphy Williams (died 2006)	University of California, Irvine	1982
William Julius Wilson	Harvard University	1991
Yu Xie	Princeton University	2009
Min Zhou	University of California, Los Angeles	2023
