= Fertility =

Natural capability to produce offspring

Fertility in colloquial terms refers the ability to have offspring. In demographic contexts, fertility refers to the actual production of offspring, rather than the physical capability to reproduce, which is termed fecundity. The fertility rate is the average number of children born during an individual's lifetime. In medicine, fertility refers to the ability to have children, and infertility refers to difficulty in reproducing naturally. In general, infertility or subfertility in humans is defined as not being able to conceive a child after one year (or longer) of unprotected sex. The antithesis of fertility is infertility, while the antithesis of fecundity is sterility.

== Demography ==
In demographic contexts, fertility refers to the actual production of offspring, rather than the physical capability to produce which is termed fecundity. While fertility can be measured, fecundity cannot be. Demographers measure the fertility rate in a variety of ways, which can be broadly broken into "period" measures and "cohort" measures. "Period" measures refer to a cross-section of the population in one year. "Cohort" data on the other hand, follows the same people over a period of decades. Both period and cohort measures are widely used.

=== Period measures ===
- Crude birth rate (CBR) - the number of live births in a given year per 1,000 people alive at the middle of that year. One disadvantage of this indicator is that it is influenced by the age structure of the population.
- General fertility rate (GFR) - the number of births in a year divided by the number of women aged 15–44, times 1000. It focuses on the potential mothers only, and takes the age distribution into account.
- Child-Woman Ratio (CWR) - the ratio of the number of children under 5 to the number of women 15–49, times 1000. It is especially useful in historical data as it does not require counting births. This measure is actually a hybrid, because it involves deaths as well as births. (That is, because of infant mortality some of the births are not included; and because of adult mortality, some of the women who gave birth are not counted either.)

=== Cohort measures ===
Countries by fertility rate as of 2020

- Total fertility rate (TFR) - the total number of children a woman would bear during her lifetime if she were to experience the prevailing age-specific fertility rates of women. TFR equals the sum for all age groups of 5 times each ASFR rate.
- Gross Reproduction Rate (GRR) - the number of girl babies a synthetic cohort will have. It assumes that all of the baby girls will grow up and live to at least age 50.
- Net Reproduction Rate (NRR) - the NRR starts with the GRR and adds the realistic assumption that some of the women will die before age 49; therefore they will not be alive to bear some of the potential babies that were counted in the GRR. NRR is always lower than GRR, but in countries where mortality is very low, almost all the baby girls grow up to be potential mothers, and the NRR is practically the same as GRR. In countries with high mortality, NRR can be as low as 70% of GRR. When NRR = 1.0, each generation of 1000 baby girls grows up and gives birth to exactly 1000 girls. When NRR is less than one, each generation is smaller than the previous one. When NRR is greater than 1 each generation is larger than the one before. NRR is a measure of the long-term future potential for growth, but it usually is different from the current population growth rate.

=== Social and economic determinants of fertility ===
A parent's number of children strongly correlates with the number of children that each person in the next generation will eventually have. Factors generally associated with increased fertility include religiosity, intention to have children, and maternal support. Factors generally associated with decreased fertility include wealth, education, female labor participation, urban residence, cost of housing, intelligence, increased female age and (to a lesser degree) increased male age.

The "Three-step Analysis" of the fertility process was introduced by Kingsley Davis and Judith Blake in 1956 and makes use of three proximate determinants: The economic analysis of fertility is part of household economics, a field that has grown out of the New Home Economics. Influential economic analyses of fertility include Becker (1960), Mincer (1963), and Easterlin (1969). The latter developed the Easterlin hypothesis to account for the Baby Boom.

=== Bongaarts' model of components of fertility ===
Bongaarts proposed a model where the total fertility rate of a population can be calculated from four proximate determinants and the total fecundity (TF). The index of marriage (Cm), the index of contraception (Cc), the index of induced abortion (Ca) and the index of postpartum infecundability (Ci). These indices range from 0 to 1. The higher the index, the higher it will make the TFR, for example a population where there are no induced abortions would have a Ca of 1, but a country where everybody used infallible contraception would have a Cc of 0.

TFR = TF × Cm × Ci × Ca × Cc

These four indices can also be used to calculate the total marital fertility (TMFR) and the total natural fertility (TN).

TFR = TMFR × Cm

TMFR = TN × Cc × Ca

TN = TF × Ci

Intercourse
The first step is sexual intercourse, and an examination of the average age at first intercourse, the average frequency outside marriage, and the average frequency inside.
Conception
Certain physical conditions may make it impossible for a woman to conceive. This is called "involuntary infecundity." If the woman has a condition making it possible, but unlikely to conceive, this is termed "subfecundity." Venereal diseases (especially gonorrhea, syphilis, and chlamydia) are common causes. Nutrition is a factor as well: women with less than 20% body fat may be subfecund, a factor of concern for athletes and people susceptible to anorexia. Demographer Ruth Frisch has argued that "It takes 50,000 calories to make a baby". There is also subfecundity in the weeks following childbirth, and this can be prolonged for a year or more through breastfeeding. A furious political debate raged in the 1980s over the ethics of baby food companies marketing infant formula in developing countries. A large industry has developed to deal with subfecundity in women and men. An equally large industry has emerged to provide contraceptive devices designed to prevent conception. Their effectiveness in use varies. On average, 85% of married couples using no contraception will have a pregnancy in one year. The rate drops to the 20% range when using withdrawal, vaginal sponges, or spermicides. (This assumes the partners never forget to use the contraceptive.) The rate drops to only 2 or 3% when using the pill or an IUD, and drops to near 0% for implants and 0% for tubal ligation (sterilization) of the woman, or a vasectomy for the man.
Gestation
After a fetus is conceived, it may or may not survive to birth. "Involuntary fetal mortality" involves natural abortion, miscarriages and stillbirth (a fetus born dead). Human intervention intentionally causing abortion of the fetus is called "therapeutic abortion".

== In medicine ==
In medicine, the definition of fertility is "the capacity to establish a clinical pregnancy."

Women have hormonal cycles which determine when they can achieve pregnancy. The cycle is approximately twenty-eight days long, with a fertile period of five days per cycle, but can deviate greatly from this norm. Men are fertile continuously, but their sperm quality is affected by their health, frequency of ejaculation, and environmental factors.

Fertility declines with age in both sexes. For women, the decline begins around the age of 32, and becomes precipitous at age 37. For men, potency and sperm quality begins to decline around the age of 40. Even if an older couple does manage to conceive a child, the pregnancy will be increasingly difficult for the mother, and carries a higher risk of birth defects and genetic disorders for the child.

Pregnancy rates for sexual intercourse are highest when it occurs every 1 or 2 days, or every 2 or 3 days. Studies have found no significant difference between different sex positions and pregnancy rate, as long as it results in ejaculation into the vagina.

=== Menstrual cycle ===
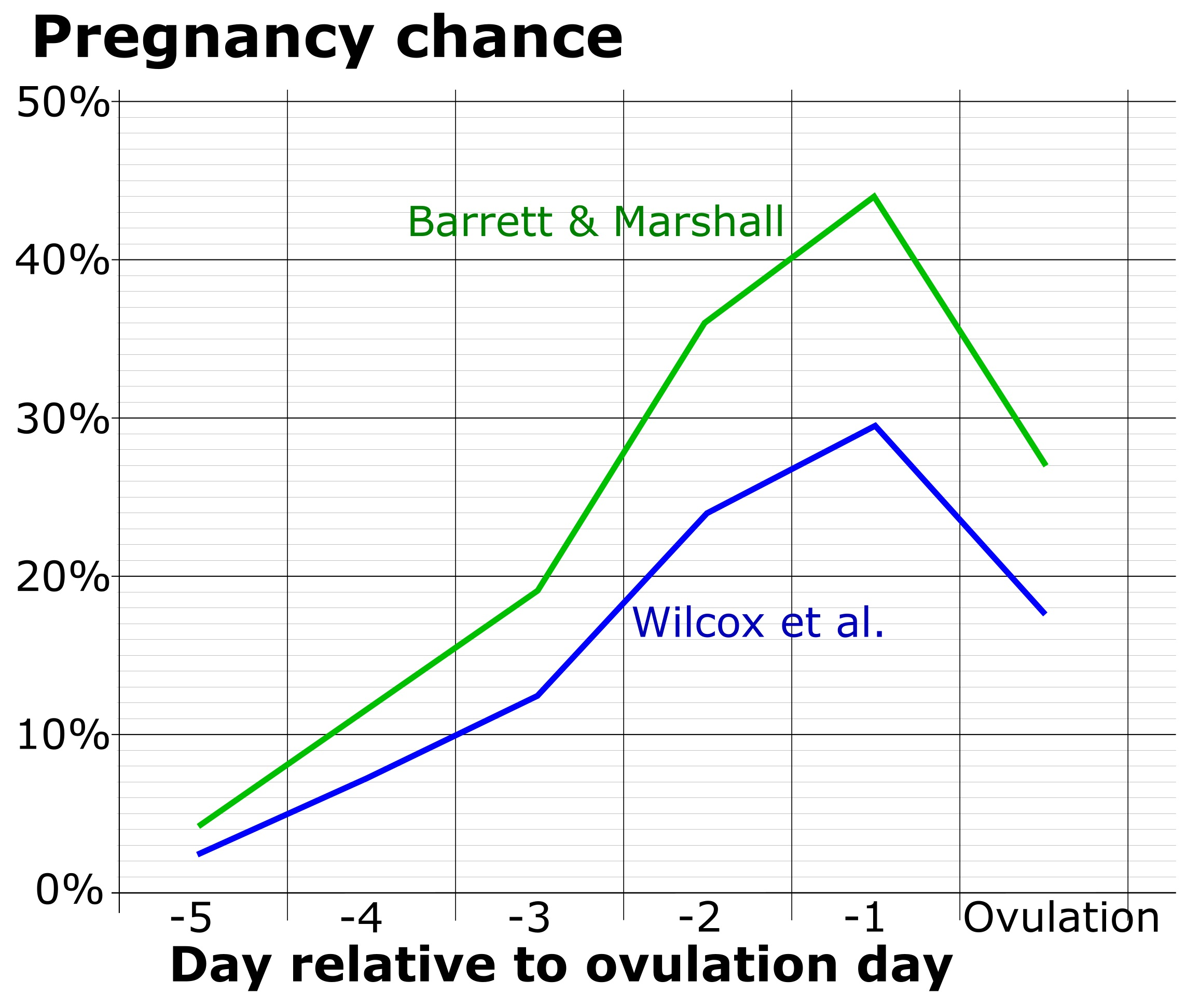
Chance of fertilization by menstrual cycle day relative to ovulation

A woman's menstrual cycle begins, as arbitrarily assigned, with menses. Next is the follicular phase where estrogen levels build as an ovum matures (due to the follicular stimulating hormone, or FSH) within the ovary. When estrogen levels peak, it spurs a surge of luteinizing hormone (LH) which completes maturation and enables the ovum to break through the ovary wall. This is ovulation. During the luteal phase following ovulation LH and FSH cause the post-ovulation ovary to develop into the corpus luteum which produces progesterone. The production of progesterone inhibits the LH and FSH hormones which (in a cycle without pregnancy) causes the corpus luteum to atrophy, and menses to begin the cycle again.

Peak fertility occurs during just a few days of the cycle: usually two days before and two days after the ovulation date. This fertile window varies from woman to woman, just as the ovulation date often varies from cycle to cycle for the same woman. The ovule is usually capable of being fertilized for up to 48 hours after it is released from the ovary. Sperm survive inside the uterus between 48 and 72 hours on average, with the maximum being 120 hours (5 days).

These periods and intervals are important factors for couples using the rhythm method of contraception.

=== Female fertility ===
The average age of menarche in the United States is about 12.5 years. In postmenarchal girls, about 80% of the cycles are anovulatory (ovulation does not actually take place) in the first year after menarche, 50% in the third and 10% in the sixth year.

Menopause occurs during a woman's midlife between ages 48 and 55. During menopause, hormonal production by the ovaries is reduced, eventually causing a permanent cessation of the creation of the uterine lining (period). This is considered the end of the fertile phase of a woman's life.

The predicted effect of age on female fertility in women trying to get pregnant, without using fertility drugs or in vitro fertilization:

- At age 30
  - 75% will conceive ending in a live birth within one year
  - 91% will conceive ending in a live birth within four years.
- At age 35
  - 66% will conceive ending in a live birth within one year
  - 84% will conceive ending in a live birth within four years.
- At age 40
  - 44% will conceive ending in a live birth within one year
  - 64% will conceive ending in a live birth within four years.

Studies of couples trying to conceive have yielded better results: one 2004 study of 770 European women found that 82% of 35- to 39-year-old women conceived within a year, while a study in 2013 of 2,820 Danish women saw 78% of 35- to 40-year-olds conceive within a year.

According to an opinion by the Practice Committee of the American Society for Reproductive Medicine, specific coital timing or position, and resting supine after intercourse have no significant impact on fertility. Sperm can be found in the cervical canal seconds after ejaculation, regardless of coital position.

Successful pregnancies facilitated by fertility treatment have been documented in women as old as 67.

=== Male fertility ===
Some research suggests that older males have decreased semen volume, sperm motility, and impaired sperm morphology. In studies that controlled for female partner's age, comparisons between men under 30 and men over 50 found relative decreases in pregnancy rates between 23% and 38%. Sperm count declines with age, with men aged 50–80 years producing sperm at an average rate of 75% compared with men aged 20–50 years and larger differences exist in the number of seminiferous tubules in the testes containing mature sperm:

- In males 20–39 years old, 90% of the seminiferous tubules contain mature sperm.
- In males 40–69 years old, 50% of the seminiferous tubules contain mature sperm.
- In males 80 years old and older, 10% of the seminiferous tubules contain mature sperm.

Decline in male fertility is influenced by many factors, including lifestyle, environment and psychological factors.

Some research suggests increased risks for health problems for children of older fathers, but no clear association has been proven. A large scale study in Israel suggested that the children of men 40 or older were 5.75 times more likely than children of men under 30 to have an autism spectrum disorder, controlling for year of birth, socioeconomic status, and maternal age. Increased paternal age has been suggested to correlate with schizophrenia but it is unproven.

Australian researchers have found evidence to suggest obesity may cause subtle damage to sperm and prevent a healthy pregnancy. They reported fertilization was 40% less successful when the father was overweight.

The American Fertility Society recommends an age limit for sperm donors of 50 years or less, and many fertility clinics in the United Kingdom will not accept donations from men over 40 or 45 years of age.

== Historical trends by country ==
=== France ===
The French pronatalist movement from 1919 to 1945 failed to convince French couples they had a patriotic duty to help increase their country's birthrate. Even the government was reluctant to support the movement. Only between 1938 and 1939 did the French government become directly and permanently involved in the pronatalist effort. Although the birthrate started to surge in late 1941, the trend was not sustained. Falling birthrate again became a major concern among demographers and government officials in the 1970s. In mid-2018, there was a bill introduced to legalize single women and lesbian couples to get fertility treatment. At the beginning of 2020, the Senate approved the bill 160 votes to 116. They are a step closer to legalizing fertility treatments for all women regardless of sexual orientation or marital status. Soon there will be no reason for lesbian couples or single women to travel to be able to start their own family.

=== Korea ===
Total fertility rate in Korea

South Korea has the lowest fertility rate in the world at 0.78. A variety of explanations have been proposed, ranging from investment in education to birth control, abortion, a decline in the marriage rate, divorce, female participation in the labor force, and the 1997 Asian financial crisis. After being legal from the 1960s to the 1980s, abortion was again made illegal in South Korea in the early 2000s in an attempt to reverse the declining fertility rate.

=== United States ===
United States crude birth rate (births per 1000 population); Baby Boom years in red.

From 1800 to 1940, fertility fell in the US. There was a marked decline in fertility in the early 1900s, associated with improved contraceptives, greater access to contraceptives and sexuality information and the "first" sexual revolution in the 1920s.

==== Post-WWII ====
After 1940 fertility suddenly started going up again, reaching a new peak in 1957. After 1960, fertility started declining rapidly. In the Baby Boom years (1946–1964), women married earlier and had their babies sooner; the number of children born to mothers after age 35 did not increase.

==== Sexual revolution ====
After 1960, new methods of contraception became available, the ideal family size fell, from 3 to 2 children. Couples postponed marriage and first births, and they sharply reduced the number of third and fourth births.

== See also ==
- Anti-natalism
- Birth control
- Family economics
- Family planning
- Fecundity
- Fertility clinic
- Fertility tourism
- Fertility deity
- Fertility preservation
- Human Fertilisation and Embryology Authority
- Natalism
- Natural fertility
- Oncofertility
- Reproductive health
- Sub-replacement fertility
- Total fertility rate
- Vasectomy
- Fertility-development controversy
- Fertility factor (demography)
  - Income and fertility
  - Fertility and intelligence
