= United Nations world population conferences =

International conference on population

Since the establishment of the United Nations (UN) in 1945, three official international conferences on population have been held (in 1974, 1984 and 1994), and two other conferences on population have been convened (in 1954 and 1965). This followed the first ever World Population Conference was in Geneva from 29 August to 3 September 1927, organized by the League of Nations and Margaret Sanger.

== List ==
- Bucharest World Population Conference, 19–30 August 1974, Bucharest, Romania; the first International Conference on Population organized at the intergovernmental level by the United Nations, attended by more than 1,400 delegates from 136 countries (from a total of 138 UN member states at the time);
- International Conference on Population and Development, 5–13 September 1994, Cairo, Egypt; the third International Conference on Population under the auspices of the UN, attended by 179 governmental delegations from UN member states, seven observers at governmental level, the European Union, and several hundred NGOs.
- International Conference on Population, 6–14 August 1984, Mexico City, Mexico; the second International Conference on Population, attended by representatives of 147 member states (from a total of 157 UN member states at the time);
- World Population Conference, Belgrade, 30 August – 10 September 1965, Belgrade, Yugoslavia; expert-level conference organized by the International Union for the Scientific Study of Population (IUSSP) and the UN;
- World Population Conference, Rome, 31 August – 10 September 1954, Rome, Italy; academic conference organized by the UN;

From 30 June to 2 July 1999, the Twenty-first session of the United Nations General Assembly in New York was dedicated to population and development.

== See also ==
- Commission on Population and Development
- List of population concern organizations
- United Nations Population Fund (UNFPA)
