= World Population Conference =

International conference in Switzerland

The first ever World Population Conference was held at the Salle Centrale, Geneva, Switzerland, from 29 August to 3 September 1927. Organized by the forerunner of the United Nations, the League of Nations, and Margaret Sanger; the conference was an attempt to bring together international experts on population, food supply, fertility, migration and health to discuss the problem of human overpopulation. The conference was organized with funds donated by Sanger's husband, J. Noah Slee, as well as a grant from the Rockefeller Foundation. Sir. Bernard Mallet presided over the meeting, and William H. Welch was vice-president.

The conference was attended by delegates from all over the world, promoted the study of human population and led to the establishment of the International Union for the Scientific Study of Population.

Since the United Nations officially came into existence in 1945, five subsequent conferences on population have been held.

== Event ==
The conference was truly international, with one hundred and twenty-three delegates from Argentina, Austria, Belgium, Brazil, Chile, China, Czechoslovakia, Denmark, Estonia, Finland, France, Germany, Great Britain, Greece, the Netherlands, India, Italy, Japan, Norway, Peru, Poland, Siam, Spain, the Soviet Union, Sweden, Switzerland, and the United States. The conference included six sessions dealing with several aspects of the population topic. Each session included papers followed by open discussions on topics including biology and population growth, food and population, differential fertility, the psychology of falling birth rates, international migration and migration restriction, heredity, and disease. The Conference included papers such as Raymond Pearl's "Biology of Population Growth" and Edward M. East's "Food and Population".

== Results ==
The World Population Conference succeeded in drawing attention to the study of population growth and established the International Union for the Scientific Study of Population. British Malthusian leader Charles Vickery Drysdale noted that the meeting was "devoid of propagandism," and that the "weight of authority at it has surpassed all the previous gatherings, and has been second to none in brilliance. The simple fact that nearly two hundred persons of the highest eminence in biological, economic and statistical science, sociologists, statesmen, and physicians have come from all parts of the world to Geneva to confer on this question is sufficient to show that it cannot be disregarded and that it will have to be considered by the Governments of all countries."

== Margaret Sanger's role ==
Margaret Sanger is thought to be the founder of the birth control movement in the United States. She conceived the World Population Conference and organized a group of scientists including Raymond Pearl, Edward Murray East, and Clarence Cook Little, to develop the program and invite speakers. She agreed that birth control would not be discussed in order to gain broad-based support abroad. She established an office to administer the conference in Geneva, but just before the Conference was to open, Sir Bernard Mallet removed her name and the names of her all-female administrative staff from the printed conference programs, stating that administrators and clerical staff should not be listed in a scientific program. Sanger's staff quit in protest; however she was able to persuade most back, arguing that the meeting was more important than who was credited, and agreed that the program be printed without mention of the women's names (including her own). Sanger edited the Proceedings of the World Population Conference.

== Subsequent World Population Conferences ==
The first World Population Conference sponsored by the United Nations was held in 1954 in Rome, a second in 1965 in Belgrade, a third in 1974 in Bucharest, a fourth in 1984 in Mexico City. The fifth World Population Conference to be sponsored by the United Nations was held in 1994 in Cairo.
