= John Bongaarts =

Dutch-American demographer

John P. M. Bongaarts (born 1945) is a Dutch-American demographer. He serves as Vice-President and Distinguished Scholar at the Population Council, where he has worked since the 1970s. Bongaarts has performed research in a diverse set of topics, such as population growth and aging, mortality, population-environment links and demography related to the epidemiology of HIV/AIDS. His most recognized work lies in the field of fertility, and has been a topic of interest throughout his career.

== Career ==
Bongaarts was born in Tegelen, the Netherlands, in 1945. He obtained a degree in electrical engineering from Eindhoven University of Technology in 1968. Bongaarts subsequently moved to the United States where he studied physiology and biomedical engineering at the University of Illinois and obtained his PhD in 1972, with a dissertation titled: "A Cybernetic Model of the Demographic Transition". He subsequently was a postdoctoral fellow at Johns Hopkins University.

He started working as associate for the Center for Population Studies of the Population Council in 1973. By 1982 he had become senior associate. In 1988 he became deputy director. The next year he was promoted to vice president of the policy research division. Since 2007 he also serves as distinguished scholar.

== Research ==
Bongaarts has performed research a broad variety of topics, such as: population ageing, fertility, population policy options, life expectancy. During the 1980s and 1990s he did research on the epidemiology of HIV/AIDS.

Research of Bongaarts on worldwide and smaller scale birth patterns has taken into account his statistical research on malnutrition, the availability and access to birth control and abortion, malnutrition and the duration of breastfeeding. In 1994 Bongaarts published the article "Population Policy Options in the Developing World" in Science. The article examined three causes of population growth: unwanted fertility, high desired family size, and population momentum. The article subsequently provided policy. It is considered to be one of the most influential articles in demography.

Bongaarts has designed an influential model on the fertility rate of a society, consisting of four main points: the proportion of married women, the proportion of women unable to bear children, the proportion of women using anticonceptives, and the abortion rate. In an article in Nature in February 2016, Bongaarts showed projections of world population growth by 2100 and argued for worldwide spread of quality contraception and family planning within ten years to slow down population growth. He furthermore argued for commitment to family planning at national and international level. He has seen the possibility of the latter increase since the 1994 International Conference on Population and Development.

== Honors and distinctions ==
He was elected a corresponding member of the Royal Netherlands Academy of Arts and Sciences in 1986. He was elected a member of the United States National Academy of Sciences in 2002. In 2013 he was selected as International Union for the Scientific Study of Population laureate. In his nomination letter for the laureate Samuel H. Preston wrote: "I can think of no one who has contributed more to the battery of methods used to study population processes."
