= Sub-replacement fertility =

Problem in demographic economics

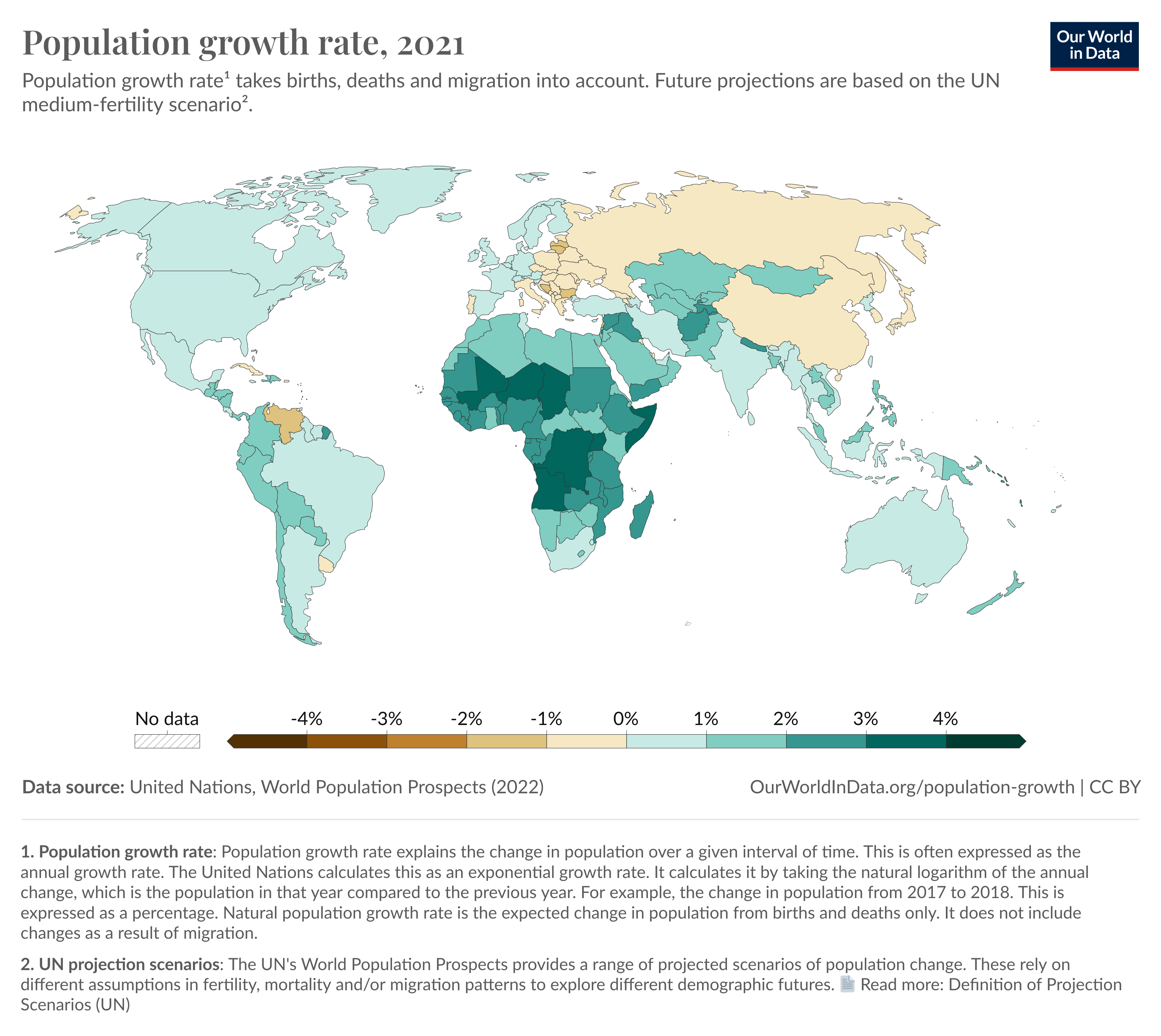
Global rates of population growth and decline (2021–2022); population growth rate takes birth, death, and migration rates into account. Future projections are based on the United Nations World Population Prospects (from 1950 until 2100).

Map of countries by total fertility rate (2022–2023), referring to the average number of children that are born to a woman over her lifetime, according to the Population Reference Bureau.

Sub-replacement fertility is a total fertility rate (TFR) that (if sustained) leads to each new generation being less populous than the older, previous one in a given area. The United Nations Population Division defines sub-replacement fertility as any rate below approximately 2.2 children born per woman of childbearing age, but the threshold can be as high as 3.4 in some developing countries because of higher mortality rates. Taken globally, the total fertility rate at replacement was 2.33 children per woman in 2003. This can be "translated" as 2 children per woman to replace the parents, plus a "third of a child" to make up for the higher probability of males born and mortality prior to the end of a person's fertile life. (Note: For example, in the United Kingdom in 2001, 304,635 boys were born as opposed to 290,000 girls, and some of these girls do not survive to the end of their child-bearing years. In future, therefore, the girls born in this year would have to have more than two children each to replace the total population. For a full explanation see Smallwood, Steve; Chamberlain, Jessica (Spring 2005). "Replacement Fertility, What has it been and What does it mean?" (PDF). Population Trends. 119: 16–27. Archived from the original (PDF) on 5 January 2016.) In 2024, the global average fertility rate was around 2.2 children born per woman.

Replacement-level fertility in terms of the net reproduction rate (NRR) is exactly one, because the NRR takes both mortality rates and sex ratios at birth into account. As of 2010, about 48% (3.3 billion people) of the world population lives in nations with sub-replacement fertility. Nonetheless, most of these countries still have growing populations due to immigration, population momentum and increased life expectancy. This includes most nations of Europe, Canada, Australia, Brazil, Russia, Iran, China, India, the United States and many others. In 2024, all European Union countries had a sub-replacement fertility rate, ranging from a low of 1.0 in Poland and Lithuania and 1.1 in Latvia, Estonia and Spain, to a high of 1.5 in Slovenia, Croatia, Denmark and Ireland, 1.6 in France and 1.7 in Bulgaria.

The countries or areas that have the lowest fertility are in developed parts of East and Southeast Asia: Singapore, China and South Korea. Only a few countries have had, for the time being, sufficiently sustained sub-replacement fertility (sometimes combined with other population factors like higher emigration than immigration) to have population decline, which are South Korea, China, Japan, Germany, Lithuania, Latvia, Estonia, Poland, Finland, Romania, Bulgaria and Ukraine. As of 2024, the total fertility rate varied from 0.72 in South Korea and 0.84 (2025) in China to 6.0 in Chad, Somalia, Central African Republic and the Democratic Republic of the Congo.

== History ==
Timeline of First Recorded Year of Sub-Replacement Fertility by Country (TFR < 2.1)
| 1915 | France |
| 1916 | Germany |
1917–1926
| 1927 | United Kingdom |
| 1928 | Sweden |
| 1929 | Switzerland |
1930
| 1931 | Czech Republic, Norway |
1932
| 1933 | Belgium, Austria |
1934–1955
| 1956 | Luxembourg |
| 1957 | Japan, Serbia |
1958–1959
| 1960 | Hungary |
1961
| 1962 | Romania |
| 1963 | Croatia, Ukraine |
1964
| 1965 | Bulgaria |
1966
| 1967 | Russia, Finland, Denmark |
1968–1971
| 1972 | United States, Canada |
| 1973 | Netherlands |
1974
| 1975 | Singapore |
| 1976 | Australia |
| 1977 | Italy |
| 1978 | Belarus, New Zealand, Lithuania |
1979–1980
| 1981 | Spain |
| 1982 | Greece, Portugal |
| 1983 | South Korea |
| 1984 | Taiwan |
1985–1988
| 1989 | Poland , Slovakia, (Republic of Ireland) Ireland |

The Greek historian Polybius largely blamed the decline of the Hellenistic world on low fertility rates, writing in his work The Histories that:

In our time all Greece was visited by a dearth of children and generally a decay of population, owing to which the cities were denuded of inhabitants, and a failure of productiveness resulted, though there were no long-continued wars or serious pestilences among us.... For this evil grew upon us rapidly, and without attracting attention, by our men becoming perverted to a passion for show and money and the pleasures of an idle life, and accordingly either not marrying at all, or, if they did marry, refusing to rear the children that were born, or at most one or two out of a great number, for the sake of leaving them well off or bringing them up in extravagant luxury.

In a speech to Roman nobles, the Emperor Augustus commented on the low birthrates of the Roman elite:

We liberate slaves chiefly for the purpose of making out of them as many citizens as possible. We give our allies a share in the government that our numbers may increase; yet you, Romans of the original stock, including Quintii, Valerii, Iulii, are eager that your families and names at once shall perish with you.

Upon the establishment of the Roman Empire, Emperor Augustus would introduce legislation to increase the birthrates of the Roman nobility.

Some believe that not only the Great Recession, but the Great Depression, may have been the result of a decline in birthrates overall. Clarence L. Barber, an economist at the University of Manitoba, pointed out how demand for housing in the US, for example, began to decline in 1926, due to a decline in 'household formation' (marriage), due, he believed, to the effects of World War I upon society. In early 1929, US housing demand declined precipitously and the stock market crash followed in October of that same year.

== Causes ==
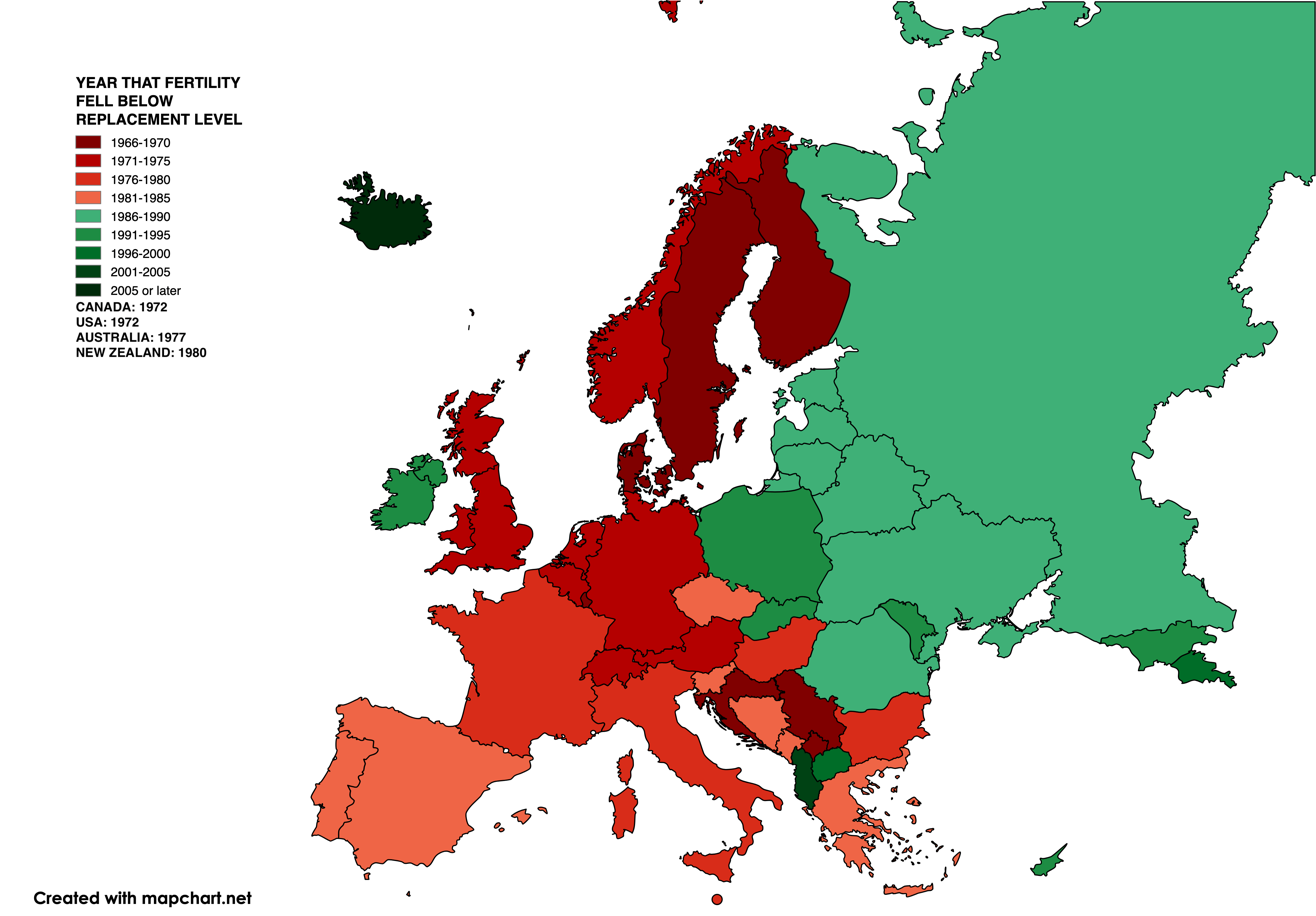
A map of when European fertility rates fell below replacement levels

Map of countries by crude birth rate

=== Higher education ===
Americans with a bachelor's degree or higher by state according to the U.S. Census Bureau's American Community Survey in 2019

The fact that more people are going to colleges and universities, and are working to obtain more post-graduate degrees there, along with the soaring costs of education, have contributed greatly to postponing marriage in many cases, and bearing children at all, or fewer numbers of children, and the fact that the number of women getting higher education has increased has contributed to fewer of them getting married younger, if at all. In the US, for example, females make up more than half of all college students, which is a reversal from a few decades back.

The relationship between higher education and childbearing varies by country: for example, in Switzerland by age 40, childlessness among women who had completed tertiary education is 40%, while in France it is only 15%. In some countries, childlessness has a longer tradition, and was common even before educational levels increased, but in others, such as Southern European ones, it is a recent phenomenon; for instance in Spain the childlessness rate for women aged 40–44 in 2011 was 21.60%, but historically throughout the 20th century it was around 10%. Not all countries show a relationship between low fertility and education: in Czech Republic, of women born in 1961–1965, low educated women were more likely to be childless than high educated women. In the United States in 2022, women between the ages of 15 and 50 with a graduate or professional degree had the highest birthrate (62 births per 1,000 women), whereas women between the ages of 15 and 50 with less than a high school graduate had the lowest birthrate (32 births per 1,000 women) among all levels of educational attainment of the mother.

==== A general trade-off ====
Infant mortality rates, under age 1, in 2013. Sub-Saharan Africa has the highest infant mortality rate, as well as the highest TFR.

People are more likely in modern society to invest strongly in the needs of their children, such as offering them the best education, shelter (a room only for the child), travel, cultural activities etc. In the past, when child mortality was high, people had more children, but invested less in them. Today, parents usually experience much less doubt about whether the child will live to adulthood, and so are more likely to strongly invest in that child. But strongly investing in each child makes it irrational to have a large numbers of children—this is a "quantity vs. quality trade-off"—with education as the most important such qualitative investment.

=== Economic fluctuation ===
The growth of wealth and human development are related to sub-replacement fertility, although a sudden drop in living conditions, such as the Great Depression, can also lower fertility.

In Eastern European countries, the fall of communism was followed by an economic collapse in many of these countries in the 1990s. Some countries, such as those that experienced violent conflicts in the 1990s, were badly affected. Large numbers of people lost their jobs, and massive unemployment, lack of jobs outside the big cities, and economic uncertainty discourages people from having children. For instance, in Bosnia-Herzegovina, the total fertility rate in 2016 was only 1.28 children born/woman.

Financial challenges such as increased housing prices, concern about job security, cost of raising children (child care, education cost) have also impact on TFR.

=== Urbanization ===
Some consider the increase of urbanization around the world a central cause. In recent times, residents of urban areas tend to have fewer children than people in rural areas. The need for extra labour from children on farms does not apply to urban-dwellers. Cities tend to have higher property prices, making a large family more expensive, especially in those societies where each child is now expected to have their own bedroom, rather than sharing with siblings as was the case until recently. Rural areas also tend to be more conservative, with less contraception and abortion than urban areas.

=== Reduction in child labour ===
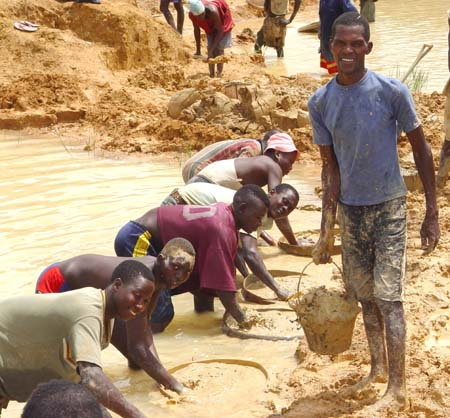
Child labor is common in many parts of the world.

Countries which have a high fertility rate are usually less-developed countries, where families rely on children to help them, with labour such as agricultural work, tending to livestock, or even paid work. In such countries child labour is quite common, with children bringing money home, or directly supporting the family through physical work. By contrast, in high-income nations, child labour is almost universally banned, and it is the parents who are expected to invest extensively into their children.

=== Views on the "ideal" family ===
Although fertility rates are often discussed in terms of state policies (e.g. financial benefits, combining work with family etc.), the deeply entrenched social views on what constitutes an "ideal" family may play a crucial role: if parents do not envision large families in a positive way, it is difficult to "persuade" them to have many children. In this regard, there are major differences between European countries: while 50.23% of women aged 15–39 state that the "ideal" family has 3 or more children in Estonia, and 46.43% say this in Finland; only 11.3% say this in Czech Republic, and 11.39% in Bulgaria.

=== Contraception ===
Changes in contraception are also an important cause, and one that has seen dramatic changes in the last few generations. Legalization and widespread acceptance of contraception in the developed world is a large factor in decreased fertility levels; however, for instance in a European context where its prevalence has always been very high in the modern era, the fertility rates do not seem to be influenced significantly by availability of contraception.

While contraception can reduce the number of unwanted births and contribute to a smaller ideal family size, contraception does not start fertility reductions nor substantially affect their size, with these being attributable to other factors.

=== Assisted reproductive technology ===
The availability of assisted reproductive technology (ART) may foster delay of childbearing, because many couples think that it can solve any future fertility problems. Its effect on total fertility rate is extremely small but government support for it is beneficial for families.

=== Human Development Index ===
The rough Human Development Index for each country. For more detailed data, see the List of countries by Human Development Index.: Very High High Medium / Low Data unavailable

The Human Development Index (HDI) is a composite statistic of life expectancy, education, and per capita income indicators, which are used to rank countries into four tiers of human development. A country scores higher HDI when the lifespan is higher, the education level is higher, and the GDP per capita is higher. There is a strong inverse correlation between the HDI and the fertility rate of the population: the higher the HDI, the lower the fertility rate. As of 2016, the countries with the highest fertility rate are Burundi, Mali, Somalia, Uganda, Burkina Faso, Zambia, Malawi, Angola, and Afghanistan; while most high-income countries have sub-replacement fertility rates. This is part of the fertility-income paradox, as these high fertility countries are very poor, and it may seem counter-intuitive for families there to have so many children. The inverse relationship between income and fertility has been termed a demographic-economic "paradox" by the notion that greater means would enable the production of more offspring as suggested by the influential Thomas Malthus.

=== Government policies ===
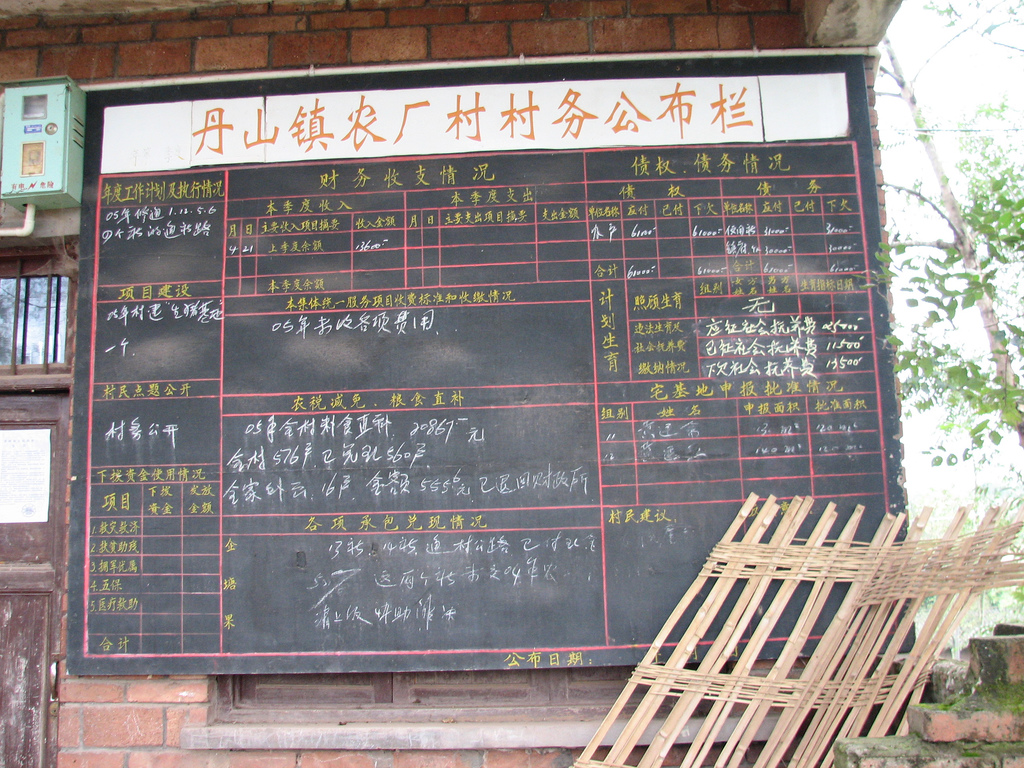
The Danshan, Sichuan Province Nongchang Village people Public Affairs Bulletin Board in September 2005 noted that RMB 25,000 in social compensation fees were owed in 2005, for violation of the one child policy. Thus far 11,500 RMB had been collected, so another 13,500 RMB had to be collected.

Some governments have launched programmes to reduce fertility rates and curb population growth. The People's Republic of China implemented a one-child policy for 35 years (from 1979 to 2015); this was relaxed to a two-child policy in 2016 and relaxed further to a three child policy in 2021.

Although today Singapore has a low fertility rate, and the government encourages parents to have more children because birth rates have fallen below the replacement rate, in the 1970s the situation was the opposite: the government wished to slow and reverse the boom in births that started after World War II.

=== Ability to choose ===
The total fertility rate is also influenced by the ability to choose what type of family to have, if and when to have children, and the number of children to have - free from coercion, pressure, or interference from the community, extended family, state or church. This includes prohibition on practices such as child marriage, forced marriage or bride price. In some cultures for instance, the payment of the bride price creates an obligation on the wife to have children, and failure to do so often results in threats and violence. High-income countries have substantially lower fertility rates, and increased childlessness, because people who remain childless or who have small families are less likely to be stigmatized. In many cultures childless women suffer discrimination, stigma, ostracism, and social isolation.

=== Tempo effect ===
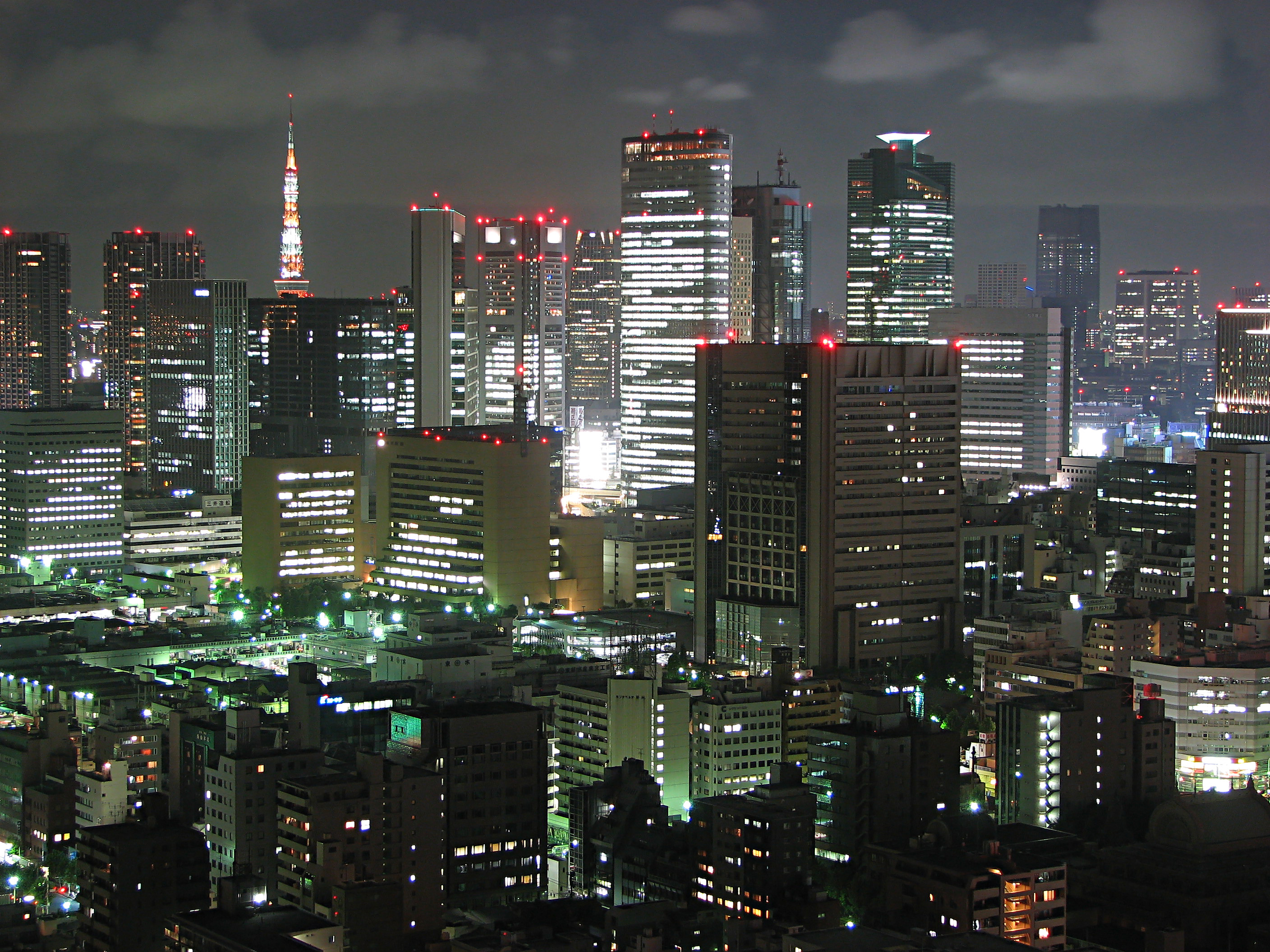
Japan, a highly developed country, has low fertility rates and a rapidly aging population.

Total fertility rate (TFR) is affected by a phenomenon called the tempo effect, which describes "distortions due to changes in the timing of births." John Bongaarts and Griffith Feeney have suggested that this tempo effect contributes to the decline of measured fertility rate. Specifically, the trend in developed countries of having children at later ages can cause the TFR to be underestimated. For example, as measured by the Human Fertility Database, the United States tempo-adjusted TFR was over a 2.1 replacement level between 1992 and 2015.

=== Type of partnership ===
A study of the United States and multiple countries in Europe came to the result that women who continue to cohabit rather than get married after birth have significantly lower probability of having a second child than married women in all countries except those in Eastern Europe. Another study, on the contrary, came to the result that cohabiting couples in France have equal fertility as married ones.

A large survey in the United States came to the result that married women had an average of 1.9 children, compared to 1.3 among those cohabiting. The corresponding numbers for men were 1.7 and 1.1, respectively. The difference of 0.6 children for both sexes was expected to decrease to between 0.2 and 0.3 over the lifetime when correcting for the confounder that married people have their children earlier in life. In the United States, those who cohabit without marrying had increased fertility when the male earns considerably more than the female.

=== Gender expectations and norms ===
Social norms both within the family and in society at large determine fertility levels. The quality of couple relations in terms of support given to the woman matters, with studies on fertility in the high-income world showing a U-shaped relationship between gender equity within the couple and fertility: in countries with very low fertility rates, the probability of a woman to have the second child occurs at the extremes - either very low gender equality or very high gender equality. This is also reflected at a social level: countries that are neither sufficiently patriarchal to coerce women into having large families, nor sufficiently egalitarian to incentivize women to have more children through strong support (such as subsidized childcare and good support of working mothers), have very low fertility rates, especially among educated women. Where women are expected to 'choose' between their professional and public life, or having children, the more educated the woman is, the more likely she is to choose the former. The strong emphasis on the domestic role of women in Germany (unlike Scandinavia and France) was described as the cause of the very low fertility in that country.

== Attempts to increase the fertility rate ==
There have been several historical attempts to increase the fertility rate via natalist policies that attempt to encourage women to have more children. Upon the establishment of the Roman Empire, Caesar Augustus introduced legislation designed to increase the birthrate. Men aged 20 to 60 and women aged 20 to 50 were legally obliged to marry, and widowed or divorced individuals within the relevant age range were required to remarry. Exemptions were granted to those who had already had three children in the case of free-born people and four in the case of freed slaves. For political or bureaucratic office, preference was given to those with at least three legitimate children. Diminished inheritance rights awaited those who failed to reproduce.

In modern times, one of the most forceful attempts to increase the TFR occurred in Communist Romania between 1967 and 1990. Communist leader Nicolae Ceaușescu adopted a very aggressive natalist policy that included outlawing abortion and contraception, routine pregnancy tests for women, taxes on childlessness, and legal discrimination against childless people. This period was depicted in movies and documentaries (such as 4 Months, 3 Weeks and 2 Days, Children of the Decree). These policies increased birth rates during the period of policy implementation, but was followed by a decline due to increased illegal abortion. Ceaușescu's policy resulted in over 9,000 women who died due to illegal abortions, large numbers of children put into orphanages by parents who could not cope with raising them, street children in the 1990s (when many orphanages were closed and the children ended up on the streets), and overcrowding in homes and schools. In addition, Ceaușescu's demographic policies are feared of having very serious effects in the future, because the generations born under Ceaușescu are large (especially the late 1960s and the 1970s), while those born in the 1990s and 2000s are very small. This is believed to cause a very serious demographic shock when the former generations retire, as there will be insufficient young people in the workforce to support the elderly. Apart from Romania, a relatively similar policy of restricted reproductive rights during that period also existed in Communist Albania, under Enver Hoxha (see Abortion in Albania).

At present, many governments provide financial incentives to have more children. These include tax allowances for working parents, improving child-care provision, reducing working hours/weekend working in female-dominated professions such as healthcare and a stricter enforcement of anti-discrimination measures to prevent professional women's promotion prospects being hindered when they take time off work to care for children. In 2002, Australia introduced a Baby Bonus that did increase birth rates in the years immediately after. The fertility rate also increased to around 2.0 in France and 1.9 in the United Kingdom and some other northern European countries, but the role of population policies in these trends is debated. In Italy, for example, natalist policies may have actually discouraged the Italian population from having more children. This "widespread resistance" was the result of the Italian government, at one point, taxing single persons and criminalizing abortion and even contraception.

European analysts hope, with the help of government incentives and large-scale change towards family-friendly policies, to stall the population decline and reverse it by around 2030, expecting that most of Europe will have a slight natural increase by then. C. D. Howe Institute, for example, tries to demonstrate that immigration cannot be used to effectively counter population ageing.

== Current effects ==
Population aging may pose an economic challenge to governments as the number of retired citizens drawing public pensions rises in relation to the number of workers. This has been raised as a political issue in France, Germany, and the United States where many people have advocated policy changes to encourage higher birth and immigration rates.

Analysing data for 40 countries, Lee et al. show that typically fertility well above replacement and population growth would be most beneficial for government budgets. Fertility near replacement and population stability, however, would be most beneficial for standards of living when the analysis includes the effects of age structure on families as well as governments. Fertility moderately below replacement and population decline would maximize standards of living when the cost of providing capital for a growing labour force is taken into account.

== Forecasts ==
United Nations' population projections by location. Note the vertical axis is logarithmic and represents millions of people.

Sub-replacement fertility does not automatically translate into a population decline because of increasing life expectancy and population momentum: recently high fertility rates produce a disproportionately young population, and younger populations have higher birth rates. This is why some nations with sub-replacement fertility still have a growing population, because a relatively large fraction of their population are still of child-bearing age. But if the fertility trend is sustained (and not compensated by immigration), it results in population ageing and/or population decline. This is already happening and impacts most of the countries of Europe and East Asia.

Current estimates expect the world's total fertility rate to fall below replacement levels by 2050. There are several projections of population growth after 2050. The UN Population Division projects the world population, which is 7.8 billion as of 2020, to level out around 2100 at 10.9 billion. A 2020 study published by The Lancet from researchers funded by the Global Burden of Disease Study promotes a lower growth scenario, projecting that world population will peak in 2064 at 9.7 billion and then decline to 8.8 billion in 2100. An analysis from the Wittgenstein Center IIASA predicts global population to peak in 2070 at 9.4 billion and then decline to 9.0 billion in 2100.

== Cases of fertility rate increases in individual countries ==
=== European Union ===
EU fertility has declined in the 2020s.

The fertility rate in the European Union declined significantly in the early 2020s.

=== United States ===
The fertility rate in the U.S. has been in a downward trend, and is now below the replacement rate of 2.1 births.

For twenty years, the total fertility rate in the United States remained relatively stable compared to much of the world. However, US TFR declined from 2.12 in 2007 to 1.64 in 2020.

=== Other developed countries ===
Some other developed countries experienced temporary increases in their birth rate in the first decade of the 21st century before seeing TFR steadily decline to all-time lows in the subsequent decade, including France, which recorded a TFR of over 2.00 in 2008, though it has since declined to 1.8 as 2020; the United Kingdom where TFR increased from 1.64 in 2000 to 1.98 in 2010, and then declined to 1.6 in 2020; Australia, where the birth rate rose from 1.73 in 2001 to 1.93 in 2007 before declining to 1.6 in 2020, and New Zealand, where the TFR was 2.2 in 2008 and then declined to 1.6 in 2020.

Israel is the only developed country that has never had sub-replacement fertility; a declining Arab and Bedouin fertility rate is countered by religious Jewish groups (mostly Haredim) with higher than average fertility rates. In addition, the (mostly non-religious) aliyah Jews from the former USSR shifted from a 1 child per woman fertility rate to an average fertility rate close to 2.2 children per woman. As of 2023, Israel's Jewish fertility rate is the highest among OECD countries.

== See also ==
- Fertility and intelligence
- Population decline
- Natalism in public policy for attempts at reversing sub-replacement fertility without engaging mass immigration
- Demography
- List of countries and territories by fertility rate
- Zero population growth

Economic dynamics

- Income and fertility
- Dependency ratio
- Economic collapse
- Pensions crisis
