= Cheikh Mbacke =

Senegalese statistician

Cheikh Mbacké
- Born: Cheikh Seydil Moctar Mbacké; Nioro du Rip
- Education: Paris Institute of Statistics (BS); University of Pennsylvania (PhD)
- Known for: Demographic research
- Awards: Foreign Associate of the National Academy of Sciences (2018)
- Scientific career
- Fields: Biostatistics
- Workplaces: Rockefeller Foundation; Université de Thiès
- Thesis: Estimating child mortality from retrospective reports by mothers at time of a new birth : the case of the EMIS surveys (1986)
- Website: indepth-network.org/dr-cheikh-mbacke

Cheikh Seydil Moctar Mbacké is a Senegalese statistician. He is a research fellow in the Center for Research on Applied Economics and Finance at the Université de Thiès in Senegal. He works in international development, with a particular focus on population and health research in Sub-Saharan Africa. Mbacke was elected a Foreign Associate of the National Academy of Sciences (NAS) in 2018.

== Early life and education ==
Mbacké is from Nioro du Rip, a small town in Senegal. He was raised speaking Wolof language, English and Spanish. He studied statistics at the Institute of Statistics of the University of Paris, and graduated with a bachelor's degree. He earned his master's degree in Demography at the Institute of Demographic Training and Research in Yaoundé. He joined the civil service in the Senegalese Statistic Bureau in 1976. Mbacké moved to the University of Pennsylvania for his doctoral studies, earning a Ph.D. degree in statistics in 1986.

== Career and research ==
After graduating, Mbacké moved to Bamako, where he started his career as a demographic researcher. He worked at the Unité Socio-Economique et de Démographie (USED). Here he was involved with the first Senegalese census. Mbacké joined the International Union for the Scientific Study of Population (IUSSP) in 1989.

Mbacké advocated for the expansion of USED, and soon it became the Centre d'Études et de Recherche sur la Population pour le Développement (CERPOD). He was eventually appointed Head of the Training Division at the Sahel Population and Development Research Center.

In 1992 Mbacké left CERPOD to create a Rockefeller Foundation African population science office in Nairobi. He led a series of research projects that connect international foundations with researchers in Africa. He was appointed the Rockefeller Foundation Representative for Africa in 1999 and Director of Africa Programs in 2000. He was awarded the Rockefeller Foundation Outstanding Achievement Award in 2003. In 2003 he moved to the Rockefeller Foundation headquarters in New York City, where was made Vice President for Regional Planning.

He joined the population program at the William and Flora Hewlett Foundation in 2006 as a senior advisor. In this capacity he supports the training of African population scientists. Mbacké has argued that African leadership has to make sustainable health policies. He served on the council of the IUSSP between 2010 and 2013.

He joined Center for Research on Applied Economics and Finance at the Université de Thiès in 2015, where he uses the National Transfer Accounts approach to study demographic change and economic growth. That year he was named the IUSSP laureate. The Hewlett Foundation described the impact of Mbacké's work,

"Almost every African demographer, and many population scientists from other regions, can trace a pivotal moment in their own careers to advice, support, ideas, and constructive critique offered by Cheikh Mbacké."

Mbacké is Chair of the Board of Directors of Tostan, an organisation in Africa that looks to develop rural communities in Africa. He serves on the Board of Directors of the African Institute for Development Policy. He is a member of the World Health Organization (WHO) African advisory committee on health research and development.

=== Awards and honors ===
Mbacké was elected a foreign associate of the National Academy of Sciences (NAS) in 2018.
