= Stefanie DeLuca =

Urban sociologist

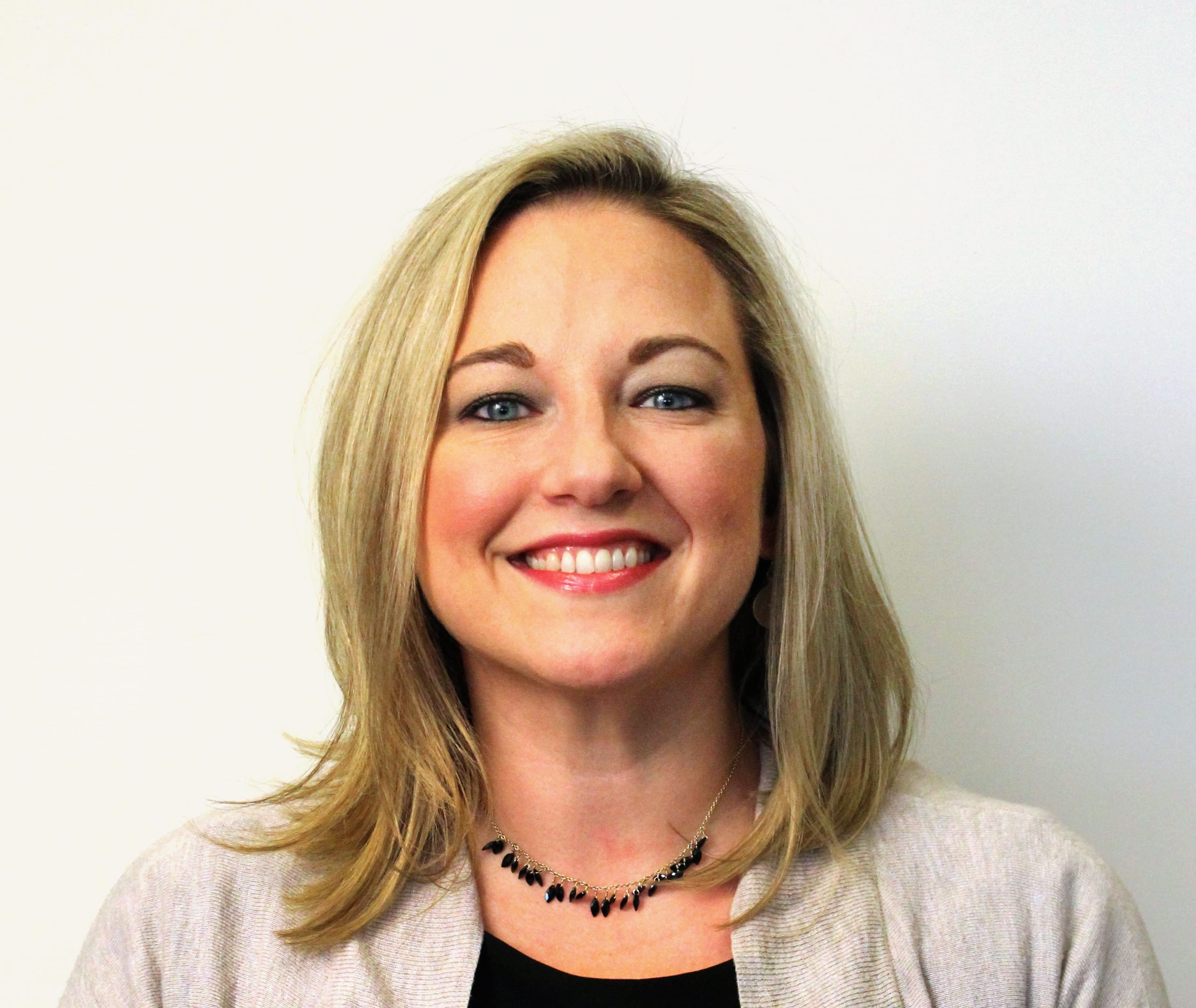
- Occupation: Professor
- Awards: 2017 William F. Goode Distinguished Book Award

Academic background
- Education: Northwestern University

Academic work
- Discipline: Sociologist
- Sub-discipline: Housing Policy
- Notable works: Coming of Age in the Other America
- Website: http://soc.jhu.edu/directory/stefanie-a-deluca

Stefanie Deluca is a sociologist and the James Coleman Professor of Sociology at Johns Hopkins University. She co-wrote the book, Coming of Age in the Other America. Deluca received her Ph.D. in Human Development and Social Policy at Northwestern University in 2002 and bachelor's degrees in Psychology and Sociology at the University of Chicago.

== Professional activity ==
Dr. DeLuca's research uses sociological perspectives to inform education and housing policy. She has conducted mixed-methods studies that incorporate qualitative research into experimental or quasi-experimental designs. Some of her work focuses on the long-term effects of programs to help public housing residents relocate to safer neighborhoods and better schools through housing vouchers.

DeLuca co-authored a book about the transition to adulthood for youth in Baltimore, Coming of Age in the Other America (with Susan Clampet-Lundquist and Kathryn Edin). The book was named an Outstanding Academic Title from the American Library Association and the William F. Goode Award from the American Sociological Association. She was awarded a William T. Grant Foundation Scholars Award to study residential mobility, neighborhoods and family life among very poor families in the South.

Her work has been funded by the Department of Housing and Urban Development, the National Science Foundation, the Annie E. Casey Foundation, the Spencer Foundation, the MacArthur Foundation, the Abell Foundation, the National Academy of Education, the American Educational Research Association and the Department of Education.

In March 2006, DeLuca testified in federal court on behalf of the plaintiffs in the Baltimore Thompson v. HUD housing desegregation case, using her research on housing programs as the basis for her testimony.

DeLuca has presented her work as part of an exhibit at the National Museum of American History. She previously served on a MacArthur Foundation research network on the effects of housing on young children, is a fellow at The Century Foundation, and is a member of the policy advisory board at The Reinvestment Fund.

Stefanie DeLuca was recently named Scholar of the Year by the National Alliance of Resident Services in Assisted and Affordable Housing.

In the wake of the 2015 Baltimore Protests (in reaction to the Death of Freddie Gray), significant national attention was paid to work, such as DeLuca's, which studies housing policy among the systemic problems facing the City of Baltimore.

== Publications ==
=== Books ===
- DeLuca, Stefanie and Kathryn Edin. Coming of Age in the Other America. New York: Russell Sage Foundation, 2016. ISBN 0871544652.

=== Articles ===
- DeLuca, Stefanie and Robert Bozick. 2005. "Better Late Than Never? Delayed Enrollment in the High School to College Transition." Social Forces 84(1): 527-550.
- Plank, Stephen, Stefanie DeLuca and Angela Estacion. 2008. "High School Dropout and the Role of Career and Technical Education: A Survival Analysis of Surviving High School." Sociology of Education 81: 345–370.
- Rosenbaum, James E., Lisa Reynolds and Stefanie DeLuca. 2002. "How Do Places Matter? The Geography of Opportunity, Self-Efficacy, and a Look Inside the Black Box of Residential Mobility." Housing Studies, 17:71-82.
- Keels, Micere, Greg J. Duncan, Stefanie DeLuca, Ruby Mendenhall, and James E. Rosenbaum. 2005. "Fifteen Years Later: Can Residential Mobility Programs Provide a Permanent Escape from Neighborhood Crime and Poverty?" Demography 42 (1): 51-73.
- Rosenbaum, James E., Stefanie DeLuca, Shazia R. Miller, and Kevin Roy. 1999. "Pathways into Work: Short and Long Term Effects of Personal and Institutional Ties."Sociology of Education, 72, 179–196.
- Mendenhall, Ruby, Stefanie DeLuca and Greg Duncan. 2006. "Neighborhood Resources and Economic Mobility: Results from the Gautreaux Program" Social Science Research 35:892-923.
- DeLuca, Stefanie and Elizabeth Dayton. 2009. "Switching Social Contexts: The Effects of Housing Mobility and School Choice Programs on Youth Outcomes." Annual Review of Sociology 35: 457–491.
- Gasper, Joseph, Stefanie DeLuca and Angela Estacion. 2012. "Switching High Schools: Reconsidering the Relationship between School Mobility and Dropout" American Educational Research Journal 49: 487–519.
- Gasper, Joseph, Stefanie DeLuca and Angela Estacion. 2010. "Coming and Going: The Effects of Residential and School Mobility on Delinquency." Social Science Research 39: 459–476.
- DeLuca, Stefanie and Peter Rosenblatt. 2010. "Does Moving To Better Neighborhoods Lead to Better Schooling Opportunities? Parental School Choice in an Experimental Housing Voucher Program." Teachers College Record 112 (5) 1441-1489.
