= Raymond Pearl =

American biologist (1879–1940)

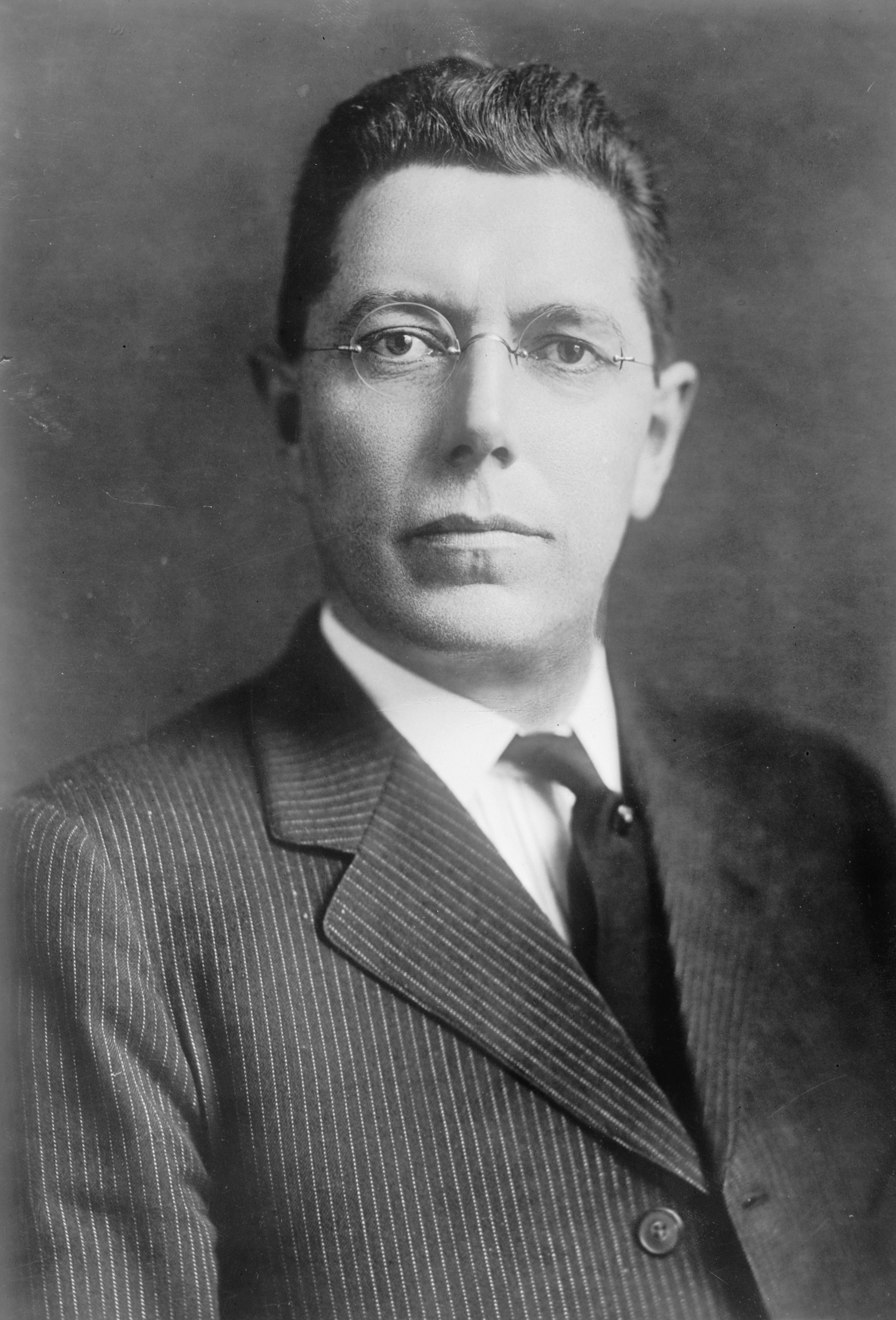
- Born: June 3, 1879; Farmington, New Hampshire
- Died: November 17, 1940 (aged 61); Baltimore, Maryland
- Education: University of Michigan
- Scientific career
- Fields: Biogerontology
- Workplaces: Johns Hopkins University
- Author abbrev. (botany): Pearl

Raymond Pearl (June 3, 1879 – November 17, 1940) was an American biologist, regarded as one of the founders of biogerontology. He spent most of his career at Johns Hopkins University in Baltimore. Pearl was a prolific writer of academic books, papers and articles, as well as a committed populariser and communicator of science. At his death, 841 publications were listed against his name. An early eugenicist, he eventually became an important critic of eugenics.

== Early life ==
Pearl was born into an upper-middle-class family on June 3, 1879, in Farmington, New Hampshire, the son of Ida May (McDuffee) and Frank Pearl. At an early age, Pearl was exposed to the classics. His parents and grandparents wanted him to study Greek and Latin. However, when he attended Dartmouth College at 16 years old, he became fascinated by biology and graduated with a B.A. as the youngest in his class. At Dartmouth, he was known to be an exceptional student as well as a skilled musician. He was capable of playing almost every wind instrument, and he planned amateur music performances with his friends and colleagues. In 1899, Pearl attended the University of Michigan where he received his PhD in zoology for his work on the behavior of planarians. He also was involved in studying the variation of fish for the Biological Survey of the Great Lakes. While working in a zoological laboratory, he met his future wife, Maude M. De Witt. In 1903, they married, and together in 1905 and 1906, they traveled abroad and worked at the University of London, University of Leipzig, and Marine Biological Station in Naples. Maude edited and wrote book reviews for the journal Human Biology. After Raymond Pearl's death Maude became the managing editor of the journal.

In 1906, he spent a year studying under Karl Pearson at University College, London. During this year he discovered biometry, which seemed to offer a solution to the problems he was concerned with in biology, zoology and eugenics. On his return to the US he continued his interests, but was converted from biometry to Mendelian genetics.

== Career ==
Pearl's interest in statistical methods in biology began at the University of London, where he worked alongside Karl Pearson. He stayed as an instructor at the University of Michigan until 1906, and that same year, he went to the University of Pennsylvania to be an instructor in zoology. A year later, he became the head of the Department of Biology of the Main Agricultural Experiment Station at the University of Maine in Orono where he studied the genetics of poultry and other domestic animals. From 1917 to 1919, Pearl was the Chief of the Statistical Division of the United States Food Administration. In 1918, Pearl developed a department of laboratory statistics when he was recruited by Johns Hopkins University to be the Professor of Biometry and Vital Statistics.

In 1920 he was elected as a Fellow of the American Statistical Association, which he also served as president. He was also an elected member of the American Philosophical Society, the United States National Academy of Sciences, and the American Academy of Arts and Sciences.

== Wilson's attack ==
In 1929, Pearl's friend William Morton Wheeler was about to retire as the Dean of the Bussey Institution at Harvard University. At this time, there were plans to alter the current biological departments and create a field of human biology at Harvard. Due to his connections at Harvard, Pearl was mentioned as a possible candidate to succeed Wheeler and had many supporters there. However, Edwin Bidwell Wilson, a Harvard mathematician, was a critic of Pearl and did not believe he was fit for this position. Wilson believed that great detail and attention should be used when dealing with the math of biological data and thought that Pearl had been messy with his handling and reasoning of math in the field of biology. Wilson's first issue with Pearl was his study of population growth in the 1920s. Pearl stated that he discovered the law of population that represented an S-shaped curve of growth, but Wilson thought that his data was insufficient and did not support this assertion.

Despite his criticism of Pearl, in 1925, Wilson reached out to Pearl for help on his cancer research. Pearl was unaware of Wilson's criticism of him at the time. He did not help Wilson because he thought that he did not have a sufficient understanding of the biological and medical fields, which further ignited Wilson's distaste of Pearl. In 1929, Pearl conducted research on the correlation between tuberculosis and cancer and published a paper that claimed that there is a negative correlation. This research had mistakes in its data analysis, so Wilson saw this study as an opportunity to attack Pearl and prevent him from becoming the new dean. Wilson denounced Pearl's use of mathematics in the cancer study to different departments at Harvard and published about it as well. His efforts paid off as the Board of Overseers at Harvard rejected Pearl's nomination by a vote of ten to nine. Pearl continued his scientific pursuits at Hopkins until his death.

== Eugenics, medicine, population, and politics ==
Pearl was a eugenicist who held traditional Galtonian beliefs. He wanted to use eugenics and biometry in medicine and public health in order to gain knowledge of human heredity.

Pearl founded the Constitutional Clinic at the Johns Hopkins Hospital. He believed in constitutional medicine, which focuses on examining the soil on which a seed falls. He later became the director of a new Institute of Biological Research at Johns Hopkins in 1925 that was aimed at examining the genetics and environmental factors of disease. This research institute combined biometry, genetics, and medicine to investigate the hereditary predisposition of tuberculosis and hypertension. When conducting his research of these diseases, Pearl recorded the height, weight, handedness, measurements of different body parts, and physical descriptions. Just like Galton, he believed that race was an important factor in human characteristics and believed in using biology and genetics to improve the long-term health of the population. Although he tried to be quantitative, objective, and systematic, his classifications of different races were influenced by social norms and prejudices.

However, in the late 1920s, Pearl condemned eugenics. Pearl criticized the use of race in eugenics despite conducting research that recognized racial differences. He believed that eugenics was doing the right thing badly and that human biology was eugenics done right if it consisted of reliable statistics, objectivity, a liberal social agenda, and medical affiliations. In 1927, he published the landmark article The Biology of Superiority, which attacked the basic assumptions of eugenics. The article was the first general attack on eugenics by someone perceived as being within the movement. It also contributed to the emergence of reform eugenics and the population control movement.

Pearl was an influential member of the Advisory Committee of the World Population Conference, after which Pearl helped found the International Union for the Scientific Study of Population Problems. Pearl's ideas about human population growth, which were separable from his ideas about eugenics, owed to both his biological research but also the role he believed population played in the origins of World War I as well as his concern that mass consumption would push against resource limits. His research on population limits helped develop the concept of carrying capacity.

Despite his apparent rejection of eugenics, Pearl maintained relatively good relations with key eugenicists and expressed classist views. He made statements which have been interpreted as being anti-Semitic. From 1927 to 1932, Pearl and his colleague Alan Meyer were important figures of one of the first birth control clinics in the United States called Baltimore's Bureau for Contraceptive Advice. Pearl was a supporter of birth control, but had a more conservative and scientific approach when compared to the ideologies of Margaret Sanger. The clinic performed a eugenic medicine study that looked at how the distribution of birth control information that was provided by a clinic affected society.

== Scientific interests ==
Pearl's main focus of interest was in biostatistics. As one of the first biostatisticians to use mathematics as a way to interpret population genetics, Pearl published a book called Modes of Research in Genetics in 1915 and another book called Introduction to Medical Biometry and Statistics in 1923. They were both widely read and were influential in showing the importance of statistics in the genetic and medical fields.

Even though many of his books were well-received, some of his beliefs still caused controversy. One such belief was that when a brother and sister reproduce, there would not be an increase in homozygosity. Pearl believed that with brother-sister breeding and no selection past the F3 generation, heterozygosity would not fall below 50%.

While his main interest was biostatistics, Pearl had a wide range of interests in biology and was known for his broad knowledge of the subject. He published works on animal behavior, population growth, food and prices, Jewish and Christian marriages, and vegetarianism. In the 1920s and 1930s, Pearl focused on the effect that the environment, which included disease, alcohol, and tobacco, has on longevity. He published a book called Alcohol and Longevity in 1926, where he claimed that moderate consumption of alcohol could be beneficial for cardiovascular health, which was met with much debate due to prohibition. Controversy continued when Pearl conducted a study on tobacco in which he demonstrated that smoking decreases longevity while drinking does not.

Pearl is regarded as one of founders of biogerontology. In 1908 Max Rubner observed that mammals of different size and longevity had equal mass specific metabolic output. Partly based on the observation that the longevity of fruit flies varies inversely with ambient temperature, Pearl (like Rubner) also asserted that maximum life span is inversely proportional to basal metabolic rate. Pearl accepted Alexis Carrel's erroneous ideas that normal somatic cells don't age, and that aging must therefore be due to dysfunction at the body level. Pearl speculated that lifespan was limited by vital cell components that were depleted or damaged more rapidly in animals with faster metabolisms. Denham Harman's free-radical theory of aging later provided a plausible causal mechanism for Pearl's hypothesis.

The Rate of Living Hypothesis enjoyed prominence as one of the foremost theories of aging for nearly 50 years. The Rate of Living Hypothesis is undermined by the observation that a rat and a bat have similar metabolic rate, but a bat lives several times longer. More recently, further doubts have been raised on the Rate of Living Hypothesis by the demonstration that, when modern statistical methods for correcting for the effects of body size and phylogeny are employed, metabolic rate does not correlate with longevity in mammals or birds. (For a critique of the Rate of Living Hypothesis see Living fast, dying when?.)

== Social habits and death ==
Pearl was widely known for his lust for life and his love of food, drink, music and parties. He was a key member of the Saturday Night Club which also included H. L. Mencken. Prohibition made no dent in Pearl's drinking habits (which were legendary).

Raymond Pearl is, also, known for his population biology work, as in his 1928 volume, The Rate of Living: Being an Account of Some Experimental Studies on the Biology of Life Duration. In this book, he presents extensive research regarding population density effects on life duration in fruit flies, demonstrating that an optimal population density existed for that insect in his experimental model. This raised the question of whether or not the same effect might not occur in other species, including humans. His work demonstrating longer lifespans for flies with lower metabolic rates, also, raised the question of whether or not a similar phenomenon might be found in other species, including humans. Thus, he became a mentor to John B. Calhoun, famous for his ecological studies of rodent populations and their possible importance for modern humans. Population density effects on duration of life is thought, by population biologists, to be Raymond Pearl's greatest contribution to biological science.

In November 1940, Pearl was in apparently good health and paid a visit to the Baltimore Zoo. He cut his trip short complaining of chest pains and died later that day.

== See also ==
- Life extension
- Maximum life span
- Senescence (aging theories)
