= The Injustice of Place =

Social sciences book

- Author: Kathryn J. Edin, H. Luke Shaefer, and Timothy J. Nelson
- Publisher: Mariner Books
- Publication date: August 8, 2023
- Pages: 352
- ISBN: 9780063239494

The Injustice of Place: Uncovering the Legacy of Poverty in America is non-fiction social sciences book by Kathryn J. Edin, H. Luke Shaefer, and Timothy J. Nelson. The book explores how historical events have led to poverty and other social issues in the modern day.

== Synopsis ==
The book shows how today's poverty comes from the past. Rich people used the land and the workers to make money. Coal mining, cotton farming, and tobacco farming are big examples. These jobs created a huge gap between the rich and the poor. That gap stayed there even after those jobs left. Now, people in these towns are still stuck being poor. The authors say being stuck like this leads to other bad things. For example, it is a big reason for violence in these communities.

== Reception ==
The book was covered by an article in The 19th. The review mentions that rural communities of color are the country's most disadvantaged areas. It also mentions that women carry the heaviest burden of this poverty. The book attributes these to historical inequality and failing infrastructure.

Kirkus Reviews gave the book a starred review. The review highlighted its mix of statistics and personal stories. It called the analysis of American poverty highly readable.

The Center on Rural Innovation analyzed the book's policy themes. The review noted the text's focus on systemic issues rather than individual choices. It also highlighted the argument for local investments in rural areas.

WHYY-FM interviewed the authors. The segment covered their research on deep rural poverty. The discussion focused on the historical causes of this poverty.
