= Kathryn Edin =

American sociologist and professor of sociology and public affairs

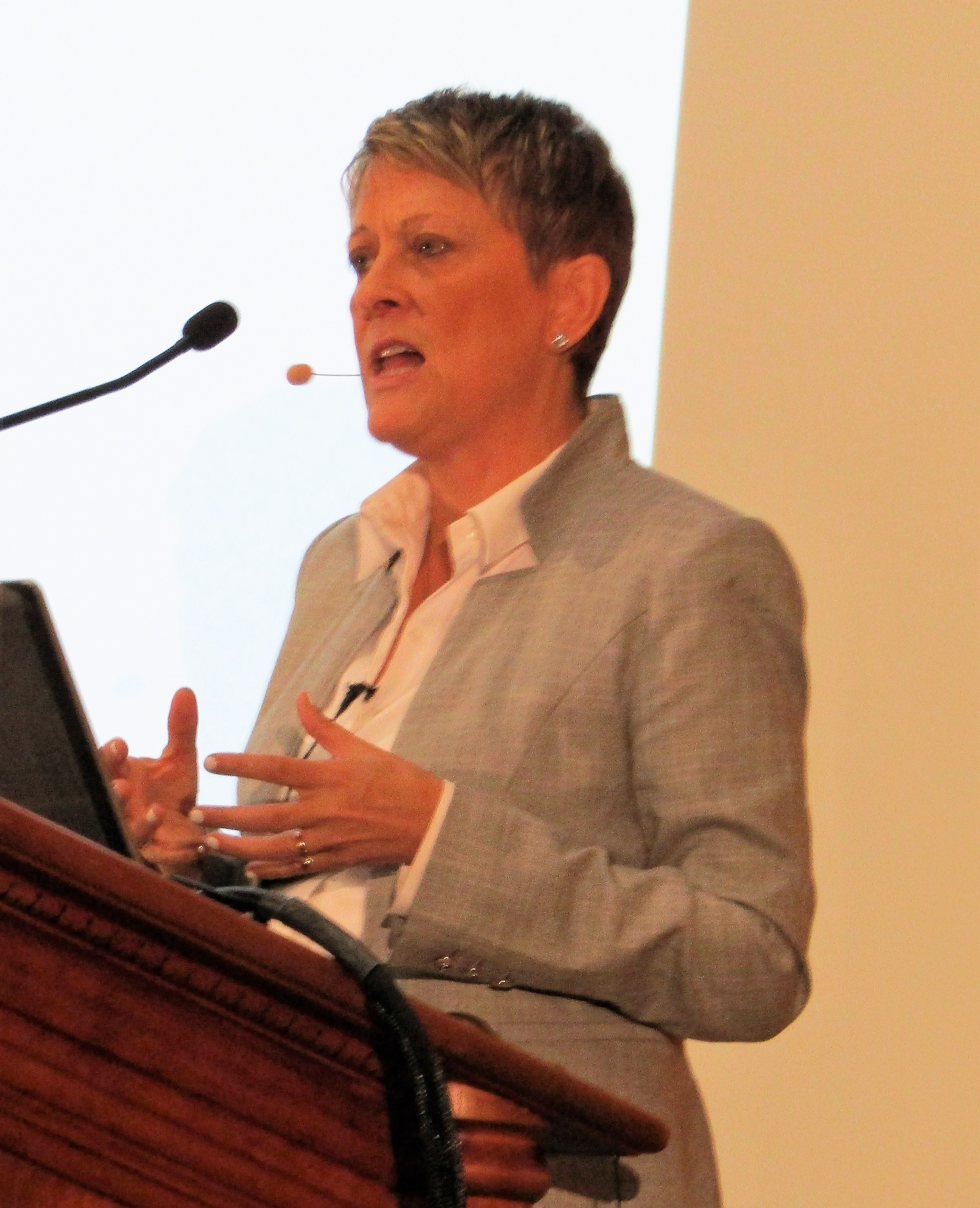
Kathryn Edin speaking at Brigham Young University.

Kathryn J. Edin, is an American sociologist and a professor of sociology and public affairs at the Princeton School of Public and International Affairs at Princeton University. She specializes in the study of people living on welfare. Two of her books are Making ends meet: how single mothers survive welfare and low-wage work, and Promises I can keep: why poor women put motherhood before marriage.

In 2023, she was elected to the American Philosophical Society.

== Life and career ==
Edin graduated with a B.A. in sociology from North Park University in 1984. She then pursued graduate studies at Northwestern University, where she received a M.A. in sociology in 1988 and a Ph.D. in sociology in 1989 after completing a doctoral dissertation titled "There's a lot of month left at the end of the money: how welfare recipients in Chicago make ends meet."

In February 2014, Edin was named a Bloomberg Distinguished Professor at Johns Hopkins University for her accomplishments as an interdisciplinary researcher and excellence in teaching the next generation of scholars. In that same year, Edin was elected as a member to both the National Academy of Sciences and the American Academy of Political and Social Sciences.

In 2017, Edin was elected as a member to the National Academy of Social Insurance. Most recently, she was elected as a member of the American Academy of Arts and Sciences in 2019.

== Publications ==
=== Books ===
- Edin, Kathryn J., et al. Injustice of Place: Uncovering the Legacy of Poverty in America. Mariner Books, 2023. ISBN 9780063239494
- DeLuca, Stefanie, Susan Clampet-Lundquist and Kathryn Edin (2016). Coming of Age in the Other America. New York: Russell Sage Foundation. ISBN 0871544652.
- $2.00 a Day: Living on Almost Nothing in America (Houghton Mifflin Harcourt, 2015)
- Edin, Kathryn and Timothy J. Nelson. Doing the Best I Can: Fatherhood in the Inner City. Berkeley: University of California Press, 2013. ISBN 0520274067.
- Edin, Kathryn; England, Paula (2007). Unmarried couples with children. New York: Russell Sage Foundation. ISBN 9780871543172.
- Edin, Kathryn, and Maria Kefalas. Promises I Can Keep: Why Poor Women Put Motherhood Before Marriage. Berkeley: University of California Press, 2005. ISBN 978-0-520-24819-9
- Edin, Kathryn, and Laura Lein. Making Ends Meet: How Single Mothers Survive Welfare and Low-Wage Work. New York: Russell Sage Foundation, 1997 ISBN 978-0-87154-229-8
  - Review, by Sally Young Conrad; Journal of Public Health Policy, 1997, vol. 18, no. 4, p. 480-484
  - Review, by Susan Jacoby The New York Times book review. (May 4, 1997): 10
  - Review, by Ruth Sidel; The Women's Review of Books, Sep., 1997, vol. 14, no. 12, p. 27-28
  - Review, by Jane Waldfogel; Industrial and Labor Relations Review, Apr., 1998, vol. 51, no. 3, p. 529-530
  - Review, by Erin L Kelly; Gender and Society, Aug., 1998, vol. 12, no. 4, p. 485-487
  - Review, by Ralph Da Costa Nunez Political Science Quarterly, Summer, 1998, vol. 113, no. 2, p. 350-351
  - Review, by Irma McClaurin: American Anthropologist. 100, no. 1, (1998): 231
  - Review, by Aldon Morris; Contemporary Sociology, Nov., 1998, vol. 27, no. 6, p. 564-566
  - Review, by Frances Fox Piven American Journal of Sociology, Mar., 1998, vol. 103, no. 5, p. 1461-1463
  - Review, by Elizabeth Cooksey Population Studies, Mar., 2000, vol. 54, no. 1, p. 117-118

== Peer-reviewed journal articles (selected) ==
- Edin, Kathryn. 2000. "What Do Low-Income Single Mothers Say About Marriage?" Social Problems. 47, no. 1: 112–133.
- Gibson-Davis, Christina M., Kathryn Edin, and Sara McLanahan. 2005. "High Hopes but Even Higher Expectations: The Retreat From Marriage Among Low-Income Couples". Journal of Marriage and Family. 67, no. 5: 1301–1312.
- Laura Tach; Kathryn Edin "The Relationship Contexts of Young Disadvantaged Men" Annals of the American Academy of Political and Social Science, 635, no. 1 (2011): 76–94

== Reports ==
- Edin, Kathryn, Laura Lein, and Timothy Nelson. Low-Income, Non-Residential Fathers Off-Balance in a Competitive Economy, in Initial Analysis. Washington, D.C.: U.S. Dept. of Health and Human Services, 1998. OCLC 50199268
- Edin, Kathryn, Kathleen Mullan Harris, and Gary D. Sandefur. Welfare to Work: Opportunities and Pitfalls : Congressional Seminar, March 10, 1997. Washington, DC: Spivack Program in Applied Social Research and Social Policy, American Sociological Association, 1998. ISBN 978-0-912764-33-7
