= Florencia Torche =

Chilean sociologist

- Born: Chile

Academic background
- Education: Pontifical Catholic University of Chile (BA); Columbia University (MA, PhD)
- Thesis: Mobility Patterns in Chile in Comparative Perspective

Academic work
- Institutions: Princeton University; Stanford University; New York University; Queens College, City University of New York
- Main interests: Stratification and Mobility; Social Demography; Social Determinants of Health

Florencia Torche is a Chilean sociologist. She is the Edwards S. Sanford Professor of Public and International Affairs and Sociology at Princeton University. Torche is a Fellow of the American Academy of Arts and Sciences and National Academy of Sciences. Her research focuses on the persistence of inequality across generations.

== Early life and education ==
Torche was born and raised in Chile during Augusto Pinochet's reign. She earned her Bachelor of Arts degree from Catholic University of Chile before moving to the United States for her Master's degree and PhD at Columbia University.

== Career ==
Upon completing her PhD in 2004, Torche became an assistant professor of Sociology at Queens College, City University of New York. She left the institution in 2006 to become an associate professor at New York University (NYU). During her early years at NYU, Torche studied social mobility in Latin America compared to the United States and Europe. She received NYU's Stephen Charney Vladeck Junior Faculty Fellowship in 2009 to fund her assessment of the modern-day "worth" of a United States college degree.

Torche left NYU in 2016 to become a professor of sociology at Stanford University. In early 2020, Torche was recognized by the American Academy of Arts and Sciences and National Academy of Sciences in recognition of her research into inequality. During the COVID-19 pandemic, Torche and sociologist Jenna Nobles conducted studies on the impact of the COVID-19 pandemic in California on women of different socioeconomic status. They found that women of lower socioeconomic status were more likely to be exposed to COVID-19 while pregnant and often gave birth prematurely. This study earned them one of the 2023 Cozzarelli Prizes from the National Academy of Sciences. Torche was also named the American Academy of Political and Social Science's inaugural Sara McLanahan Fellow. Following her promotion to Dunlevie Family Professor at Princeton in 2022, Torche was selected as a Fellow of the Center for Advanced Study in the Behavioral Sciences for the 2023–24 academic year.

Torche left Stanford in 2024 to become the Edwards S. Sanford Professor of Sociology and International Affairs at Princeton University.

== See also ==
- List of members of the National Academy of Sciences (Social and political sciences)
