= International Conference on Population and Development =

UN conference held in Cairo from 5–13 September 1994

The United Nations coordinated an International Conference on Population and Development (ICPD) in Cairo, Egypt, on 5–13 September 1994. Its resulting Programme of Action is the steering document for the United Nations Population Fund (UNFPA). After two years of preparation, 179 nations met in Cairo in September 1994 and adopted a 20-year Programme of Action. Core principles included establishing human rights—particularly reproductive rights—at the center of sustainable development, empowering women, and focusing on health, education, and gender equality.

Some 20,000 delegates from various governments, UN agencies, NGOs, and the media gathered for a discussion of a variety of population issues, including immigration, infant mortality, birth control, family planning, the education of women, and protection for women from unsafe abortion services.

== Context and history ==
The first World Population Conference, organised by the League of Nations and Margaret Sanger, had been held at the Salle Central in Geneva, Switzerland from 29 August to 3 September 1927.

The first World Population Conference sponsored by the United Nations was held in 1954 in Rome, a second in 1965 in Belgrade, a third in 1974 in Bucharest, a fourth in 1984 in Mexico City.

== Advocacy and criticism ==
The conference received considerable media attention due to disputes regarding the assertion of reproductive rights. The Holy See and several predominantly Islamic nations were staunch critics, and U.S. President Bill Clinton received considerable criticism from conservatives for his participation, considering the fact that President Ronald Reagan did not attend or fund the previous conference held in Mexico City in 1984. The official spokesman for the Holy See was archbishop Renato Martino.

=== Abortion ===
During and after the ICPD, some interested parties attempted to interpret the term 'reproductive health' in the sense that it implies abortion as a means of family planning or, indeed, a right to abortion. These interpretations, however, do not reflect the consensus reached at the Conference. For the European Union, where legislation on abortion is less restrictive than elsewhere, the Council Presidency has clearly stated that the council's commitment to promoting 'reproductive health' did not include the promotion of abortion.

Likewise, the European Commission, in response to a question from a Member of the European Parliament, clarified:

"The term 'reproductive health' was defined by the United Nations (UN) in 1994 at the Cairo International Conference on Population and Development. All Member States of the Union endorsed the Programme of Action adopted at Cairo. The Union has never adopted an alternative definition of 'reproductive health' to that given in the Programme of Action, which makes no reference to abortion."

With regard to the US, only a few days prior to the Cairo Conference, the head of the US delegation, Vice President Al Gore, had stated for the record:

"Let us get a false issue off the table: the US does not seek to establish a new international right to abortion, and we do not believe that abortion should be encouraged as a method of family planning."

Some years later, the position of the US Administration in this debate was reconfirmed by US Ambassador to the UN, Ellen Sauerbrey, when she stated at a meeting of the UN Commission on the Status of Women that: "nongovernmental organizations are attempting to assert that Beijing in some way creates or contributes to the creation of an internationally recognized fundamental right to abortion". She added: "There is no fundamental right to abortion. And yet it keeps coming up largely driven by NGOs trying to hijack the term and trying to make it into a definition".

== Goals ==
According to the official ICPD release, the conference delegates achieved consensus on the following four qualitative and quantitative goals:

1. Universal education: Universal primary education in all countries by 2015. Urge countries to provide wider access to women for secondary and higher-level education as well as vocational and technical training.
2. Reduction of infant and child mortality: Countries should strive to reduce infant and under-5 child mortality rates by one-third or to 50–70 deaths per 1000 by the year 2000. By 2015 all countries should aim to achieve a rate below 35 per 1,000 live births and an under-five mortality rate below 45 per 1,000.
3. Reduction of maternal mortality: A reduction by 1/2 the 1990 levels by 2000 and 1/2 of that by 2015. Disparities in maternal mortality within countries and between geographical regions, socio-economic and ethnic groups should be narrowed.
4. Access to reproductive and sexual health services including family planning: Family-planning counseling, pre-natal care, safe delivery and post-natal care, prevention and appropriate treatment of infertility, prevention of abortion and the management of the consequences of abortion, treatment of reproductive tract infections, sexually transmitted diseases and other reproductive health conditions; and education, counseling, as appropriate, on human sexuality, reproductive health and responsible parenthood. Services regarding HIV/AIDS, breast cancer, infertility, and delivery should be made available. Active discouragement of female genital mutilation (FGM).

In addition to earlier aims, the Programme of Action set new targets:

5. Expansion of skilled delivery services: Achieve skilled attendance at ≥60 % of births in high-mortality countries and 90 % globally by 2015.

6. Empowerment of women: End gender-based discrimination and violence; promote women’s participation in political and economic life; ensure equal access to education and employment.

7. Reduction of HIV/AIDS infection: By 2010, ensure ≥95 % of 15–24 year-olds have access to condoms, voluntary testing, counseling, and follow-up, and reduce infections in this group by 25 %.

== Participants ==
- National Black Women's Reproductive Justice Agenda (1994)

== Nairobi Summit on ICPD25 ==
The 2019 Nairobi Summit on ICPD25 was held in Nairobi in November. It marks the 25th year of the International Conference on Population and Development (ICPD). The government of Kenya, Denmark and UNFPA are co-convening the summit. It is a platform for all interested in the pursuit of sexual and reproductive health and rights (SRHR) which includes duty bearers, civil society organisations (CSOs), private sector organisation, women group, youth networks, faith base organisation etc. to discuss and agree on the actions to complete the ICPD Programme of Action.

== See also ==
- Americans for UNFPA
- Commission on Population and Development
- Gita Sen
- International Union for the Scientific Study of Population
- Reproductive Health Supplies Coalition
- Reproductive justice
