= Noreen Goldman =

Demographer

- Education: New York University; Harvard University
- Scientific career
- Workplaces: Harvard T.H. Chan School of Public Health; Princeton University
- Thesis: The demography of kin (1977)

Noreen Goldman is an American social scientist who is the Hughes-Rogers Professor of Demography and Public Affairs at Princeton University. She studies social and economic factors and how they impact adult health. She was elected a Member of the National Academy of Sciences in 2024.

== Early life and education ==
Goldman studied mathematics at New York University. She moved to the Harvard T.H. Chan School of Public Health for her doctoral research, where she studied the demography of kin.

== Research and career ==
Goldman has spent her entire career at Princeton University, where she was made an Endowed Professor in 2007. Her research combines demographic and epidemiological investigations into the impact of social and economic factors on adult health. Her early work considered the impact of marital status on health and mortality, revealing that widowed men had poorer life expectancies than widowed women. Goldman analyzed the quality of data from the World Fertility Survey, which provided her with useful experience in survey design. She designed and led large-scale population surveys that investigate the causes of illness for women and children in rural communities. She created an event history calendar to understand the timelines of maternal and child health in Guatemala, and investigated the social effects of health in Taiwan. She worked with cardiologists and molecular biologists to understand the cardiac health of children born in the 1990s, revealing that Black and Hispanic patients had considerably lower Life's Essential 8 scores than their white counterparts.

During the COVID-19 pandemic, Goldman studied the changing life expectancies of different groups in the United States. She found that life expectancy of Hispanic Native Americans decreased by four years from 2019. She demonstrated that the life expectancy of African American and Latino populations reduced by 3 – 4 times that of white people, and that the pandemic would reverse ten years of progress made toward closing gaps in life expectancy. She went on to show that Filipino men had the largest decline in life expectancy of all Asian American groups.

== Awards and honors ==
- 2024 Elected Member of the National Academy of Sciences
- 2024 Honoured member of the Population Association of America

== Selected publications ==
- Y R Hu; N Goldman (1 May 1990). "Mortality differentials by marital status: an international comparison". Demography. 27 (2): 233–250. doi:10.2307/2061451. ISSN 0070-3370. JSTOR 2061451. PMID 2332088. Wikidata Q52866442.
- N. Goldman; S. Korenman; R. Weinstein (1 June 1995). "Marital status and health among the elderly". Social Science & Medicine. 40 (12): 1717–1730. doi:10.1016/0277-9536(94)00281-w. ISSN 0277-9536. PMID 7660185. Wikidata Q72023685.
- Theresa Andrasfay; Noreen Goldman (15 September 2020). "Reductions in 2020 US life expectancy due to COVID-19 and the disproportionate impact on the Black and Latino populations". bioRxiv. doi:10.1101/2020.07.12.20148387. PMID 32995806. Wikidata Q100387992.
