= Obesity and fertility =

Obesity is defined as an abnormal accumulation of body fat, usually 20% or more over an individual's ideal body weight. This is often described as a body mass index (BMI) over 30. However, BMI does not account for whether the excess weight is fat or muscle, and is not a measure of body composition. For most people, however, BMI is an indication used worldwide to estimate nutritional status. Obesity is usually the result of consuming more calories than the body needs and not expending that energy by doing exercise. There are genetic causes and hormonal disorders that cause people to gain significant amounts of weight but this is rare. People in the obese category are much more likely to develop fertility problems than people of normal healthy weight.

A report carried out by the Nurses Health Study demonstrated an increased risk of anovulation in women with an increasing BMI value. Its major effects include a reduction in ovulation rate, a decline in oocyte quality, menstrual irregularities, a decreased pregnancy rate and a rise in miscarriages. Obesity can have particularly damaging effects in young women as they begin menstruating earlier than non-obese girls, essentially enhancing the defects associated with obesity and fertility. Obesity also affects fertility in men.

== Epidemiology ==
On a global scale, there are more people who are obese than underweight. This finding occurs in every region worldwide with the exception of parts of sub-Saharan Africa and Asia.

Previously, obesity and overweight were considered problems nearly exclusive to high-income countries; however, the prevalence of these health problems is now rising in low- and middle- income countries. Moreover, obesity and overweight are health issues which are more prevalent in urban areas compared to rural areas.

Since 1975, obesity rates have tripled worldwide.

As of 2016, 1.9 billion adults (aged 18 years or older) were classified as being overweight, and within these adults, 650 million were classified as obese. This translates to 39% of adults (39% of men and 40% of women) being overweight and 13% of the adult population worldwide (11% of men and 15% of women) being obese in 2016.

An estimated 38.2 million under 5 years of age were either overweight or obese as of 2019. In Africa, the number of overweight children under 5 years of age has increased by 24% percent since 2000. Almost half of the children under 5 who were overweight or obese in 2019 lived in Asia.

In 2016, over 340 million children and adolescents from ages 5–19 were overweight or obese. 124 million children and adolescents aged 5–19 (6% of girls and 8% of boys) were obese in 2016, as compared to 1975 where obesity affected just under 1% of children and adolescents in this age range. The prevalence of obesity and overweight amongst children and adolescents in this age group has significantly risen from 4% in 1975 to just above 18% in 2016. This marked increase in the rate among children has occurred similarly in both boys and girls, reflected in the 2016 statistic where 18% of girls and 19% of boys were overweight.

24.5% of reproductive age women (age 20–44 years) are estimated to be overweight and 23.0% of reproductive age women are estimated to be obese. It has also been shown that the risk of infertility amongst obese women due to disrupted ovulation is 2.7%. For adult women who are obese and are reproductively active, each unit increase in BMI over a BMI of 32 kg/m^{2} is associated with a reduction of spontaneous conception rate by 5%.

Obesity and overweight among women of reproductive age have been associated with reduced success of conception and a higher risk of complications during pregnancy. Individuals who are obese are at an increased risk of death compared to individuals who are classified as normal weight. This increased risk persists for those who are classified as class 2 and 3 obese.

== Women ==
Higher weights have been shown to impair fertility by inhibiting reproductive hormones. Obesity disrupts normal endocrine function, leading to irregularities in ovulation, endometrial development, and embryo development. Adipocytes (fat cells) secrete proteins and signaling molecules known as adipokines. Certain adipokines have been implicated in reducing fertility in women.

=== Hormonal disruption ===
In women with non-disrupted reproduction function, they hypothalamic-pituitary-ovarian (HPO) axis facilitates proper ovulation and egg implantation. Through producing gonadotropic and steroid hormones, the HPO is responsible for follicular and oocyte development. However, the regulatory functions of the HPO can be disrupted due to the up or down regulation of certain hormones in the setting of obesity.

==== Insulin ====
One such disruptor of proper HPO function is insulin. Obesity, particularly the presence of visceral fat (fat around the abdomen), is associated with an increased risk of insulin resistance. Insulin resistance refers to cell's reduced sensitivity to insulin, leading to the reduced ability to uptake glucose from the blood and high levels of circulation insulin. The elevated blood insulin levels can disrupt gonadotropin release. Insulin has been shown to increase androgen production, leading to hyperandrogenism. These androgens are converted to estrogen which exert negative feedback on the HPO, leading to down regulation of the HPO and limiting gonadotropin production. This hyperinsulinemia and resulting hyperandrogenism have been associated with disruptions in ovulation.

Adiponectin, the protein secreted in greatest amounts from adipocytes, functions to increase the sensitivity of cells to insulin. Circulating adiponectin levels have been shown to be reduced in obese women. These reduced levels of adiponectin have also been associated with insulin resistance.

==== Leptin ====
Leptin is a satiety adipokine released from adipocytes. Normally, leptin interacts with leptin receptors (LEPRs) in the brain in order to decrease hunger and facilitate energy expenditure. In obesity, the greater number of adipocytes release greater amounts of leptin. These higher levels of leptin have been implicated in disrupted endometrial maturation and embryo implantation in to the endometrium. Leptin may also inhibit the production of certain steroids, such as progesterone, which is also necessary for proper endometrial development.

Leptin is also a product of the ob gene. Due to leptin's interaction with the hypothalamus to decrease appetite, therefore a mutation in the obese gene would result in an increased appetite, leading to obesity. Leptin has been found to be linked to the HPG axis as it can induce the release of gonadotrophin-releasing hormone (GnRH) by the hypothalamus and subsequently follicle stimulating hormone (FSH) and leutinising hormone (LH) by the anterior pituitary. Pre-pubertal individuals that lack leptin fail to reach the pubertal stage. If given leptin administratively, the mutation would be reversed and puberty resumed. Leptin is further expressed in mature follicles produced by the ovary, suggesting it plays a role in oocyte maturation, hence embryo development.

=== Inflammation and Oxidative Stress ===
Obesity has been associated with higher levels of circulating triglycerides and inflammatory markers. Pro-inflammatory adipokines secreted by adipocytes have been demonstrated to stimulate fatty acid accumulation. Fatty acids are normally stored in adipocytes as triglycerides. However, as triglycerides accumulate in adipocytes, fatty acids can deposit in other tissues. These fatty acids can create oxidative stress, disrupting the functions of mitochondria and endoplasmic reticula, leading to apoptosis. This process is known as lipotoxicity. Lipotoxicity can impair follicular development, lead to errors in meiotic divisions, and disrupt the implantation of the trophoblast in the endometrium. Lipotoxicity can further contribute to insulin resistance in the setting of an inflammatory state.

=== Polyendocrine metabolic ovarian syndrome ===
Increasing body weight is also thought to be linked to the development of polyendocrine metabolic ovarian syndrome (PMOS). PMOS is a very common endocrine disorder among women who are reproductively active with a prevalence of 5-10%. Many women who have PMOS are also obese, and it is estimated that the prevalence of obesity in women with PMOS is 35 - 63%.

PMOS diagnosis is defined by the Rotterdam criteria of having at least two of the following: polycystic ovaries, hyperandrogenism, and ovulatory dysfunction. Polycystic ovaries can be viewed by the ultrasound, and it will show multiple, small cysts in the ovaries. Some symptoms that people may experience with PMOS are irregular periods, acne, infertility, and excessive hair growth.

PMOS is associated with excess levels of male hormones (androgens) or hyperandrogenism. Studies have shown that hyperandrogenism could be caused by a reaction between ovarian theca cells and reactive oxygen species. Hyperandrogenism in women results in menstrual abnormalities, insulin resistance, and ovarian dysfunction in the body. Obesity interferes with the Hypothalamic-Pituitary-Ovarian (HPO) Axis. The HPO Axis is a tightly regulated cycle of female hormones that control female reproduction. In a female with the absence of PMOS, gonadotropin and other steroid hormone are tightly regulated for follicular development. The ovary also plays a vital role in releasing steroid hormones for follicular maturation and oocyte development. After the oocyte develops into an egg, the egg is released and implanted into the lining of the uterus (endometrium). In the absence of fertilization of a sperm, the endometrium lining will shed, and menstruation will occur in a 28-day cycle. Hyperandrogenism can disrupt this cycle and decrease follicular maturation, leading to irregular menstrual cycles (anovulatory cycles) and decreasing fertility.

Obesity in PMOS women amplifies hormonal and metabolic decline, therefore decreasing fertility and oocyte quality in women. In obese women, there is an increased level of insulin circulating the body because of the inability of the body to respond to insulin (insulin resistance). Increased insulin in the blood stimulates the ovaries to produce more androgens increasing the risk of hyperandrogenism that can interfere with the HPO Axis and result with the pathway mentioned previously. In addition, pregnant women with a history of insulin resistance caused by PMOS have an increased risk of gestational diabetes. Obese women tend to have increased abdominal fat deposits, which is correlated with reduced menstrual frequency and fertility and increased insulin resistance.

PMOS and obesity can have an effect on assisted reproductive technology (ART) outcomes. Some studies reported women undergoing in vitro fertilization (IVF) treatment tend to have smaller oocytes that can decrease their chances of a successful conception. Some studies have further indicated that even if conception is successful through ART, there is still an increase in miscarriage rates.

Currently, therapy is aimed at improving insulin resistance so that hyperinsulinemia is reduced and ovulatory features in women are improved. According to recent studies, insulin-sensitiser drugs are the main type of therapy for women with irregular cycles that want to improve their fertility, although weight loss is normally the first step in overweight women with PMOS.

=== Stigma ===
Apart from biological factors, social factors, such a stigma in health care environments, can limit care and desirable health outcomes. In health care settings, overweight and obese women experience weight-related stigma. Surveys have demonstrated that health care workers view overweight and obese individuals as more lazy, less intelligent, and more self-indulgent than individuals with smaller body sizes. These attitudes may limit overweight and obese women's ability to receive high-quality care or limit their desire to become connected to care due to disrespectful treatment by providers.

This stigma and reluctance to provide high quality care has been suggested to exacerbate problems of infertility in those who are overweight or obese. Due to the perceived biological associations between excess body fat and infertility, overweight and obese women's inability to conceive can be pre-judged by health care providers. Women who are overweight and obese report that their infertility is attributed solely to their excess body weight and that providers may be unwilling to treat infertility in women who are overweight and obese until they lose weight. Of note, no formal guidelines exist from the American Society for Reproductive Medicine or the Society for Assisted Reproductive Technology that dictate when women should receive fertility treatment based on weight.

It has also been shown that obese women have higher rates of mood disorders compared to non-obese women. Rates of mood disorders are even higher among women who are treated via in vitro fertilization (IVF) and increase further upon IVF failure. Mood disorders, as well as medications used to treat mood disorders, can exacerbate hormonal and menstrual dysfunction, worsening outcomes of infertility management.

== Men ==
Sperm count and its relationship to pregnancy rate

Numerous studies show the association between obesity in men and infertility. In the developed world, the temporal trend for the reduction in sperm parameters (sperm count, motility, morphology, volume, fructose level, and pH) reflects the increasing prevalence of obesity.

The reproductive potential of men who are obese can be attributed to changes in hormone levels which regulate spermatogenesis, increased temperatures in the testicles, the accumulation of environmental toxins in adipose tissue, and increased levels of oxidative stress as well as a higher incidence of erectile dysfunction.

=== Changes in Hormonal Levels ===
In males, the accumulation of fatty tissue is linked to a decrease in free testosterone in the serum, which has been proposed to lead to low sperm count. Obese men have lower circulating testosterone which affects sperm production known as spermatogenesis. This affects the quantity and quality of a man's sperm. Obese men have increased risk of oligozoospemia, having fewer than 15 million sperm per millilitre of semen, and far fewer motile sperm than men of lower weight. Sperm with high amounts of damaged DNA are significantly more common in obese men than in normal weight men. Ejaculate volume is also affected. Altered male hormones can also lead to erectile dysfunction which is the major cause of infertility in obese men.

=== Increased Temperatures in Testicles ===
Gonadal heat can rise with an increase in fat or adipose tissue in the scrotum. Spermatogenesis is a temperature-sensitive process with the optimal temperature for sperm production in humans ranging between 34–35 °C. Thus, obesity may contribute to altered production and parameters of sperm due to an increase of heat in the testicles. Sperm cells can be harmed due to elevated temperatures within the scrotum due to the build up of fat tissue. The damage that heat can pose on sperm production are associated with a reduction in sperm motility, an increase in sperm DNA fragmentation, and increased sperm oxidative stress.

=== Sleep Apnea ===
Sleep apnea is defined as a sleep disorder consisting of pauses of breathing or shallow and infrequent breathing during sleep. Every pause in breathing can cause hypoxia due to the lack of oxygen the body receives. Sleep apnea is more commonly found in obese people. The mechanism of correlation between sleep apnea and infertility is not clearly defined. Some studies have found that sleep apnea disrupts sleep quality decreasing the pituitary gonadal function and concentration of testosterone in the morning. Other studies report sleep apnea decreases the quality of sex and increases the likelihood of erectile dysfunction. The collection of all of these factors may contribute to the overall decrease in fertility.

=== Metabolic Syndrome ===
Metabolic syndrome is a dysfunction of energy utilization and storage. It is diagnosed based on having at least three of the following criteria: high fasting blood glucose levels, high triglyceride levels, low high density cholesterol (HDL) levels, high blood pressure, and abdominal obesity. Metabolic syndrome has been associated with harmful effects with fertility. People with metabolic syndrome can have high insulin levels (hyperinsulinemia) and high blood glucose levels (hyperglycemia ) decreasing sperm quantity and quality, which can increase infertility.

=== Environmental Toxins ===
Since adipose tissue is a potential site of toxin accumulation, it is important to view the impacts that environmental toxins pose on fertility. Research demonstrates that metals and chemicals present in air, water, food, and health/beauty products are associated with a reduction in fertility and have potential to cause infertility in males via decreasing sperm count and function. Men who consumed fruits and vegetables with high levels of pesticide residues had a lower total sperm count as well as a lower percentage of morphologically normal sperm. Moreover, a United States study which enrolled 501 participants found a significant association between infertility and blood lead levels in men. Tobacco use in the form of cigarette smoking, another common cause of toxin exposure in the air, has shown to decrease male fertility resulting in a decrease in sperm parameters such as sperm density, total sperm count, and number of motile sperm.

== Management ==
=== Female ===
Preventing or treating obesity in women has a positive effect on fertility rates. As simple as modifying lifestyle choices in order to lose weight could lead to a recovery in fertility decline. Taken into consideration firstly must be the weight of the individual before investigating further into complications surrounding fertility. Initially, treatment should proceed for obesity, then if complications still arise with infertility then progression onto ART is required. There are many other ways of reducing body fat including modifying diet or administrating diet pills, increasing energy expenditure, or surgically removing abdominal fat/surgical fitting of a gastric band in order to subside excess abdominal weight. Restoration of fertility should follow these modifications. A weight-loss study was carried out of 13 individuals over a 6-month period. 12 of the 13 previously infertile subjects restored ovulation whilst 11 subjects were able to conceive after the programme had ended. This study demonstrates weight loss to be the primary source of treatment for obesity and fertility problems before ART. A further study enhances this idea with 80% of females having regular menstrual cycles and conception rate was 29% after modifications.

==== Women with polyendocrine metabolic ovarian syndrome (PMOS) ====
Management for obese women with polyendocrine metabolic ovarian syndrome (PMOS) follows a relatively step-wise approach, but can be individualized based on the person and their unique needs.

Weight loss is normally the first option for overweight women with PMOS. Multiple studies have illustrated the marked improvement in endocrine profile, menstrual cycle, rate of ovulation, and likelihood of healthy pregnancy amongst women who have lost weight. The amount of weight lost does not need to be drastic in order for women to reap the aforementioned benefits; indeed, with even only a 5% decrease in total body weight can lead to increased insulin-sensitivity and ovulation restoration. Thus, for overweight women with anovulation and PMOS, lifestyle modifications are important, and are very often an integral part of the treatment plan to relieve PMOS symptoms. These lifestyle modifications may include increased exercise and a diverse diet composed of fruits, vegetables, low-fat products, and lean meats.

Following weight loss are insulin-sensitizing drugs. This class of drugs is the main therapy for women who experience irregular cycles, and want to improve their fertility. One example of an insulin-sensitizing drug is Metformin, which works by inhibiting the liver's production of glucose. The decrease in available glucose leads to less insulin secretion, and thereby increases insulin-sensitivity in cells. A systematic review of Metformin illustrated that it benefits women with PMOS in a myriad of ways: decreasing body insulin concentrations, lowering androgen levels, aiding in ovulation, and increasing positive reproductive outcomes.

Even for women looking to utilize medications, weight loss should be encouraged to increase the likelihood of ovulation and ovarian response. In the United Kingdom, weight loss is advised for overweight women with PMOS, preferably to a body mass index of less than 30, before initiating drugs for ovarian stimulation. Another study on Metformin is more lenient, and suggests that women with obesity and PMOS should defer treatment with Metformin until achieving a body mass index of 35 or less. Treatment monitoring is more difficult in obese women because the ovaries become more difficult to see on ultrasound scans, potentially leading to oversight of multiple ovulations and pregnancies. Additionally, drugs like Metformin may be less effective in women with anovulation and extreme obesity, although this situation may simply justify a higher dose to be efficacious.

Bariatric surgery - procedures that target the stomach and intestines for weight loss - is another option for obese women with PMOS. A small study of 17 women with PMOS revealed that a vast majority improved upon undergoing either biliopancreatic diversion or laparoscopic bypass. Additionally, other metabolic parameters - including insulin sensitivity and blood pressure - also improved in these women.

=== Male ===
Obesity in males leads to negative repercussions in fertility, sperm function, and overall health of the offspring. Fortunately, the effects of obesity on male fertility can be reversed, with either weight loss or testosterone therapy.

Losing weight has been shown to yield numerous beneficial results; doing so can alter misaligned BMI statuses, and can correct metabolic disturbances associated with increased weight, ultimately decreasing the amount of oxidative stress and DNA damage. There is currently limited evidence for the effect of weight loss on semen-associated factors. Weight loss can be achieved through lifestyle modifications, which include options like a reduced caloric diet, regular exercise, and quitting smoking. In a randomized control trial of obese men, it was observed that increased physical activity and reduced caloric intake led to improvement in erectile dysfunction.

Bariatric surgery is another option to improve sexual function in overweight men. In a randomized trial, bariatric surgery reduced BMI significantly more than lifestyle modifications, and ultimately led to a reversal in both erectile dysfunction and hypogonadism.

Testosterone therapy may improve hormone imbalances and treat erectile dysfunction. While nearly two-thirds of urologists indicated that they used empirical testosterone therapy for idiopathic male infertility, the efficacy of these agents remains controversial, with particular concerns about the cardiovascular safety profile. Aromatase inhibitors - such as Letrozole - can be used in place of testosterone to overcome reduced testosterone levels commonly found in obese men. However, aromatase inhibitors are not without their own risks as well; there are concerns surrounding long-term aromatase inhibitor therapy due to its effect on bone health.

== Animals ==
=== Cattle ===
It is common practise for body condition scoring to be used in domesticated animals to assess the fatness of an animal and is often used by vets and livestock handlers to determine whether the animal need more or less energy. Both a low and a high score can reduce an animal's fertility.

Cattle that are over-conditioned are also more insulin resistant compared to their leaner counterparts. As demonstrated in mice, insulin resistance is a factor in poor fertility as it has an effect on oocyte development. This in turn means that less oocytes are suitable for fertilisation and fertility is impaired.

Another reason for decrease in fertility is to do with leptin. Leptin is a hormone which production is increased in obese animals. In cows, leptin can inhibit thecal cells from producing adrostenediol and progesterone. Androstenediol is important in fertility as it is the precursor to oestrogen. Without oestrogen production, the balance of hormones is affected and there is no LH surge which is required for ovulation.

=== Domestic Fowl ===
Domestic fowl has previously been researched on and it was found that by over feeding but not force feeding the male birds, there was no effect on fertility. However, more recently a study has shown that obesity induced by force feeding can affect the number of spermatozoa and their motility in the male birds. It was also found that in two of the three birds, there was a decrease in testosterone and an increase in LH which suggests the pathway of why there might be reduced spermatozoa.
