= Université de Thiès =

Public university in Senegal

Coordinates: 14.7752°N 16.8787°W

- Type: Public
- Established: 2007; 19 years ago
- Location: Thies, Senegal
- Website: http://www.univ-thies.sn/

Université de Thiès (UT - University of Thiès) is located in Thiès, Senegal. It was founded in 2007.

== See also ==
- List of universities in Senegal
- Education in Senegal
