= Kathleen Harris =

American sociologist

Kathleen Mullan Harris (born October 13, 1950) is a distinguished professor of sociology from the University of North Carolina at Chapel Hill and a faculty fellow at the Carolina Population Center.

== Education and career ==
She received a bachelor's degree in computer science at Pennsylvania State University in 1972. Then, she went on to receive a masters of arts and a doctorate in demography from the University of Pennsylvania in 1979 and 1988 respectively. Through her career as a sociologist, she specialized in research on social inequality based on family, poverty, and health.

Harris became the director and principal investigator of the National Longitudinal Study of Adolescent to Adult Health (Add Health) where she led a team to follow the lives of 20,000 teens till adulthood to determine correlations between social inequality and health. Due to her work offering a greater insight on the effects of nature and nurture on the social development of teenagers using the life course perspective, Harris was elected to become a member of the U.S. National Academy of Sciences in 2014.

== Awards and honors ==
Harris was awarded the Clifford C. Clogg award for early career achievement in population studies and demography from the Population Association of America and Research Institute of Pennsylvania State University in 2004. Harris later became the elected president of the Population Association of America in 2008. Afterwards, Harris received the Warren E. Miller award for meritorious service to the social sciences, which she was recognized for her work's impact to the field of social science in 2013. Shortly after, Harris was elected as a member of the U.S. National Academy of Sciences in 2014. Harris received the Golden Goose award from the US Congress in 2016. She was an American Academy of Arts and Sciences fellow of 2019.
