= International Union for the Scientific Study of Population =

Research organization

International Union for the Scientific Study of Population is an international union for the study of human population, which was founded in 1928. In 2025, the union received the United Nations Population Award in the institutional category.
