= Age segregation =

Separation of people based on age

Age segregation is the separation of people based on their age, and may be observed in many aspects of some societies. Examples of institutionalized age segregation include age segregation in schools, and age-segregated housing. There are studies of informal age segregation among adolescents. Age segregation in schools, age grading, or graded education is the separation of students into years of education (grades, forms) by approximately the same age.

In the United States, graded education was introduced during 1848 to 1870. Age segregation in the U.S. was a product of industrialization, Western formal schooling, child labor laws, social services agencies, and the rise of disciplines such as psychology and education. A combination of these caused a shift from family working as a unit to separation of economic activities and childcare emerged. Some communities have different cultural practices and integrate children into mature activities of the family and community. This is common among Indigenous American communities.

Age segregation is seen by some like Peter Uhlenberg and Jenny Gierveld to benefit individuals by bringing like-minded individuals together to share similar facilities, network and information. The elderly are however disadvantaged by segregation in that they risk being excluded from economic and social developments.

== Effects of age segregation ==
Researchers have argued that age grading in school has significant impact on age segregation among adolescent peer groups. It is also present in the work force, which can make it more difficult for older adults to find jobs or change employment paths because of their age. They are often either expected to have a significantly larger background of experience in the field, or be far enough away from retirement to be considered. Although seen less in younger adults and children, there is evidence that younger populations segregate within themselves. Until around ages 7 and 8, children tend to only associate with people within 2 years of their own age. Children mostly segregate from adults, showing less adult interaction as they move into their teenage and young adult years. Studies suggest that the gap in age segregation will grow because of technological knowledge seen in younger adults that is not seen in older adults. It is predicted that younger adults will have to teach older adults about new social environments that will be essential to healthy living. Without these teachings, age segregation is set to increase.

Some of the prospects for designing social life to overcome the entrenched practices of age segregation and the cultural assumptions through the life course is through a steady flock of opportunities for cross-age interaction, some settings facilitate age-integrated social relations. The most distinguished example is the family, in which children, parents, and grandparents frequently develop close cross-age relationships. Age relations within families vary across cultures and subcultures. According to Uhlenberg and Gierveld, many lower class black families in the United States have high levels of interaction with kin, and older adults. This often provides significant care for younger members in the neighborhood.

== By continent ==
=== Asia ===
A statistical analysis of survey data of 390 elderly people living in studio apartments in Singapore found that age-segregation has a negative impact on the quality of life of elderly people. The study also found that the perception of the elderly in relation to factors that are most important to their quality of life is at variance with that of policy makers.

No kid zones are places in South Korea that prohibit children from being on the premises. No kid zones may be enforced by public venues and private businesses. These businesses are not limited to those intended to only serve adult customers such as bars; no kid zones are frequently coffeehouses, restaurants, and movie theatres. The National Library of Korea is a no kid zone and prevents children under the age of 16 from entering unless they apply for entry. Children under this age may instead go to the National Library for Children and Young Adults. There are a number of reported reasons for enacting no kid zones. In a 2023 survey, the most commonly given reason (68% of respondents) was fear of legal liability if a child was injured. Some businesses enact such zones to avoid disturbing adult patrons. Other businesses may restrict customers of other ages such as teenagers or seniors. Exclusionary policies may also be enforced by businesses based on gender, relationship status, or occupation.

=== Europe ===
Some sections on airplanes may be prohibited to children under the age of 16. Tickets for these adult-only zones are more expensive. Corendon, a Turkish airline that offers such seating on certain flights, places families with children at the back of the plane.

Some hotels in Europe, particularly in Germany, prohibit children. Approximately 500 adult-only hotels have been identified. Portugal prohibits these exclusionary policies by law but many hotels still enforce them.

Betting shops in the United Kingdom and Ireland prohibit children under 18 on their premises.

=== North America ===
In the United States some portions of a person's life involves being with the same age cohort. Industrialization brought an increased specialization of all kinds, and age was an important category used to sort people. Society expected teachers to be experts on a particular age group, family members to specialize in different kinds of work, and people to move through major life roles in a fixed pattern. The work force involvement of older women and men declined, and it was replaced by leisure retirement. Martin Kohli argues that over the length of the twentieth century, age was enormously used to assign people to or prohibit them from particular activities. The result was a tendency toward a firmly fixed life course. According to Riley and Riley, this tendency toward age-segregated structures began to approximate the age-differentiated "ideal type" structure in which people gain their education when young, work in middle-age, and enjoy their well-earned leisure time when they are old. Age-based grades, teams, jobs, and leisure activities seemed normal; people were expected to spend major portions of their days and lives with people of their own age.

In a 2010 article for Perspectives on Psychological Science, authors Rogoff et al. state that age-segregated housing can hold some advantages for the elderly such as a higher chance of having more things in common with their peers. This segregation can also decrease their involvement with societies that are preoccupied with the desirability of youth and give them the ability to discuss their fears of death and the frequent deaths of others. Some retirement villages are heavily secured, which can give the elders a sense of safety and protection. An older person is more likely to be noticed in an age segregated community if he or she is in need of help. The elderly people living in such a community also receive lower rates because of the quantity of similar goods and services needed by their communities. Some of the disadvantages of age-segregated housing are isolation from mainstream society, preventing older people from sharing wisdom and experiences with younger people and leading old people to have restricted sets of friendships and neighbors. In some elderly people age-segregated housing can contribute to low morale and feelings of uselessness and rejection.

Hotels in the United States are legally allowed to prohibit children but rarely do so. Adult-only venues are often resort hotels or small inns. American hotels are more likely to encourage families with children to stay in certain areas instead of excluding them outright.

== See also ==
- Age verification
- Childism
