= No kid zone =

Places banning children in South Korea

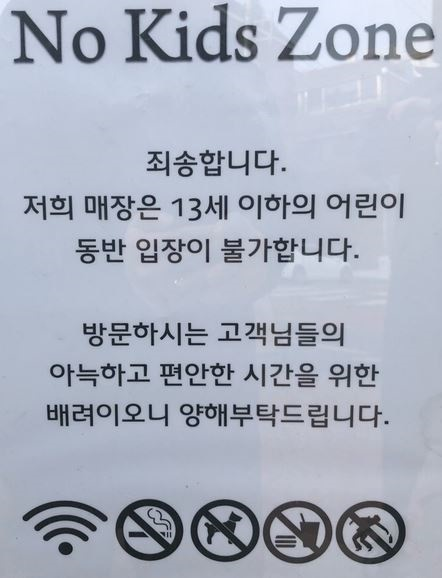
A no kid zone sign at a cafe in South Korea, prohibiting entry to children under 13

No kid zones (Korean: 노키즈존) are places in South Korea that prohibit children from being on the premises. No kid zones may be enforced by public venues and private businesses. First becoming common in the early 2010s, no kid zones are commonly established to protect businesses from legal liability, but they may also be used to prevent children from disturbing adults. Places that are commonly designated as no kid zones include coffeehouses, restaurants, and movie theatres as well as national landmarks such as the National Library of Korea. They are most common on Jeju Island.

The use of no kid zones is debated. Proponents argue that businesses have a right to exclude children, while opponents consider them discriminatory toward children, mothers and fathers. The National Human Rights Commission of Korea described them as discriminatory in a 2017 decision. Some businesses designate themselves as Kids OK Zones to indicate that children are allowed on the premises.

== Practice ==
Such zones began to proliferate in the early 2010s. Around this time, a number of court rulings held businesses at least partially responsible after children were injured on the premises. For example, in 2013, a business was held liable after a 10-year-old child bumped into a store employee carrying hot water, which resulted in the child being burned. According to the Jeju Research Institute, there are 542 no kid zones. A service offered by Google Maps depicts 451 such zones. Jeju Island, a well-known tourist destination, has the highest amount of these areas. No kid zones are not areas that are normally off-limits to children such as bars or casinos; but they are frequently coffeehouses, restaurants, and movie theatres. The National Library of Korea is a no kid zone and prevents children under the age of 16 from entering unless they apply for entry. Children under this age may instead go to the National Library for Children and Young Adults. In 2020, the Korea National Arboretum was reported to be a no kids zone. Areas prohibited to children may be marked with signage or by staff telling parents that children cannot be present on the premises. Businesses that allow children in Seoul may market themselves as a Kids OK Zone, a designation that is regulated by the Happy Parenting Division. There are 504 of these zones, most of which are restaurants.

== Reception ==
In 2023 survey of 1,000 South Korean adults conducted by a private research group, 61.9% supported the implementation of no kid zones. Of married couples with children, 53.6% supported the implementation. 70% of surveyed respondents believed that no kid zones were not discriminatory as long as other venues accepted parents with children. There are a number of reported reasons for enacting no kid zones. In a 2023 survey, the most commonly given reason (68% of respondents) was fear of legal liability if a child was injured. Some businesses enact such zones to avoid disturbing adult patrons. Other businesses may restrict customers of other ages such as teenagers or seniors. Exclusionary policies may also be enforced by businesses based on gender, relationship status, or occupation.

No kid zones are controversial in South Korea. Some view the zones as discriminatory and inconvenient towards parents and children while others argue they are within the rights of business owners to enact. Women that fail to control their disruptive children are sometimes called "mom-choong", a pejorative term meaning "mom-roaches". The country has a low fertility rate and a greying population; some argue these zones exacerbate these issues. Yong Hye-in, a member of South Korea's National Assembly, advocates against no kid zones. She was denied entry to a cafe as a new mother and felt like she had been "expelled from society". She also believes that no kid zones contribute to cultural specific challenges faced by new parents in South Korea. In 2023, Hye-in held a press conference where she made a speech about no kid zones and brought her toddler. John Wall, a professor at Rutgers University, believes that businesses should prohibit disruptive behavior instead of children and that no kid zones "protect a supposed right of adults not to have to associate with [children]." Ann Marie Murnaghan, a professor at York University, believes that the zones constitute childism. Kim Ji-hak, a member of Diversity Korea, believes that exclusionary zones based on age or other characteristics are "clearly discriminatory by definition".

== Legal implications ==
A 2017 decision by the National Human Rights Commission of Korea ruled that no kid zones were discriminatory, but this did not legally restrict them from existing. The decision concluded that no kid zones conflict with a child's right to equality under the constitution and the United Nations' Convention on the Rights of the Child.

A number of local governments and politicians have proposed various pieces of legislation that aim to restrict such zones. In May 2023, Jeju Island proposed an ordinance that would prohibit businesses from enacting no kid zones, although one reporter expressed skepticism that it would be enacted.

== See also ==
- Ageism – Discrimination due to age
- Children's rights – Human rights of children
- Public sphere – Area in social life with political ramifications
- Voluntary childlessness – Lifestyle choice
- Betting shop
- LGBT-free zone
