= Paul Demeny =

Hungarian demographer and economist (1932–2024)

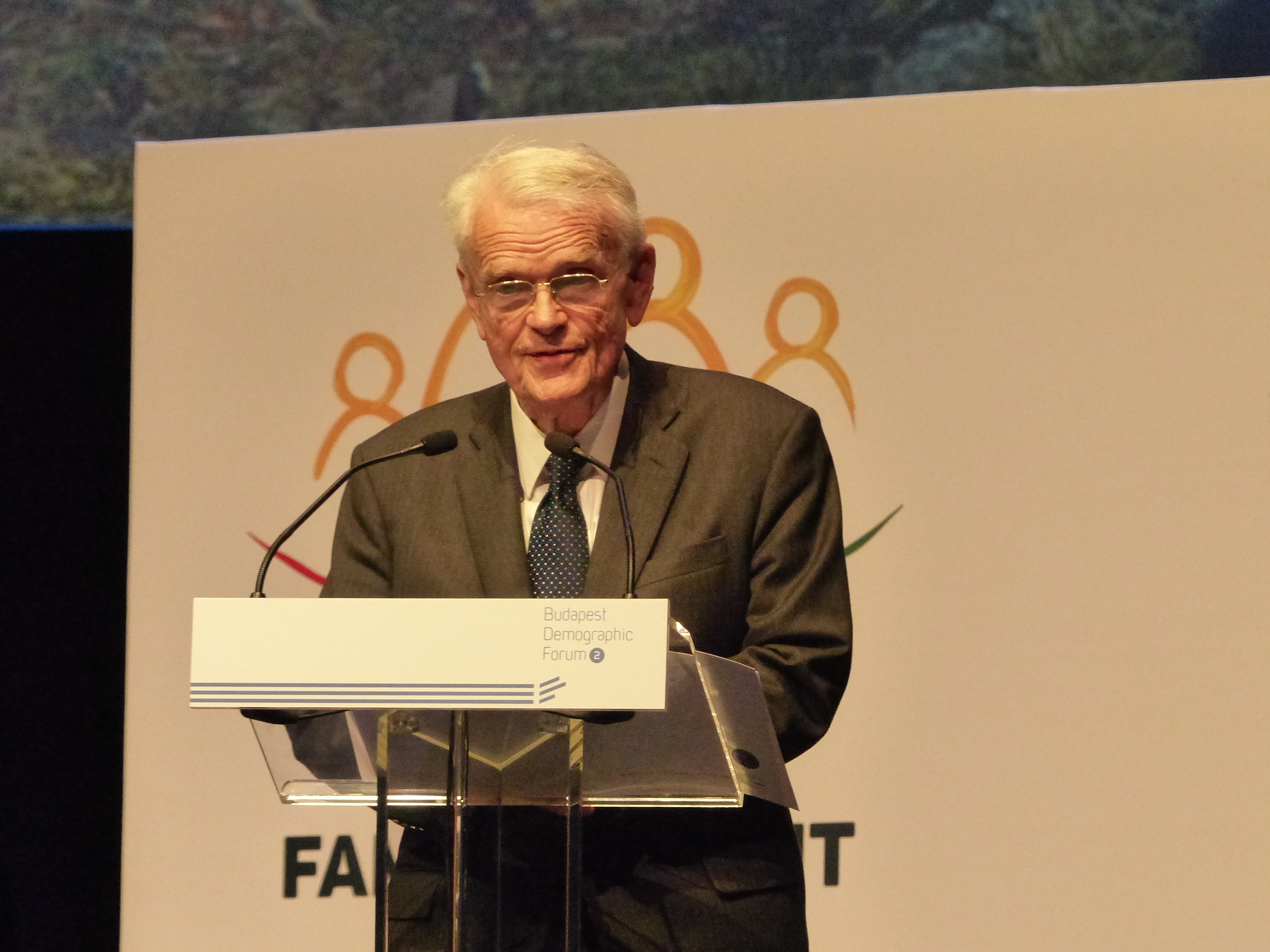
Demény in 2017

Paul Demeny (1932 – 18 October 2024) was a Hungarian demographer and economist known for pioneering the concept of Demeny voting.

== Early life and education ==
Demeny was born in Nyíregyháza, Hungary in 1932. He graduated from the Reformed College of Debrecen in 1951 and from the University of Budapest in 1955. He then attended the Graduate Institute of International Studies in Geneva in 1957. He eventually received a PhD in economics from Princeton University in 1961. At Princeton, his mentors were demographers Frank W. Notestein and Ansley J. Coale, as well as economists William Baumol, Oscar Morgenstern and Jacob Viner.

== Career ==
Demeny was appointed assistant professor of economics at Princeton University in 1961, and as research associate at Princeton's Office of Population Research, a research center. In 1966, he moved to the University of Michigan and in 1969 to the University of Hawaii. In 1973, he joined the Population Council, a U.S.-based non-profit, as vice president and director of its Demographic Division. There, he founded the Population and Development Review, a quarterly peer-reviewed academic journal.

Demeny is known for introducing the idea of Demeny voting in 1986. Demeny voting is a system that would "let custodial parents exercise the children's voting rights," with the goal of "mak(ing) the political system more responsive to the young generation's interests" and addressing the threat of gerontocracy.

== Death ==
Demeny died on 18 October 2024, at the age of 91.

== Recognition ==
In 2003, he was named laureate of the International Union for the Scientific Study of Population. In 2018, he was awarded the Hungarian Order of St. Stephen.
