= Demény =

Demény is a Hungarian surname. Notable people with the surname include:

- Attila Demény (1955–2021), Hungarian-Romanian composer and theatre director
- János Demény (1915–1993), Hungarian musicologist, Béla Bartók specialist
- László Demény (born 1953), Hungarian fencer
- Paul Demeny (Pál Demény; 1932–2024), Hungarian demographer and economist

== See also ==
- Georges Demenÿ (1850–1917), French inventor, chronophotographer and filmmaker
- Demeny voting, named after Paul Demeny
