= National Digital Library of Korea =

Public library in Seoul, South Korea

National Digital Library of Korea (Dibrary)
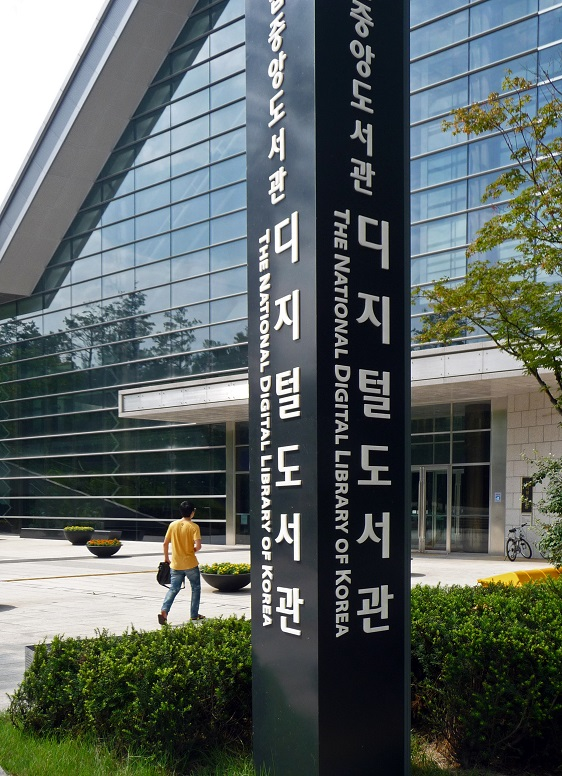
- Location: Banpo-dong, Seocho District, Seoul, South Korea
- Established: 2009 (17 years ago)

Access and use
- Circulation: Digital
- Population served: all citizen (age of over 16)

Other information
- Director: Lim Wonsun, Chief Executive
- Website: National Library of Korea

The National Digital Library of Korea is located on Banpo-ro in Seocho District, Seoul. It is also known as a "dibrary" (Korean: 디브러리), a Konglish word combining "digital" and "library." It was opened in May 2009 after seven years of construction starting in 2002. The budget for the library was 115,200,000,000 Won, which is roughly 102 million USD. The size of the library is 38,013.39 square meters, containing 5 underground floors and 3 ground floors. These floors included space for the collection and user services of digital resources, offices, books, and parking lots. Facilities allow access to over 800 libraries and other institutions around the world, including from the U.S. Library of Congress, and a total of more than 264 million pieces of content. The TV studio and user-created content (UCC) studio contain camcorders and lighting facilities, allowing users to produce, edit and display their own UCC sounds and images. Access is available to foreigners.

== History ==
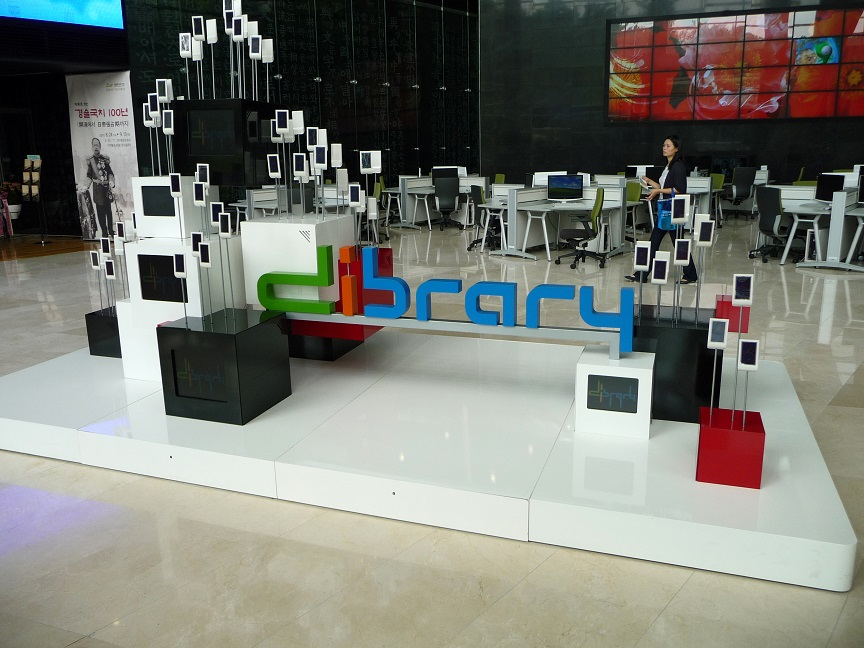
Dibrary digital monument

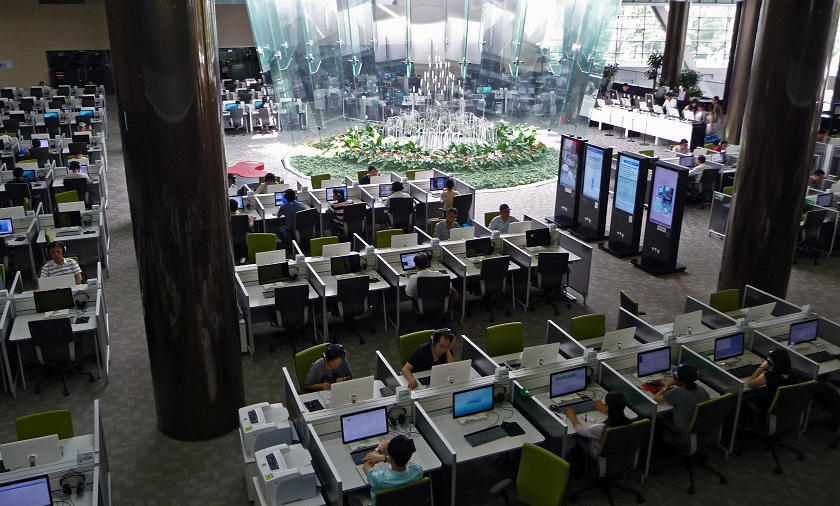
Main floor

- October 1945 - Library was first opened with the name National Library in Sodong-dong, Joong-gu, Seoul.
- October 1963 - The National Library in Sodong-dong became the National Library of Korea via the Library Act.
- March 1965 - Legal Deposit was implemented.
- December 1974 - The main building was moved to a new building in the Namsan area of Seoul.
- September 1981 - Branch Library moved to Yeoksam-dong, Gangnam District, Seoul.
- June 1983 - Librarian education and training began.
- May 1988 - Library was moved to the newly constructed building in Banpo-dong, Seocho District, Seoul.
- August 1990 - ISBN/ISSN system put in place.
- April 1991 - Library Promotion Act was enacted. Affliction of the library changed from the Ministry of Culture and Education to just the Ministry of Culture.
- November 1997 - Digital Library Pilot System was developed.
- October 1999 - KOLIS (Korean Library and Information System) was implemented.
- August 2000 - Depository building was completed* June 2001 - KOLIS-NET website was launched.
- September 2001 - Branch Library served as Dissertation Service Library.
- July 2002 - CIP (Cataloging in Publication) project started.
- December 2002 - The National Library of Korea Subject Headings was developed.
- June 2006 - The National Library for Children & Young Adults was opened.
- May 2007 - The Korea Research Institute for Library and Information and the National Library Support Center for the Disabled was established.
- November 2008 - The International Federation of Library Association and Institutions (IFLA) and Preservation and Conservation (PAC) Korea Center was established in the NLK.
- May 2009 - National Digital Library opened and Dibrary Portal was launched.
- October 2009 - Information Center on North Korea by the Ministry of Unification reopened in the NLK.
- February 2010 - International Cooperation & Public Relations Team was created.
- February 2010 - Bureau of National Bibliographic Information Center was created.
- May 2010 - Mobile Web Service for Digital Collection was launched.
- April 2012 - Bibliographic Control Division was created.
- August 2012 - The National Library for Individuals with Disabilities opened.
- December 2013 - The National Library of Korea, Sejong opened.
- October 2014 - Modern Literature Information Center and Modern Literature Information Room opened.
- March 2015 - The integrated website was reconstructed.
- May 2015 - The number of books held reached 10 million.
- February 2016 - Operation of the International Standard Name Identifier (ISNI) system began.
- March 2016 - The exhibition room in the main building reopened.
- February 2017 - Memory Museum opened.

== Awards ==
The National Digital Library of Korea has won multiple awards for its architecture, such as the Korea Green Architecture Award 2012, and the Seoul Architecture Award 2009.

== Opening Hours ==
Open:

Monday - Sunday : 9:00 to 16:00

Closed:

Main Building : Every Monday (April 2017 to November 2018)

Digital Library : Every 2nd and 4th Monday of the month

== Tours ==
The National Digital Library of Korea offers multiple types for tours for institutions, groups or individuals, library staff, students, general public, and foreigners.

Available tours are:

- History of the National Library of Korea
- How to Use the National Library of Korea
- Watching a PR Video on the National Library of Korea (For Group tours only)
- Main Building Tour
- Digital Library Tour

Tour hours are from Monday to Friday at 10:00 am, 2:00 pm. and 4:00 pm. Sunday tours are only available on the second Sunday of each month, at 2:00 pm and 4:00 pm. The number of people in each tour is limited to 20, and reservations cannot be made once that limit is reached. Reservations are made online at least one week prior to tour date, with the exception of at least three days for Sunday tours.

== Resources ==
- Main Building Guide
- Digital Library Building Guide
- Nation Library Brochure
- Memory Museum Leaflet

== Public transport connection ==
The library is served by Seoul Subway Line 2, Seocho Station, exit 6. Walk straight out of the exit; library is on the left.

== See also ==
- National Library of Korea
- National Library for Children and Young Adults
