= Bill Brass =

Scottish demographer (1921–1999)

William Brass CBE FBA (5 September 1921 – 11 November 1999) was a Scottish demographer. He developed indirect methods for estimating mortality and fertility in populations with inaccurate or incomplete data, often dubbed "Brass methods" after him.

== Early life and education ==
Brass was born in Edinburgh, where he went to school at the Royal High School and earned a Master's degree in mathematics and natural philosophy from the University of Edinburgh in 1947; during the Second World War he served in the Royal Navy Scientific Service.

== Career ==
Brass's career as a demographer began in 1948 when he worked as a statistician, then as deputy director, for the East African Statistical Department in Nairobi, which collected and analysed data on Kenya, Uganda, Tanganyika and Zanzibar. During his time there, the department conducted the first comprehensive census in East Africa, and Brass designed and analysed the East African Medical Survey.

From 1955 to 1964 he was a lecturer in statistics at the University of Aberdeen; he was promoted to Senior Lecturer in 1963. He spent a sabbatical year at Princeton University, where he worked with Ansley J. Coale and others at the Office of Population Research on methods for overcoming the unsatisfactory demographic data for Africa, leading to The Demography of Tropical Africa, published in 1968.

From 1965 until retiring in 1988, he was Reader in Medical Demography and then Professor at the London School of Hygiene & Tropical Medicine; the first demographer there, he established the Centre for Population Studies, established a master's course in medical demography and taught many of its courses, headed the Department of Medical Statistics and Epidemiology from 1977 to 1981 and was chairman of the division from 1981 to 1985.

In retirement he spent time working at the Netherlands Institute for Advanced Study and the Australian National University, and chaired the working group on Kenya for the Committee on Population and Demography of the US National Academy of Sciences.

== Research contributions ==
Beginning with his work in East Africa, Brass developed what he called indirect estimation, techniques for deriving statistics on fertility, mortality and population growth from imperfect and incomplete data, including devising and working from simple questions such as the number of living children and living parents a respondent has. These form the basis of modern estimates of world population growth and are informally called "Brass methods", "Brass techniques" or "Brass estimates" after him.

He also worked on population modelling and on British demography, for example analysing the role of female employment and predicting that the high birth rate amongst immigrants in the 1970s would not continue.

== Selected publications ==
- 1953. "The derivation of fertility and reproduction rates from restricted data on reproductive histories," Population Studies, 2: 137-166.
- 1954. "The estimation of fertility rates from ratios of total to first births," Population Studies, 8: 1: 74-87.
- 1961. "The construction of life tables from child survivorship ratios," Paper presented to the International Population Conference, New York, New York.
- 1964. "Uses of census or survey data for the estimation of vital rates," paper presented to the African Seminar on Vital Statistics: Addis Ababa, December.
- 1968. The Demography of Tropical Africa. William Brass, Ansley J. Coale, Paul Demeny, John F. Heisel, Frank Lorimer, Anatol Romaniuk, and Etienne Van de Walle. Under sponsorship of Office of Population Research, Princeton University. Princeton University Press, Princeton NJ.
- 1971. "On the scale of mortality," in Biological Aspects of Demography, ed. William Brass.
- 1973. "Estimating mortality from orphanhood," International Population Conference, Liege 1973, 3, pp. 111–123.
- 1975. Methods of Estimating Fertility and Mortality from Limited and Defective Data. Chapel Hill, North Carolina.
- 1981. "The use of the Gompertz relational model to estimate fertility," International Population Conference, Manila: 345-362.
- 1983. Manual X: Indirect Techniques for Demographic Estimation. United Nations, Dept. of International Economic and Social Affairs, Population Studies, No. 81 ST/ESA/SER.A/81. United Nations: New York, U.S.A.
- 1983. "Censored cohort progression ratios from birth histories," W. Brass and F. Juarez. Asia and Pacific Census Forum, 10: 1.
- 1983. "A reducible four-parameter system of model life tables," D. C. Ewbank, J. C. Gomez de Leon, and M. A. Stoto, Population Studies 37, 1, pp. 105–27.
- 1984. "Childhood mortality estimated from reports on previous births given by mothers at the time of a maternity," W. Brass and S. Macrae, in 'I. Preceding Birth Techniques,' Asian and Pacific Census Forum, 11:2.
- 1985. "Advances in Methods for Estimating Fertility and Mortality from Limited and Defective Data," an occasional publication of the Centre for Population Studies, London School of Hygiene and Tropical Medicine.
- 1992. "Evaluation of the reliability of data in maternity histories," W. Brass and H. Rashad, in Analysis of Maternity Histories, ed. Allan G. Hill and W. Brass. Ordina Editions, Liege, 1992, pp. 153–182.
- 1993. "Population Dynamics of Kenya," W. Brass and C. Jolly, Washington, D.C.
- 1999. "The estimation of infant mortality from proportions dying among recent births," William Brass and J. Blacker, CPS Research Paper 99-1, London School of Hygiene and Tropical Medicine.

== Honours ==
1978: The Population Association of America gave him the C. Mindel Sheps Award for contributions to mathematical and applied demography.

1979: Elected a Fellow of the British Academy. Served on its Council in 1985-88.

1981 Birthday Honours: Appointed a Commander of the Order of the British Empire (CBE).

1984: Brass was a member of the Committee on Population and Demography of the US National Academy of Sciences. In 1984, he was elected a foreign associate of the U.S. Academy. This is the highest honour for which a foreigner is eligible.

1985: Elected to four-year term as president of the International Union for the Scientific Study of Population.

After Brass's death, a memorial volume of essays in medical demography titled Brass Tacks was published.

== Personal life and death ==
Brass married Betty Topp in 1948; they had two daughters. He was incapacitated by a stroke in January 1997 until his death at Chalfont St Peter, Buckinghamshire, in November 1999.
