= Yu hyogong seonhaengnok =

Korean novel

Yuhyogong seonhaengnok (Korean: 유효공선행록; Hanja: 柳孝公善行錄; lit. The Story about the Good Deeds of Hyogong Yu Yeon) tells the story of conflicts between parents and children as well as brothers and sisters and focus on the true filial piety and love between family members through the resolution of those conflicts. It emphasizes the familiar harmony, filial piety, and brotherly love. It seems to have been written and read before the early 18th century as a prequel to Yussi samdaerok (劉氏三代錄 The Story of Three Generations of the Yu Family).

== Authorship ==
Yuhyogong seonhaengnok is estimated to have been written before the early 18th century by an anonymous author. As there are records of Yussisamdaerok in Yeolha ilgi (熱河日記 The Jehol Diary) written by Bak Jiwon (朴趾源, 1737–1805) and also in Hanjungnok (閑中錄 A Record of Sorrowful Days) written by Lady Hyegyeong (惠慶宮 洪氏, 1735–1815), Yuhyogong seonhaengnok was also assumed to have been written before the early to mid-18th century. Recently, a discovery of a section of Jemangsilmyomun (祭亡室墓文 A Funeral Oration to Dead Wife) written by Yu Sukgi (兪肅基, 1696–1752) was made in which the author mourned for his dead wife, mentioning the characters of Yussisamdaerok, allowing scholars to slightly narrow down the time in which Yuhyogong seonhaengnok was written to early 18th century or earlier.

== Plot ==
There was a man named Yu Jeonggyeong, who lived in Ming China. He had two sons named Yu Yeon and Yu Hong. Yeon was a generous man and a dutiful son, but Hong was sly and prone to jealousy. When a conflict arises between Yeon and Hong due to a lawsuit handled by Yu Jeonggyeong, Yu makes a poor judgment and sides with Hong. Hong slanders his older brother, saying that Yeon takes bribes, tries to destroy Yeon's marriage, and lies about how Yeon resents their father. Hearing all of this, Yu Jeonggyeong tries to name his younger son Hong as the rightful heir, and Yeon tries to cover for his father's flaws by pretending to be insane.

Later on, Yeon passes the civil service examination with the highest grade and becomes a teacher to the crowned prince. However, he soon falls ill. Yeon's wife Jeong was kicked out and had to return to her family home due to Hong's machinations, but instead of remarrying she runs away from home disguised as a man. When the emperor deposes the empress and avoids seeing the crown prince out of his infatuation with Concubine Mangwibi, Yeon admonishes the emperor's actions and is exiled. While in exile, Yeon reunites with his wife who is dying. However, Hong spies on his older brother and tells their father about the two of them, and Yeon and his wife are separated once again. Around this time, the crown prince succeeds the throne and punishes Mangwibi and Yu Hong's evil deeds. Yeon is reinstated as a government official.

Yu Yeon worries about his younger brother Hong who has been exiled. He adopts Hong's eldest son Yu Baekgyeong as his son and heir, loving him more than his own. Moved by Yeon's brotherly love, the emperor frees Yu Hong from exile. Hong repents his terrible deeds and reconciles with his older brother, and peace finally settles on the Yu family, which prospers and flourishes.

== Features and significance ==
Conflicts between father and son and brothers are at the heart of Yuhyogong seonhaengnok, and conflicts between brothers grow into conflicts between father and son. The younger brother's inferiority complex and jealousy of his older brother spurs a conflict between the brothers, which grows into a conflict between father and son, but the conflicts are resolved by the older brother's filial piety and brotherly love toward his father and younger brother. This story is similar to the stories of the good deeds of Yu Shun (虞舜) who faced several near-death situations due to his ruthless father and jealous stepbrother. Yu Shun refers to Emperor Shun. Because of his filial piety, he was able to marry the two daughters of Emperor Yao. He edified the people and gained the confidence of Emperor Yao. However, Shun's father tried to punish and even kill him for the smallest mistakes Shun made. For instance, he told Shun to repair the storage and then set it on fire. He also told him Shun to dig a well and then tried to bury him alive in the well. Shun's stepbrother also tried to kill Shun and take his two wives for himself. Yet every time Shun simply cried to the heavens and performed his duties as a son and brother. Due to this similarity between Emperor Shun and Yu Yeon in Yuhyogong seonhaengnok, Emperor Shun is often mentioned when discussing Yu Yeon.

Yuhyogong seonhaengnok is also considered a work that provides a variety of interpretations of filial piety, brotherly love, and clan rules. Through a male-centric narrative that eliminates all conflicts that occur between women in the family, the author focuses on the issue of filial piety and brotherly love. As a result, some described the general significance of this work as an expression of the Korean gentry's efforts to reinforce the concept of filial piety or as a process of establishing the paternal rights through conflicts that occur in family succession. Also, the concepts of brotherly love and filial piety create problems within the family but help restore and maintain the family's reputation and prosperity. The resolution of the conflicts based on filial piety and brotherly love in Yuhyogong seonhaengnok provided a foundation for the Yu Family in Yussisamdaerok. In addition, Yuhyogong seonhaengnok is significant as a novel written in hangeul relatively earlier in the Joseon dynasty.

== Text ==
There are over 10 handwritten editions of Yuhyogong seonhaengnok, including the ones housed at the National Library of Korea, Harvard University, Kyujanggak Institute for Korean Studies at the Seoul National University, and other privately owned editions. There is not a lot of difference in the plot between the different editions. The 12 chapter and 12 volume edition housed at Kyujanggak Institute is one of the representative editions, and every volume consists of about 80 pages, 10 lines per page, and 17 to 20 characters per line. Yuhyogong seonhaengnok is considered a prequel to Yussisamdaerok.
