= Notestein =

Notestein is a surname. Notable people with the surname include:

- Barbara Notestein (born 1949), American social worker and politician
- Frank W. Notestein (1902–1983), American demographer
- Wallace Notestein (1878–1969), American historian
