= Giant infant =

Chinese term for an immature adult

- Chinese: 巨婴 or 巨嬰
- Exact meaning: A "grown-up infant"
- Origin: A Country of Giant Infants

Giant infant, (simplified Chinese: 巨婴; traditional Chinese: 巨嬰; pinyin: JùYīng), alternatively translated as giant baby, is a Chinese buzzword that originally denotes a baby of giant size, but is now generally used to describe a psychologically immature adult. The term was first used by Chinese consulting psychologist Wu Zhihong in 2016 in his book titled A Country of Giant Infants.

In A Country of Giant Infants, the concept refers to a "grown-up baby" who is physically an adult, but whose mental development is still at the level of an infant before the age of one. The nation formed by these giant babies is called the "Giant Baby Nation".

These "giant infants" are afflicted with a range of mental disorders – anxiety, depression, paranoia, persecution mania, feelings of helplessness. They are formed unconsciously. Being taken care of is not the most important characteristic of a giant infant, but rather the lack of opportunity to become an independent individual.

== See also ==
- Little emperor syndrome
- Childism
