= Youth suffrage =

Right of youth to vote

Youth suffrage is the right to vote for young people. It forms part of the broader universal suffrage and youth rights movements. Most democracies and one authoritarian state have lowered the voting age to between 16 and 18, while some advocates for children's suffrage hope to remove age restrictions entirely.

== Discussion ==
=== Suffrage ===
According to advocates, the "one man, one vote" democratic ideal supports giving voting rights to as many people as possible in order for the wisdom of a more representative electorate to create better outcomes for society. Advocates suggest that setting a voting age at or below 16, would accomplish that goal, while also creating a more ethical democracy for those who believe that those most impacted by government decisions (those with the longest life expectancy) are given at least an equal say in decision-making.

==== Presumptive inclusion ====
The idea of presumptive inclusion holds that individuals should be given the right to vote by default and only removed if the government can decisively prove why someone shouldn't have that right. Erring on the side of over-inclusion also checks the temptations of those with power (or simply status quo bias) to exclude capable voters. The first reason for exclusion that is seen as legitimate by some democratic theorists is competence, while the second is connection to the community. Age-related debates fall under the question of competence.

=== Sufficient literacy, comprehension and intelligence ===
Many countries don't require literacy in order to vote, validating the idea that attaining a certain level of education is not needed to understand how to cast a vote according to one's interest or beliefs. In the 1965 U.S. Voting Rights Act for example, it was determined that a 6th grade education (typically achieved by age 12-13) provided "sufficient literacy, comprehension and intelligence to vote in any election." If kids were given the same tests that adults whose brains are atypical must pass in order to vote, then many pre-adolescents would qualify as competent (see also: ableism, neurodiversity, and Suffrage for Americans with disabilities). Additionally, ballots cast by someone (ie kids) with little understanding might simply randomly allocate votes and have no impact on the outcome of the election.

Further, law professor Vivian Hamilton argues that in light of findings from research in developmental psychology and cognitive and social neuroscience, governments can "no longer justify the electoral exclusion of mid-adolescents by claiming that they lack the relevant competencies."

John Wall argues that precisely because children and youth think differently than adults, that they would make unique contributions to decisions around issues with their fresh perspectives and useful abilities such as compassion for suffering and even great wisdom.

=== Political knowledge ===
As for knowledge around the political decisions at the ballot box, Daniel Hart argues that 16-year-olds have proved just as capable of evaluating the candidates that align with their values and interests as 18 and 19-year-olds (though not as much knowledge as 30 year-olds).

Others dispute whether not having the average political knowledge of an 18 year-old is a good reason for exclusion, given the double-standard of how adults don't have to prove some level of political knowledge before voting. Additionally, not every voter is expected to know about every issue, but the wisdom of the crowd from different expertise and life experiences is what contributes to a healthy and informed citizenry, including perspectives that are unique to those under 18. Most people use heuristics (political party, endorsements, etc.) to decide who to vote for, there's evidence that heuristics can be a more effective approach in voting rationally than a detailed issue-by-issue analysis of each candidate in each race. Additionally, while prior knowledge and experience can provide greater understanding, it can also lead to less informed decision-making by closing an otherwise open mind.

Some scholars advocating for a further reduced voting age, promote the idea that it should be always be optional below a certain age, so that those who feel they don't know enough yet aren't forced to participate until they want to.

Disputes over youth suffrage have historically been linked to partisan efforts to restrict voting. The 1971 passage of the Twenty-Sixth Amendment to the US. Constitution, which gave young people the vote at age eighteen, spurred conflicts with regard to where students should vote. Those who opposed allowing students to vote in their college towns argued that students should be forced to vote where their parents lived, and sometimes these efforts were specifically aimed at Black students.

=== Youth activism ===
Youth and student activists have a long history of learning about and advocating for more inclusive futures, so young advocates have begun asking for the ability to vote on some or all issues.

=== Independence from peers and parents ===
Parents have not been shown to have influence over youth voting behavior in studies of countries where the vote has been given to 16-year-olds, just as this fear didn't manifest when women were given the right to vote. Likewise, peer pressure has been shown to have no greater influence on teens than on adults when it comes to voting.

John Wall argues that even if children chose to vote exactly as either their parents or their peers, it would not justify their disenfranchisement just as such behavior would not disqualify adults.

=== Maturity ===
While teenagers can be more impulsive in certain 'hot' contexts until their early 20's, in a 'cool contexts,' such as in a voting booth, there is no significant difference in a 16-year-old's ability to make careful, rational decisions like any other voter. Others contend that governments shouldn't withhold rights that young children can perform, like voting, just because they haven't received other rights that they can't perform, like driving. A lot of development in that analytical part of the brain takes place between 14 and 16, which is why 16 year-olds are often given more societal privileges like being able to work jobs or drive a car that are more difficult than voting. Under Roman law, the age minimum for full citizenship was 14 (for males), while in much of 9th-11th century France, Germany and Northern Europe the age of adulthood (largely for fighting in wars) was 15.

=== Legitimacy and trust ===
Scholars have found no negative effects from lowering the voting age in countries around the world, and in many places, positive ones like increased trust in institutions and a more favorable view of the lower voting age over time. A study of five countries in Latin America, for example, where the voting age was lowered to 16 showed a significant association with trust in government and a marginal association with satisfaction. In addition to taxation without representation, governments derive their just authority from the consent of the governed. To be legitimate, those who govern and those who legislate, the argument goes, must be elected by the people, not a special subset of the people.

=== Voting skills and habits ===
Scholars have found no negative effects from lowering the voting age below 18 in countries around the world, and in many places, positive ones like increased turnout and engagement. Youth enfranchisement at a more stable life stage (before 18) has been shown to develop more robust and long-lasting voting habits, leading to greater rates (~25% higher, according to one study) of voting in the future. Studies in Norway, Austria and Scotland found that allowing 16-year-olds to vote led those voters to have "substantially higher levels of engagement with representative democracy (through voting) as well as other forms of political participation". A study of preregistration (registering individuals before they are eligible to vote) in the U.S. found that it was linked to higher youth turnout, and that politicians became more responsive to issues that the young have strong preferences on, such as higher education spending. While some South American countries (Argentina, Brazil and Ecuador) lower their voting age to 16, they also have compulsory voting starting at 18, making it difficult to study turnout effects from the lower voting age. Indonesia provides a potential case-study for non-western democracies, though they have only lowered their voting age to 17. Educating children for and about democracy would likely be longer lasting if the voting age were lowered or eliminated, while just how skilled kids could become over the course of a few elections is unknowable since it has yet to be tried below the age of 16.

== Proposed minimum voting ages ==
=== 16 ===
Currently the lowest national voting age around the world, there seems to be a consensus in studies of elections that voters at 16 have proven to be substantially the same as voters at 18. The majority of campaigns to lower the voting age worldwide (as of January 2023) seek a voting age of 16, with perhaps the most notable example being the European Union's endorsement that its members lower their voting ages to 16. In countries with both compulsory voting and a voting age at 16 (Argentina, Brazil and Ecuador), the penalties for not voting start at 18.

=== 15 ===
The United Nations defines "youth" as being from ages 15 to 24. In the United States, Avi Hein and Ta-Nehisi Coates called for lowering the voting age to 15.

=== 14 ===
In Canada virtually all political parties set their internal membership and voting ages to 14.

=== 6 ===
Politics professor David Runciman argues for lowering the voting age to 6, given that at that age children tend to be in school and have enough ability to read and fill out a multiple-choice ballot.

=== 5 ===
Youth councils (or children's parliaments) often include children starting at age 5, which John Wall submits as evidence of their readiness for other civic roles such as voting (note: he advocates eliminating age requirements altogether).

=== 4 ===
Democratic schools practice and support universal suffrage in school, which allows a vote to every member of the school including students and staff. Schools hold that this feature is essential for students to be ready to move into society at large. The Sudbury Valley School, for example, allows all children ages 4 and up an equal say in its operation.

=== 0 (Eliminate age requirements) ===
Some advocate for eliminating age as a factor altogether in enfranchisement noting that in practice most very young children won't choose to vote, but that they should have the right to do so when they feel ready, with some supporting a proxy vote to be awarded to their parents until the child wants to vote. Others cite how literacy tests were banned for adults, and therefore should be done away with for young kids too by removing the voting age.

== See also ==
- Age of candidacy
- Deliberative democracy
- Demeny voting
- Intergenerational equity
- Political equality
- Suffrage for Americans with disabilities
- Voting age
- Youth
- Youth activism
- Youth rights
- Youth voice
