= Ansley J. Coale =

American economist (1917–2002)

- Born: November 14, 1917; Baltimore, Maryland
- Died: November 5, 2002 (aged 84); Newtown, Bucks County, Pennsylvania
- Education: Princeton University
- Scientific career
- Fields: Demography; Sociology
- Workplaces: Princeton University
- Thesis: The Social and Economic Problems of Reducing Vulnerability to Atomic Bombs (1947)
- Doctoral advisors: Frank W. Notestein; Frank Dunstone Graham
- Doctoral students: Samuel H. Preston; Thomas Espenshade

Ansley Johnson Coale (November 14, 1917 – November 5, 2002), was one of America's foremost demographers. A native to Baltimore, Maryland, he earned his Bachelor of Arts in 1939, his Master of Arts in 1941, and (after a period of service in the Navy) his Ph.D. in 1947, all at Princeton University. A long-term director of the Office of Population Research at Princeton, Coale was especially influential for his work on the demographic transition and for his leadership of the European Fertility Project.

== Early childhood and education ==
Ansley Coale was the youngest of three children born from Nellie and James Coale. One year after he was born, his family moved to Cleveland, Ohio, where he spent most of his early years receiving an "excellent" education.

The Coale family moved to Annapolis, Maryland, in 1928. Ansley Coale attended a public high school starting in 1930. His intentions were to enroll in Princeton University like his older brother, Jim, did in 1933. By the time Ansley was 16 years old, he was ready to graduate high school. After an extra year at the Mercersburg Academy, a preparatory school, he was accepted into Princeton. This extra year of education was not only important for his intellectual development, but he ended up having 18 companions from the academy that also went to Princeton.

After he obtained his Bachelor's of Arts (BA) and master's degree in economics, Ansley Coale was offered a fellowship by the director of the Office of Population Research, Frank Notestein, as long as demography was a field of study. Over the years, the two of them became well-known demographers. In 1947, six years after he received his master's degree, Ansley Coale obtained his Ph.D.

== Works ==
In addition to being the William Church Osborne Professor of Public Affairs Emeritus and professor of economics emeritus at Princeton University, Coale was a prolific author, publishing more than 125 books and articles on a wide variety of demographic topics. His Growth and Structure of Human Populations (1972) is considered an essential textbook for those interested in formal demography. He also trained and served as a mentor to many students who would become leaders in the field.

Coale joined the faculty at Princeton in 1947, the same year he received his Ph.D. at the same site. He spent his entire academic career at the university's Office of Population Research, serving as director from 1959 to 1975. He was president of the Population Association of America in 1967–68 and president of the International Union for the Scientific Study of Population (IUSSP) from 1977 to 1981.

Coale's first major influential work was Population Growth and Economic Development in Low-Income Countries (1958), which he co-wrote with Edgar Hoover. The results, which showed that slowing population growth could enhance economic development, had a major impact on public policy and set the research agenda in this field.

This study was followed by Regional Model Life Tables and Stable Populations (1966), which he co-wrote with Paul Demeny. These model life tables both established new empirical regularities and proved invaluable in the development of later techniques for estimating mortality and fertility in populations with inaccurate or incomplete data. Along with William Brass, Coale pioneered the development and use of these techniques, first explained in Methods of Estimating Basic Demographic Measures From Incomplete Data (1967, with Demeny) and in The Demography of Tropical Africa (1968, with other demographers).

Perhaps Coale's most major scientific contribution was to the understanding of the demographic transition. The Demographic Transition, as stated by Coale, occurs when a country develops a strong economy, and within the society, low fertility and mortality will start to reflect based upon the economic standpoint. Coale was the pioneer of the European Fertility Project, which examined the decline in marital fertility in Europe. The European Fertility Project's goal was to correlate the fertility rates within married couples with the rate of infant mortality. Coale established three pre-conditions to fertility decline. The first is "within the conscious of choice." In other words, it is up to the individual and within their own decision whether or not to have children. The second is that if a society sees not having children as advantageous, then fertility will decline. The third pre-condition is to have contraception methods ready. A society will start to show signs of fertility decline if these three pre-conditions are met.

Initiated in 1963, the project resulted in the publication of nine major books summarizing the change in childbearing over a century in the 700 provinces in Europe. The Project findings eventually led to the conclusion that even though economical factors can play a role in fertility decline, this is not the absolute determinant of fertility decline. The European Fertility Project led to a better understanding that infant mortality and fertility decline do not necessarily follow each other.

With a long-time interest in the population of Russia, which first found outlet in Coale's work on the life tables that he constructed for Frank Lorimer's classic The Population of the Soviet Union (1946), Coale also later co-authored a volume on Russia for the European Fertility Project series.

Toward the end of his career, Coale became interested in the population changes in China and understanding the fertility transition there as well as factors affecting the sex ratio at birth. In a 1986 study he conducted, India and China were compared in both their population size and fertility trends. A survey named the "1/1000 Fertility Survey" reached out to women living in various provinces of China and asked them to relate a brief history of their marital status and a family planning discussion. The survey contributed to an understanding of the population and fertility changes that would occur in China shortly after. Published in a Journal article called Population trends in China and India, Coale introduced the possible causes of differences in fertility trends in such highly populated countries. These reasons are based on policies put in place to reduce birth rates as well as some cultural differences that come into play. Finally, Coale presents the future of both countries and states that despite the efforts to reduce birth rates, the countries will remain the most populated.

== Honors ==
Coale was a member of the National Academy of Sciences, the American Academy of Arts and Sciences and the American Philosophical Society, and was a recipient of several honorary degrees from universities including Princeton, the University of Pennsylvania, the University of Louvain and the University of Liège. He was also a corresponding fellow of the British Academy.

== Selected bibliography ==
- Coale, Ansley J. (1967). “Factors associated with the development of low fertility: An historic summary,” in United Nations, Proceedings of the World Population Conference, Belgrade, 30 August–10 September 1965. Vol. 2. New York: United Nations: 205–9.
- ——— (1969). “The decline of fertility in Europe from the French Revolution to World War II,” in S. J. Behrman and Leslie Corsa, Eds. Fertility and Family Planning: A World View. Ann Arbor: University of Michigan Press: 3–24.
- ——— (1971). “Age patterns at marriage.” Population Studies 25: 193–214.
- ——— (1972). The Growth and Structure of Human Populations: A Mathematical Investigation. Princeton, Princeton University Press.
- ——— (1978). "Population Growth and Economic Development: The Case of Mexico." Foreign Affairs 56(2): 415–429.
- ——— (1984). Rapid Population Change in China, 1952-1982. Washington, D.C.: National Academy Press.
- ——— (1991). "Excess Female Mortality and the Balance of the Sexes in the Population: An Estimate of the Number of "Missing Females," Population and Development Review 17(3): 517–523.
- ——— (1992). “Age of entry into marriage and the date of the initiation of voluntary birth control.” Demography 29: 333–41.
- ——— (1996). "Age Patterns and Time Sequence of Mortality in National Populations with the Highest Expectation of Life at Birth." Population and Development Review 22.
- ——— (1996). "Five Decades of Missing Females in China," Proceedings of the American Philosophical Society 140 (4): 421–450.
- Coale, Ansley J., Barbara A. Anderson, and Erna Härm (1979). Human Fertility in Russia since the Nineteenth Century. Princeton, NJ: Princeton University Press.
- Coale, Ansley J., and Paul Demeny (1966). Regional Model Life Tables and Stable Populations. New York: Academic Press.
- Coale, Ansley J., and Edgar M. Hoover (1958). Population Growth and Economic Development in Low Income Countries. Princeton: Princeton University Press.
- Coale, Ansley J.; Stephan, Frederick F. (1962). "The Case of the Indians and the Teen-Age Widows". Journal of the American Statistical Association. 57 (298): 338–347. doi:10.1080/01621459.1962.10480663. PMID 12335707.
- Coale, Ansley J., and Roy Treadway (1986). “A summary of the changing distribution of overall fertility, marital fertility, and the proportion married in the provinces of Europe,” in Ansley J. Coale and Susan Cotts Watkins, Eds. The Decline of Fertility in Europe. Princeton, NJ: Princeton University Press: 31–181.
- Coale, Ansley J.; Trussell, James T. (1974). "Model fertility schedules: Variations in the age structure of childbearing in human populations". Population Index. 40 (2): 185–258. doi:10.2307/2733910. JSTOR 2733910. PMID 12333625.
- ——— (1975). “A new method of estimating standard fertility measures from incomplete data.” Population Index 41: 182–210.
- ——— (1978). “Finding the two parameters that specify a model schedule of marital fertility rates.” Population Index 44: 203–13.
- Coale, Ansley J., and Susan Cotts Watkins, Eds. (1986). The Decline of Fertility in Europe. Princeton, NJ: Princeton University Press.
- Coale, Ansley J., and Melvin Zelnik (1963). New Estimates of Fertility and Population in the United States: A Study of Annual White Births from 1855 to 1960 and of Completeness of Enumeration in the Censuses from 1880 to 1960. Princeton, NJ: Princeton University Press.
- Horiuchi, Shiro; Coale, Ansley J. (1982). "A simple equation for estimating the expectation of life at old ages". Population Studies. 36 (2): 317–326. doi:10.2307/2174203. JSTOR 2174203. PMID 22077276.
- ——— (1990). "Age patterns of mortality for older women: an analysis using age-specific rate of mortality change with age." Mathematical Population Studies 2(4): 245–267.
- Preston, Samuel H.; Coale, Ansley J. (1982). "Age Structure, Growth, Attrition and Accession: A New Synthesis". Population Index. 50 (2): 214–226.
- Trussell, James, Ansley J. Coale, Paul Demeny, and Geoffrey McNicoll (Eds.). 2003. The Encyclopedia of Population. New York, Macmillan Reference USA, Vol. 1, 132–313.
