= Demeny voting =

Type of proxy voting on behalf of children

Demeny voting, also called parental voting or family voting, is a type of proxy voting which allows parents or guardians to vote on the behalf of children. The term is named after demographer Paul Demeny, though the concept predates him. It is often proposed as a measure to ensure the (indirect) representation of children who are considered too young to vote. Under a Demeny voting system, parents would cast a proxy vote for their child, possibly allowing for a split weighted vote if the parents' political views differ.

== Etymology ==
Demeny voting is named after demographer Paul Demeny. Demeny argued that children "should not be left disenfranchised for some 18 years: let custodial parents exercise the children's voting rights until they come of age". Demeny's motivation behind proposing such a system was to "make the political system more responsive to the young generation's interests" and was part of a broader set of policy proposals aimed at combating the low fertility rate in certain countries.

== History ==
The idea predates Demeny; it was regularly discussed in France in the 1920s and was almost adopted by the National Assembly. In Germany, the idea was first discussed in the 1910s. In the 1970s and 1980s, lawyers and political scientists began a discussion which is still going on. In 2003 and 2008 the German parliament held votes on whether to introduce such a right (called Kinderwahlrecht), but both proposals were defeated.

Pieter Vanhuysse (head of research and Deputy Director at the European Centre for Social Welfare Policy and Research, Vienna) argued in 2013 that in Austria, where there are relatively strong pro-elderly policies, that "the time is ripe for at least opening a clear-headed and empirically informed democratic debate about the radical idea of giving each parent one half extra vote, to be used on behalf of each under-age child until that child reaches legal voting age".

Japan has discussed Demeny voting as a possible answer to its aging population, which gives disproportionate voice to the elderly as a result of their increasing numbers. This follows the publication of a paper by Reiko Aoki of the Centre for Intergenerational Studies at Hitotsubashi University and Rhema Vaithianathan of the University of Auckland. On 2 March 2011, the Centre for Intergenerational Studies at Hitotsubashi University hosted a conference on Demeny voting. Aoki and Vaithianathan have also conducted a number of surveys on voter attitude to Demeny Voting and found that a considerable percentage of respondents would cast their children's vote differently to their own. In July 2013, Nikkei in Japan wrote a major editorial supporting the idea as part of a debate on constitutional reform in Japan. In Hungary, the ruling Fidesz coalition advocated Demeny voting but admitted in April 2011 that it probably would not come into practice for some time.

Paul Demeny discussed the idea on a CBC interview. Professor Miles Corak from the University of Ottawa has also written a blog on the idea and promoted it in Canada. He suggests that it is supported on a humanitarian basis since the UN Convention on the Rights of the Child provides that children be given civil and political rights. He suggests that given the evidence that households where mothers control the purse-strings spend more on their children, it is mothers who ought to be given the proxy vote until the child comes of age. Corak's thesis has been taken up by journalist-turned-politician Chrystia Freeland.

== Arguments in favor ==
Aoki and Vaithianathan argue that Demeny voting is justified because it reduces gerontocracy. They calculate that Demeny voting in Japan would increase the parent voting bloc from 24% to 37% and lower the over-55-year-old voter-bloc from 43% to 35%.

Stefan Olsson argues that "the delegation of the children's right to vote is not any stranger than when adults delegate political authority to their elected representative. After the election, the representatives have the right to make use of this authority." He suggests that delegating a child's authority to the parent is perfectly reasonable. Olsson also argues that there are other areas where parents are delegated authority such as what the child eats, where he goes to school, and children are regularly represented in a court of law by parents. He says, "Arguing that parents cannot act as their children's representative because they might abuse their position becomes absurd in comparison to all the other powers parents already have over their children."

It has been suggested it would make it harder for elderly voters to vote in governments that borrow money for social security but which will only be paid back by future generations. It may ensure that the needs of children, such as education, childcare, and healthcare, are better taken into account. It could also make governments more ecologically conscious as younger people will be more affected by poor environmental policy than older voters. Finally, extending the vote to children may increase their involvement in politics, encouraging children to grow up and be more active citizens.

== Arguments made against ==
=== Enfranchising children is preferable ===
Some writers argue that, like marrying or making a will, voting is an exercise of the informed will and cannot legitimately be done by proxy. Some opponents see Demeny voting as a violation of a fundamental normative principle of democracy: "one person, one vote". They point to the fact that children below the minimum voting age can hold different political opinions and thus prefer different parties to their parents. There is no evidence that parents would split their votes. Instead, they would have plural votes for the same party they prefer and have formerly preferred.

Yet others have argued that more youth suffrage, by lowering the voting age to 13 or 14 or lower would be more beneficial, as many children are able to express complex opinions at that age. Further, law professor Vivian Hamilton argues that in light of findings from research in developmental psychology and cognitive and social neuroscience, governments can "no longer justify the electoral exclusion of mid-adolescents by claiming that they lack the relevant competencies". In the United Kingdom, politics professor David Runciman argues for lowering the voting age to 6. Some scholars advocate a 'flexible voting age' building on the willingness of minors to participate in elections. The 'flexible voting age' proposal contains a need for adolescents to register in voting lists and so differs from proposals that come under the name of 'voting from birth on' or 'voting age zero'. It takes into account that infants, small children and many younger adolescents will have no interest in political participation.

=== Suffrage should only be for adults ===
Others have argued that with the right to vote comes other obligations of citizenship, such as military service. Some people worry that the power of older votes will be diluted and the interests of children might be prioritised above those of the elderly. Jon Elster has argued that if the justification for Demeny is on the basis of consequences, then said consequences should be voted on, rather than changing the voting demographic. His argument is that to advance Demeny voting on the grounds that it leads to desirable consequences is pointless, since it will be blocked by exactly those groups who will block the desired consequences (e.g. raising the pension age).

== Variations ==
In 1998, family law professor Jane Rutherford considered proxy voting on behalf of children as a means of achieving fair representation of their interests in political debate in the context of the United States. As criteria for who should hold proxies for children, she suggested the following: "(1) the representative should have a stake in a very substantial shared venture with the child; (2) the representative should be personally familiar with the needs and circumstances of the child; (3) the child should have ready and frequent access to the representative so the child can express herself in her own terms whenever possible; (4) the representative should be accountable to the child in some fashion, either emotionally or legally; and (5) the representative should share an emotional bond with the child that promotes caring, sympathy, and empathy."

In 2014, childhood studies professor John Wall put forward a proposal for proxy-claim suffrage, in which a child could actively claim their right to vote from their proxy-holder, rather than passively waiting for age-based voting qualification. He further developed this idea and its relation to childism in the book Give Children the Vote: on Democratizing Democracy. Wall co-founded the ongoing Children's Voting Colloquium with Robin Chen to bring together in virtual society discussants of minimum voting age reform.

== See also ==
- Intergenerational equity
