= Samuel H. Preston =

American demographer (born 1943)

- Born: December 2, 1943 (age 82)
- Education: Princeton University
- Scientific career
- Fields: Demography
- Workplaces: University of Pennsylvania
- Doctoral students: Alberto Palloni

Samuel Hulse Preston (born December 2, 1943) is an American demographer and sociologist whose known for his work in the fields of demography, population health, and social science research in the United States and internationally. He is one of the leading demographers in the United States. He served as a professor of sociology and later as dean of the School of Arts and Sciences. He is currently professor emeritus at the University of Pennsylvania.

== Education ==
Preston grew up in Yardley, Pennsylvania. He earned a Bachelor of Arts degree in economics from Amherst College in 1965, graduating magna cum laude and Phi Beta Kappa, before completing his doctoral studies at Princeton University.

== Academic career ==
Preston received his Ph.D. in economics from Princeton University in 1968. Preston began his academic career as an assistant professor of demography at the University of California, Berkeley, from 1968 to 1972. He later joined the University of Washington, where he served on the faculty from 1972 to 1977 and was director of the Center for Studies in Demography and Ecology.

In 1979, Preston joined the University of Pennsylvania, where he served as professor of sociology, chair of the sociology department, director of the Population Studies Center, and chair of the Graduate Group in Demography. He was dean of the School of Arts and Sciences from 1998 to 2004.

In 1979, Preston joined the University of Pennsylvania, where he served as professor of sociology, chair of the sociology department. He is a professor emeritus at the University of Pennsylvania in Philadelphia, Pennsylvania. He is also the former dean of the School of Arts and Sciences at the University of Pennsylvania, as well as a member of the National Academy of Sciences since 1987. He was elected to the American Academy of Arts and Sciences in 1986 and the American Philosophical Society in 1992.

== Honors and awards ==
The Preston curve is named after him. Preston's major research interest is in the health of populations. He has written primarily about mortality trends and patterns in large aggregates, including 20th-century mortality transitions and black/white differentials in the United States.

Preston received the Irene B. Taeuber Award for Excellence in Demographic Research, the Mindel C. Sheps Award, and designation as a Laureate of the International Union for the Scientific Study of Population in 1998. Preston is a fellow of the American Association for the Advancement of Science, the American Statistical Association, and the American Academy of Political and Social Science. He has served as president of the Population Association of America and president of the Sociological Research Association.

== Publications ==
- Preston, Samuel H., & Michael Haines. (1991), Fatal Years: Child Mortality in Late Nineteenth Century America., Princeton: Princeton University Press
- Preston, Samuel H. (1993), The Epidemiological transition: policy and planning implications for developing countries, Washington, DC: National Academy Press, ISBN 9780585273143
- Preston, Samuel H, Patrick Heuveline, and Michel Guillot. (1991), Demography: Measuring and Modeling Population Processes., New York: Blackwell
