= Korea National Arboretum =

Arboretum in Gyeonggi Province, South Korea

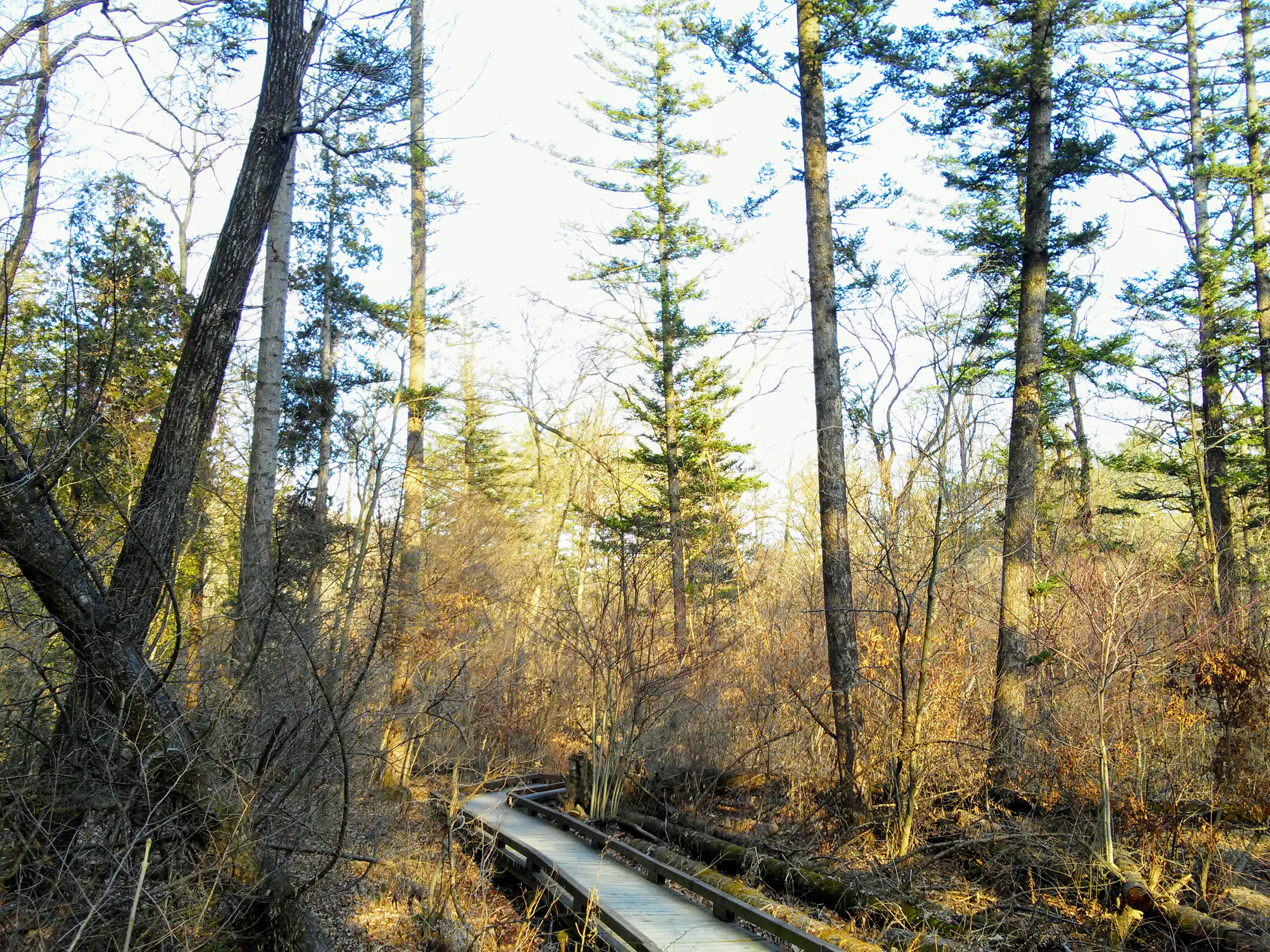
- Interactive map of Korea National Arboretum
- Type: Botanical garden
- Location: Pocheon, Gyeonggi Province, South Korea
- Coordinates: 37°45′18″N 127°09′54″E
- Website: kna.forest.go.kr

Korea National Arboretum (Korean: 국립수목원), also called Gwangneung Forest (광릉숲), is an arboretum in Pocheon, Gyeonggi Province, South Korea. It is designated as a UNESCO World Network of Biosphere Reserve in 2010. The arboretum includes the white-bellied woodpecker and 900 plant species.

== History ==
Its history can be traced back to the Joseon period. The planting of large forests started during the reign of King Sejo. He and Queen Jeonghui designated the area for a tomb which later named Gwangneung. Their tomb is one of Royal Tombs of the Joseon Dynasty, a UNESCO World Heritage Site. Following the construction of the tomb, it and its surrounding areas were designated as royal forest and kept under strict protection which lasted throughout post-Joseon history. The area was devastated during the Korean War. From 1983 to 1987, the central government went under project to develop the area as an arboretum with a forest museum. Upon its completion in 1987, it was finally open to the general public. In 1999 its status was elevated to National Arboretum becoming the first of its kind in the country's history. In 2020, it was reported to be a no kid zone.
