= Government-General of Chōsen Library =

1923–1945 library in colonial Korea

- 朝鮮総督府図書館
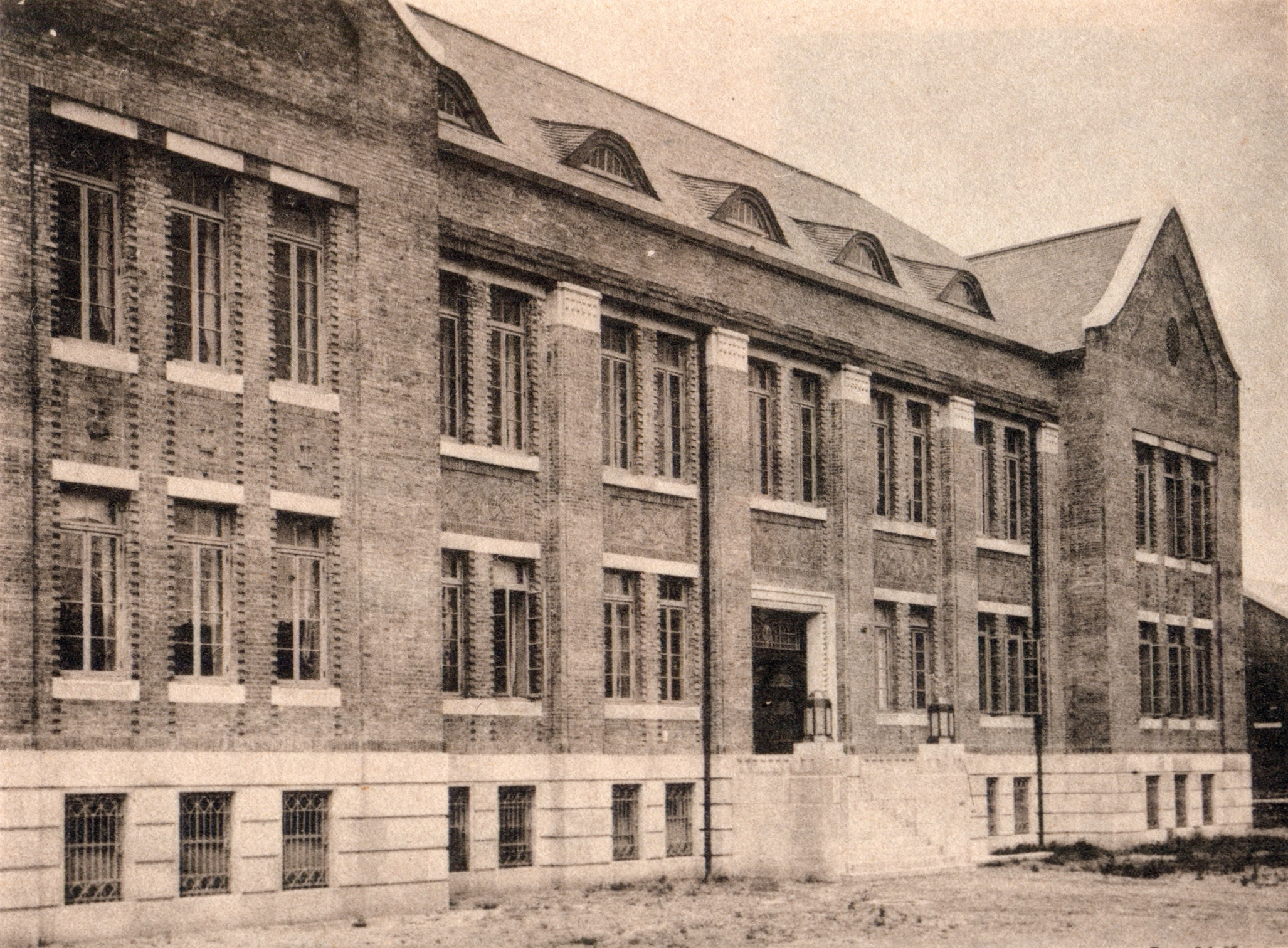
- The library, when it had two floors above ground (1924)

General information
- Type: Library
- Location: Keijō (Seoul), Keiki-dō, Korea, Empire of Japan
- Groundbreaking: March 1923
- Completed: December 1923
- Opened: December 1923
- Closed: 1945
- Owner: Government-General of Chōsen

Technical details
- Floor count: 6

The Government-General of Chōsen Library (Japanese: 朝鮮総督府図書館, Korean: 조선총독부 도서관) was a library in Sogong-dong, Keijō (Seoul), Keiki-dō, Korea, Empire of Japan from 1923 to 1945. It was succeeded by the South Korean National Library of Korea thereafter.

The library was conceptualized as part of the "cultural rule" (文化政治, bunka seiji) movement of the Government-General of Chōsen. The movement was a result of the 1919 nationwide March First Movement protests, and was intended to quell future unrest in colonial Korea.

The main library building was constructed in Sogong-dong, Jung District from March to December 1923. Upon its completion, it had two floors above ground and one semi-basement floor. The museum was eventually renovated to have five floors above ground. The cost for constructing the building was 270,000 yen. It was funded by the Bank of Chōsen.

It continued to operate as a library until the 1945 liberation of Korea. Afterwards, it was succeeded by the South Korean National Library of Korea. The original building was sold to Lotte Hotel in October 1973, and the transfer was finalized in July 1974.

According to a post on the National Library of Korea website accessed in March 2024, the original library building was the longest-used library building in Korea, having been used for 50 years.
