= Korean Library Association =

Cooperative professional library organization

- 한국도서관협회
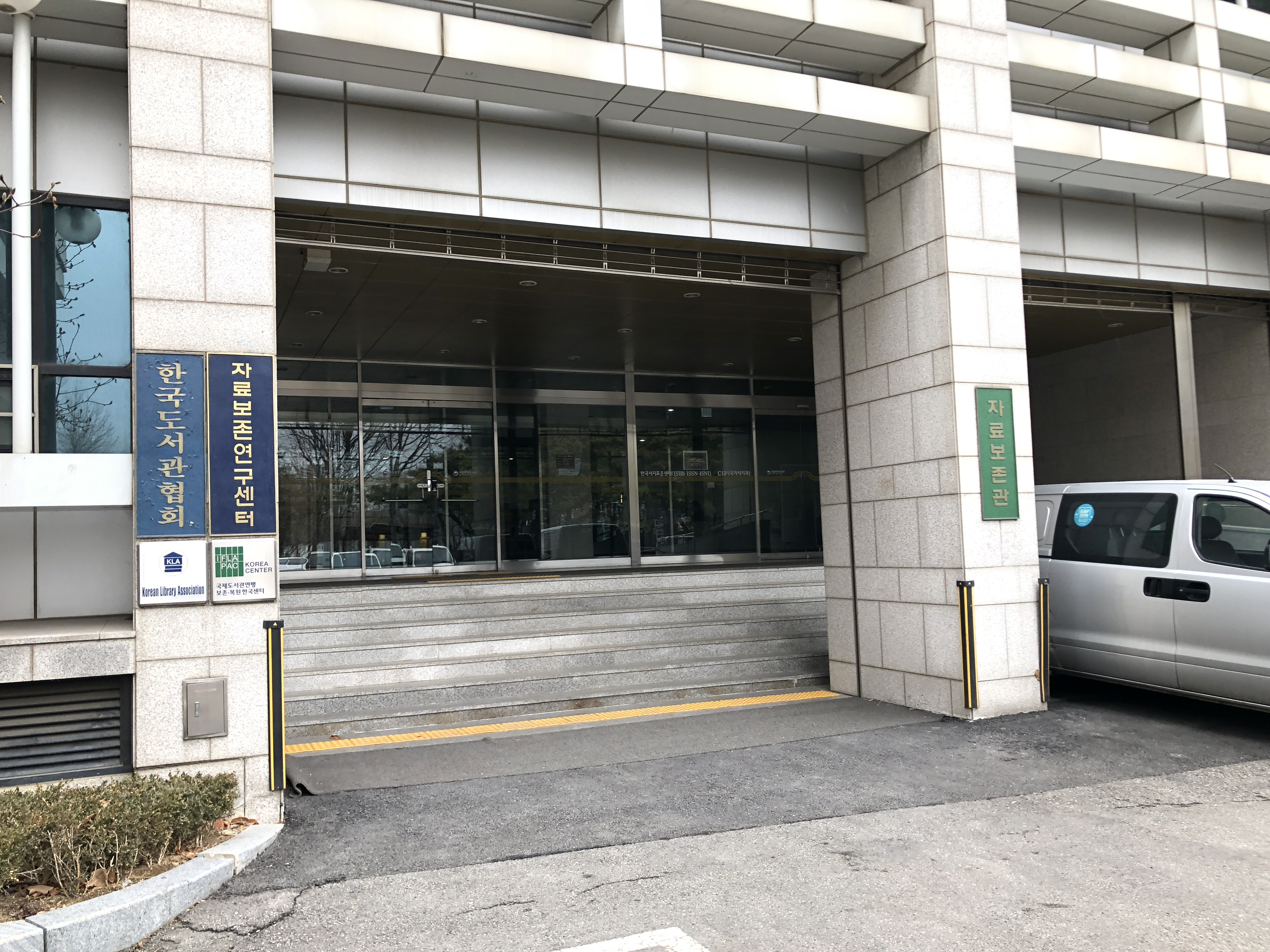
- Korean Library Association offices in Seoul, 2018
- Established: August 30, 1945; 81 years ago
- Headquarters: Seocho District, Seoul
- Fields: Library science
- Affiliations: International Federation of Library Associations and Institutions
- Website: www.kla.kr

The Korean Library Association (Korean: 한국도서관협회) is a South Korean non-profit professional library organization under the jurisdiction of the Ministry of Culture, Sports and Tourism. It was established on August 30, 1945, for the purposes of promoting libraries, facilitating mutual exchange of materials, conducting research on business cooperation, improving staff qualifications and promoting common interests. Its offices are located within the National Library of Korea.

The organization was originally named the Joseon Library Association, after the Joseon Dynasty. It reestablished itself with its current name after the end of the Korean War, corresponding with the country's changing national identity. The KLA joined the Internation Federation of Library Associations on 8 September 1955, and in 2024, reported over 22,000 libraries throughout the country.

In 2025, Jinwoo Lee, a former director of a library in Seongbuk District, was appointed as the 32nd KLA President, replacing Seung-jin Kwak.

== Activities ==
- The "Humanities on the Road" project is a public service initiative promoted by the Korea Library Association since 2013.
- Publishing the Korean Library Association Journal
- Urging research and implementation regarding library management and operation technology
- Compilation of materials on medicine, libraries, and reading
- Education and status improvement of library staff
- Guide to the distribution, establishment, and operation of libraries
- Bibliographical projects and selection of books for distribution
- Promotion and progress of the reading campaign
- Standardization and distribution of library supplies
- It hosts the annual Korean Library Association General Conference.
- Large-type printing production and distribution project

== World Library Information Congress ==
The KLA first hosted the World Library Information Congress (WLIC) in Seoul in 2006, an international event for librarians.

In 2026, the Korean Library Association is the host of the 90th World Library Information Congress (WLIC) in Busan.

== See also ==
- National Library of Korea
- List of public libraries in Seoul
