= Alberto Palloni =

- Born: April 29, 1949 (age 77); Chile
- Education: University of Washington (Ph.D., 1977)
- Known for: Work on health and mortality as they relate to demography
- Awards: Guggenheim Fellow (1987–88); Fellow of the Center for Advanced Study in the Behavioral Sciences (1991–92)
- Scientific career
- Fields: Sociology; Demography
- Thesis: Estimating Infant and Childhood Mortality from Data on Children Surviving (1977)
- Doctoral advisor: Samuel H. Preston

Alberto Palloni (born April 29, 1949) is an Italian-American demographer and sociologist who works for the RAND Corporation. He was previously the Samuel H. Preston Professor of Sociology, and the E.T. Young Professor of Population and International Studies, at the University of Wisconsin-Madison. In 2006, he was the president of the Population Association of America.

== Biography ==
Palloni was born in Chile to Italian parents. He was educated at the Catholic University of Chile (B.S./B.A. in sociology, 1971) and the University of Washington (Ph.D. in sociology, 1977).

== Work ==
Palloni is known for his demographic research on health, morbidity, and mortality. For example, he and John L. Hagan published a study in 2006 estimating that the death toll from the war in Darfur was much higher than estimated by the United States government. He has also researched the disparity in life expectancy between American Hispanics and whites.
