= Frank Dunstone Graham =

American economist (1890–1949)

Frank D. Graham
- Born: January 1, 1890; Halifax, Nova Scotia
- Died: September 24, 1949 (aged 59); Princeton, New Jersey

Academic background
- Education: Harvard University; Dalhousie University
- Doctoral advisor: Frank William Taussig

Academic work
- Institutions: Princeton University
- Doctoral students: Ansley J. Coale

Frank Dunstone Graham (January 1, 1890 – September 24, 1949) was an American economist. He was a professor of economics at Princeton University from 1921 to 1945. Graham died in 1949 from a fall at Palmer Stadium during a Princeton Tigers football game.
