= Thomas Espenshade =

American economist (born 1943)

Thomas J. Espenshade
- Born: March 17, 1943 (age 83)
- Education: College of Wooster (B.A., 1965), Yale University (M.A.T., 1966), Princeton University (Ph.D., 1972)
- Awards: American Sociological Association's 2011 Pierre Bourdieu Award for No Longer Separate, Not Yet Equal: Race and Class in Elite College Admission and Campus Life (with Alexandria Walton Radford)
- Scientific career
- Fields: Sociology, demography
- Workplaces: Princeton University
- Thesis: The cost of children in urban United States (1972)

Thomas J. Espenshade (born March 17, 1943) is an American sociologist known for his work on social demography. He is an emeritus professor of sociology at Princeton University's Office of Population Research, as well as the director of the National Study of College Experience and the Campus Life in America Student Survey. He received his Ph.D. in economics from Princeton in 1972 and joined their faculty in 1988.

== Research ==
Espenshade is known for his work in the field of social demography, and is especially known for his work on population economics, demography and racial diversity in higher education in the United States. His 2009 book No Longer Separate, Not Yet Equal: Race and Class in Elite College Admission and Campus Life, co-authored with Alexandria Walton Radford, explores the issue of affirmative action in the United States from a quantitative perspective. The book concluded that Asian American applicants to United States colleges were much more likely to be rejected by seven elite colleges than were similar members of any other race. It received the American Sociological Association's Pierre Bourdieu Award, which is given to the year's best book on sociology of education, in 2011.
