= Information Center on North Korea =

South Korean research institution

The Information Center on North Korea (Korean: 북한자료센터; Hanja: 北韓資料센터) is an institution under the Ministry of Unification devoted to collect and study North Korea-related materials in South Korea. The center, located on the fifth floor of the National Library of Korea in Seoul, has a vast collection of over 100,000 North Korean publications and videos, including every edition of the Rodong Sinmun and the complete works of Kim Il Sung and Kim Jong Il. Besides political propaganda, its collection also includes children's books, textbooks and daily artifacts. The center obtained these materials through the official liaison with Pyongyang or purchasing them from Russia and China. It is an important hub for North Korea study for researchers in and outside Korea.

== See also ==
- North Korean studies
- Kim Il Sung bibliography
- Kim Jong Il bibliography
