= Frank W. Notestein =

- Born: August 16, 1902; Alma, Michigan, U.S.
- Died: February 19, 1983 (aged 80); Newtown, Pennsylvania, U.S.
- Education: College of Wooster (BS); Cornell University (PhD)
- Scientific career
- Fields: Demography
- Workplaces: Office of Population Research
- Thesis: An interpretation of the vital statistics of Cattaraugus County for the years 1916-1924 (1927)
- Doctoral advisor: Walter Francis Willcox
- Doctoral students: Ansley J. Coale

Frank Wallace Notestein (August 16, 1902 - February 19, 1983) was an American demographer who contributed significantly to the development of the science. He was the founding director of the Office of Population Research at Princeton University, and later president of the Population Council. He was the first director-consultant of the Population Division of the United Nations from 1947–1948.

== Education and career ==
Notestein attended three different colleges. Notestein spent his first year of college as a freshman at Alma College but later transferred to College of Wooster in 1923 and received a Bachelor of Science in economics. He then attended graduate school at Cornell University and later received a PhD in social statistics in 1927. Notestein completed his graduation thesis and set off to Europe where he studied occupational mortality for a year. Notestein was immediately offered a research associate position at Milbank Memorial Fund. He started in 1928, and while he was in the position, Notestein provided better understanding of declining fertility rate and mortality rate in the late nineteenth century and early twentieth century.

== Contributions to demography ==
Frank W. Notestein in 1945 provided labels for the types of growth patterns of the demographic transition that was found by Warren Thompson sixteen years earlier. With his modern thinking about population, Notestein introduced a program of research and graduate training at American University, as well as creating leadership in scholarship, the formation of policy, and technical assistance in matters relating to populations.

For his contributions, Notestein was elected to the American Philosophical Society in 1945 and the American Academy of Arts and Sciences in 1963.

== Personal life ==
Frank W. Notestein was born in Alma, Michigan on August 16, 1902. In high school, Notestein played football and served as the captain of the military company. In the summer, Notestein would work at the pickle factory and at a local furniture store as an assistant.

Frank Notestein was engaged to his classmate, Daphne Limbach, in his senior year in college. Four years later, they married. The couple then spent their honeymoon in Europe, where Notestein studied occupational mortality on a Social Science Research Council fellowship.

Notestein retired in 1968 and moved to live in Newtown, Pennsylvania, with his wife. On February 19, 1983, Notestein died from emphysema at the age of 80.

== Selected works ==
=== Books ===
- The Future Population of Europe and the Soviet Union: Population Projections, 1940–1970. with Irene B. Taeuber, Dudley Kirk, Ansley J. Coale, and Louise K. Kiser. Geneva: League of Nations. 1944. Archived from the original (membership required for full access) on 2008-04-26 – via Questia.
- Journal Article "Some Demographic Aspects of Aging" Frank W. Notestein Vol. 98, No. 1 (Feb. 15, 1954), pp. 38-45
- Notestein, Frank W. (1936) "Class Differences in Fertility." Annals of the American Academy of Political and Social Science 188: 26–36.
- Notestein, Frank W. (1943) "Some Implications of Population Change for Post-War Europe." Proceedings of the American Philosophical Society 87, no. 2 (August): 165–174.
- Notestein, Frank W. (1945). "Population–The Long View," In Food for the World, ed. Theodore W. Schultz. Chicago: University of Chicago Press.
- Notestein, Frank W. (1964). "Population Growth and Economic Development." Colombo. Reprinted in Population and Development Review 9 (1983): 345–360.
- Notestein, Frank W. (1967). "The Population Crisis: Reasons for Hope." Foreign Affairs 46(1): 167–180.
- Notestein, Frank W. (1982). "Demography in the United States: A Partial Account of the Development of the Field." Population and Development Review 8: 651–687.
- Stix, Regine K., and Frank W. Notestein (1940). Controlled Fertility: An Evaluation of Clinic Service.Baltimore: Williams and Wilkins.

=== Papers ===
- Notestein, Frank W. 1953. "Economic problems of population change", in Proceedings of the Eighth International Conference of Agricultural Economists. London: Oxford University Press, pp. 13–31.
