= Irene Barnes Taeuber =

American demographer

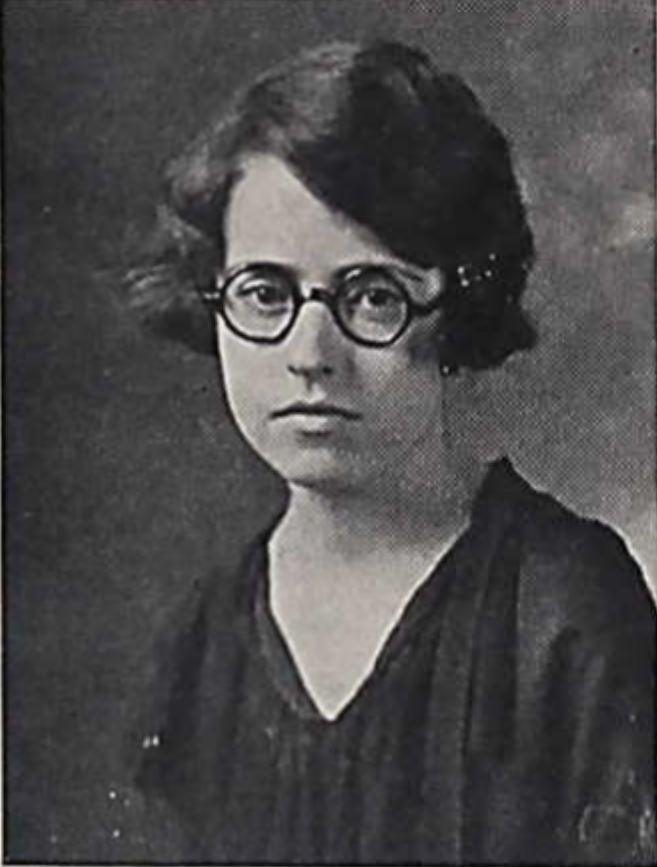
- Taeuber in 1926 University of Missouri yearbook
- Born: December 25, 1906; Meadville, Missouri
- Died: February 24, 1974 (aged 67); Hyattsville, Maryland
- Education: University of Minnesota
- Scientific career
- Fields: Demography
- Workplaces: Office of Population Research
- Thesis: Changes in the content and presentation of reading material in Minnesota weekly newspapers, 1860-1929 (1931)

Irene Barnes Taeuber (December 25, 1906 – February 24, 1974) was an American demographer who worked for the Office of Population Research at Princeton University, where she edited the journal Population Index from 1936 to 1954. Her scholarly work is credited with helping to establish the science of demography.

== Life ==
Irene Barnes was born on December 25, 1906, in Meadville, Missouri. She graduated from the University of Missouri in 1927, earned a master's degree in anthropology from Northwestern University in 1928, and completed her doctorate in sociology from the University of Minnesota in 1931. In 1929, while still a student, she married Conrad Taeuber; he and their children Richard and Karl would also become noted demographers.

She took a faculty position at Mount Holyoke College in 1931, but in 1934 her husband joined the Federal Emergency Relief Administration and she moved with him to Washington, DC. She began working on the journal Population Literature of the Population Association of America; when its editor Frank Lorimer left the position in 1935, the journal moved to the Office of Population Research at Princeton University, where it became Population Index, and she moved with it. She was initially a research associate there (part-time while her children were young), and was promoted to senior research demographer in 1961; she retired in 1973.

She died on February 24, 1974, of pneumonia and emphysema.

== Contributions ==
As well as her work on Population Index, Taeuber directed the Census Library Project, a joint effort of the Library of Congress and the Bureau of the Census, from 1942 to 1945. She also chaired committees on population and demography for the Pacific Science Association and American Sociological Association, and served as president of the Population Association of America for 1953–1954.

Taeuber wrote and edited many books and articles, totalling "a dozen influential books and book-length reports and some 250 articles and chapters." But her most significant work was the book The Population of Japan (Princeton University Press, 1958). Nearly 500 pages long, this book is in seven sections. The first one gives a historical and sociological overview of Japanese life and culture, followed by sections on the Meiji period and the modern era. Next follow sections on internal migrations, the Meiji-era expansion of the Japanese empire, the effects of fertility and mortality on the population, and a demographic view of the effects of World War II on Japan with an eye to future possibilities. This work "demonstrates the power of demographic analysis ... as an instrument for the description of social change". It was well-received in Japan, and a Japanese translation was published by the Mainichi Press.

== Recognition ==
Taeuber was elected as a Fellow by the American Academy of Arts and Sciences, American Association for the Advancement of Science, American Sociological Society, and American Statistical Association (1960). She was given honorary doctorates by Smith College in 1960, and by the Western College for Women in 1965. The Universities of Missouri and Minnesota also awarded her accomplishments, as did the American Sociological Society, which gave her their Stuart. A. Rice Award in 1972. The Irene B. Taeuber Award for research achievements of the Population Association of America is named in her honor.
