= National Library of Korea =

Public library in Seoul, South Korea

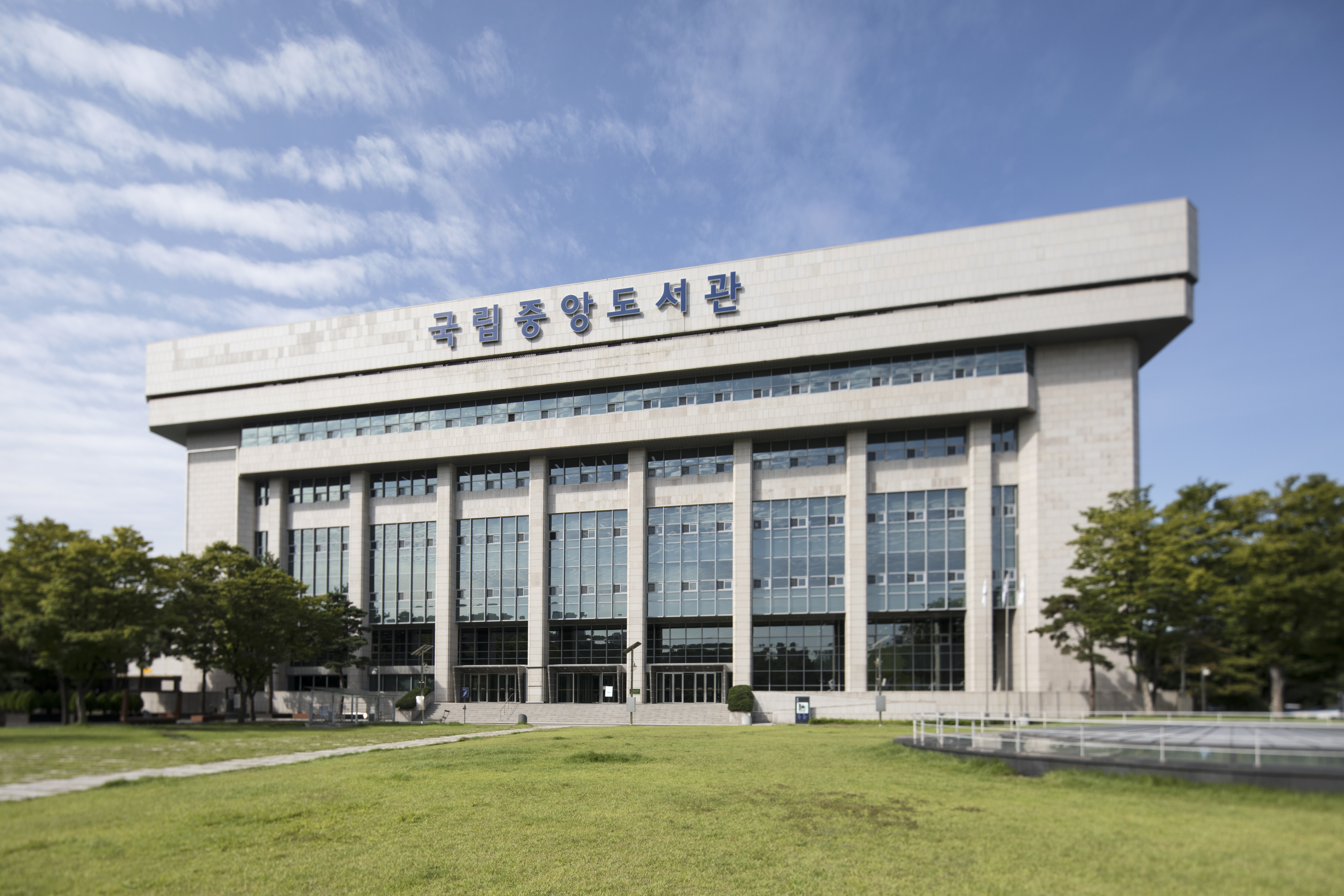
- Library exterior in 2019
- 37°29′51″N 127°0′10″E
- Location: Banpo-dong, Seocho-gu, Seoul, South Korea
- Type: National library
- Established: October 15, 1945 (80 years ago)
- Reference to legal mandate: Statutes of the Republic of Korea, Library Act, Article 18
- Branches: 2

Collection
- Size: 12,565,821
- Legal deposit: Yes (Library Act, Article 20)

Other information
- Director: Suh Hye-ran, Chief Executive
- Website: www.nl.go.kr

Korean name
- Hangul: 국립중앙도서관
- Hanja: 國立中央圖書館
- Lit.: National Central Library
- RR: Gungnip jungang doseogwan
- MR: Kungnip chungang tosŏgwan

The National Library of Korea (Korean: 국립중앙도서관) is located in the Seocho District of Seoul, South Korea. It was established in 1945. It houses more than 10 million volumes, including over 1,134,000 foreign-language books and some of the National Treasures of South Korea. It is also home to the offices of the Korean Library Association.

== History ==
Korea did not have a national modern library until the Korean Empire period. The first modern library on the peninsula was the Daehan Library, which was established in 1906 by Lee Keun-sang, Lee Beom-gu and Yun Chi-ho. However, it was not publicly accessible. Its 100,000 books were eventually confiscated by the government in 1911. The first library that allowed free public access (although it was still privately owned) was called Daedong Seogwan. It also printed its own books. However, the Japanese colonial government eventually limited access to printed materials, including newspapers, magazines, and books. It was then restricted to printing approved media and propaganda.

After the 1919 March 1st Movement protests against colonial rule, the Japanese government-general loosened its restrictions on Korea. As part of this, they constructed the Government-General of Chōsen Library in Sogong-dong, Jung District, Keijō (present-day Seoul) in 1923.

In October 1945, weeks after the liberation of Korea, the National Library of Korea inherited the Government-General of Chōsen Library. Park Bong-seok created it by gathering materials from a number of libraries in the area. He also contributed to the development of a national library system in the South. In 1946, Park created a national library school to train librarians. He also continued consolidating materials from other Korean libraries.

In 1948, a nationwide movement was formed called "One Country, One Library." Its goal was to establish more libraries and preserve materials in the various libraries in the country. They created a program to promote literacy in the Korean script Hangul, which had been variously discouraged or prohibited during the colonial period in favor of the Japanese script. Around this time, only 20% of Koreans could still read Korean. The library joined the International Federation of Library Associations and Institutions in 1955. Since then, the library has conducted various fundraising and educational events. In 1974, it relocated to Namsan-dong, and in 1988 it again relocated to its the present location at Banpo-dong, Seocho District. In 1991, it was transferred from the Ministry of Education to the Ministry of Culture in 1991.

== Description ==
As of November 2020, the library has 12,768,751 items total. 9,158,363 are Korean-language books, 1,552,489 are foreign-language books, 1,771,738 are non-book items, and 286,161 are old texts.

The library also possesses an extensive digital collection, including archives of newspapers and primary sources related to Korean history and society. Many of these resources are freely available online, although some require paid or special permission to access.

The library is served by Seoul Subway Lines 3, 7 and 9 which all connect at Express Bus terminal Station. The library is a no kid zone and prevents children under the age of 16 from entering unless special permission is granted.

== See also ==
- Korean Library Association (KLA)
- National Digital Library of Korea
- National Library for Children and Young Adults
- Information Center on North Korea
- National Assembly Library of Korea
- List of national and state libraries
