= John Wall (philosopher) =

American educator and ethicist

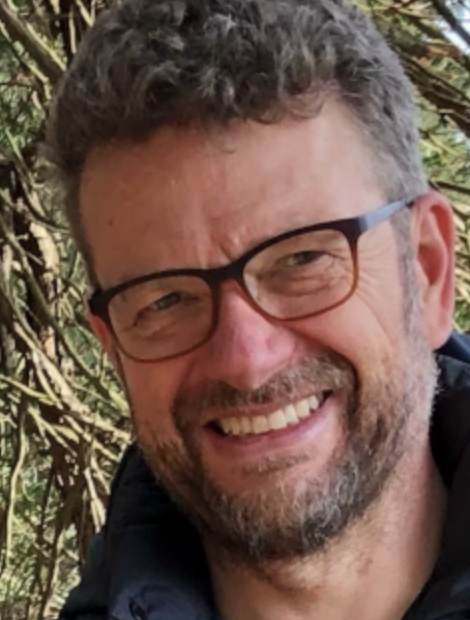
John Wall, 2021

John Wall is an American educator and theoretical ethicist who teaches at Rutgers University Camden. He is director of the Childism Institute and co-director of the Children's Voting Colloquium.

== Research ==
Wall's research focuses on "the groundworks of moral life, particularly their relations to language, power, and childhood" and theoretical work where he argues that "ethical life is fundamentally creative", as well as for his concept of childism, or the empowerment of children by transforming norms.

== Career ==
Wall was born in 1965 in Leeds, United Kingdom and moved to the United States as a teenager. He obtained a BA, MA, and Ph.D. from the University of Chicago and taught for one year at DePaul University before taking up a permanent position at Rutgers University.

At Rutgers University, Wall teaches in the departments of philosophy, religion, and childhood studies. He is the founding director of the Childism Institute and is the co-founder of the Children’s Voting Colloquium. In 2006, Wall assisted in the creation of a childhood studies doctoral program at Rutgers. He was also chair of the Childhood Studies and Religion Group at the American Academy of Religion.

== Bibliography ==
=== Books ===
- Paul Ricoeur and Contemporary Moral Thought (2002, co-editor, Routledge)
- Marriage, Health, and the Professions (2002, co-editor, Eerdmans)
- Moral Creativity: Paul Ricoeur and the Poetics of Possibility (2005, Oxford University Press)
- Ethics in Light of Childhood (2010, Georgetown University Press)
- Children and Armed Conflict (2011, co-editor, Palgrave Macmillan)
- Children’s Rights: Today’s Global Challenge (2017, Rowman & Littlefield)
- Give Children the Vote: On Democratizing Democracy (2022, Bloomsbury Academic)
- Exploring Children's Suffrage: Interdisciplinary Perspectives on Ageless Voting (2022, editor, Palgrave Macmillan)
- The Bloomsbury Handbook of Theories in Childhood Studies (2023, co-editor, Bloomsbury Academic)

=== Journal articles ===
- Wall, John (2008). "Human Rights in Light of Childhood". International Journal of Children's Rights. 16 (4): 523–543. doi:10.1163/157181808X312122.
- Wall, John (2014). "Why Children and Youth Should Have the Right to Vote: An Argument for Proxy-Claim Suffrage". Children, Youth and Environments. 24 (1): 108–123. doi:10.7721/chilyoutenvi.24.1.0108. JSTOR 10.7721/chilyoutenvi.24.1.0108.
- Wall, John (2014). “Democratizing Democracy: The Road from Women’s to Children’s Suffrage”. International Journal of Human Rights, Special Issue, edited by Sonja Grover (2014) 18.6: 646–659.
- Wall, John (2019). ""From Childhood Studies to Childism: Reconstructing Scholarly and Social Imaginations"". Children's Geographies. 17 (6): 1–15. doi:10.1080/14747731.2020.1736853. S2CID 216320258.
- Wall, John (2019). “Theorizing Children’s Global Citizenship: Reconstructionism and the Politics of Deep Interdependence”. Global Studies of Childhood (March 2019) 9(1):5-17.
- Wall, John and Jonathan Josefsson (2020). “Empowered Inclusion: Theorizing Global Justice for Children and Youth”. Globalizations, 2020:1-19. DOI: 10.1080/14747731.2020.1736853.
