= Office of Population Research =

Research center at Princeton University

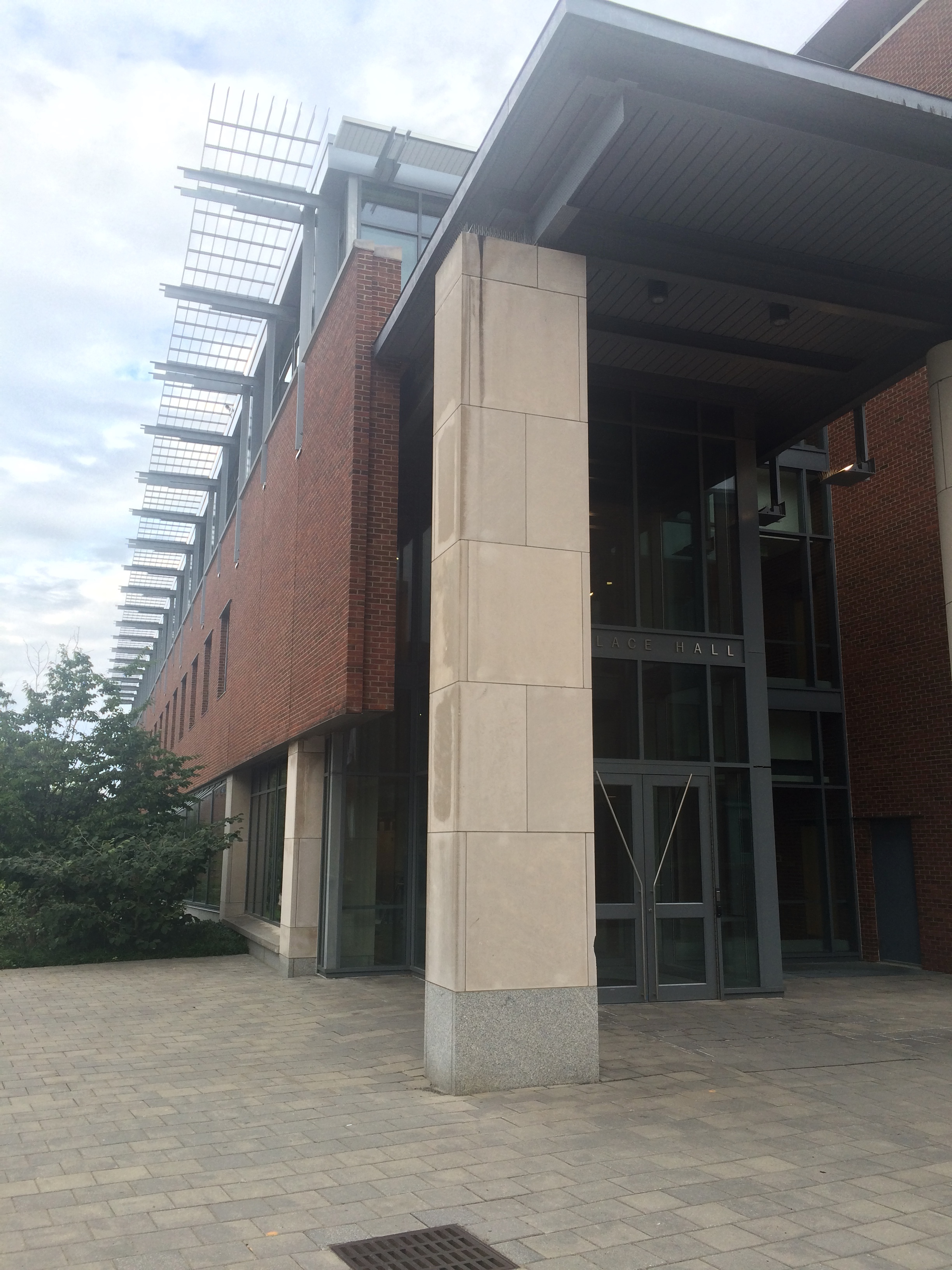
- Wallace Hall, home to the Office of Population Research
- Type: Private
- Established: 1936
- Parent institution: Princeton University
- Director: Dalton Conley
- Faculty: 35 professors, lecturers, and researchers (2026)
- Students: 33 graduate students (2026)
- Location: Princeton, New Jersey, 08544, United States; 40°20′57″N 74°39′13″W
- Website: opr.princeton.edu

The Office of Population Research (OPR) at Princeton University is the oldest population research center in the United States. Founded in 1936, the OPR is a leading demographic research and training center. Recent research activity has primarily focused on healthcare, social demography, urbanization, and migration. The OPR's research has been cited in numerous articles by The New York Times and The Wall Street Journal.

== History ==
Major General, heir, and eugenicist Frederick H. Osborn, a graduate of Princeton University, laid the foundation for the Office of Population Research in 1936. The founding director of OPR was Frank W. Notestein, who was a demographer at the Milbank Memorial Fund, a leading peer-reviewed healthcare journal. While at the OPR, he was also the director of the Population Division of the United Nations between 1946 and 1948. He left in 1959 to lead the Population Council, an international, nonprofit, non-governmental organization. He was succeeded as OPR director by Ansley J. Coale, who held the post from 1959 to 1975. One of the early faculty appointments was Irene Barnes Taeuber, whose scholarly work helped found the science of demography.

The current Director of the OPR is Dalton Conley, an American sociologist and Professor .

== Academics ==
The OPR offers four degrees and certifications for graduate students at Princeton:

- Ph.D. in Demography
- Department Degree with Specialization in Population
- Joint-Degree Program in Demography and Social Policy
- Certificate in Demography

=== Ph.D. in Demography ===
The Ph.D. in Demography enrolls a small number of graduate students with an interest in population research and strong quantitative backgrounds, such as statistics and mathematics. The program allows students to select up to two fields of concentration.

=== Department Degree with Specialization in Population ===
Doctoral candidates in other departments at Princeton are able to work towards a specialization in Population. Most of these students work primarily in the Departments of Economics or Sociology, while some may also come from the Departments of History or Politics.

=== Joint-Degree Program ===
The Joint-Degree Program allows students interested specifically in Social Policy to apply for a specialized program. Students apply after their first or second year of graduate study and must complete additional coursework in “Issues in Inequality and Social Policy,” and “Advanced Empirical Workshop.” In the 2018–2019 academic year, there were nine students concentrating in Social Policy.

=== Certificate in Population Studies ===
The Office of Population Research, in connection with the Program in Population Studies, offers a non-degree Certificate in Demography for students who complete four approved courses, one Independent Reading course, and one elective. Students must complete an individual or joint-research project under the supervision of an OPR faculty or research. Students who complete this certificate are often enrolled in the Master's of Public Administration program at the Princeton School of Public and International Affairs.

== Research ==
=== Research Interests ===
OPR faculty affiliates pursue traditional and cutting edge research and teaching on a range of topics, using a range of quantitative, qualitative, genomic and mixed methodologies in the study of human population in both the US as well as around the world. For example, areas of current research among OPR faculty include poverty, housing and eviction, child wellbeing, bio-social interactions, aging and health across the life course, educational achievement, racial/ethnic inequality, epidemics and pandemics such as HIV/AIDS and COVID-19, and migration and immigration.

=== Affiliations ===
The OPR maintains close relations with other departments within the Princeton School of Public and International Affairs and the Department of Sociology. Because of its inherent interdisciplinary research, OPR works with researchers at Center for Health & Wellbeing (CHW), The Center for Migration & Development (CMD), Center on Contemporary China (CCC), the Eviction Lab and Center for Research on Child & Family Wellbeing (CRCFW).
