= National Library for Children and Young Adults =

Public library in Seoul, South Korea

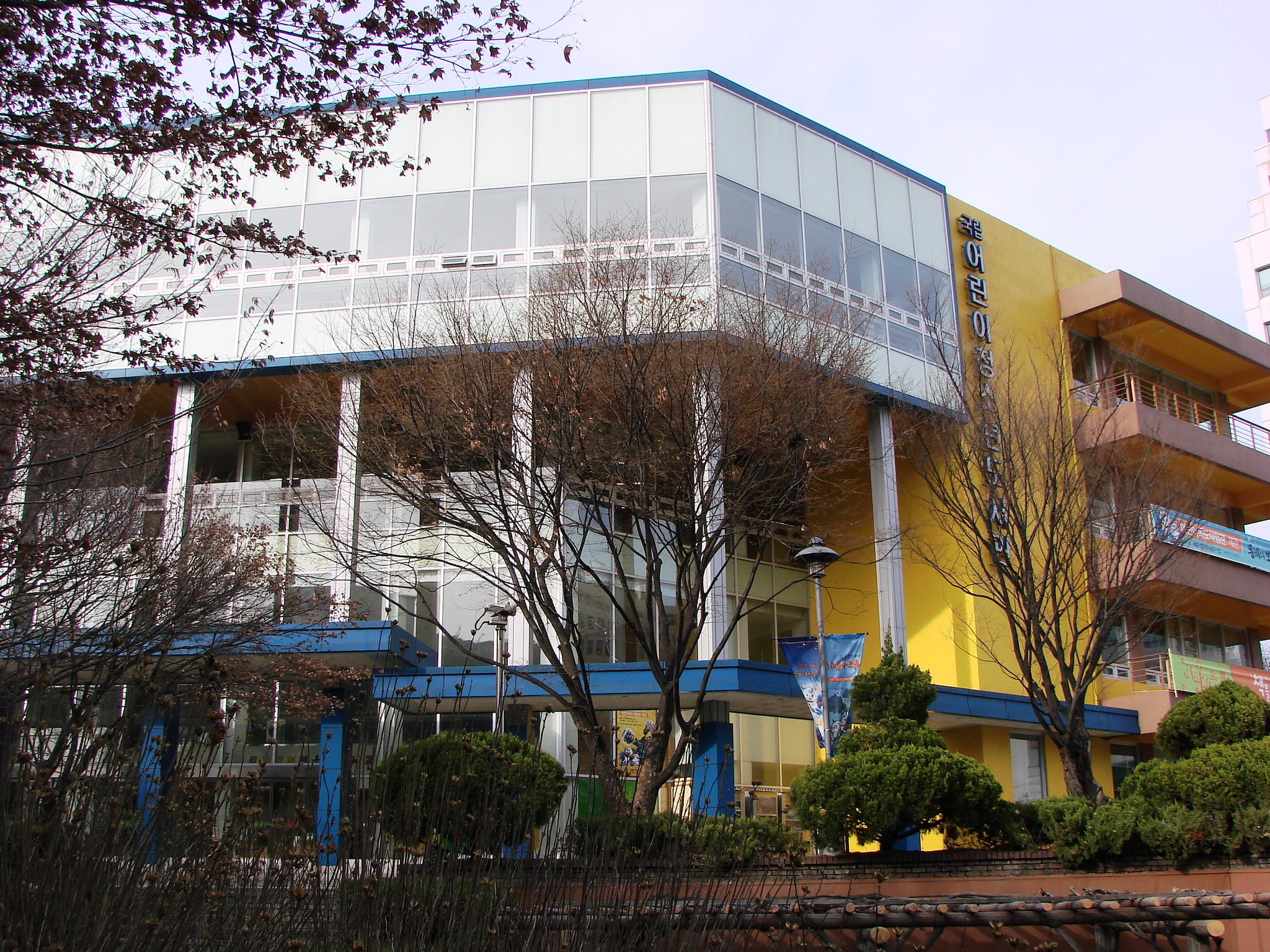
- Location: 21 Teheran-ro 7-gil, Gangnam-gu, Seoul
- Established: 28 June 2006

Collection
- Size: 715,066권

Other information
- Website: www.nlcy.go.kr

Korean name
- Hangul: 국립어린이청소년도서관
- Hanja: 國立어린이靑少年圖書館
- RR: Gungnip eorini cheongsonyeon doseogwan
- MR: Kungnip ŏrini ch'ŏngsonyŏn tosŏgwan

The National Library for Children and Young Adults (NLCY; Korean: 국립어린이청소년도서관) is a branch library of the National Library of Korea, that aims to provide information services and reading promotion services to children and young adults, located in Tehaeran-ro 7-gil, Gangnam-gu, Seoul.

As Korea's representative library specialized for children and young adults, NLCY was opened on 28 June 2006. Because the six-story library building (4 ground floors and 2 underground floors) is located near Gangnam Station, it provides easy access to people of all ages, including children, young adults, and adults. The library collects knowledge and information resources on children and young adult fields and as of May 2021, the library is in possession of 715,066 volumes in total; including 520,851 volumes of oriental books, 80,400 volumes of western books, 17,459 volumes of periodicals, 96,356 units of non-books. The collection covers not only children and young adult materials, but also research materials for researchers in the relevant field. Also, NLCY implements projects to develop reading culture contents for children and young adults and to support local public libraries and school libraries.

Aiming to cultivate human resources with creativity and convergence in relation to the Fourth Industrial Revolution, NLCY opened the Future Dream Hope Factory - a library makerspace – and runs various library-based creative programs that graft books and ICT. In 2020, the AR Center was established within the library in order to provide tangible reading activities for children and young adults in the Fourth Industrial Revolution and 5G Era, and programs with convergence contents featuring 'books' and 'stories' are developed and run in the Center.

== History ==
2004 Conducted a study on the operation of the National Library for Children and Young Adults

2005 Inauguration of the Founding TF of the National Library for Children and Young Adults

2006 Opening of the National Library for Children and Young Adults

2009 Opening of the Interactive Storytelling Room and Dokdo Experiencing Room

2011 Installation of the Ma Hae Song Private Collection

2012 Installation of the Cho Heun Pa Private Collection

2017 Installation of the Hong Sung Chan Private Collection

2019 Opening of the Future Dream Hope Factory

2020 Establishment of the AR Center

== Organization ==
=== Director General ===
- Administration Division
  - Receipt and sending, controlling, release and preservation of documents
  - Issues on personnel affairs, office regulations, education and training, pension, and civil complaint
  - Security; and official seal and compilation
  - Salary; and budget, accounting and settlement of accounts
  - Management of national property and goods
  - Duties on parking lots and vehicle operation
  - Management on building and facilities
  - Adjustment, review and analysis of project plans
  - Establishment, revision, abolition of provision by statute
  - Issues that are not under provision of other divisions
- Planning and Cooperation Division
  - Planning and implementation of library development
  - Duties on reading promotion for children and young adults
  - Cooperation and providing support to domestic related organizations
  - Issues on operation of the Library Service Counsel for Children and Young Adults
  - Exchange and cooperation with oversea libraries for children and young adults
  - Tasks related to strengthening the ability of librarians who serve children and young adults
  - Public relations affairs
  - Release and supply of the NLCY periodical The Library Story
- Library Service Division
  - Operation of the collection rooms at the library
  - Research and provision on reference in the children and young adult fields
  - Acquisition
  - Management and operation of the stocks
  - Running reading culture programs
  - Data processing and digitization
  - Library tour

== Floor plans ==
- 1F: Children's Collection, Dream Makerspace, Family Makerspace, Lactation Room, and Information Desk
- 2F: Hope Makerspace, Interactive Storytelling Room, Space Imagination, Space Hope, and Exhibition Hall
- 3F: Research Materials, and Stacks
- 4F: Picture Book Room with AR (Augmented Reality), Reading Discussion Rooms, Seminar Room, and Auditorium
- B1: AR (Augmented Reality) in Library, and Children's Dokdo Experience Room LIVEary
- B2: Library Cafeteria (currently closed due to COVID-19)

== Collection Statistics ==
- Oriental books (Total: 520,851)
  - Humanities: 348,313
  - Social science: 71,069
  - Natural science: 101,469
- Western books (Total: 80,400)
  - Humanities: 66,098
  - Social science: 7,915
  - Natural science: 6,387
- Periodicals (Total: 17,459)
  - Humanities: 12,943
  - Social science: 3,994
  - Natural science: 522
- Non-books (Total: 96,356)
  - Humanities: 72,501
  - Social science: 14,886
  - Natural science: 8,969

== See also ==
- National Library of Korea

== Press releases ==
- 100 books recommended by the National Library for Children and Young Adults
- A national library for children and Young adults
