= Childism =

Advocacy for empowering children

Childism has two different usages. Childism can refer to advocating for empowering children as a subjugated group, operate as a positive term for a movement, akin to feminism. Childism can also refer to discrimination against children, as a critical term for prejudice and discrimination against children, akin to racism. Both usages may be connected with critical theories and intersectionality, and furthermore with feminism, decolonialism and environmentalism, ageism, adultism and patriarchy.

The term "childism" was invented by Chester M. Pierce and Gail B. Allen in 1975 to equate the routinely negative and destructive treatment of children ("microaggressions") with everyday acts of racism. Elizabeth Young-Bruehl's "Childism" (2012) developed the Pierce-Allen construct to explore how childist, racist and sexist forms of prejudice motivate multi-abuse of children. In 2019, John Wall, founder of the Rutgers-based Childism Institute, redefined childism ("like feminism but for children") and distinguished it from Childhood Studies by its focus on activism. Childism in its original sense of discrimination against children provides a critical theoretical lens used in interdisciplinary studies and in critical child rights theory to explore intersectional forms of discrimination against children as a heterogenous group.
