= List of Nazi doctors =

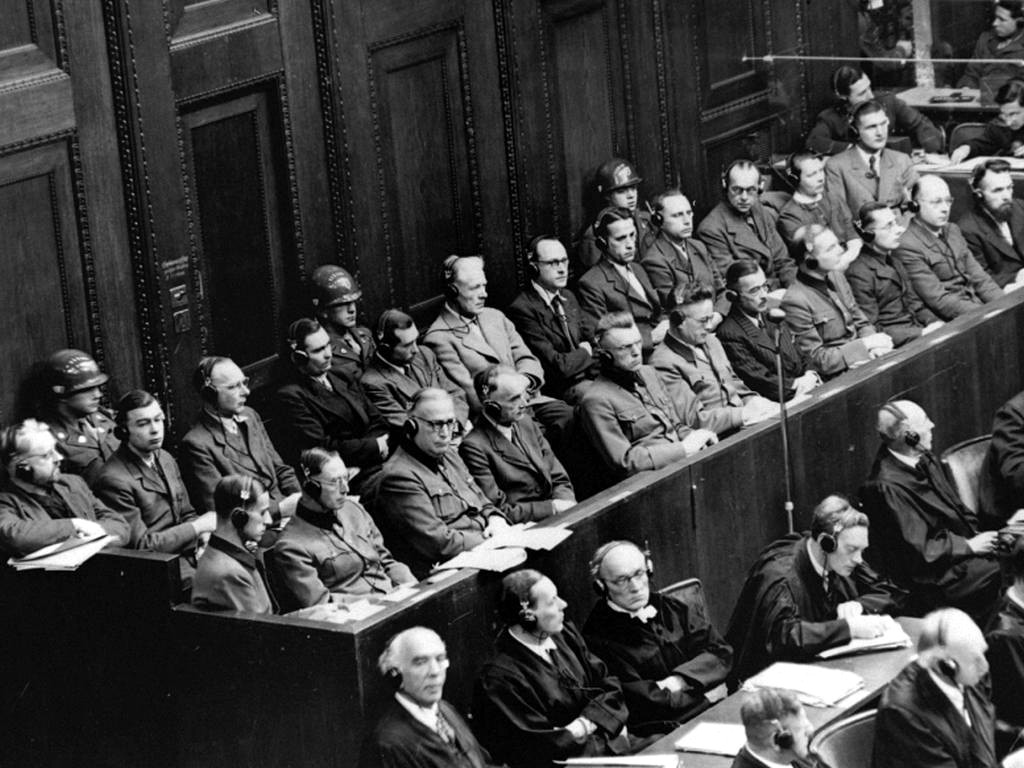
Doctors' trial, Nuremberg, 1946–1947

The following is a list of notable physicians in Nazi Germany. This list is primarily split up into those who performed euthanasia through the Aktion T4 campaign, to those who primarily performed experiments on Holocaust victims. While a majority consists of members of the Nazi Party, others who could not become members contributed in notable ways. After the war, the German Medical Association blamed Nazi atrocities on a small group of 350 criminal doctors. During the Doctors' trial, the defense argued that there was no international law to distinguish between legal and illegal human experimentation, which led to the creation of the Nuremberg Code (1947). Some doctors attempted to change names to escape capture and trial, such as Werner Heyde and Robert Ley, Other doctors, such as Walter Schreiber, were covertly moved to the United States during "Operation Paperclip" in 1951.

- Note: Some of those listed here were acquitted of the more serious charges, but were still found guilty for other crimes.

== Background ==
When the Nazi government came to power, they purged Germany of its 6,000 to 7,000 Jewish doctors. Non-Jewish physicians were early recruits to the Nazi Party, due both to social and economic circumstances and to widespread eugenic and Social Darwinist ideas in early-20th-century medicine. By 1942, more than half of all German physicians had become Nazi Party members. In comparison, only about 10% of the general population became Nazi Party members by 1945. In addition, over 7% of German doctors became members of the Nazi SS, compared to less than 1% of the general population. While most of these doctors were physicians, some held doctorates (PhDs) in biology, anthropology, or related fields. Doctors who were working for the state, and not for their patients, using a Mendelian type of logic chart, saw extermination of their patients as the correct solution to the problem of mental illness and the genetically defective. "The participation in the ‘betrayal of Hippocrates’ had a broad basis within the German medical profession. Without the doctors' active help, the Holocaust could not have happened," wrote E Ernst in the International Journal of Epidemiology. Killing and experimentation became medical procedures as they were performed by licensed doctors. A doctor was present at all the mass killings for legal reasons.

== Euthanasia ==
Doctor	Birth	Death	Position
Erich Bauer	March 26, 1900	February 4, 1980	T4-personnel
Ernst Baumhard	March 3, 1911	June 24, 1943	T4-Gutachter
August Becker	August 17, 1900	December 31, 1967	T4-Chemist
Oskar Begusch	January 21, 1897	January 11, 1944	T4-Gutachter
Friedrich Berner	November 12, 1904	March 2, 1945	T4-Gassing doctor
Hans Bertha	April 14, 1901	January 3, 1964	T4-Gutachter
Kurt Borm	August 25, 1909	2001	T4-Gassing doctor
Viktor Brack	November 9, 1904	June 2, 1948	T4-Organizer
Heinrich Bunke	July 24, 1914	September 16, 2001	T4-Gassing doctor
Werner Catel	June 27, 1894	April 30, 1981	T4-Gutachter (Children)
Fritz Cropp	October 25, 1887	April 6, 1984	T4-Organizer
Max de Crinis	May 29, 1889	May 2, 1945	T4-Gutachter
Irmfried Eberl	September 8, 1910	February 16, 1948	T4-Director
Klaus Endruweit	December 6, 1913	September 3, 1994	T4-personnel
Valentin Faltlhauser	November 28, 1876	January 8, 1961	T4-Gutachter
Emil Gelny	March 28, 1890	March 28, 1961	T4-Gassing doctor
Hans Bodo Gorgaß	June 19, 1909	October 10, 1993	T4-Gassing doctor
Ernst-Robert Grawitz	June 8, 1899	April 24, 1945	T4-personnel
Heinrich Gross	November 14, 1915	December 15, 2005	T4-personnel
Ernst Hefter	January 11, 1906	April 11, 1947	T4-Gutachter
Hans Heinze	October 18, 1895	February 4, 1983	T4-Gutachter (Children)
Günther Hennecke	August 11, 1912	November 21, 1943	T4-personnel
Werner Heyde (Fritz Sawade)	April 25, 1902	February 13, 1964	T4-Obergutachter
Ernst Illing	April 6, 1904	November 30, 1946	T4-Child euthanasia
Erwin Jekelius	June 5, 1905	May 8, 1952	T4-Gutachter
Alfons Klein	June 8, 1909	March 14, 1946	T4-Director
Herbert Linden	September 14, 1899	April 27, 1945	T4-Obergutachter
Rudolf Lonauer	January 9, 1907	May 5, 1945	T4-Gutachter
Friedrich Mauz	May 1, 1900	July 7, 1979	T4-Gutachter
Friedrich Mennecke	October 6, 1904	January 28, 1947	T4-Gutachter
Paul (Hermann) Nitsche	November 25, 1876	March 25, 1948	T4-Obergutachter
Friedrich Panse	December 31, 1899	December 6, 1973	T4-Gutachter
Hermann Pfannmüller	June 8, 1886	April 10, 1961	T4-Gutachter
Kurt Pohlisch	March 28, 1893	February 6, 1955	T4-Gutachter
Georg Renno	January 13, 1907	October 4, 1997	T4-Gutachter
Carl-Heinz Rodenberg	November 19, 1904	1995	T4-Gutachter
Curt Schmalenbach	February 24, 1910	June 15, 1944	T4-Gutachter
Carl Schneider	December 19, 1891	December 11, 1946	T4-Gutachter
Aquilin Ullrich	March 14, 1914	May 30, 2001	T4-personnel
Werner Villinger	October 9, 1887	August 8, 1961	T4-Gutachter
Adolf Wahlmann	December 10, 1876	November 1, 1956	T4-Chief doctor
Erich Wasicky	May 27, 1911	May 28, 1947	T4-Gassing doctor
Ernst Wentzler	September 3, 1891	August 9, 1973	T4-Gutachter (Children)
Albert Widmann	June 8, 1912	December 24, 1986	T4-personnel (Children)
Gerhard Wischer	February 1, 1903	November 4, 1950	T4-Gutachter
Waldemar Wolter	May 19, 1908	May 28, 1947	Euthanasia
Ewald Wortmann	April 17, 1911	September 15, 1985	Euthanasia

== Human experimentation ==
Doctor	Birth	Death	Type(s)	Sentence (Note: These are initial sentences, many of which were later commuted.)	Reference(s)
Karl Babor	August 23, 1918	January 18, 1964	Injections	None (suicide)	
Heinz Baumkötter	February 7, 1912	April 21, 2001	Unknown	25 years	
Hermann Becker-Freyseng	July 18, 1910	August 27, 1961	High-altitude experiments	20 years	
Wilhelm Beiglböck	October 10, 1905	November 22, 1963	Sea water experiments	15 years	
Otto Bickenbach	March 11, 1901	November 26, 1971	Poison gas experiments	Life	
Kurt Blome	January 31, 1894	October 10, 1969	Multiple	Acquitted (Note: American intervention possibly saved Blome from the gallows in exchange for information about biological warfare, nerve gas, and providing advice on to the American chemical and biological weapons programs.)	
Karl Brandt	January 8, 1904	June 2, 1948	Injections	Executed	
Carl Clauberg	September 28, 1898	August 9, 1957	Sterilization experiments	25 years	
Leonardo Conti	August 24, 1900	October 6, 1945	Unknown	None (suicide)	
Hans Delmotte	December 15, 1917	January 31, 1945	Injections	None (suicide)	
Erwin (Oskar) Ding-Schuler	September 19, 1912	August 11, 1945	Injections	None (suicide)	
Hans Eisele	March 13, 1913	May 3, 1967	Surgical experiments	Death	
Friedrich Entress	December 8, 1914	May 28, 1947	Injections	Executed	
Hans Eppinger	January 5, 1879	September 25, 1946	Sea water experiments	None (suicide)	
Fritz Fischer	October 5, 1912	2003 (Note: Exact date unknown)	Surgical experiments	Life	
Karl (Franz) Gebhardt	November 23, 1897	June 2, 1948	Injections & surgical ex.	Executed	
Karl (August) Genzken	June 8, 1885	October 10, 1957	Injections	Life	
Kurt Gutzeit	June 2, 1893	October 28, 1957	None directly (Note: Gutzeit was involved in the coordination of pseudo-medical infection tests with hepatitis.)	None	
Eugen Haagen	June 17, 1898	August 3, 1972	Injections	20 years	
Julius Hallervorden	October 21, 1882	May 29, 1965	Post-mortem brain research	None	
Siegfried Handloser	March 25, 1885	July 3, 1954	None directly (Note: Handloser held the newly established position of Chief of Wehrmacht Medical Services in the Wehrmacht High Command (OKW). This made him primarily responsible for the entire medical service of the Wehrmacht and consequently also for all medical crimes that were committed within the framework of the Wehrmacht medical service, particularly against prisoners of war.)	None	
Aribert (Ferdinand) Heim	June 28, 1914	August 10, 1992	Injections	Escaped	
Kurt Heissmeyer	December 26, 1905	August 29, 1967	Injections	Life	
Fritz Hintermayer	October 28, 1911	May 29, 1946	Injections	Executed	
Erich Hippke	March 7, 1888	June 10, 1969	None directly (Note: Hippke was arrested, but later was released after it was found he was only the source behind the idea for deadly "freezing experiments" on humans.)	None	
Ernst Holzlöhner	February 23, 1899	June 14, 1945	Freezing experiments	None (suicide)	
Waldemar Hoven	February 10, 1903	June 2, 1948	Injections	Executed	
Emil Kaschub	April 3, 1919	May 4, 1977	Injections	None (Note: Kaschub died before charges could be brought up against him.)	
Hans Wilhelm König	May 13, 1912	1991	Injections	Escaped	
Eduard Krebsbach	August 8, 1894	May 28, 1947	Injections	Executed	
Johann (Paul) Kremer	December 26, 1883	January 8, 1965	Starvation experiments	Death	
Josef Mengele	March 16, 1911	February 7, 1979	Multiple	Escaped	
Joachim Mrugowsky	August 15, 1905	June 2, 1948	Injections	Executed	
Heinrich Mückter	June 14, 1912	May 22, 1987	Unknown	Escaped	
Herta Oberheuser	May 15, 1911	January 24, 1978	Sulfonamide experiments	20 years	
Helmut Poppendick	January 6, 1902	January 11, 1994	None directly (Note: The courts found that Poppendick was aware of almost all the experiments that had been carried out on prisoners in various concentration camps, but saw no criminal liability. He was ultimately sentenced to 10 years for being a member of the SS.)	10 years	
Sigmund Rascher	February 12, 1909	April 26, 1945	Multiple	None (Note: Rascher never stood trial, he was executed under direct orders from Heinrich Himmler for deception)	
Hans (Conrad Julius) Reiter	February 26, 1881	November 25, 1969	None directly (Note: Reiter was a "quality control" officer who helped design and implement a process where internees were inoculated with an experimental typhus vaccine. He later assisted the Allies with his knowledge of germ warfare.)	Minimal	
Heinrich Rindfleisch	March 3, 1916	January 14, 1969	Unknown	None	
Hans-Wolfgang Romberg	May 15, 1911	September 6, 1981	High-altitude experiments	Acquitted	
Gerhard Rose	November 30, 1896	January 13, 1992	Injections	Life	
Rolf Rosenthal	January 22, 1911	May 3, 1947	Injections & surgical ex.	Executed	
Paul Rostock	January 18, 1892	June 17, 1956	None directly (Note: Rostock was charged with complicity in several series of human experiments on concentration camp prisoners due to his high position.)	Acquitted	
Helmut Rühl	January 14, 1918	Unknown	Poison gas experiments	Death (IA)	
Siegfried Ruff	February 19, 1907	April 22, 1989	High-altitude experiments	Acquitted	
Konrad Schäfer	January 7, 1911	1951	Unknown	Acquitted	
Gerhard Schiedlausky	January 14, 1906	May 3, 1947	Injections & surgical ex.	Executed	
Klaus Schilling	July 5, 1871	May 28, 1946	Malaria experiments	Executed	
Oskar Schröder	February 6, 1891	January 26, 1959	Sea water experiments	Life	
Horst Schumann	May 1, 1906	May 5, 1983	X-ray sterilization ex.	None	
Heinrich Schütz	April 12, 1906	November 12, 1986	Biochemical experiments	10 years	
Walter Sonntag	May 13, 1907	September 17, 1948	Injections	Executed	
Percival Treite	September 10, 1911	April 8, 1947	Unknown	None (suicide)	
Alfred Trzebinski	August 29, 1902	October 8, 1946	Injections	Executed	
Carl (Peter) Værnet	April 28, 1893	November 25, 1965	Injections	Escaped	
Helmuth Vetter	March 21, 1910	February 2, 1949	Injections	Executed	
Bruno (Nikolaus Maria) Weber	May 21, 1915	September 23, 1956	None directly (Note: Weber experimented with blood which was drawn by inmate physician Dr. Slavka Kleinová.)	None	
Georg August Weltz	March 16, 1889	August 22, 1963	High-altitude experiments	Acquitted	
Wilhelm Witteler	April 20, 1909	May 13, 1993	None directly (Note: Witteler was involved in the selection of prisoners who were deliberately infected during Claus Schilling's malaria experiments.)	Death	
Eduard Wirths	September 4, 1909	September 20, 1945	None directly (Note: Wirths was involved in ordering medical experimentation, particularly in gynecological and typhus-related experimental tests.)	None (suicide)	

== Others ==
=== Academics ===
Doctor	Birth	Death	Short summary
Kurt Albrecht	December 31, 1894	May 7, 1945	Albrecht was a professor at the University of Berlin, and Karl-Ferdinands-Universität in Prague.
Eugen Fischer	July 5, 1874	July 9, 1967	Fischer developed the physiological specifications, such as skull dimensions, which were used to determine racial origins, and he also developed the so-called Fischer–Saller scale for hair colour. He and the members of his team experimented on Gypsies and African-Germans, drawing their blood and measuring their skulls (see Craniometry) to attempt to scientifically validate his theories.
Wilhelm Frick	March 12, 1877	October 16, 1946	He achieved a doctorate of law and began working for the police in 1903. Later became a politician of the Nazi Party, joining September 1, 1925. He was a contributing creator and writer of the Nuremberg Laws. He was tried and executed after the war.
Rudolf Hippius	June 9, 1905	October 23, 1945	Hippius is best known for his work in "racial psychology" carried out under the auspices of the Nazi regime, and specifically his study of the "suitability" of people of mixed German and Slavonic descent.
Alfred Ploetz	August 22, 1860	March 20, 1940	Ploetz was a eugenicist known for coining the term racial hygiene (Rassenhygiene), a form of eugenics, and for promoting the concept in Germany.
Robert Ritter	May 14, 1901	April 15, 1951	Ritter was appointed head of the Racial Hygiene and Demographic Biology Research Unit of Nazi Germany's Criminal Police. He was the "architect of the experiments, the Roma and Sinti were subjected to." His pseudo-scientific "research" in classifying these populations of Germany aided the Nazi government in their systematic persecution toward a goal of "racial purity".
Ernst Rüdin	April 19, 1874	October 22, 1952	While Rüdin has been credited as a pioneer of psychiatric inheritance studies, he also argued for, designed, justified, and funded the mass sterilization and clinical killing of adults and children.
Wilhelm Stuckart	16 November 1902	15 November 1953	He achieved a doctorate of law in 1930. He worked as a lawyer for the Nazi Party and helped to create and write the Nuremberg Laws.
Otmar Freiherr von Verschuer	July 16, 1896	August 8, 1969	Verschuer was a Nazi-affiliated eugenicist with an interest in racial hygiene. He was an advocate of compulsory sterilization programs in the first half of the 20th century.

=== Camp doctors ===
Doctor	Birth	Death	Short summary
Martin Hellinger	July 17, 1904	August 13, 1988	Hellinger was a member of the Nazi party, who primarily dealt with removing dental gold from those killed at Ravensbrück. During his trial, he claimed that he believed the deceased had been legally executed. On February 3, 1947, he was initially sentenced to 15 years in prison, which was later reduced to time served on May 20, 1954. He re-established his dental practice afterwards until his death.
Wilhelm Jobst	October 27, 1912	May 28, 1947	Jobst was a physician accused of giving injections to terminally ill prisoners in his capacity as camp doctor in Ebensee from 1944 to 1945. He was sentenced to death by hanging on May 13, 1946, and was executed in the following year.
Bruno Kitt	August 9, 1906	October 8, 1946	Bruno Kitt was a camp doctor at Auschwitz and Neuengamme after being drafted into the Waffen-SS in March 1942. He was found guilty of participating in the murder and mistreatment of prisoners at the Neuengamme concentration camp and was sentenced to death by hanging on May 3, 1946.
Fritz Klein	November 24, 1888	December 13, 1945	From December 15, 1943, to January 1945, Klein worked at Auschwitz, Birkenau, Neuengamme, and finally Bergen-Belsen as a camp doctor. During his trial, Anita Lasker testified that Klein took part in selections for the gas chamber. Klein was found guilty and was executed by hanging on December 13, 1945.
Franz Lucas	September 15, 1911	December 7, 1994	Franz Lucas worked at Theresienstadt, Mauthausen, Stutthof, and Ravensbrück from mid-December 1943 to late summer 1944. After fleeing west from the Battle of Berlin he was later arrested, and stood trial in Frankfurt. Lucas was found guilty of selecting at least one thousand people in at least four separate selections, and was sentenced on August 20, 1965, to a total of three years and three months imprisonment. After his release, Lucas worked in his private practice until his death on December 7, 1994.
Hans Münch	May 14, 1911	January 27, 2001	Hans was also known as The Good Man of Auschwitz, and worked there as an SS physician from 1943 to 1945 in German occupied Poland. He was acquitted of war crimes at a 1947 trial in Kraków. While Münch made several public remarks later in his life that appeared to support Nazi ideology, it was determined by courts that he was suffering from Alzheimer's. He died in 2001 at the age of 90.
Ernst (Heinrich) Schmidt	March 27, 1912	November 28, 2000	Throughout the war, Schmidt was a camp physician at Buchenwald, Majdanek, Gross-Rosen, Dachau, Boelke Kaserne subcamp, and Bergen-Belsen. After the war, Schmidt testified as a witness in the Belsen Trial on October 25, 1945. Although Schmidt himself was tried in 1947 and 1975 for complicity in war crimes, he was twice acquitted. He later lived in Uetze and died in 2000 in Celle.
Heinz Thilo	October 8, 1911	May 13, 1945	Thilo initially worked as a gynaecologist for the Lebensborn organization. He was later assigned to the Auschwitz concentration camp in July 1942, where he was one of the physicians commonly performing the "selections" for gassing. Thilo also participated in the liquidation of the Theresienstadt family camp on July 10–11, 1944, and was transferred to Gross-Rosen where he later served as camp physician until February 1945. After being arrested post-war, Thilo committed suicide in prison.
Adolf Winkelmann	March 26, 1887	February 1, 1947	Winkelmann worked as a medical officer in Częstochowa until December 1, 1944, having reached a peak rank of Hauptsturmführer. After brief assignments at the Groß-Rosen and Sachsenhausen concentration camps, he was later transferred to the Ravensbrück concentration camp at the end of February 1945. After the war, Winkelmann was charged with war crimes but died of a heart attack on February 1, 1947, during trial proceedings.

=== Miscellaneous ===
Doctor	Birth	Death	Known for (Note: This only covers what the person did or allegedly did under the Nazi regime.)
Otto Ambros	May 19, 1901	July 23, 1990	Chemist and slave labor
Hans Ehlich	July 1, 1901	March 30, 1991	RSHA physician
Willi Enke	March 6, 1895	December 24, 1974	Pneumoencephalography
Carl (Karl) Krauch	April 7, 1887	February 3, 1968	Chemist and slave labor
Theodor (Gilbert) Morell	July 22, 1886	May 26, 1948	Adolf Hitler's physician
Walter (Paul Emil) Schreiber	March 21, 1893	September 5, 1970	Physician and witness
Erich Traub	June 27, 1906	May 18, 1985	Lab chief - bioweapons
Gerhard Wagner	August 18, 1888	March 25, 1939	Compulsory sterilization
Friedrich Wegener	April 7, 1907	July 9, 1990	Autopsies on Jewish concentration camp inmates

=== Non-Nazis ===
While the following people were never members of the Nazi Party, their names are included here as they are known to have contributed or are mentioned in a notable way.

Doctor	Birth	Death	Short summary
Hans Asperger	February 18, 1906	October 21, 1980	Asperger's alleged Nazi involvement has been hotly debated as his knowledge and involvement remains unknown.
Alfred Erich Hoche	August 1, 1865	May 16, 1943	While never a party member, Hoche is known for his writings about eugenics and euthanasia.
Yusuf (Bey Murad) Ibrahim	May 27, 1877	February 3, 1953	Ibrahim was associated with Action T4 to an unknown extent. He could not become a member of the Nazi Party due to his half Arabic background
Adolf Pokorny	July 25, 1895	Unknown	Pokorny's entry into the NSDAP in 1939 failed because of Lilly Pokorná's (his ex-wife) Jewish origins.
Gustav Wilhelm Schübbe	March 31, 1910	April 12, 1976	While Schübbe was a witness during the Nuremberg trials, he also admitted to killing thousands of people. He was never a party member himself, and charges against him were later dropped.
Hubertus Strughold	June 15, 1898	September 25, 1986	While Strughold never joined the Nazi Party, his association permanently tarnished his legacy.
Marianne Türk	May 31, 1914	January 11, 2003	Türk was involved with Child euthanasia. During her interrogation at the Vienna People's Court on October 16, 1945, the doctor stated that she was neither interested in politics nor belonged to a political organization. She was given a 10-year sentence for being dependent on her superior.

== See also ==
=== Articles ===
- Action 14f13
- Collaboration with the Axis powers
- Glossary of Nazi Germany
- The Holocaust
- Holocaust victims
- Mass suicides in 1945 Nazi Germany
- Nazi eugenics
- Responsibility for the Holocaust
- Antisemitism in health care

=== Lists ===
- List of Axis personnel indicted for war crimes
- List of major perpetrators of the Holocaust
- List of medical eponyms with Nazi associations
- List of Nazi concentration camps
- List of Nazi extermination camps and euthanasia centers
- List of Nazi Party leaders and officials
- List of last surviving Nazi war criminals
