= T4-Gutachter =

Medical experts who carried out the Action T4 euthanasia program

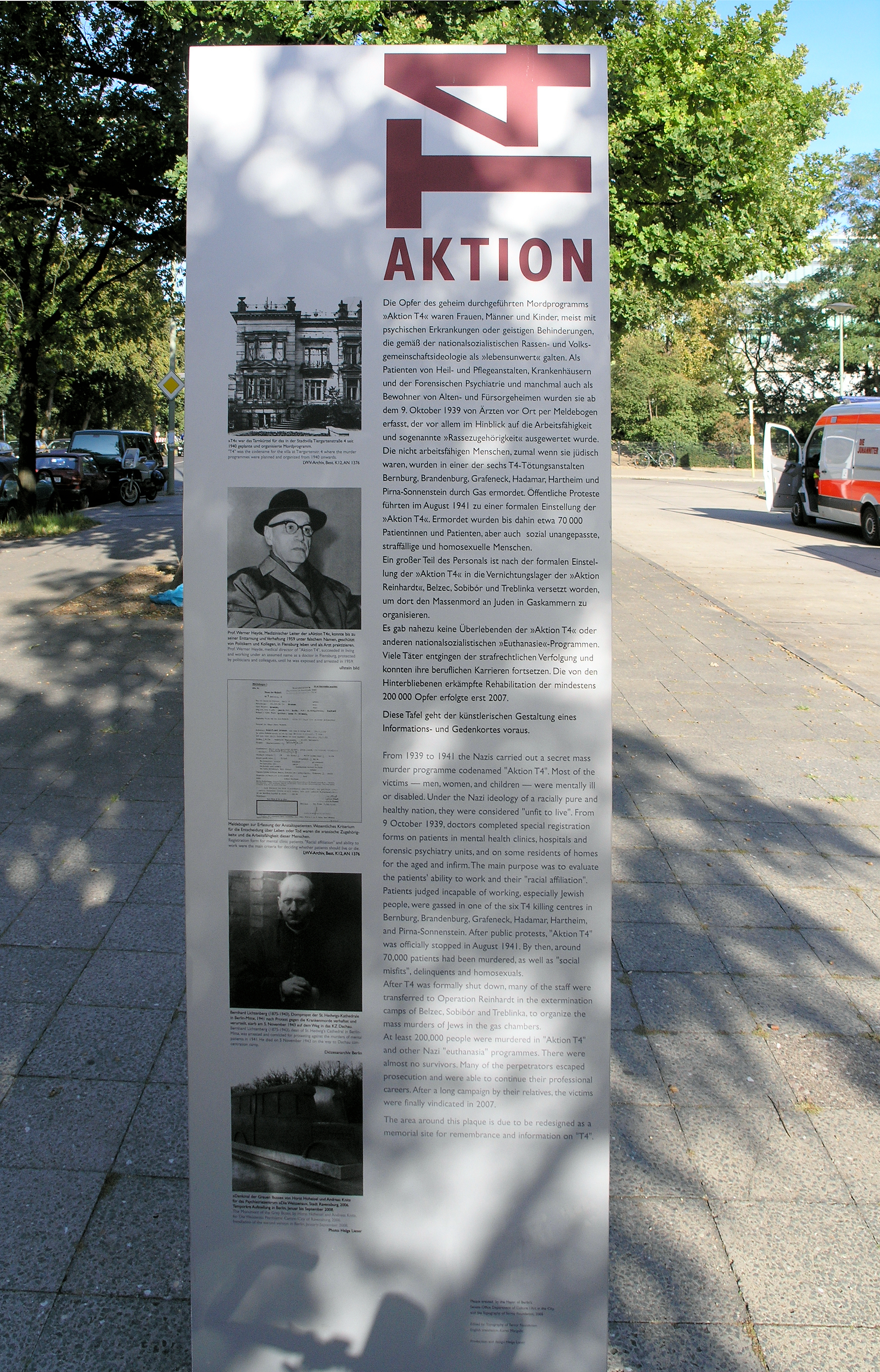
Action T4 marker (2009) in Berlin

The T4-Gutachter (in English, 'Action T4 experts') were medical experts who were employed by the Zentraldienststelle-T4 to organize and carry out the Action T4 euthanasia program in Nazi Germany. Based on reporting forms with information about the mentally ill and disabled, they decided who would be killed in "euthanasia" centers. An internal document from the organization shows a list of 40 physicians who were among those who worked for Action T4.

== List of Action T4 experts ==
Doctor	Lifespan	Period as expert
Pfannmüller, Hermann (DE)	8 June 1886 – 10 April 1961	From 17 November 1939
Wagenknecht, Ernst	23 October 1880 – ?	17 November 1939 – 16 February 1940
Hefter, Ernst (DE)	11 January 1906 – 11 April 1947	From 17 November 1939
Heinze, Hans	18 October 1895 – 2 February 1983	From 17 November 1939
Kaldewey, Walter (DE)	10 December 1896 – 13 January 1954	28 February 1940 – 29 January 1941
Carl-Heinz Rodenberg	19 November 1904 – 1995	28 February 1940 – 14 October 1940
Schreck, Arthur (DE)	15 August 1878 – 3 October 1963	28 February 1940 – 30 November 1940
Steinmeyer, Theodor (DE)	7 December 1897 – 26 May 1945	From 28 February 1940
Hermann Paul Nitsche	25 November 1876 – 25 March 1947	From 28 February 1940
Mennecke, Friedrich (DE)	6 October 1904 – 28 December 1947	From 28 February 1940
Friedrich Panse	30 March 1899 – 6 December 1973	14 May 1940 – 16 December 1940
Carl Schneider	19 December 1891 – 11 December 1946	From 20 April 1940
Pohlisch, Kurt (DE)	28 March 1893 – 6 February 1955	30 April 1940 – 6 January 1941
Zucker, Konrad (DE)	7 December 1893 – 31 August 1978	From 8 May 1940
Renno, Georg (DE)	13 January 1907 – 4 October 1997	From 31 May 1940
Reisch, Otto (DE)	23 October 1891 – 1977	30 April 1940 – 2 July 1940
Hebold, Otto (DE)	27 July 1896 – 4 January 1975	From 8 May 1940
Lonauer, Rudolf (DE)	9 January 1907 – 5 May 1945	From 9 May 1940
Schmitz, Hans-Alois	1 July 1899 – 6 March 1973	30 July 1940 – 14 November 1940
Kihn, Berthold (DE)	10 March 1895 – 19 January 1964	From 5 June 1940
Munckwitz, Günter	13 March 1912 – 1970	25 July 1940 – 31 January 1941
Schumacher, Wilhelm	19 November 1908 – ?	From 5 August 1940
Begusch, Oskar (DE)	21 January 1897 – 11 January 1944	2 September 1940 – 4 July 1941
Sorger, Ernst (DE)	19 November 1892 – 9 August 1945	2 September 1940 – 8 March 1941
Schmidt, Walter (DE)	9 July 1910 – 31 January 1970	2 September 1940 – December 1940
Friedrich Mauz	1 May 1900 – 7 July 1979	From 6 September 1940
Faltlhauser, Valentin (DE)	28 November 1876 – 8 January 1961	From 6 September 1940
Heene, Hanns	11 August 1896 – 13 April 1948	6 September 1940 – December 1940
Fehringer, Franz	14 June 1903 – ?	6 September 1940 – 13 January 1941
Bertha, Hans (DE)	14 April 1901 – 3 January 1964	30 September 1940 – March 1941
Jekelius, Erwin (DE)	5 June 1905 – 8 May 1952	14 October 1940 – February 1941
Müller, Robert	14 January 1886 – 2 June 1945	From 4 March 1941
Werner Villinger	9 October 1887 – 8 August 1961	From 28 March 1941
Straub, Erich (DE)	26 August 1885 – 29 April 1945	From 8 July 1941
Wischer, Gerhard (DE)	1 February 1903 – 4 November 1950	From 2 August 1941
Schmalenbach, Curt (DE)	24 February 1910 – 15 June 1944	From 28 August 1941
Ratka, Victor (DE)	27 December 1895 – 5 April 1966	From 10 September 1941
Runckel, Curd	4 August 1913 – ?	from 3 October 1942
Schulz, Alfred	13 September 1890 – 1947	From 7 May 1943
Schneider, Gustav	15 April 1908 – ?	From 31 May 1943 (?)

Copies of the reporting forms were dispatched to three or four of the above experts. The results were sent to the T4-Zentraldienststelle and presented to one of the three Obergutachter (top experts), who had the final word.

== List of Action T4 top experts ==
Person	Lifespan	Period as expert
Werner Heyde	25 April 1902 – 13 February 1964	October 1939 – December 1941
Hermann Paul Nitsche	25 November 1876 – 25 March 1948	From 28 February 1940
Herbert Linden (DE)	14 September 1899 – 27 April 1945	From October 1939

== List of experts for child euthanasia ==
There were also three medical experts for the "euthanasia" of children, starting a little before the Action T4 for adults:

Person	Lifespan	Period as expert
Werner Catel	27 June 1894 – 30 April 1961	From autumn 1939
Hans Heinze	18 October 1895 – 2 February 1983	From autumn 1939
Ernst Wentzler (DE)	3 September 1891 – 9 August 1973	From autumn 1939

== Bibliography ==
- Ernst Klee: "Euthanasie" im NS-Staat. Die "Vernichtung lebensunwerten Lebens"; Frankfurt am Main: S. Fischer Verlag, 1983; ISBN 3-10-039303-1
- Götz Aly (Hg.): Aktion T4 1939-1945. Die "Euthanasie"-Zentrale in der Tiergartenstraße 4; Berlin: Edition Hentrich, 1989, ISBN 3-926175-66-4
