= Dasein ohne Leben =

1942 Nazi propaganda film

Dasein ohne Leben – Psychiatrie und Menschlichkeit (Existence Without Life – Psychiatry and Humanity) is a 1942 Nazi propaganda film about the physically and mentally disabled. The film labeled inherited mental illness as a threat to public health and society, and called for extermination of those affected.

The film was not released to the public, (Note: The action was officially ended in 1941 (Hitler order on 1941-08-24) due to strong protests by clergymen (e.g. Joannes Baptista Sproll, Conrad Gröber and Clemens August von Galen and segments of the population, especially in the surroundings of the murder locations, but continued unofficially until at least 1944).) but was shown to perpetrators of the euthanasia program and to other leading figures. (Note: psychiatrists, expert witnesses, Max de Crinis (University of Cologne, Charité), Werner Heyde (University Würzburg), Hans Heinze (University of Berlin), Paul Nitsche (director psychiatric hospital Pirna-Sonnenstein, Carl Schneider (psychiatrist, Bethel Institution), Otto Wuth (Head of military psychiatry), Herbert Linden (Permanent Secretary, Interior ministry), Hellmuth Unger (writer)) All known copies of the film were thought to be lost, but after the politico-economic turnaround in the former GDR following reunification, eight reels of "the 23 rolls Schweninger shot for these films, complete with soundtracks" were found in 1989-1990 in Potsdam.

== Plot ==
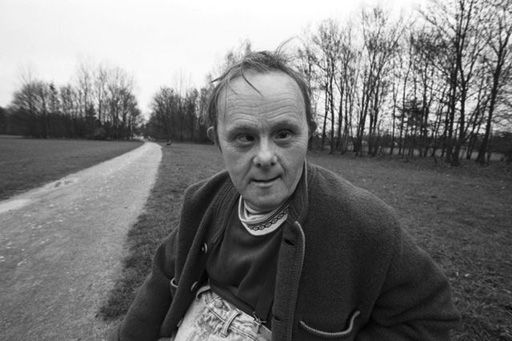
Walter, 53, with Down syndrome was hidden by his parents and managed to survive the Nazi period

The theme of the film is the call for the killing of mentally ill patients: "Inherited mental illness" is the "greatest public health hazard." Whoever is "afflicted" bears "the heavy burden of fate: an existence without life".

Embedded in the plot is a brief history of psychiatry. A professor (Note: In Germany this title means exclusively Full professor, which is important, as at that time, much more than today, the professor was an authority for most people.) named "Kämpfer" (English: "fighter") tells two students about the successes achieved in the treatment of mentally ill patients via electro-shock and insulin shock therapy. Shortly before the turn of the 20th century, many new institutions were established in order to accommodate an ever-increasing number of patients. In the setting of the film, there are 1,000 institutions with about 500,000 patients, which have to be cared for by 2,000 physicians and 40,000 nurses. The patients are accommodated in historic buildings in beautiful landscape, none of which is appreciated by the patients.

The second line of argumentation is the suggestive presentation of sick individuals via voice-over. A group of "idiots" in Hartheim Euthanasia Centre is described as follows: "We see here their future destiny, as if reflected in a funhouse mirror". A group of "idiots" in Kindberg, also a euthanasia centre, are "crippled in body and soul, miserable wretches, a burden to both themselves and to others, like ghosts without a will, imagination, or feeling." Further examples from other institutions follow, including Grafeneck Euthanasia Centre. The director of a "large lunatic asylum" appears as an expert: 73% of the parents of his "incurable inmates" were allegedly in favor of "redeeming" them.

== Filmmaking ==
The director was Hermann Schwenninger, one of the three managing directors of Gemeinnützige Krankentransport ("Charitable Ambulance"), a front company of Aktion T4, the central institution for the mass murder of patients in the Third Reich. Schwenninger also wrote parts of the screenplay of Ich klage an. The contract for the film came from Hitler's Chancellery, and was produced by Tobis Film.

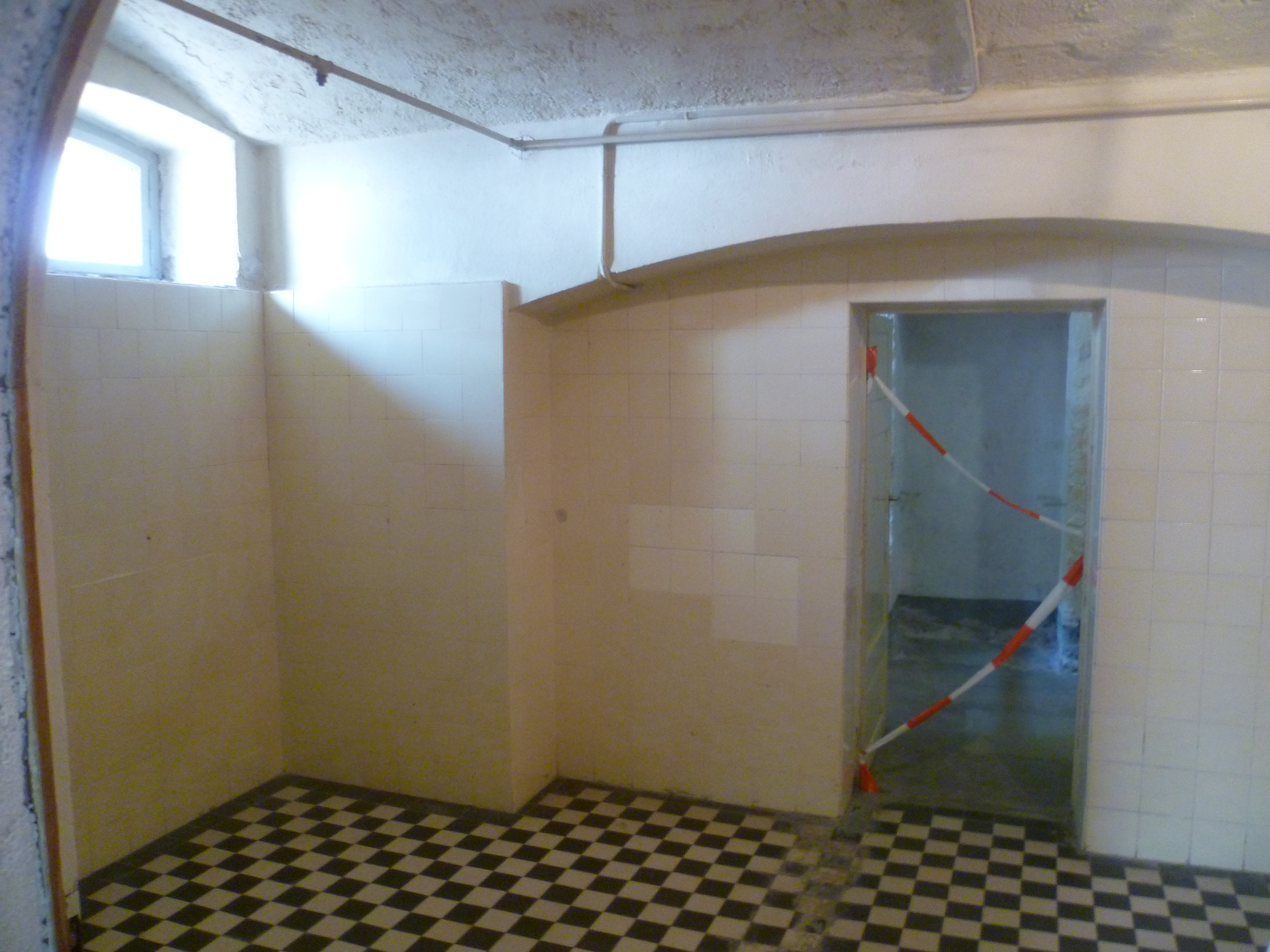
Gas chamber in Hadamar

For the filmmaking, Schwenninger shot the complete course of the NS euthanasia program, including the transport of the frightened patients to the killing institutions, and through an observation window the murder in a gas chamber of the center Pirna-Sonnenstein. During the one and a half year of production, the film team visited 20 to 30 institutions throughout Nazi Germany. (Note: The murders were performed in Grafeneck, Brandenburg an der Havel (Altes Zuchthaus), Bernburg, Hadamar, Hartheim, Pirna-Sonnenstein in Germany an in Chelmno in Poland. Kerstin Deppe, Jochen Kling (21 November 2017). "Die sechs Mordstätten der "T4"-Aktion" (in German)."Akcja T4 w Chełmie". YouTube (in Polish).)

== Film screening ==
The film only screened in closed circles.

In March 1942, the film was premiered in front of 28 physicians. The largest group were the reviewers (Note: The decision «death or life» was based only on written diagnostic reports) of Aktion T4 and members of the Reichsarbeitsgemeinschaft (Note: on behalf of the Aktion T4) (Max de Crinis, Hans Heinze, Werner Heyde, Paul Nitsche and Carl Schneider). They were joined by Herbert Linden (Reichsinnenministerium), Otto Wuth (psychiatrist of the army health system), three top politicians of the health care administration of Baden, Bavaria and Württemberg and Hellmuth Unger, a writer.

On 22 December 1942 the film was shown at the Military Medical Academy. (Note: Successor of the Kaiser-Wilhelms-Akademie, founded 1934, located in Invalidenstraße, Berlin) The invited audience consisted of the top officials of the Sicherheitspolizei, the Gestapo, the RKPA, Federal Ministry of the Interior, the Hitler Youth, the doctors of the military service, the head of the medical services of the Luftwaffe, eight doctors of the military academy, and the director of the Berlin Health Office.

In January 1943, Arthur Nebe (Note: Head of german criminal police, also SS general) screened Existence Without Life to hundreds of SS officers, who received it enthusiastically.

== Copies ==
Copies of the complete film as released are lost today, although there were at least six copies circulating among Nazi organizations, the SS, and the Wehrmacht staffs. It was assumed that the copies were destroyed before the Allies invaded but eight reels of the film were found in a GDR film archive. The eight reels, five to ten minutes each, are viewable online at the United States Holocaust Memorial Museum website. Some pre-production parts can be found in the Steven Spielberg Film and Video Archive.

A reconstruction of the film was made in the Channel Four documentary, Selling Murder: The Secret Propaganda Films of the Third Reich (1991) using the original script contained within the Federal German Archives and original footage of the mentally disabled but with actors for the roles of students and the professor.

== See also ==
- Nazism and cinema
- Propaganda in Nazi Germany

== Literature ==
- Karl Heinz Roth (1985). "Filmpropaganda für die Vernichtung der Geisteskranken und Behinderten im Dritten Reich". Reform und Gewissen. Euthanasie im Dienst des Fortschritts (in German). Berlin: Rotbuch-Verlag. pp. 125–196, 172–179. ISBN 978-3-940529-72-5.
- Karl Heinz Roth (1986). Filmpropaganda für die Vernichtung der Geisteskranken und Behinderten im Dritten Reich (in German). Hamburg: Hamburg Univ., Diss.
