= Arthur Dietzsch =

German concentration camp survivor (1901–1974)

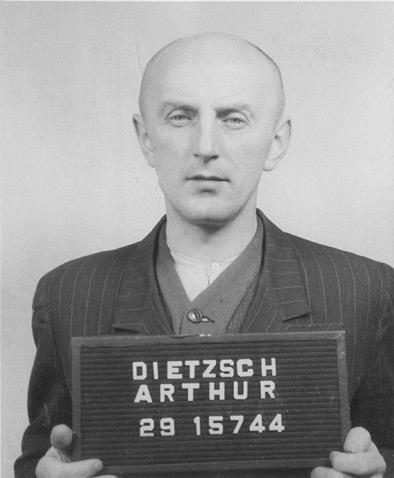
- Born: 2 October 1901; Pausa, Kingdom of Saxony
- Died: 26 August 1974 (aged 72); Burgdorf, Hanover Region, West Germany
- Spouse: Lilly Dietzsch
- Military career
- Allegiance: Weimar Republic
- Branch: Reichswehr
- Criminal information
- Conviction: War crimes
- Penalty: 15 years; overturned in 1950

Arthur Dietzsch (2 October 1901–26 August 1974) was a German former soldier, political prisoner and concentration camp survivor. From 1942–1945, Dietzsch was a kapo (German: Funktionshäftling) and inmate nurse (German: Häftlingspfleger) during the typhus experiments of Erwin Ding-Schuler at Buchenwald concentration camp.

In August 1947, Dietzsch was convinced at the Buchenwald trial and sentenced to 15 years imprisonment. Dietzsch's sentence was overturned in December 1950, after which he attempted to be recognised as a political prisoner.

== Early life ==
Arthur Dietzsch was born on 2 October 1901 in Pausa, Kingdom of Saxony (present-day, Pausa-Mühltroff, Germany).

Dietzsch attended Realgymnasium in Plauen and volunteered for war service at the very end of the Great War. After the armistice at the end of the First World War, he joined the veterans' organisation “Der Stahlhelm” and joined the very reduced post of Versailles German Army such as the Reichswehr on a 12-year contract. As a rifleman, he took part in street fights against communist rebels. Diligent and reliable, he was selected for Officers’ Training in 1920. As an Officer cadet, shortly before his promotion to lieutenant, he warned the father of his girlfriend about being on a wanted list for the latter's membership in the Communist Party, thus helping him to flee. Dietzsch's action was deemed a betrayal. In 1924, he was arrested for treason. In 1925, he was found guilty and sentenced to 14 years in prison.

== Inmate in concentration camps ==
After Hitler came to power, Dietzsch, still serving his 14 year sentence, was labelled a communist and transferred to KZ Sonnenburg in March 1933, from there to KZ Esterwegen in 1934 and later to KZ Lichtenburg. From February 1938 on, he was an inmate in KZ Buchenwald.

In January 1942, after almost 20 years as a prisoner, Dietzsch was made a trustee and inmate nurse in the newly founded "KZ Buchenwald Experimentierstation", a quarantine station in Block 46 for medical experiments with the highly infective epidemic typhus. There, he worked as a clerk and received on the job nurse training under SS doctors (KZ Lagerärzte) Erwin Ding-Schuler and the latter's temporary deputy Waldemar Hoven. Dietzsch was responsible for the care for spotted fever patients, experimentally infected as well as natural causes. Besides working for his SS masters, he worked closely with the inmates' underground board, the illegal Lagerleitung, better known as Buchenwald Resistance constantly risking his life by hiding prisoners sentenced to death by the SS in his quarantine station.

He worked as head inmate nurse and trustee in Block 46 until the beginning of April 1945. When his SS superior, Erwin Ding-Schuler, with whom Dietzsch had built more than a working relationship, tipped him off about being on a list of 46 inmates to be executed before the SS left the camp, he went into hiding, first in the foundation of a building, later by having himself dug into the ground and covered with loose dirt and leaves by two inmate friends. Dietzsch was liberated with the rest of KZ Buchenwald on 11 April 1945.

== After the War ==
A free man for the first time in 22 years, Dietzsch was arrested by the German authorities in December 1946 and had to serve as a witness for the defense in the Doctors' Trial (Nürnberger Ärzteprozess), the trials against SS doctors, among others KZ Buchenwald's Gerhard Rose and Waldemar Hoven. Arrested again by the US Military, he, together with 30 others found himself defendant in the Buchenwald Trial (Buchenwald-Hauptprozess) as an accessory to infecting Allied Prisoners of War with typhoid fever and spotted fever. Several witnesses gave statements for his defense, among them two British Officers and the future diplomat and philosopher Stéphane Hessel, all three of whom had been on death row under the Nazis; Dietzsch had saved their lives by giving them identities of dead prisoners and hiding them in the quarantine station. Still, Dietzsch was sentenced to 15 years in prison for accessory to murder and began to serve his time in Landsberg Prison, a prison for German war criminals. He was in fact incarcerated with people who were responsible for holding him in KZ for more than a decade of his life. After a media campaign of former Buchenwald inmates Werner Hilpert and Eugen Kogon, who made his connections with the KZ underground known as well as lobbying by journalists and resistance members Marion Gräfin Dönhoff and Kurt Schumacher, Dietzsch was released from prison in 1950. He was still treated like a Nazi and only with the help of Hilpert and Kogon was he able to pass Allied denazification, such as Entnazifizierung in 1951.

Germany never recognized him as a political prisoner, he never received compensation for his years in concentration camps. The fact that he saved lives risking his own, was never officially recognized. In addition, he was refused work on base of his dishonourable discharge for treason and subsequent criminal record. With his health failing due to the long and harsh years in concentration camps, he only survived thanks to the support given by thankful former Buchenwald inmates. Having found belated happiness with his wife Lilly, née Endryat, he spent the remainder of his life corresponding with former KZ inmates and organizations of former political prisoners and members of the resistance. He later testified in several trials connected to KZ Buchenwald.

His life story was literarily processed by Ernst von Salomon in Das Schicksal des A. D. – Ein Mann im Schatten der Geschichte and published in 1960. A preprint appeared in the weekly newspaper Die Zeit from 1959.

Dietzsch died in August 1974 in Burgdorf, Germany.

== Literature and sources ==
- Ernst von Salomon: Das Schicksal des A.D. – Ein Mann im Schatten der Geschichte ; Hamburg: Rowohlt Verlag, 1960
- Buchenwald-Hauptprozess: Deputy Judge Advocate's Office 7708 War Crimes Group European Command APO 407: (United States of America v. Josias Prince zu Waldeck et al. – Case 000-50-9), November 1947 Originaldokument in englischer Sprache (PDF-Datei; 9,1 MB)
- Institut für Zeitgeschichte München – Berlin: Nachlaß Arthur Dietzsch (1901–1974). Archiv, Bestand ED 112 Band 1–18 (pdf; 1,3 MB)
