= Ernst Rüdin =

Swiss-German geneticist (1874–1952)

- Rüdin in 1944
- Born: 19 April 1874; St. Gallen, Switzerland
- Died: 22 October 1952 (aged 78); Munich, West Germany
- Education: Burghölzli (prison), Zürich
- Known for: Genetics of schizophrenia; support for mass sterilization and clinical killing of adults and children
- Political party: Nazi Party (1937–1945)
- Awards: Goethe medal for art and science; Nazi eagle medal (Adlerschild des Deutschen Reiches),
- Scientific career
- Fields: Psychiatry, genetics, eugenics
- Workplaces: Moabit (prison), Berlin; Ludwig-Maximilians-Universität München; University of Basel
- Patrons: Wilhelm Frick
- Thesis: Über die klinischen Formen der Gefängnisspsychosen (On the clinical forms of prison psychosis)
- Doctoral advisor: Eugen Bleuler
- Other academic advisors: Emil Kraepelin

Ernst Rüdin (19 April 1874 – 22 October 1952) was a Swiss psychiatrist, geneticist, eugenicist and Nazi, rising to prominence under Emil Kraepelin and assuming the directorship at the German Institute for Psychiatric Research in Munich. While he has been credited as a pioneer of psychiatric inheritance studies, he also argued for, designed, justified and funded the mass sterilization and clinical killing of adults and children.

== Early career ==
Rüdin was born on 19 April 1874 in St. Gallen, Switzerland, the son of Conrad Rüdin, a textile salesman. From 1893 until graduating in 1898, he studied medicine in Geneva, Lausanne, Naples, Heidelberg, Berlin, Dublin and Zürich. In 1899, at the Burghölzli in Zürich, Rüdin worked as an assistant to psychiatrist Eugen Bleuler, who coined the term schizophrenia. He completed his PhD, then a psychiatric residency at a prison in Moabit, Berlin.

From 1907, Rüdin worked at the Ludwig-Maximilians-Universität München as an assistant to Emil Kraepelin, the highly influential psychiatrist who had developed the diagnostic split between 'dementia praecox' ('early dementia' – reflecting his pessimistic prognosis – renamed schizophrenia) and 'manic-depressive illness' (including unipolar depression), and who is considered by many to be the father of modern psychiatric classification. He became senior lecturer in 1909, as well as senior physician at the Munich Psychiatric Hospital, succeeding Alois Alzheimer.

Kraepelin and Rüdin were both ardent advocates of a theory that the German race was becoming overly 'domesticated' and thus degenerating into higher rates of mental illness and other conditions. Fears of degeneration were somewhat common internationally at the time, but the lengths to which Rüdin took them may have been unique, and from the very beginning of his career he made continuous efforts to have his research translate into political action. He also repeatedly drew attention to the financial burden of sick and disabled people.

Rüdin developed the concept of "empirical genetic prognosis" of mental disorders. He published influential initial results on the genetics of schizophrenia (known as dementia praecox) in 1916. Rüdin's data did not show a high enough risk in siblings for schizophrenia to be due to a simple recessive gene as he and Kraepelin thought, but he put forward a two-recessive-gene theory to try to account for this. This has been attributed to a "mistaken belief" that just one or a small number of gene variations caused such conditions.

Similarly his own large study on mood disorders correctly disproved his own theory of simple Mendelian inheritance and also showed environmental causes, but Rüdin simply neglected to publish his data while continuing to advance his eugenic theories. Nevertheless, Rüdin pioneered and refined complex techniques for conducting studies of inheritance, was widely cited in the international literature for decades, and is still regarded as "the father of psychiatric genetics".

Rüdin was influenced by his then brother-in-law, and long-time friend and colleague, Alfred Ploetz, who was considered the 'father' of racial hygiene and indeed had coined the term in 1895. This was a form of eugenics, inspired by social darwinism, which had gained some popularity internationally, as would the voluntary or compulsory sterilization of psychiatric patients, initially in America.

Rüdin campaigned for this early on. At a conference on alcoholism in 1903, he argued for the sterilisation of 'incurable alcoholics', but his proposal was roundly defeated. In 1904, he was appointed co-editor in chief of the newly founded Archive for Racial Hygiene and Social Biology, and in 1905 was among the co-founders of the German Society for Racial Hygiene (which soon became International), along with Ploetz. He published an article of his own in Archives in 1910, in which he argued that medical care for the mentally ill, alcoholics, epileptics and others was a distortion of natural laws of natural selection, and medicine should help to clean the genetic pool.

== Increasing influence ==
In 1917, a new German Institute for Psychiatric Research was established in Munich (known as the DFA in German; renamed the Max Planck Institute of Psychiatry after World War II), designed and driven forward by Emil Kraepelin. The Institute incorporated a Department of Genealogical and Demographic Studies (known as the GDA in German) – the first in the world specialising in psychiatric genetics – and Rüdin was put in charge by overall director Kraepelin. In 1924, the Institute came under the umbrella of the prestigious Kaiser Wilhelm Society.

Rüdin returned to Switzerland in 1925, where he spent three years as full Professor of Psychology and director of the psychiatric clinic of the University of Basel. He returned to the Institute in 1928, with an expanded departmental budget and new building at 2 Kraepelinstrasse, financed primarily by the American Rockefeller Foundation. The institute soon gained an international reputation as leading psychiatric research center, including in hereditary genetics. In 1931, a few years after Kraepelin's death, Rüdin took over the directorship of the entire Institute as well as remaining head of his department.

Rüdin was among the first to write about the "dangers" of hereditary defectives and the supposed value of the Nordic race as "culture creators". By 1920, his colleague Alfred Hoche published, with lawyer Karl Binding, the influential "Allowing the Destruction of Life Unworthy of Living".

In 1930, Rüdin was a leading German representative at the First International Congress for Mental Hygiene, held in Washington, US, arguing for eugenics. In 1932, he became President of the International Federation of Eugenics Organizations. He was in contact with Carlos Blacker of the British Eugenics Society, and sent him a copy of pre-Nazi voluntary sterilization laws enacted in Prussia; a precursor to the Nazi forced sterilization laws that Rüdin is said to have already prepared in his desk drawer.

From 1935 to 1945, he was President of the Society of German Neurologists and Psychiatrists (GDNP), later renamed the German Association for Psychiatry, Psychotherapy and Neurology (DGPPN).

The American Rockefeller Foundation funded numerous international researchers to visit and work at Rüdin's psychiatric genetics department, even as late as 1939. These included Eliot Slater and Erik Stromgren, considered the founding fathers of psychiatric genetics in Britain and Scandinavia respectively, as well as Franz Josef Kallmann, who became a leading figure in twins research in the US after emigrating in 1936. Kallmann had claimed in 1935 that 'minor anomalies' in otherwise unaffected relatives of schizophrenic people should be grounds for compulsory sterilization.

Rüdin's research was also supported with manpower and financing from the German National Socialists.

== Nazi expert ==
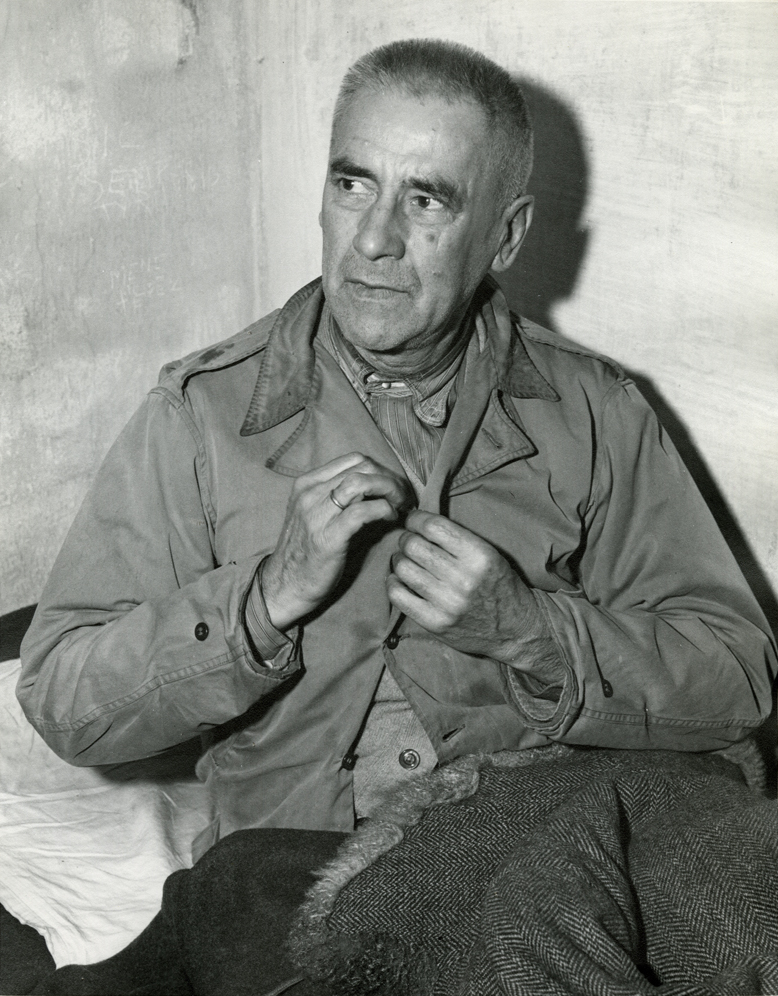
Wilhelm Frick in his cell at Nuremberg, November 1945

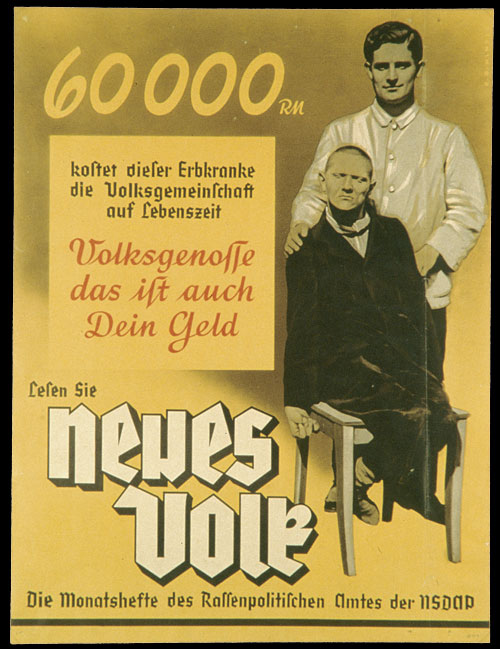
This poster (from around 1938) reads: "60,000 ℛ︁ℳ︁ is what this person suffering from a hereditary defect costs the People's community during his lifetime. Fellow citizen, that is your money too. Read '[A] New People', the monthly magazine of the Bureau for Race Politics of the NSDAP."

In 1933, Ernst Rüdin, Alfred Ploetz, and several other experts on racial hygiene were brought together to form the Expert Committee on Questions of Population and Racial Policy under Reich Interior Minister Wilhelm Frick. The committee's ideas were used as a scientific basis to justify the racial policy of Nazi Germany and its "Law for the Prevention of Hereditarily Diseased Offspring" was passed by the German government on 1 January 1934. Rüdin was such an avid proponent that colleagues nicknamed him the "Reichsfuhrer for Sterilization"

In a speech to the German Society for Rassenhygiene published in 1934, Rüdin recalled the early days of trying to alert the public to the special value of the Nordic race and the dangers of defectives. He stated: "The significance of racial hygiene did not become evident to all aware Germans until the political activity of Adolf Hitler and only through his work has our 30-year-long dream of translating racial hygiene into action finally become a reality." Describing it as a 'duty of honour' for society to help implement the Nazi policies, Rüdin declared: "Whoever is not physically or mentally fit must not pass on his defects to his children. The state must take care that only the fit produce children. Conversely, it must be regarded as reprehensible to withhold healthy children from the state."

From early on, Rüdin had been a 'racial fanatic' for the purity of the 'German people'. However, he was also described in 1988 as "not so much a fanatical Nazi as a fanatical geneticist". His ideas for reducing new cases of schizophrenia would prove a total failure, despite between 73% and 100% of the diagnosed being sterilised or killed.

Rüdin joined the Nazi Party in 1937. In 1939, on his 65th birthday, he was awarded a 'Goethe medal for art and science' handed to him personally by Hitler, who honoured him as the 'pioneer of the racial-hygienic measures of the Third Reich'. In 1944, he received a bronze Nazi eagle medal (Adlerschild des Deutschen Reiches), with Hitler calling him the 'pathfinder in the field of hereditary hygiene'.

In 1942, speaking about 'euthanasia', Rüdin emphasised "the value of eliminating young children of clearly inferior quality". He supported and financially aided the work of Julius Duessen at Heidelberg University with Carl Schneider, clinical research which from the beginning involved killing children.

== Post-war life ==
At the end of the war in 1945, Rüdin claimed he had only ever engaged in academic science, only ever heard rumours of killings at the nearby insane asylums, and that he hated the Nazis. However, some of his Nazi political activities, scientific justifications, and awards from Hitler were already uncovered in 1945 (as were his lecture handouts praising Nordics and disparaging Jews). Investigative journalist Victor H. Bernstein concluded: "I am sure that Prof. Rüdin never so much as killed a fly in his 74 years. I am also sure he is one of the most evil men in Germany."

In 1945, Rüdin was stripped of his Swiss citizenship, which he had held jointly with German since 1912, and two months later was placed under house arrest by the Munich Military Government. However, interned in the US, he was released in 1947 after a 'denazification' trial where he was supported by former colleague Kallmann (a eugenicist himself) and famous quantum physicist Max Planck; his only punishment was a 500 ℛ︁ℳ︁ fine.

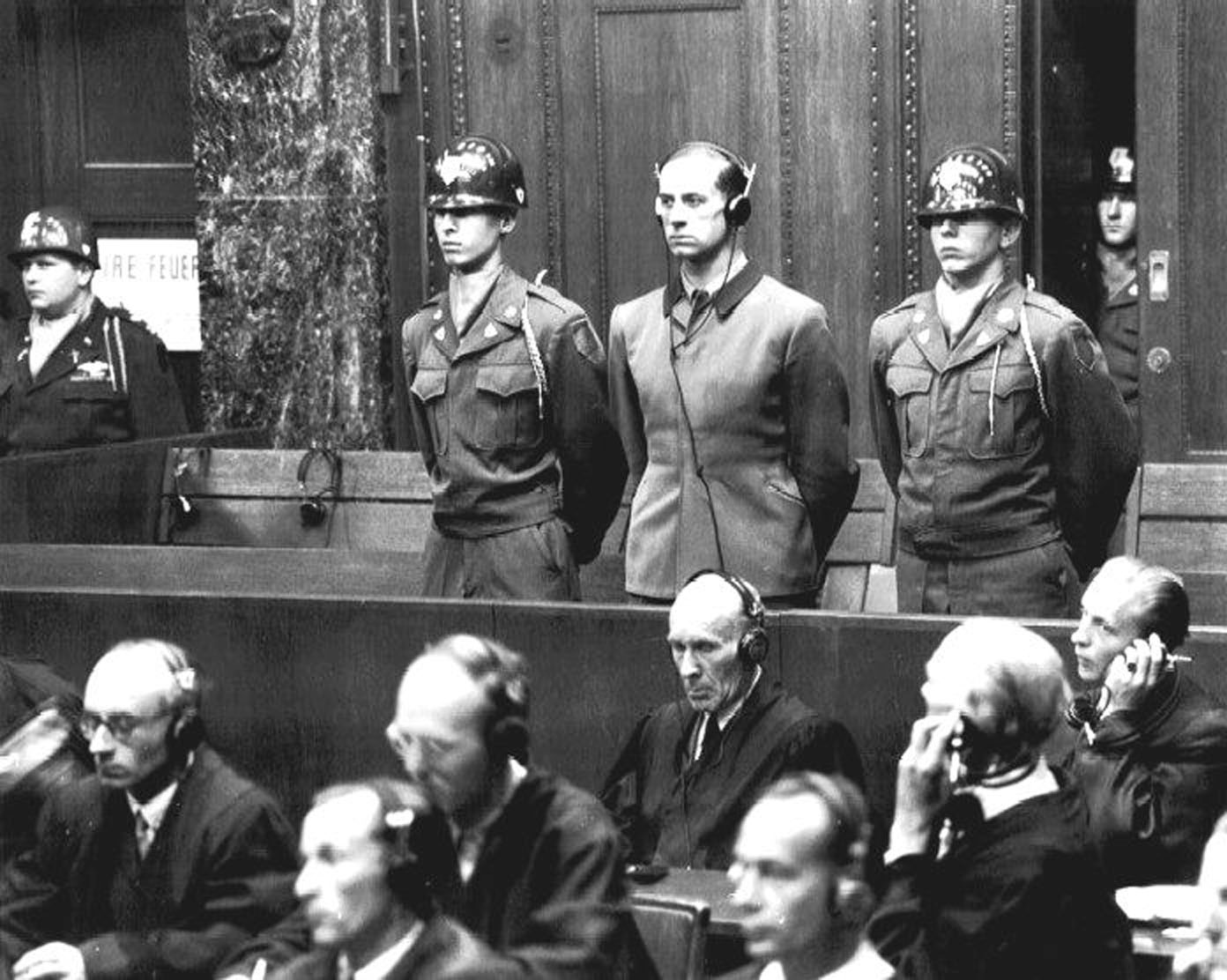
Karl Brandt on trial, 20 August 1947

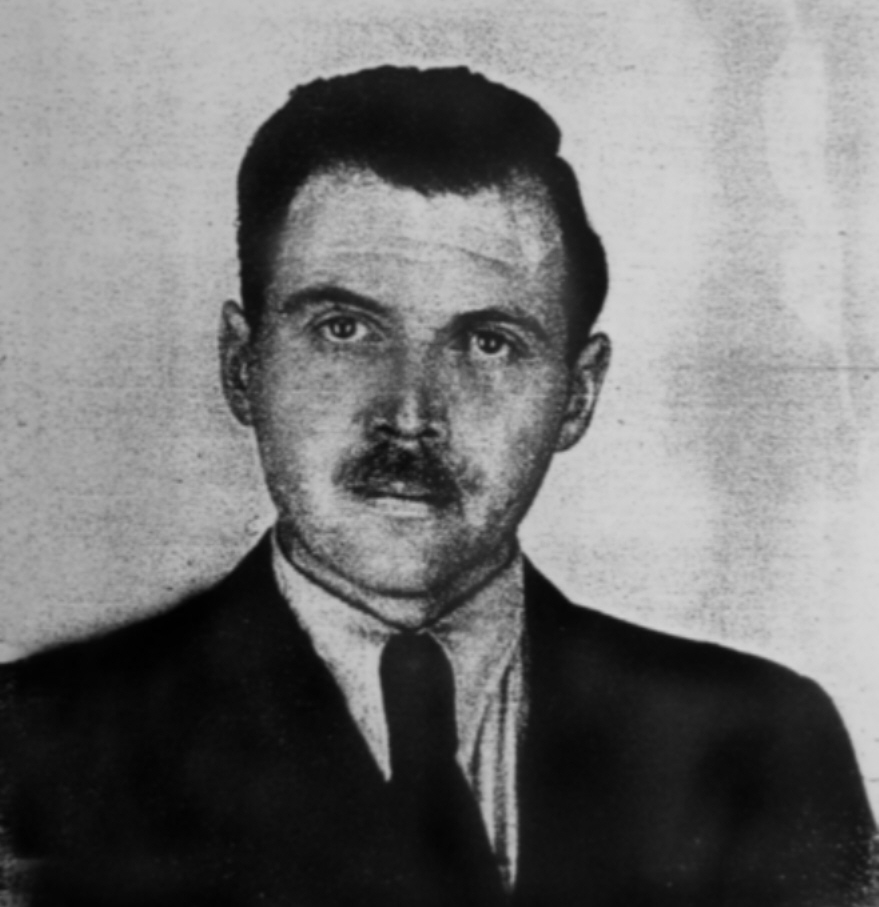
Photo from Josef Mengele's Argentine identification document (1956)

Speculation about the reasons for his early release, despite having been considered as a potential criminal defendant for the Nuremberg trials, include the need to restore confidence and order in the German medical profession; his personal and financial connections to prestigious American and British researchers, funding bodies and others; and the fact that he repeatedly cited American eugenic sterilization initiatives to justify his own as legal (indeed the Nuremberg trials carefully avoided highlighting such links in general). Nevertheless, Rüdin has been cited as a more senior and influential architect of Nazi crimes than the physician who was sentenced to death, Karl Brandt, or the infamous Josef Mengele, who had attended his lectures and been employed by his Institute.

After Rüdin's death in 1952, the funeral eulogy was delivered by Kurt Pohlisch, a close friend who had been professor of psychiatry at Bonn University, director of the second-largest genetics research institute in Germany, and expert Nazi advisor on Action T4.

Rüdin's connections to the Nazis were a major reason for criticisms of psychiatric genetics in Germany after 1945.

He was survived by his daughter, Edith Zerbin-Rüdin, who became a psychiatric geneticist and eugenicist herself. In 1996, Zerbin-Rüdin, along with Kenneth S. Kendler, published a series of articles on his work which were criticised by others for whitewashing his racist and later Nazi ideologies and activities (Elliot S. Gershon also notes that Zerbin-Rüdin acted as defender and apologist for her father in private conversation and in a transcribed interview published in 1988). Kendler and other leading psychiatric genetic authors have been accused as recently as 2013 of producing revisionist historical accounts of Rüdin and his 'Munich School'. Three types of account have been identified: "(A) those who write about German psychiatric genetics in the Nazi period, but either fail to mention Rüdin at all, or cast him in a favorable light; (B) those who acknowledge that Rüdin helped promote eugenic sterilization and/or may have worked with the Nazis, but generally paint a positive picture of Rüdin's research and fail to mention his participation in the "euthanasia" killing program; and (C) those who have written that Rüdin committed and supported unspeakable atrocities."

== Partial bibliography ==
- Über die klinischen Formen der Gefängnisspsychosen, Diss. Zürich, 1901
- (Hrsg.) Studien über Vererbung und Entstehung geistiger Störungen, 1916–1939
- Psychiatrische Indikation zur Sterilisierung, 1929
- (Einl.) Gesetz zur Verhütung erbkranken Nachwuchses vom 14. Juli 1933, 1934
- (Hrsg.) Erblehre und Rassenhygiene im völkischen Staat, 1934
- Die Bedeutung der Eugenik und Genetik für die Psychische Hygiene. Zeitschrift für psychische Hygiene 3 (1930), pp. 133–147

== See also ==
- T-4 Euthanasia Program
- Ethnic cleansing
- Eugenics
- Nazi doctors (list)
- Racial hygiene
- Werner Heyde
- Werner Villinger
- Alfred Ploetz
