= Expert Committee on Questions of Population and Racial Policy =

The Expert Committee on Questions of Population and Racial Policy (German: Sachverständigen-Beirat für Bevölkerungsfragen und Rassenpolitik) was a Nazi Germany committee formed on 2 June 1933 that planned Nazi racial policy. On July 14, 1933, the committee's recommendations were made law as the Law for the Prevention of Genetically Diseased Offspring, or the "Sterilization Law".

The committee was organized by Interior Minister Wilhelm Frick, and brought together many important Nazi figures on racial theory, including Ernst Rudin, Alfred Ploetz, Arthur Gutt, Heinrich Himmler, Fritz Thyssen, Fritz Lenz, Friedrich Burgdorfer, Walther Darre, Hans F. K. Günther, Charlotte von Hadeln, Bodo Spiethoff, Paul Schultze-Naumburg, Gerhard Wagner, and Baldur von Schirach.

== Preceding Weimar Republic committee ==
The Nazi's expert committee replaced the old Reichsausschuss fur Bevolkerungsfragen, established by Frick's predecessor, Carl Severing. Only one member of the new committee—Friedrich Burgdorfer—was also on the old committee.

== Findings ==
At the first meeting, Frick gave a speech calling for a new German population policy. He argued the declining birthrate would weaken the quantity and quality of the race. Germany at that time had been facing an increasingly older population, and Jews were immigrating in large numbers. Frick argued this would lead to "degenerate" offspring. He also warned the number of "genetically diseased" were growing because of a lack of a government racial policy. He estimated—conservatively, in his opinion—the number of Germans with genetic defects to be at 500,000. "Some experts," he said, "consider the true figure to be as high as 20 percent of the German population."

== Sterilization law ==
Because of the findings of the committee, the Law for the Prevention of Genetically Diseased Offspring was passed.
