= Helmut Poppendick =

WW2 SS Doctor & war criminal

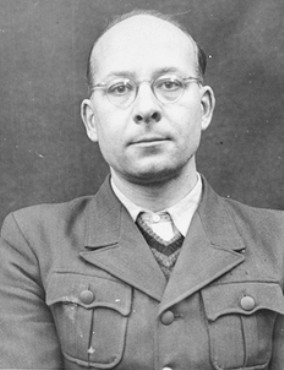
- Born: 6 January 1902; Hude, Grand Duchy of Oldenburg, German Empire
- Died: 11 January 1994 (aged 92); Oldenburg, Lower Saxony, Germany
- Occupation: Doctor
- Organization: Schutzstaffel
- Status: Deceased
- Conviction: Membership in a criminal organization
- Trial: Doctors' Trial
- Penalty: 10 years imprisonment; commuted to time served

Helmut Poppendick (6 January 1902 – 11 January 1994) was a Nazi physician in the SS during World War II. After the war he was a defendant in the 1947 Doctors' Trial and accused of war crimes relating to human experimentation; he was acquitted on these charges, but convicted for his SS membership and sentenced to 10 year imprisonment. He was released in 1951.

== Education and Nazi activities ==
Poppendick studied medicine from 1919 to 1926 in Göttingen, Munich, and Berlin. Poppendick received his medical license on 1 February 1928. Then, he worked for four years as a clinical assistant at the First Medical Clinic of Charité in Berlin. From June 1933 to October 1934 he was the assistant medical director at Virchow Hospital in Berlin.

He was an internist and worked in the Medical Doctorate, as Chief of the Personal Staff of the Reich Physician SS and Police.

In 1935, he completed training as an expert for "race hygiene" at the Kaiser Wilhelm Institute for Anthropology, Human Genetics and Eugenics. After this, he became the adjutant of the ministerial director Arthur Gütt at the Reich Ministry of the Interior. He was also the Chief of Staff at the SS Office for Population Politics and Genetic Health Care, which in 1937 became the SS Main Race and Settlement Office. Poppendick was departmental head and staff leader of the Genealogical Office.

At the beginning of World War II, he was drafted as an adjutant to a medical department of the army and took part in the attack on Belgium, France and the Netherlands. In November 1941, Poppendick was accepted into the Waffen-SS. In 1943, Ernst-Robert Grawitz of the Reich Physician SS appointed him to lead his personal staff. Poppendick joined the NSDAP in 1932 (party member No. 998607) and the SS (No. 36345). He reached the rank of Oberführer in the SS.

== War crimes, Doctors' Trial, and release ==
Poppendick was implicated in a series of medical experiments done on concentration camp prisoners, including the medical experiments done in Ravensbrück concentration camp. At the American Military Tribunal No. I on 20 August 1947, he was acquitted from being criminally implicated in medical experiments. However, the court ruled in several instances, there was substantial evidence that Poppendick was aware of illegal human experimentation taking place. Poppendick was sentenced to 10 years imprisonment for being a member of the SS, which had been deemed a criminal organization by the International Military Tribunal.

On 31 January 1951, Poppendick's sentence was commuted to time served, and he was released from prison the next day. Later on, Poppendick managed to get his medical services paid by insurance, in Oldenburg.

== See also ==
- Doctors' Trial
- Nazi human experimentation
