= Gerhard Rose =

Nazi German war criminal (1896–1992)

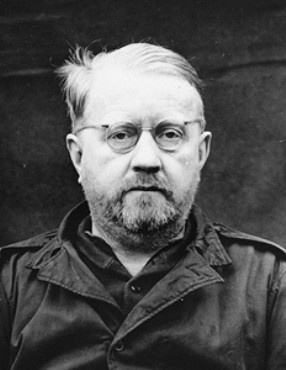
- Mugshot of Rose
- Born: 30 November 1896; Danzig, German Empire
- Died: 13 January 1992 (aged 95); Obernkirchen, Germany
- Occupation: Physician
- Political party: Nazi Party
- Convictions: War crimes Crimes against humanity
- Trial: Doctors' Trial
- Penalty: Life imprisonment, commuted to 15 years imprisonment

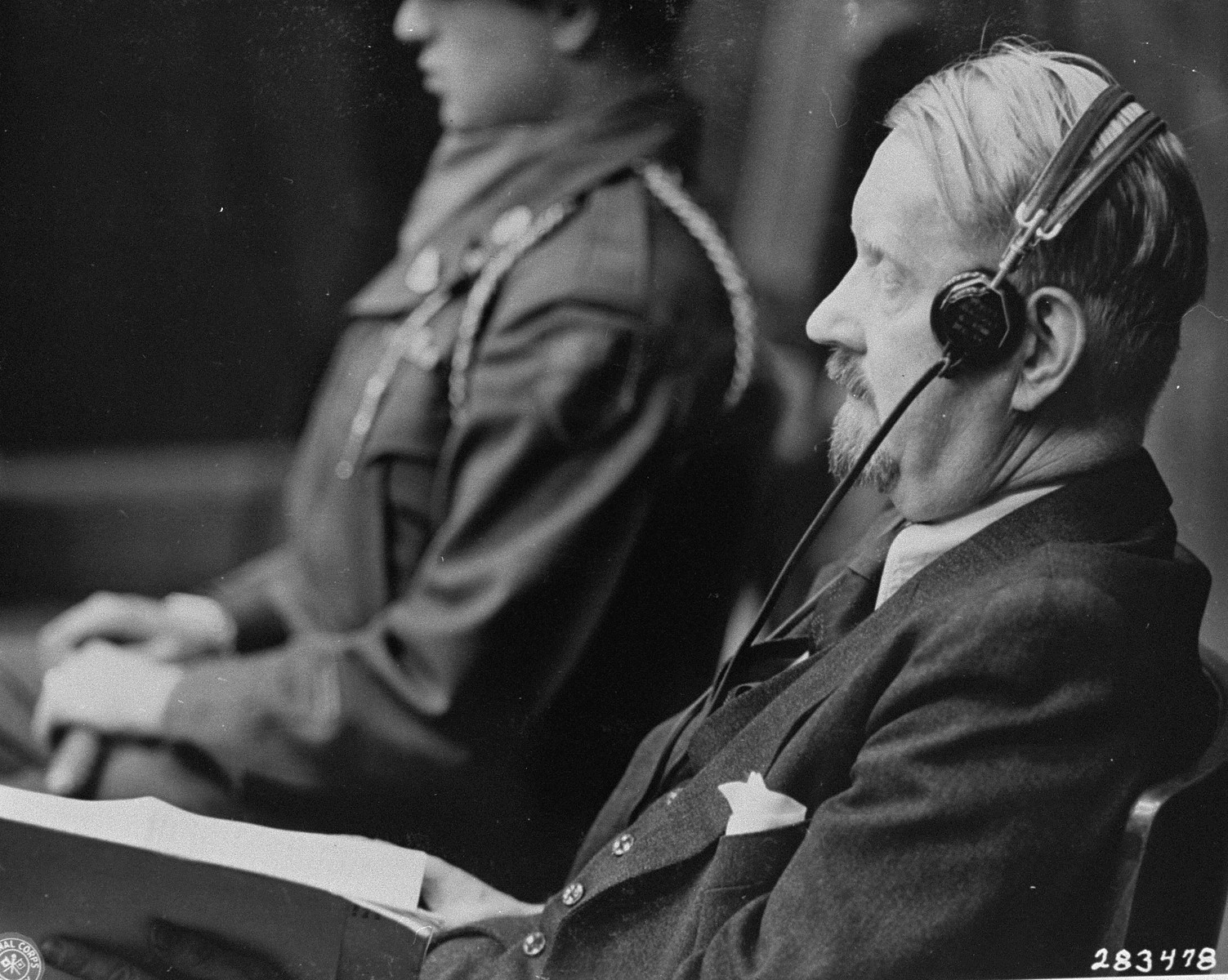
Gerhard Rose testifies in his own defense at the Doctors' Trial in Nuremberg in 1947

Gerhard August Heinrich Rose (30 November 1896 – 13 January 1992) was a Nazi German physician and war criminal who performed medical atrocities on concentration camp prisoners at Dachau and Buchenwald without the subjects' consent. He infected Jews, Romani people, and the mentally ill with malaria and typhus. Following the Doctors' Trial, Rose was convicted of war crimes and sentenced to life in prison, but he was released in 1955.

== Early life and education ==
Rose was born in Danzig (then part of West Prussia, Prussia, Germany, now Gdańsk, Poland). He attended high schools in Stettin, Düsseldorf, Bremen and Breslau. After graduation, Rose studied medicine at the Kaiser Wilhelm Academy for military medical education in Berlin. Rose's training was interrupted from 1914 to 1918 by the First World War. In 1914, he was active in the Pépinière Corps Saxonia. He moved to the Friedrich-Wilhelms-University Berlin and to the Silesian Friedrich-Wilhelm University of Breslau to continue his studies. Rose completed the state medical examination on 15 November 1921, receiving the mark "very good". He received his doctorate on 20 November 1922, graduating magna cum laude. He was formally approved to practice medicine on 16 May 1922. In 1923, he became a member of the Corps Franconia Hamburg. Between 1922 and 1926, Rose worked as a medical assistant at the Robert Koch Institute in Berlin, at the Hygienic Institute in Basel and at the Anatomical Institute of the University of Freiburg.

== China and Nazi Party membership ==
In 1929, Rose left Germany to work in China. He was a medical adviser to the Kuomintang government. In 1929, he was appointed director of the medical office in Chekiang. He was also the health adviser at the Ministry of the interior in Chekiang. He was unable to pursue his studies during his time in China.

In 1930, Rose joined the Nazi Party. His member number was 346.161.

== Return from China ==
Rose returned to Berlin in September 1936, prior to the Second Sino-Japanese War. He took over as head of the Department of Tropical Medicine at the Berlin Robert Koch Institute on 1 October 1936. Beginning in the 1938 summer semester, Rose held lectures and exercises on tropical hygiene and tropical medicine at Berlin University. On 1 February 1943, Rose was named vice president of the Robert Koch Institute.

In 1939, Rose entered the medical branch of the Luftwaffe. In 1942, he was appointed advisory hygienist on tropical medicine in the medical service of the Luftwaffe. When the war ended, Rose held the rank of a general physician.

== War crimes ==
=== Malaria experiments ===
Rose's predecessor as Head of Department at the Robert Koch Institute was Claus Schilling. Schilling had performed malaria experiments; Rose continued his experiments, mostly with psychiatric patients. In 1917, the Austrian psychiatrist Julius Wagner-Jauregg used malaria infection as a treatment for General paresis of the insane. Rose used the same treatment for schizophrenia.

Rose carried out his malaria experiments on the mentally ill at Dachau concentration camp, Buchenwald concentration camp, and with Russian prisoners in a psychiatric clinic in Thuringia.

Between 1941 and 1942, Rose tested new antimalarial drugs for IG Farben in Arnsdorf. The Arnsdorf sanatorium documented the malaria experiments which Rose performed. By July 1942, 110 patients had been infected by mosquito bites. In the first test series, which had 49 human subjects, four people died. The experiments in Arnsdorf coincided with the Aktion T4, the Nazi government's mass murder campaign against the disabled and mentally ill. Psychiatric patients in Arnsdorf were transferred to other institutions and killed there. According to the company, Rose sought out one of the main organizers of Aktion T4, Viktor Brack, and was promised that his subjects would not be transferred.

From January 1942 onward, Rose conducted human experiments in Dachau concentration camp to develop a vaccine against malaria.

=== Typhus vaccine trials in concentration camps ===
The isolation of the Jewish civilians in ghettoes and of foreign prisoners in the POW camps led to typhus outbreaks in the German-occupied East. As many typhus cases came out of Warsaw, the General Government said that the outbreak was "originating from the Jewish quarter of Warsaw [from] vagabond Jews." Rudolf Wohlrab met with Rose in Warsaw. In the autumn of 1941, the disease spread west as Wehrmacht soldiers returned to Germany on leave and as forced laborers were deported to Germany. In December 1941, a meeting was held to discuss the search for a suitable vaccine. Representatives of the Armed Forces, manufacturers, and representatives of the Reich Interior Ministry gathered to discuss a potential typhoid vaccine. Some manufacturers had designed new vaccines, but did not know if they were effective. Those gathered agreed to test potential vaccines on prisoners in Buchenwald. The experiments were under the control of Joachim Mrugowsky, who worked for the Hygiene Institute of the Waffen SS. In Buchenwald, Erwin Ding-Schuler led the experiments.

On 17 March 1942, Rose and Eugen Gildemeister went to the experimental station at Buchenwald. By that time, 150 prisoners had been infected with typhus, with 148 of them showing signs of disease.

At the 3rd session of the Consultative Medical Wehrmacht in May 1943, Ding-Schuler held a lecture entitled On the results of the examination of different spotted fever vaccines against the classical typhus , in which he discussed the results of human experiments. Rose, who was present at the conference and had been informed of the nature of the human experiments, voiced his objections about the nature of the human trials. According to the testimony of those who were present, Rose quietly whispered "that this could have been concentration camp experiments."

Rose's opposition was later confirmed by Eugen Kogon. Kogon was an inmate of Ding-Schuler, who repeatedly voiced his displeasure with Rose's interventions in Buchenwald.

Despite his protests in May 1943, Rose went to Joachim Mrugowsky on 2 December 1943 with a request. He asked to perform further tests of a new typhus vaccine at Buchenwald. Enno Lolling, head of Office D III (sanitation and camp hygiene) in the SS economic and administrative main Office, approved the series of experiments on 14 February 1944. He said that "30 suitable gypsies" should be transferred to Buchenwald. The tests were performed between March and June 1944. Six of the 26 prisoners infected with typhus died.

On 4 October 1943, Haagen wrote to Rose to complain that he lacked the appropriate prisoners to carry out infection experiments on vaccinated persons. On 13 November 1943, the SS office sent 100 prisoners to Haagen. In early 1944, the Institute of Hygiene of the Luftwaffe, led by Rose, settled into the Pfafferode sanatorium near Mühlhausen. In Pfafferode, led by Theodor Steinmeyer, patients were murdered by food deprivation and drug overdose as part of Aktion T4.

== Defendant in the Doctors' Trial ==
When the war ended on 8 May 1945, Rose was captured by Allied troops. Evidence from the Nuremberg trials suggested that doctors from the Luftwaffe had carried out human experiments in concentration camps. The subsequent Doctors' trial began as a result. Hermann Göring was also among the accused.

According to the medical historian Udo Benzenhöfer, investigations into lower-ranking people during the trials led the Allies to find higher-ranked defendants. Rose was just one of seven accused Luftwaffe doctors in Doctors' Trial.

Central to the case against Rose were the typhus experiments in Buchenwald and Natzweiler. During the process, Rose was also accused of having supported Claus Schilling's malaria experiments in Dachau.

Rose's intellectual nature and extensive medical experience made him stand out among the defendants. In his testimony between 18 and 25 April 1947, he made numerous comparisons between the tests in German concentration camps and experiments that foreign researchers had carried out on humans. He drew from his international experience to make these comparisons. He claimed to have believed that the experiments in the Buchenwald concentration camp were "carried out on criminals sentenced to death." This was contradicted by the testimony of former inmate Eugen Kogon. Kogon stated that it became impossible to find volunteers in Buchenwald after one or two trials. There was not a single case in which a death sentence was passed.

The prosecution put forward as evidence Rose's letter to Joachim Mrugowsky from 2 December 1943. Rose then compared himself to a lawyer who is an opponent of the death penalty but still recommends the death sentence for a criminal: "If he does not succeed, it will remain as still in the profession and in its surroundings there, and he can even be may be forced to utter such a death sentence even though he basically is an opponent of this institution."

== Prison and campaign for clemency ==
On 31 January 1951, Rose's life sentence was reduced to fifteen years in prison by the American High Commissioner John J. McCloy. On 3 June 1955, Rose was the last of the prisoners in the doctors' trial to be dismissed from Landsberg Prison.

Rose's detention was accompanied by various efforts for his early release by his wife and Ernst Georg Nauck, director of the Hamburger Bernhard Nocht Institute. On 29 September 1950, the Free Association of German Hygienists and Microbiologists contacted John J. McCloy with a request for Rose's release. They argued that, given his large professional experience and previous performance, "[Rose] will give science and humanity many valuable benefits when used [...], after more five and a half years [in] prison." In the weekly Hamburg newspaper Die Zeit, an article was published with the heading Zu Unrecht in Landsberg. Ein Wort für den Forscher und Arzt Gerhard Rose. ("Wrongly in Landsberg. A word for the doctor and researcher Gerhard Rose.") The article was written by Josef Müller-Marein.

A clemency petition from 2 November 1953 demanded Rose's freedom. Those who wrote the petition argued that the men who had the highest authority over the typhus experiments had not been held accountable; in fact, they were being transferred to the US government service.

== Later life ==
During an interview for the documentary The Memory of Justice, Rose said he would occasionally be attacked in public after leaving his house. Rose denied his guilt, insisting that his medical experiments served a humanitarian purpose.

== Disciplinary proceedings ==
After being released, Rose carried on his rehabilitation. As a so-called "131er" officials who had worked for the National Socialist state could work for the Federal Republic of Germany as civil servants. Because of a malfeasance in office, disciplinary proceedings were initiated in May 1956 against Rose. On October 24, 1960, he was acquitted from the Federal Disciplinary Body VII in Hamburg. A witness at the court was Rudolf Wohlrab, who had undertaken human experiments with typhus in Warsaw in 1940. At the time, he was in contact with Rose and Ernst Georg Nauck. Alexander Mitscherlich criticized the court's findings. Mitscherlich testified on 21 October 1960 as a witness because he had issued the document collection Science without humanity about the doctors' trial. According to Mitscherlich, the relevant documents were not in the court files.

== Literature ==
- Ebbinghaus, Angelika (Hrsg.): Vernichten und Heilen. Der Nürnberger Ärzteprozeß und seine Folgen. Aufbau-Taschenbuch-Verlag, Berlin 2002, ISBN 3-7466-8095-6.
- Dörner, Klaus (Hrsg.): Der Nürnberger Ärzteprozeß 1946/47. Wortprotokolle, Anklage- und Verteidigungsmaterial, Quellen zum Umfeld. Saur, München 2000, ISBN 3-598-32028-0 (Erschließungsband) ISBN 3-598-32020-5 (Mikrofiches).
- Ulrich Dieter Oppitz (Bearb.): Medizinverbrechen vor Gericht. Die Urteile im Nürnberger Ärzteprozeß gegen Karl Brandt und andere sowie aus dem Prozess gegen Generalfeldmarschall Milch. Palm und Enke, Erlangen 1999, ISBN 3-7896-0595-6.
- Mitscherlich, Alexander (Hrsg.): Medizin ohne Menschlichkeit. Dokumente des Nürnberger Ärzteprozesses. 16. Auflage, Fischer Taschenbuch, Frankfurt am Main 2004, ISBN 3-596-22003-3.
- Wolters, Christine: Humanexperimente und Hohlglasbehälter aus Überzeugung. Gerhard Rose – Vizepräsident des Robert-Koch-Instituts. In: Frank Werner (Hrsg.): Schaumburger Nationalsozialisten. Täter, Komplizen, Profiteure. Verlag für Regionalgeschichte, Bielefeld 2009, ISBN 978-3-89534-737-5, p. 407–444.

== See also ==
- Nazi human experimentation
- Doctors' Trial
- Kurt Blome
- Unit 731
- Yellow fever
- Erich Traub
- Claus Schilling
