= Kurt Albrecht =

Kurt Albrecht (31 December 1894, in Berlin – 7 May 1945, in Prague) was a Nazi German psychiatrist, neurologist, and lecturer.

== Biography ==
Albrecht studied medicine at the Humboldt University of Berlin and became a member of the Marchia Berlin Landsmannschaft in the winter semester of 1913/4. While still a student, he took part in the Kapp Putsch. He finished his studies in 1921 and received his doctorate. Albrecht was an assistant doctor at the Psychiatric Clinic of the Charité from the beginning of October 1921 under medical professor Karl Bonhoeffer. He later habilitated in 1930, and became a Privatdozent during that same year. Three years later, Albrecht became a professor at the University of Berlin.

Albrecht joined the SS on 1 November 1933 (SS number 139,960) and achieved the rank of SS-Untersturmführer. In 1937 he joined the NSDAP (membership number 4,830,422). He was also a member of the National Socialist Teachers League, the NS Lecturers (Association), the National Socialist People's Welfare and the National Socialist War Victim's Care.

After the Occupation of Czechoslovakia, Albrecht was appointed full professor of neurology and psychiatry at the Karl-Ferdinands-Universität in Prague. As successor to Eduard Gamper, he was director of the neurological and psychiatric university clinic. Albrecht became rector of the Karl-Ferdinands-Universität in August 1944 (November 1944 officially) after Friedrich Klausing's suicide, and held this office until May 1945. In the course of the Prague uprising at the end of the war, Czech and Soviet soldiers occupied the university. Albrecht subsequently met a violent death in his clinic by his captors at the beginning of May 1945.

== See also ==
- List of Nazi doctors
