= Bruno Kitt =

German physician and SS leader

Bruno Kitt (August 9, 1906 – October 8, 1946) was a German physician and SS leader. As a concentration camp doctor, he was employed at Auschwitz and Neuengamme.

Kitt was the son of a teacher. He initially began studying natural sciences after graduating from high school, before switching to and completing his medical degree at the University of Münster. Kitt became a member of the NSDAP in May 1933 as the party rose to power, and joined the SS (member 246.756) soon afterwards. He found a job with the Ruhr-Miners' Association in 1936, where he initially worked as an assistant and later as a senior medical examiner.

During World War II, he was drafted into the Waffen-SS in March 1942 and completed basic training at Sachsenhausen concentration camp. From June 1942 he was a camp doctor in the Auschwitz concentration camp where he acted as chief physician of the women's inmates' infirmary. It was during this role that he selected sick female prisoners for gassing. Kitt was also a camp doctor at Monowitz concentration camp (Auschwitz III), and had to be treated at least once for Typhus. Auschwitz survivor Hermann Langbein described Kitt as very intelligent and sometimes even approachable as a camp doctor who wasn't a fanatical Nazi. At once point he asked his superior Eduard Wirths to replace him as camp doctor so that he would not have to take part in selections. Although Wirths was briefly entrusted with the position of camp doctor, this did not relieve Kitt of selecting incoming prisoner transports.

In mid-September 1943, Kitt received the Second Class War Merit Cross with Swords and was promoted to SS Hauptsturmführer. Kitt met a laboratory assistant named Clare Maus in Auschwitz and the two soon fell in love. They were married in July 1944, and the couple had a son. After the evacuation of Auschwitz in January 1945, Kitt was transferred to Neuengamme in the following month. Kitt was assigned the role of "Troops doctor" there under Alfred Trzebinski until April/early May 1945. His final duties included being responsible for both the treatment of SS members in the camp, and inmates with regard to their ability to work.

As the Allied forces closed in, Kitt accompanied prisoner ambulance transports from the satellite camps of the Neuengamme concentration camp to the Sandbostel "reception camp". From there he accompanied a prisoner transport via Flensburg to Malmö and then returned to northern Germany. Kitt was arrested by the British Army after the war ended, and was a defendant at the Neuengamme-Hauptprozess (Neuengamme trials). He was found guilty of participating in the murder and mistreatment of prisoners at the Neuengamme concentration camp, and was sentenced to death by hanging on May 3, 1946. Kitt was executed in Hamelin on October 8, 1946, by hangman Albert Pierrepoint.

== See also ==
- List of Nazi doctors
- The Holocaust
