= Gustav Wilhelm Schübbe =

German physician

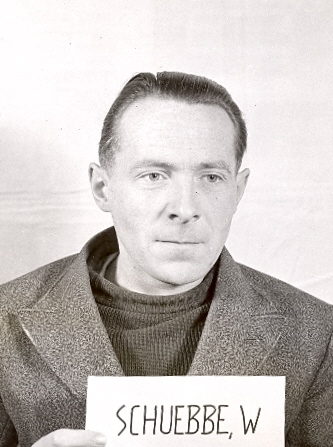
- Schübbe as a witness during the Nuremberg Trials.
- Born: March 31, 1910; Wanne-Eickel, Ruhr, German Empire
- Died: April 12, 1976 (aged 66); Hamburg, West Germany
- Occupation: Physician
- Known for: Witness during the Nuremberg Trials

Gustav Wilhelm Schübbe (March 31, 1910 – April 12, 1976) was a German physician.

== Life and work ==
Schübbe attended high school in Wanne-Eickel, where he passed his school exam in the spring of 1930. He then studied medicine at the universities of Munich, Münster and Freiburg and passed the state exam in 1936. Schübbe eventually received his doctorate from Heidelberg University with a thesis on paralysis during pregnancy. During World War II, Schübbe was temporarily entrusted with the management of a medical institute in Kyiv, Reichskommissariat Ukraine. It was here that from the perspective of the Nazi government, people who were undesirable or "unworthy of life" (Jews, "Gypsies", schizophrenics, etc.) were killed. This was usually done by injecting high concentrations of morphine (or morphine combined with tartaric acid), causing respiratory paralysis.

In April 1945 Schübbe became a US prisoner of war and admitted during an interrogation by Guy Stern that between 110,000 and 140,000 people had been killed there during the nine months in which he headed the Kyiv Institute. Time Magazine described the admission as a "monstrosity that appeared to top all previous tales of Nazi inhumanity." According to the Time article, Schübbe admitted that he himself had killed around 21,000 people in Kyiv who were deemed “unworthy of life”. Schübbe later served as a witness during the Nuremberg trials and Doctors' Trial where the charges against him were dropped. In the summer of 1947 Schübbe returned to his family in Hamburg.

In his later years, his daughter reported that he raved about the glories of the Third Reich and Nazi ideology at every meal. This in turn is thought to have had an impact on his son who was traumatized by the lectures. It was reported by the 'Hamburger Abendblatt' that his mentally ill 31-year-old son killed both Schübbe and his wife with a shovel on April 12, 1976.

== Writings ==
- Über Lähmungen in der Frühschwangerschaft (1937). (Thesis)

== Literature ==
- Abraham J. Peck: The German-Jewish legacy in America, 1938-1988, 1988.
- Walter Schmitz: Modernisierung oder Überfremdung?, 1994.
- World Jewish Congress: The Black Book. The Nazi Crime against the Jewish People, 1981.
