= Werner Villinger =

Nazi eugenicist (1887–1961)

Werner Villinger (9 October 1887 in Besigheim – 8 August 1961 near Innsbruck) was a Nazi German psychiatrist, neurologist, eugenicist and the leading physician at the Bethel Institution ("Anstalt Bethel"). Villinger's specialities included juvenile delinquency, child guidance and group therapy. He was a Professor of Psychiatry at the Philipps University of Marburg and a leading member of the World Federation for Mental Health (WFMH).

== Action T4 ==
Under the Germany's Nazi regime of the 1930s and '40s, Villinger acted as an expert in the government's T-4 Euthanasia Program.

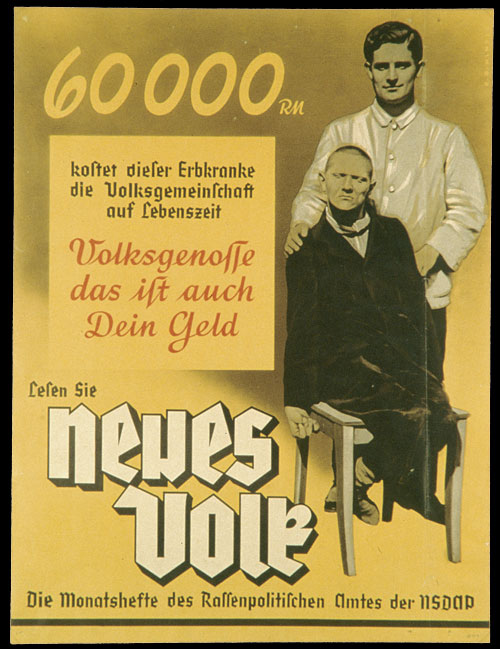
This poster (from around 1938) reads: "60,000 ℛ︁ℳ︁ is what this person suffering from a hereditary defect costs the People's community during his lifetime. Fellow citizen, that is your money too. Read '[A] New People', the monthly magazine of the Bureau for Race Politics of the NSDAP."

On Social Welfare Education Day 1934, Villinger gave a speech on sterilization and described the reaction, fears and resistance of the boys involved.

== Post-war ==
Villinger attended the U.S. White House Conference on Children and Youth. In 1951, he became co-chairman of the WFMH Health and Human Relations Conference at Hiddesen-near-Detmold. In 1952, he was a member of a WFMH group on Educating the Public whose Annual Conference met in Brussels. In 1952, he was elected president of the German Association for Child and Youth Psychiatry, and in 1954 became the head of the medical department of Philipps University of Marburg.

In 1961, the German Federal Authorities announced their intent to try Villinger for his actions under the Nazi regime. Before he could be tried, however, Villinger threw himself to his death off a mountain top near Innsbruck.

== See also ==
- Ernst Rüdin
- Euthanasia
- List of Nazi doctors
- Nazi eugenics
