= Joachim Mrugowsky =

German physician and war criminal (1905–1948)

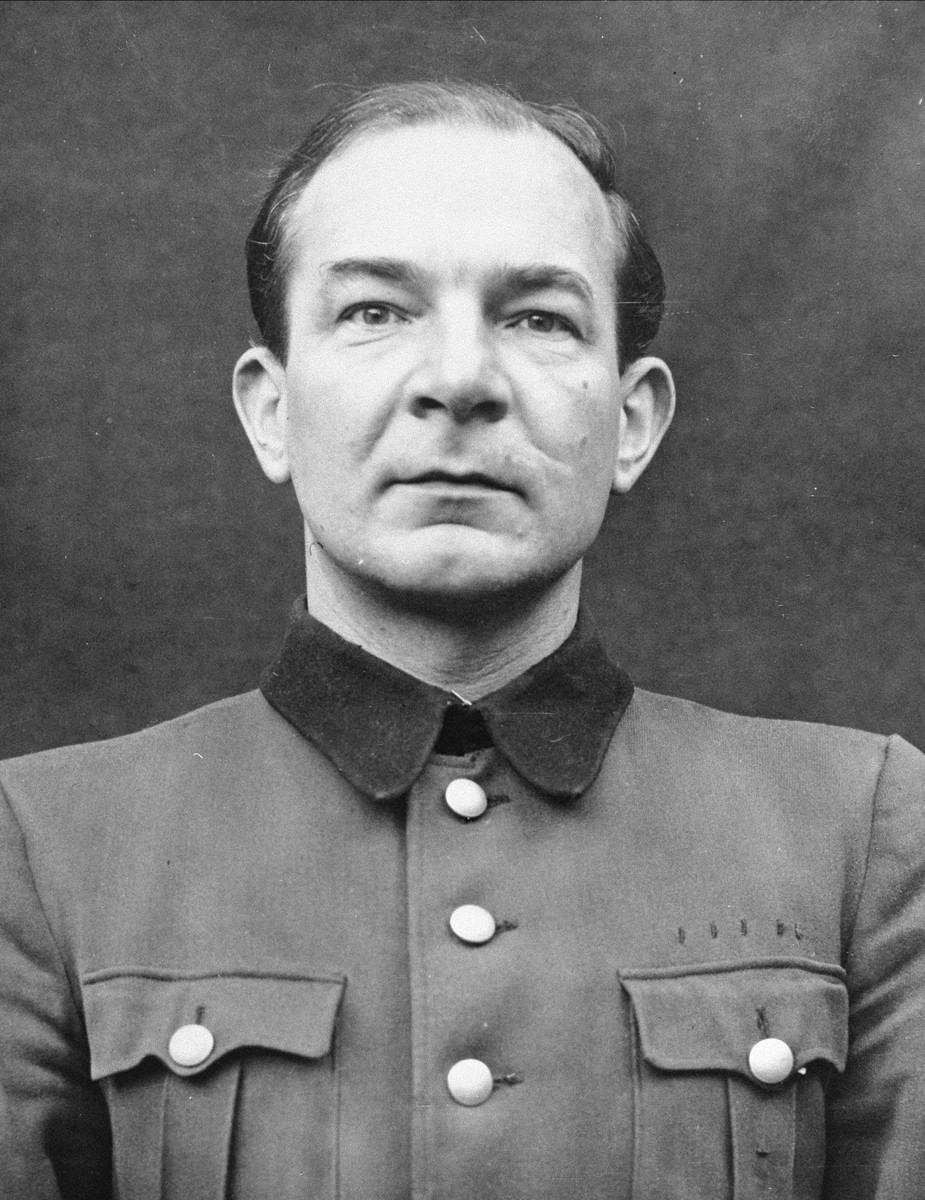
- Mugshot of Mrugowsky
- Born: 15 August 1905; Rathenow, German Empire
- Died: 2 June 1948 (aged 42); Landsberg Prison, Allied-occupied Germany
- Occupation: Bacteriologist
- Political party: Nazi Party
- Status: Executed by hanging
- Convictions: War crimes Crimes against humanity Membership in a criminal organization
- Trial: Doctors' Trial
- Penalty: Death

Joachim Mrugowsky (15 August 1905 – 2 June 1948) was a Nazi bacteriologist who committed medical atrocities at the Sachsenhausen concentration camp. He was Associate Professor, Medical Doctorate, Chief of Hygiene Institute of the Waffen-SS, Senior Hygienist at the Reich, SS-Physician, SS and Waffen-SS Colonel. He was found guilty of war crimes following the war in the Doctors' Trial and executed in 1948.

== Early life and education ==
Mrugowsky's father was a medical doctor. In 1925, Mrugowsky began his studies of natural sciences and medicine at the University of Halle. He completed the studies in 1930–1931 with a medical doctorate and a doctorate of natural sciences. 1930–1931 he was the Hochschulgruppenführer (University group leader) of the National Socialist German Students' League branch at the University of Halle. After a two-year internship, he became an assistant at the Hygiene Institute of the University of Halle. Mrugowsky was made an associate professor in the area of hygiene at the University of Berlin in September 1944.

== Nazi activities and war crimes ==
Since 1930, Mrugowsky had been involved in the Nazi ideology, first being the group leader of a local National Socialist German Students' Association then a NSDAP party member (No. 210,049). In 1931, he joined the SS, where he achieved the rank of Oberführer in both the General SS and the Waffen-SS.

Mrugowsky coordinated human experimentation at the Sachsenhausen concentration camp near Berlin. This included testing of typhus vaccines, and biological warfare agents including poisoned bullets and lethal injections.

== Trial and conviction ==
He was implicated in the Nazi human experimentation program, with the exception of the aviation experiments, which were conducted on concentration camp prisoners. Mrugowsky was convicted of various charges in the Doctors' Trial and sentenced to death in August 1947. He was executed on 2 June 1948. Unrepentant to the end, Mrugowsky's last words were, "I die as a German officer sentenced by a brutal enemy and conscious I never committed the crimes charged against me."
