= Friedrich Panse =

German psychiatrist (1899–1973)

- Born: 30 March 1899; Essen, German Empire
- Died: 6 December 1973 (aged 74); Bochum, West Germany
- Occupation: Psychiatrist
- Known for: Involvement with Nazi Germany's Aktion T4 euthanasia program

Friedrich Panse (30 March 1899 – 6 December 1973) was a German psychiatrist who became a prominent figure in Nazi‑era and post‑war German psychiatry. He served as an Aktion T4 expert who evaluated patients for the Nazis' euthanasia program. As an openly committed National Socialist, he actively promoted and taught racial‑hygiene ideology.

After the war, in 1948, Panse was tried, but he was acquitted. His defense that was that if he had not participated, even more patients would have died. He was then made director of the psychiatric clinic of the Medical Academy of the Rhine Hospital in Düsseldorf. In 1965 he was elected president of the German Society for Psychiatry and Neurology.

== See also ==
- Racial policy of Nazi Germany
- Werner Heyde
