= Alfred Ploetz =

German eugenicist and biologist

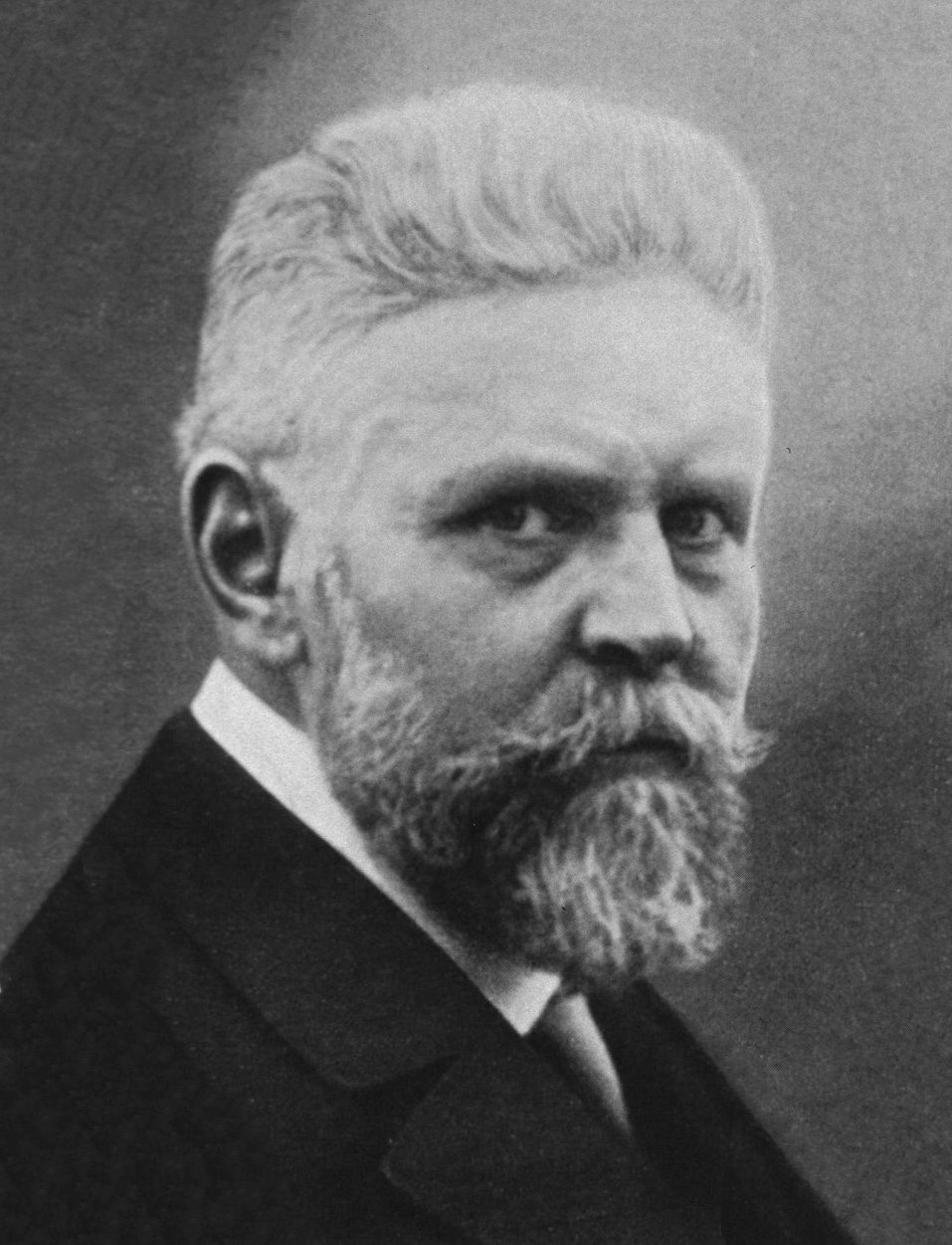
- Born: 22 August 1860; Swinemünde, Prussia (now Świnoujście, Poland)
- Died: 20 March 1940 (aged 79); Herrsching, Bavaria, Germany
- Education: Breslau (now Wrocław), Zürich
- Known for: Theory of racial hygiene: Grundlinien einer Rassenhygiene
- Spouse(s): Pauline Rüdin, Anita Nordenholz
- Partner: Agnes Bluhm
- Children: Three with second wife
- Scientific career
- Fields: Eugenics, genetics, medicine

Alfred Ploetz (22 August 1860 – 20 March 1940) was a German physician, biologist, Social Darwinist, and eugenicist known for coining the term racial hygiene (Rassenhygiene), a form of eugenics, and for promoting the concept in Germany.

== Early life ==
Ploetz was born in Swinemünde, Germany (now Świnoujście, Poland). He grew up and attended school in Breslau (now Wrocław). He was a friend of Carl Hauptmann, brother of the famous author Gerhart Hauptmann. In 1879, he founded a secret racial youth society. In Gerhart Hauptmann's drama Vor Sonnenaufgang ("Before Sunrise"), which was first performed on 20 October 1889 in Berlin, the key figure of the journalist Loth was based on Ploetz.

After he had finished school, Ploetz at first studied political economy in Breslau, where he joined the "Freie Wissenschaftliche Vereinigung" (Free Scientific Union). Among his friends were his brother, his former school friend Ferdinand Simon (later son-in-law of August Bebel), the brothers Carl and Gerhart Hauptmann, Heinrich Laux and Charles Proteus Steinmetz.

The circle enthusiastically read the works of Ernst Haeckel and Charles Darwin. Carl Hauptmann was a student of Haeckel, and Gerhart Hauptmann and Ploetz attended some of Haeckel's lectures. The group expanded and developed a plan of founding a colony in one of the Pacific states and established itself as the "Pacific Association". It planned a "community on friendly, socialist and maybe also pan-Germanic basis". In consequence of the prosecution of socialistically-minded persons in application of Otto von Bismarck's antisocialist laws (1878–1890), Ploetz in 1883 fled to Zürich, where he continued to study political economy with Julius Platter (1844–1923). In his memoirs, Ploetz stated as an important reason for his choice of Zürich that in his studies in Breslau, socialist theories had been only incidentally mentioned.

After living for a half a year in the United States, Ploetz returned to Zürich and began to study medicine. In 1886, he fell in love with a fellow student, Agnes Bluhm, but he was involved with Pauline Rüdin; the last two decided to get married early in 1887. Ploetz was also seeing an American, Mary Sherwood, who was studying hypnotism.

== Career ==
In 1890, Ploetz became a medical doctor and married his former girlfriend Pauline, but they never had children. Bluhm, however, kept Ploetz as a close friend throughout her life, and both shared similar views on racial purity and the benefits of eugenics. Ploetz and his wife lived in the United States for four years and divorced in 1898. Ploetz later married Anita Nordenholz, and they produced three children: Ulrich (called Uli), Cordelia (called Deda) and Wilfrid (called Fridl, 1912–2013).

Ploetz first proposed the theory of racial hygiene (race-based eugenics) in his "Racial Hygiene Basics" (Grundlinien einer Rassenhygiene) in 1895. In 1904, Ploetz founded the periodical Archiv für Rassen-und Gesellschaftsbiologie with Fritz Lenz as chief editor, which was the first journal in the world devoted to eugenic topics, and in 1905 founded the German Society for Racial Hygiene (Die Berliner Gesellschaft fur Rassenhygiene) with 31 members. In 1907 the society became the "International Society for Racial Hygiene".

== Nazi Germany ==
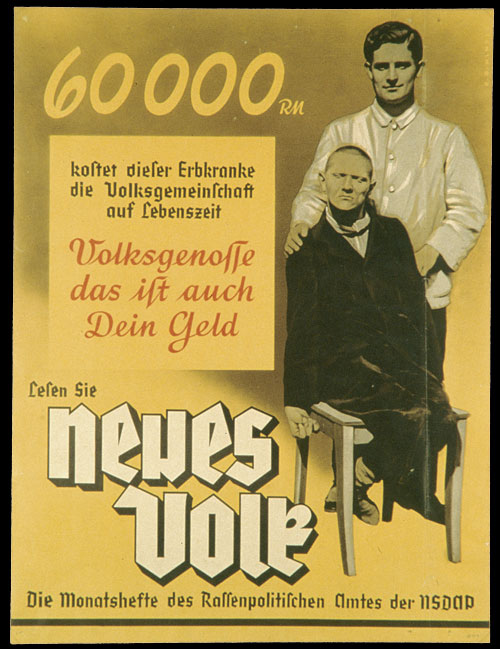
This poster (from around 1938) reads: "60,000 ℛ︁ℳ︁ is what this person suffering from a hereditary defect costs the People's community during his lifetime. Fellow citizen, that is your money too. Read '[A] New People', the monthly magazine of the Bureau for Race Politics of the NSDAP."

In 1930, he was made an honorary doctor of the Ludwig-Maximilians-Universität München and became a supporter of the Nazi Party, which was elected to power in 1933. Ploetz wrote in April that year that he believed that Hitler would bring racial hygiene from its previous marginality into the mainstream. In 1933, Reich Interior Minister Wilhelm Frick established an "expert advisory committee for population and racial policy", which included Ploetz, Fritz Lenz, Ernst Rüdin and Hans F.K. Günther. The expert advisory committee had the task of advising the Nazis on the implementation and enforcement of legislation regarding racial and eugenic issues. In 1936, Hitler appointed Ploetz to a professorship.

In 1937, at the age of 77, he joined the Nazi Party.

== Death and legacy ==
He died in 1940 at the age of 79 and is buried at his home in Herrsching on the Ammersee in Bavaria. After his death, Otmar Freiherr von Verschuer praised his "inner sympathy and enthusiasm [with] the National Socialist Movement". Ernst Rüdin, also a committed Nazi, had praised Ploetz two years earlier as a man "by his meritorious services has helped to set up our Nazi ideology".

== Theories ==
In his book The Excellence of Our Race and the Protection of the Weak (1895), Ploetz coined the term "racial hygiene" (German: Rassenhygiene); he described a society in which eugenic ideas would be applied. The publication endorsed a Social Darwinist interpretation of race and solidified genetic determinist ideas about the "evolutionary superiority of the German Volk". It would examine the moral and intellectual capacity of citizens to decide on marriage and the permitted number of children. It might include a prohibition on reproduction by the "unfit". Disabled children would be euthanized at birth, and all young persons would undergo an examination at puberty to determine if they would be permitted to marry and have children.

Society would be regulated strictly to ensure equal opportunity, and those who failed would starve. Ploetz found the idea horrible and suggested a humane alternative of simply encouraging only "fit" people to reproduce, but he called that a weak proposal.

Along with many other eugenicists in Europe and America, Ploetz believed in the superiority of the Nordic race. His writings were a major influence on Nazi ideology. His opinion of the Jewish question changed during the course of his life, but his view and the doctrine of the Nazi Party were in accord by the time it came to power in 1933.

In his early writings, Ploetz credited Jews as the highest cultural race after Europeans. He identified no substantial difference in "racial character" between Aryans and Jews and argued that the mental abilities of Jews and their role in the development of human culture made them indispensable to the "process of racial mix", which would enhance humanity:

The high aptitude of the Jews and their outstanding role in the progress of mankind considering men like Jesus, Spinoza, Marx has to be kindly acknowledged without hesitation... All this Antisemitism is a flop which will vanish slowly in the light of scientific knowledge and a humane democracy".

He revised that view. He stressed that the distinctiveness of Jews indicated that their mental characteristics would adversely affect Aryans by introducing individualism and lack of love for the military and the nation. Ploetz favoured the global dominance of the Aryan race.

== Bibliography ==
- (Alfred Hoche, Alfred Ploetz, Alfred Vierkandt, Carl Hans Heinze Sennhenn) German Eugenicists ISBN 9781230541914.
- (Alfred J Ploetz) Die Tüchtigkeit unsrer Rasse und der Schutz der Schwachen ISBN 1103490796.
- (Alfred J Ploetz) Archiv für Rassen- und Gesellschafts-Biologie, einschliesslich Rassen- und Gesellschafts-Hygiene 1908, Fuenfter Jahrgang ISBN 117441166X.

== See also ==
- Ernst Rüdin
- Eugen Fischer
- Eugenics
- Karl Binding
- Racial hygiene
- Wilhelm Schallmayer
