= Erwin Ding-Schuler =

German surgeon

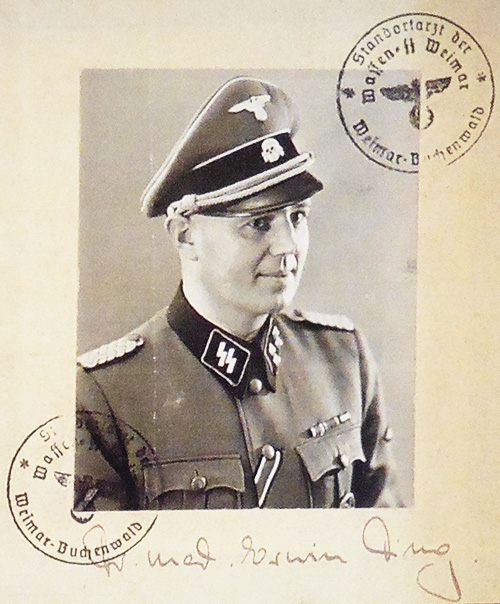
- Dr. med. Erwin Ding-Schuler
- Born: September 19, 1912; Bitterfeld, Germany
- Died: August 11, 1945 (aged 32); Freising, Germany
- Known for: Waffen-SS surgeon at Buchenwald
- Scientific career
- Fields: Medicine
- Academic advisors: Joachim Mrugowsky

Erwin Oskar Ding-Schuler (September 19, 1912 – August 11, 1945) was a German surgeon and an officer in the Waffen-SS who attained the rank of Sturmbannführer (Major). He is notable for having performed experiments on inmates of the Buchenwald concentration camp.

Ding-Schuler joined the NSDAP in 1932 and the SS in 1936. In 1937, he received his degree and passed his second state exam in medicine. In 1939, he became camp physician at Buchenwald and head of the division for spotted fever and viral research of the Waffen-SS Hygiene Institute in Weimar-Buchenwald. In July 1939, Ding-Schuler killed the pastor Paul Schneider with an overdose of g-Strophanthin; Schneider was later venerated as a martyr. He conducted extensive medical experiments on some 1,000 inmates, many of whom lost their lives, in Experimental Station Block 46, using various poisons as well as infective agents for spotted fever, yellow fever, smallpox, typhus, and cholera.

Ding-Schuler was arrested by U.S. troops on 25 April 1945. He committed suicide on 11 August 1945.

== See also ==
- Eugen Kogon
