= Carl Schneider =

Senior researcher for the Nazi German euthanasia programme (1891–1946)

Carl Schneider (December 19, 1891 in Gembitz, Kreis Mogilno, Province of Posen – December 11, 1946 in Frankfurt), professor at Heidelberg University, (1933–1945) chairman of its department of Psychiatry, director of its clinic, was a senior researcher for the Action T4 euthanasia program.

Schneider is said to exemplify the descent of a distinguished academic psychiatrist into the Nazi worldview. Some described him as having once shown great empathy in his psychiatric rehabilitation work, and having a great idealism about transforming the 'horror' of psychiatric patients thought to be regressed, isolated and backward. He would sometimes put forward two possible ways of helping a patient – one of them 'work therapy', and the other to sterilize or kill them.

Schneider joined the Nazi Party in 1932. He defined and elaborated the psychological assumptions of Nazi ideology and science. He coined the term national therapy for ethnic cleansing: ridding the populace of genetic and blood contaminants threatening the psychological and physical health of the German/Aryan population. He collected the brains of murdered Jews, mentally handicapped children, and other victims, for research in his clinic and for instruction. He taught a technique of replacing spinal fluid with air, to get clearer x-rays of the brain.

Schneider, along with Konrad Zucker, helped Heidelberg become one of the two leading training centres for the killing of children for theoretically scientific purposes, which went on at thirty clinics for three years.

== After the war; arrest and suicide ==
At the end of the war, Schneider flew out of Heidelberg on the 29 March 1945. The U.S. occupation authorities barred his reinstatement to the university's medical faculty, even before they learned of his role in the euthanasia program.

Later Schneider was arrested and moved to the internment camp at Moosburg an der Isar. On 29 November 1946, Schneider was given to the German justice authorities in Frankfurt am Main, to be a witness in the trial against Werner Heyde. Prosecutors allegedly told Schneider that in a trial his position would be very bad.

On 11 December 1946, Schneider hanged himself in his prison cell awaiting trial in Frankfurt am Main. His co-workers were not punished and could continue their work. His membership in the Heidelberg academy of sciences was deleted.

== See also ==
- List of people who died by suicide by hanging

== Sources ==
- Friedlander, Henry (1995). The Origins of Nazi Genocide: From Euthanasia to the Final Solution. Chapel Hill: University of North Carolina Press. ISBN 0-8078-4675-9.
- Kaplan, Robert M. (2009). Medical Murder: Disturbing Cases of Doctors Who Kill. Crows Nest, N.S.W.: Allen & Unwin. ISBN 978-1-74175-610-4.
- William E. Seidelman (December 7, 1996). "Nuremberg lamentation: for the forgotten victims of medical science". BMJ. 313 (7070). BMJ Group: 1463–7. doi:10.1136/bmj.313.7070.1463. PMC 2352986. PMID 8973236.
