= Racial hygiene =

20th-century eugenics approach

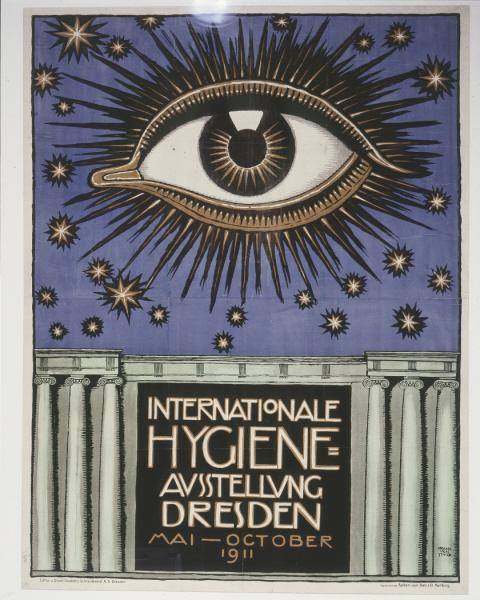
International Hygiene Exhibition, 1911 promotional poster

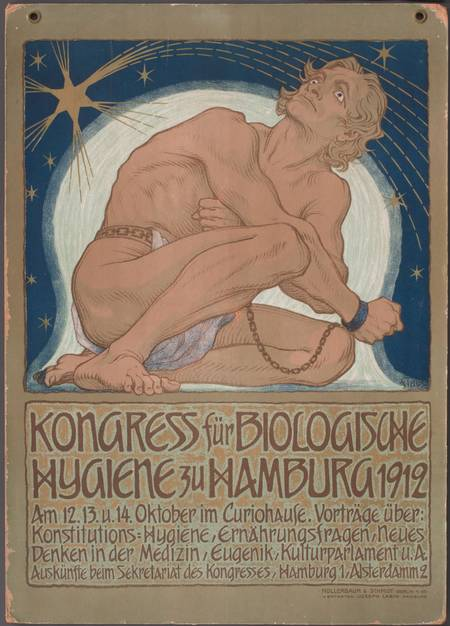
Poster for the Hygiene Congress in Hamburg, 1912

The term racial hygiene was used to describe an approach to eugenics in the early 20th century, which found its most extensive implementation in Nazi Germany (Nazi eugenics). It was marked by efforts to avoid miscegenation, analogous to an animal breeder seeking purebred animals. This was often motivated by the pseudoscientific belief in the existence of a racial hierarchy and the related fear that "lower races" would "contaminate" a "higher" one. As with most eugenicists at the time, racial hygienists believed that the lack of eugenics would lead to rapid social degeneration, the decline of civilization by the spread of inferior characteristics.

Like eugenics, racial hygiene was largely discredited and abandoned following World War II.

== Development ==
The German eugenicist Alfred Ploetz introduced the term "racial hygiene" (Rassenhygiene) in 1895 in his Racial Hygiene Basics (Grundlinien einer Rassenhygiene). He discussed the importance of avoiding "counterselective forces" such as war, inbreeding, free healthcare for the poor, alcohol and venereal disease. In its earliest incarnation it was more concerned by the declining birthrate of the German state and the increasing number of mentally-ill and disabled people in state-run institutions (and their costs to the state) than it was by the "Jewish question" and the "degeneration of the Nordic race" (Entnordung) which would come to dominate its philosophy in Germany from the 1920s to the Second World War.

During the last years of the 19th century, the German racial hygienists Alfred Ploetz and Wilhelm Schallmayer regarded certain people as inferior, and they opposed their ability to procreate. These theorists believed that all human behaviors, including crime, alcoholism and divorce, were caused by genetics.

== Nazi Germany ==
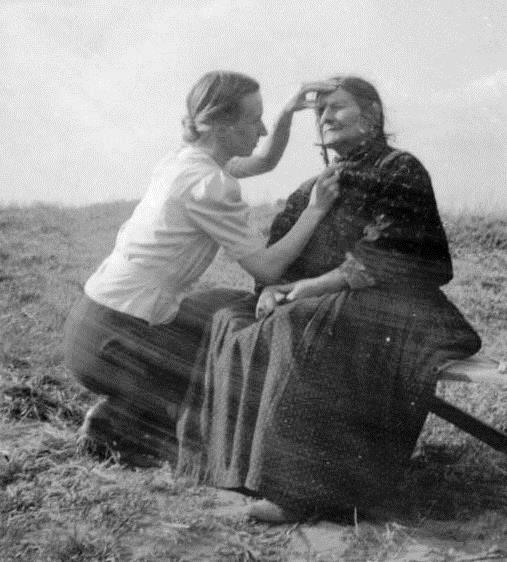
Eva Justin checking the facial characteristics of a Romani woman, as part of her racial studies

During the 1930s and 1940s, institutes in Nazi Germany studied genetics, created genetic registries and researched twins. Nazi scientists also studied blood, and developed theories on the supposed racial specificity of blood types, with the goal of distinguishing an "Aryan" from a Jew by examining their blood. In the 1940s, Josef Mengele, a doctor in the Schutzstaffel (SS), provided human remains that were taken from Auschwitz – blood, limbs and other body parts – to be studied at the institutes. Harnessing racial hygiene as a justification, the scientists used prisoners from Auschwitz and other concentration camps as test subjects for their human experiments.

Theories on racial hygiene led to an elaborate sterilization program, with the goal of eliminating what the Nazis regarded as diseases harmful to the human race. Sterilized individuals, reasoned the Nazis, would not pass on their diseases to their children. The Sterilization Law, passed on July 14, 1933, also known as the Law for the Prevention of Hereditarily Diseased Offspring, called for the sterilization of any person who had a genetically determined illness. The Sterilization Law was drafted by some of Germany's top racial hygienists, including: Fritz Lenz, Alfred Ploetz, Ernst Rudin, Heinrich Himmler, Gerhard Wagner and Fritz Thyssen. Robert N. Proctor has shown that the list of illnesses which the law targeted included "feeblemindedness, schizophrenia, manic depression, epilepsy, Huntington's chorea, genetic blindness, and 'severe alcoholism.'" The estimated number of citizens who were sterilized in Nazi Germany ranges from 350,000 to 400,000. As a result of the Sterilization Law, sterilization medicine and research soon became one of the largest medical industries.

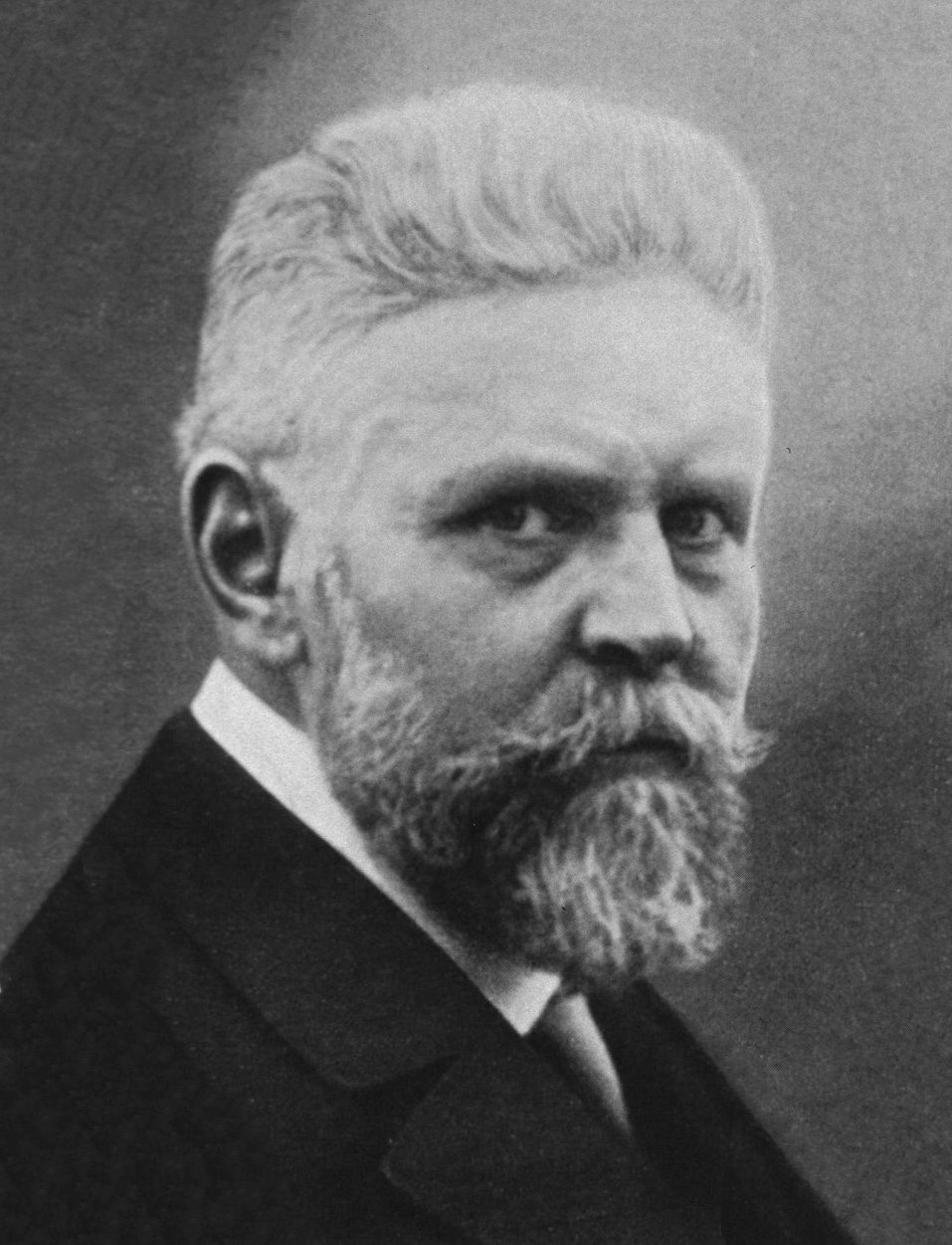
Alfred Ploetz introduced the term "racial hygiene" in 1895.

In Nazi propaganda, the term "race" was often interchangeably used to mean the "Aryan" or Germanic "Übermenschen", which was said to represent an ideal and pure master race that was biologically superior to all other races. In the 1930s, under eugenicist Ernst Rüdin, National Socialist ideology embraced this latter use of "racial hygiene", which demanded Aryan racial purity and condemned miscegenation. That belief in the importance of German racial purity often served as the theoretical backbone of Nazi policies of racial superiority and later genocide. The policies began in 1935, when the National Socialists enacted the Nuremberg Laws, which legislated racial purity by forbidding sexual relations and marriages between Aryans and non-Aryans as Rassenschande (racial shame).

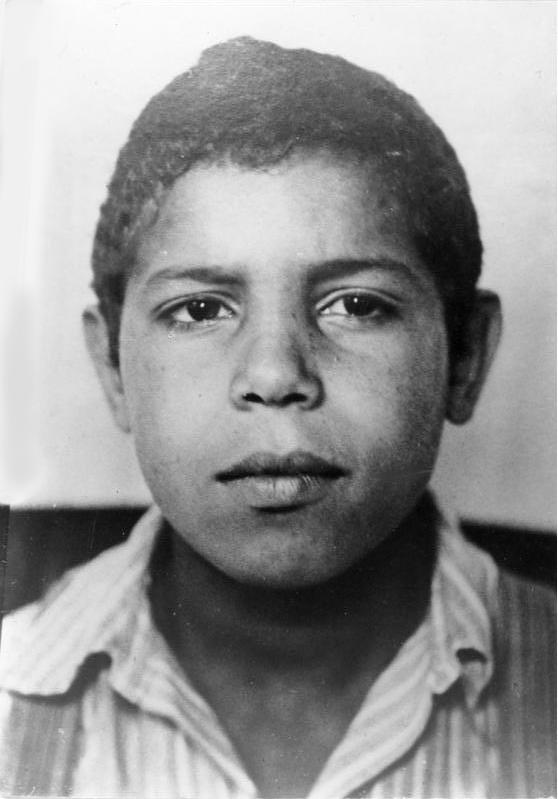
Young Rhinelander who was classified as a Rhineland bastard and hereditarily unfit under the Nazi regime as a result of his mixed race heritage

Racial hygienists played key roles in the Holocaust, the German National Socialist effort to purge Europe of Jews, Romani people, Slavs, Blacks, mixed race people, and physically or intellectually disabled people. In the Aktion T4 program, Hitler ordered the execution of mentally-ill patients by euthanasia under the cover of deaths from strokes and illnesses. The methods and equipment that had been used in the murder of thousands of mentally ill persons were then transferred to concentration camps, because the materials and resources needed to efficiently murder large numbers of people existed and had been proven successful. The nurses and the staff who had assisted and performed the killings were then moved along with the gas chambers to the concentration camps, which were being built in order to be able to replicate the mass murders repeatedly.

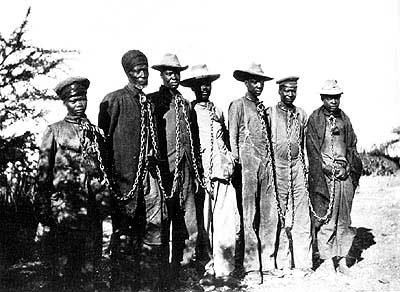
Herero chained by German captors during the 1904 rebellion in German South West Africa

The doctors who carried out experiments on the prisoners in concentration camps specialised in racial hygiene and used the supposed science to back their medical experiments. Some of the experiments were used for general medical research, for example by injecting prisoners with known diseases to test vaccines or possible cures. Other experiments were used to further the Germans' war strategy by putting prisoners in vacuum chambers to see what could happen to pilots' bodies if they were ejected at a high altitude or immerse prisoners in ice water to see how long they would survive and what materials could be used to prolong life if worn by German pilots shot down over the English Channel. The precursors of this notion were earlier medical experiments which German doctors performed on African prisoners of war in concentration camps in Namibia during the Herero and Nama genocide.

A key aspect of National Socialism was the concept of racial hygiene and it was elevated to the primary philosophy of the German medical community, first by activist physicians within the medical profession, particularly amongst psychiatrists. That was later codified and institutionalized during and after the Nazis' rise to power in 1933, during the process of Gleichschaltung (literally, "coordination" or "unification"), which streamlined the medical and mental hygiene (mental health) profession into a rigid hierarchy with National Socialist-sanctioned leadership at the top.

The blueprint for Nazism's attitude toward other races was written by Erwin Baur, Fritz Lenz, and Eugen Fischer and published under the title Human Heredity Theory and Racial Hygiene (1936).

== After World War II ==
After World War II, the idea of "racial hygiene" was denounced as unscientific by many, but there continued to be supporters and enforcers of eugenics even after there was widespread awareness of the nature of Nazi eugenics. After 1945, eugenics proponents included Julian Huxley and Marie Stopes, but they typically removed or downplayed the racial aspects of their theories.

== See also ==
- Apartheid
- Emperor of Japan#Succession (Bansei ikkei)
- Blood purity
- Casta
- Compulsory sterilization
- Endogamy
- Ethnic cleansing
- Ethnic nationalism
- Genetic pollution
- Lebensborn
- Master race
- Mental hygiene
- Miscegenation
- Monoethnicity
- One-drop rule
- Outcrossing
- Purebred
- Race of the future
- Racial segregation
- Social hygiene
