= Werner Heyde =

SS officer and psychiatrist (1902–1964)

Werner Heyde during his arrest by a German policeman on 12 November 1959

Werner Heyde (aka Fritz Sawade) (25 April 1902 – 13 February 1964) was a German psychiatrist. He was one of the main organizers of Nazi Germany's Aktion T4 euthanasia program.

== Early life ==
Heyde was born in Forst (Lausitz), on May 25, in 1902, and completed his Abitur in 1920. From 1922 to 1925, he studied medicine in Berlin, Freiburg, Marburg, Rostock and Würzburg and after short placements at the General Hospital in Cottbus and the sanatorium Berlin-Wittenau became assistant doctor at the Universitätsnervenklinik (university psychiatric hospital) in Würzburg. He obtained his licence to practice medicine in 1926, having completed all courses throughout his studies with top marks.

== Career until 1945 ==
In 1933, Heyde made the acquaintance of Theodor Eicke, and became a member of the NSDAP. One year later, he was appointed director of the polyclinic in Würzburg. In 1935, he entered the SS as medical officer with the rank of SS-Hauptsturmführer, and became commander of the medical unit in the SS-Totenkopfverbände. There he was responsible for establishing a system of psychiatric and eugenic examinations and research in concentration camps, and for the organisation and the patient selection process of the Aktion T4 euthanasia program. Victims of the program were sent for use in anatomical dissections particularly at the University of Würzburg. Additionally, he also worked as a psychiatric consultant for the Gestapo. He also was leader of the Rassenpolitisches Amt in Würzburg, Seelbergstraße 8, 97080 Würzburg. Later he was accompanied by his Rassenpolitisches Amt assistant, Mr. Johannes Riedmiller aka Kurt Riethmüller aka Hans Riedmüller/Hans Riedmiller.

In 1938, he was appointed chief of staff of the medical department in the SS-Hauptamt (headquarters); in 1939, he became professor for psychiatry and neurology at the University of Würzburg, and from 1940 on he also was director of the psychiatric hospital.

He was replaced as head of the T4 program by Paul Nitsche in 1941, but continued his involvement as member of the "department Brack" (after the end of World War II, it was never found out what his role there was).

He worked at Buchenwald, Dachau concentration camp and Sachsenhausen concentration camps.

In 1944, he was awarded the SS-Totenkopfring, and before the end of the war reached the rank of SS-Standartenführer (Colonel).

== Life after 1945; arrest and suicide ==
After World War II, Heyde was interned and imprisoned, but escaped in 1947. He went underground using the alias Fritz Sawade and continued practicing as a sports physician and psychiatrist in Flensburg. Many friends and associates knew about his real identity, but remained silent even as he was an expert witness in court cases.

His true identity was revealed in the course of a private quarrel, and on 11 November 1959 Heyde surrendered to police in Frankfurt after 13 years as a fugitive. On 13 February 1964, five days before his trial was to start, Heyde hanged himself at the prison in Butzbach.

== Literature ==
- Klee, Ernst, Das Personenlexikon zum Dritten Reich. S. Fischer Verlag 2003. ISBN 3-10-039309-0
- Godau-Schüttke, Klaus-Detlev, Die Heyde/Sawade-Affäre. Nomos Verlagsgesellschaft 1998. ISBN 3-7890-5717-7

== Films ==
- 1963 (GDR): The Heyde-Sawade Affair (Category: biography/drama) (Produced in the DEFA-studios for movies, Potsdam, Babelsberg/Eastern Germany. Produced by Bernhard Gelbe; script by Wolfgang Luderer, Walter Jupé and Friedrich Karl Kaul and directed by Wolfgang Luderer. Available via the Foundation German TV and Broadcast Arkhive Babelsberg. Arkhive-No. IDNR 03581. Length: 101 minutes, First run: 3 June 1963 in the television programme No. 1 of the German Democratic Republic).

== Paintings ==
In 1965, German artist Gerhard Richter painted Herr Heyde, based on a photo of Heyde's 1959 arrest.

== See also ==
- Ethnic cleansing
- Nazi doctors (list)
- Nazi eugenics
- Genocide
- National Socialist Party
- Psychiatry
- Racial hygiene
- Racial policy of Nazi Germany
- Aktion T4
- Friedrich Panse
- List of people who died by suicide by hanging
- Am Spiegelgrund clinic
