= Paul Nitsche =

German psychiatrist (1876–1948)

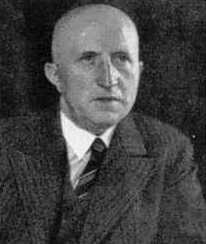
- Born: Hermann Paul Nitsche; November 25, 1876; Pfuhlsborn, German Empire
- Died: March 25, 1948 (aged 71); Münchner Platz Prison, Dresden, Allied-occupied Germany
- Political party: Nazi Party
- Status: Executed by guillotine
- Motive: Nazism
- Conviction: Crimes against humanity
- Penalty: Death

Details
- Victims: Tens of thousands
- Span of crimes: 1940–1945
- Targets: Mentally ill and intellectually disabled people

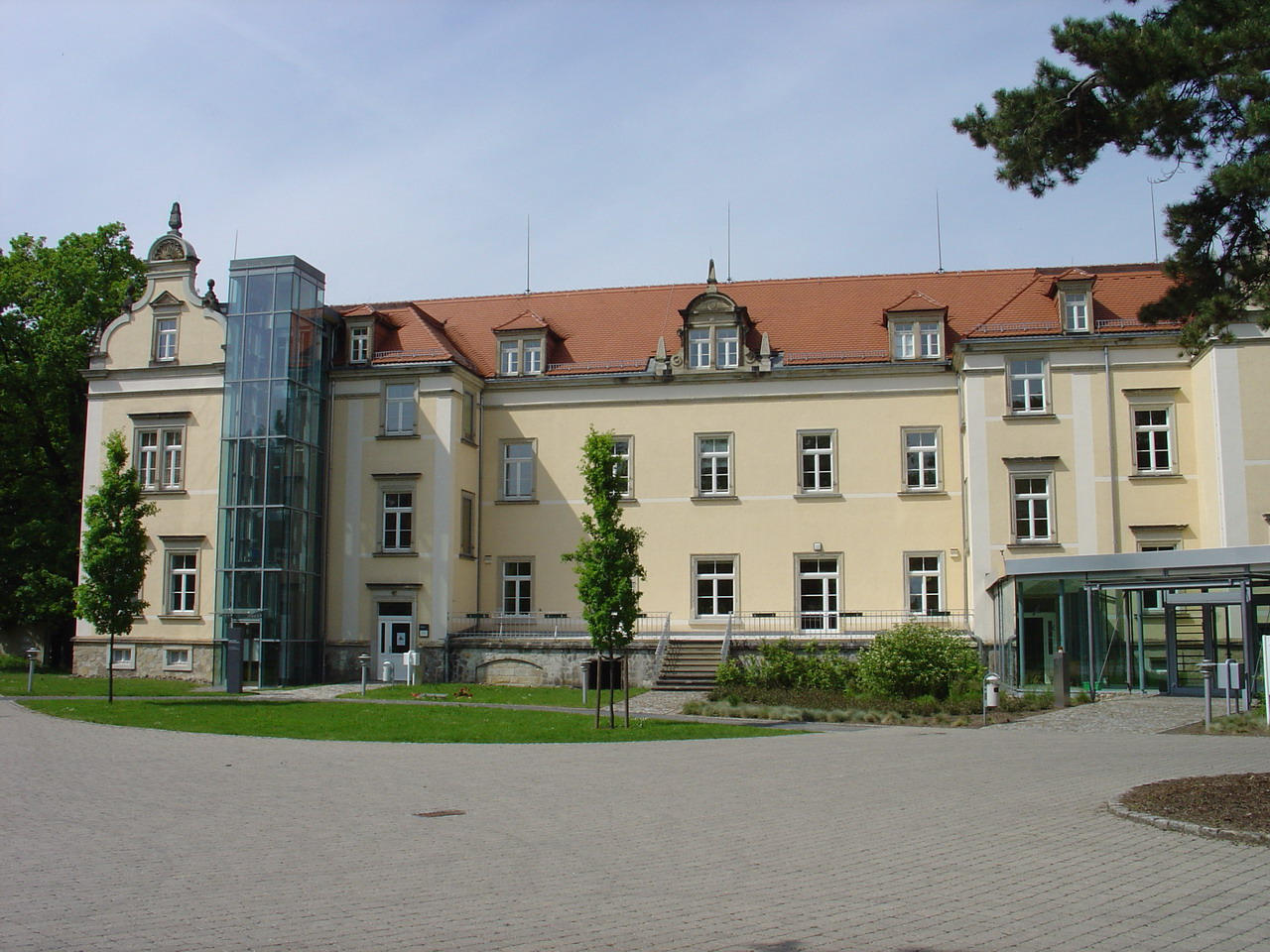
House 16, Schloss Sonnenstein, as a memorial

Hermann Paul Nitsche (November 25, 1876 – March 25, 1948) was a German psychiatrist and war criminal known for his expert endorsement of the Third Reich's euthanasia authorization and who later headed the Medical Office of the T-4 Euthanasia Program. Nitsche was condemned to death for crimes against humanity for killing over one thousand people, and guillotined in March 1948 in Dresden.

== Early life ==
Nitsche was born in 1876 in Colditz, Saxony. His father, Hermann Nitsche, was a psychiatrist. He attended elementary school (German: ''Volksschule'') in Pirna from 1882 to 1887.

== Career ==
Nitsche received his medical license in 1901 and a professorship in 1925. Nitsche did not join the Nazi Party until May 1933. He was a strong supporter of eugenics and euthanasia and was present at the gassing demonstration at what would become the Brandenburg euthanasia center in either December 1939 or January 1940. He was driven not so much by Nazi racial ideology as by his own support of racial science and his vision of "progressive medicine". Being well established, Nitsche was no longer motivated by the prospect of career advancement but was rather ideologically committed when he later joined Action T4.

== Euthanasia ==
He was deputy director of the Sonnenstein Clinic from 1913 to 1918 and director of the institution from 1928 to 1939. In 1940, he became deputy director of the Action T4 Medical Office (German: Medizinische Abteilung) under Werner Heyde, which had a front organization called the Reich Cooperative for State Hospitals and Nursing Homes (German: Reichsarbeitsgemeinschaft Heil- und Pflegeanstalten) that handled the registration, evaluation, and selection of patients for adult euthanasia. As the T4 program's chief physician, Nitsche was responsible for corresponding with mental health institutions about registering and transferring patients to be euthanized.

He succeeded Heyde as head of the Medical Office in December 1941.

== Trial and execution ==
He was arrested on November 4, 1945. His trial took place from June 16, 1947, to July 7, 1947. He was condemned to death for crimes against humanity on the basis of Allied Control Council Law No. 10 for killing over one thousand people. He attempted to justify his actions, saying they were intended to free the sick from pain. He was executed by guillotine on March 25, 1948, in Dresden.

== See also ==
- Action T4
- Doctors' Trial
- Saxon Psychiatric Museum
