= Fritz Hartung (jurist) =

German judge (1884–1973)

- Born: 4 April 1884; Homberg (Kassel), Hesse-Nassau, Prussia, Germany
- Died: 14 May 1973; Göttingen, Lower Saxony German Federal Republic (West Germany)
- Occupations: Jurist; Judge; Government legal advisor Legal reformer University teacher Journalist-commentator
- Political party: SPD; DNVP; DDP; NSDAP
- Spouse: Else Stoffers

Fritz Hartung (4 April 1884 - 14 May 1973) was a German jurist and influential advisor on law reform at the Justice Ministry during the 1920s. After the war he became more widely known as a commentator on criminal law and criminal process in the German Federal Republic (West Germany).

== Biography ==
=== Provenance and early years ===
Fritz Hartung was born at Homberg, a small town in the hills south of Kassel. His father was a specialist teacher of the deaf and dumb. He attended school locally, passing his school final exams with high marks early in 1903 as a pupil at the Wilhelmsgymnasium (secondary school) in Kassel. Later that year he enrolled at the University of Marburg to study Classical Philology. After a term he switched to Jurisprudence.

His lecturers at Marburg included the scholar-politician Ludwig Enneccerus and Ludwig Traeger. As a student he was a member of the "Germania Marburg" student fraternity, with which he would retain connections throughout his life. Reinhard Frank was among his "fraternity brothers". After two years Hartung switched to Leipzig, where he studied for the first half of his third student year.

At Leipzig his lecturers included the historian-jurist Rudolph Sohm, the legal scholar Adolf Wach and the controversialist jurist Karl Binding. For the second half of his third year he returned to Marburg, receiving his law degree the next term. At the end of January 1907, he also passed his Level 1 National Law Exams, his exam result sweetened with a "good" commendation.

=== Lawyer ===
On leaving university during the middle part of 1907 he embarked on his legal apprenticeship, employed as a trainee at the local court in Homberg. At the same time he started work on a doctorate under the supervision of Friedrich André. (It is unclear whether he ever completed and submitted a doctoral dissertation.)

In October 1907, there came an abrupt change of focus when Hartung embarked on his Military Service, joining the 114th Infantry Regiment, based near the Swiss border at Konstanz.

A year later, having reached the rank of sergeant, he left the army while still listed as a member of the army reserve. He resumed his legal apprenticeship at the Criminal Chamber of the Kassel District Court. In 1909 he was forced to defer completion of his training period by a recurrence of the illness that he had contracted during his year of military service. Later he returned to the District Court and completed his training, both in the criminal law section and in the civil law section. His apprenticeship complete, he remained at the District Court, working under the judges Karl Martin and Walter von Hagens. He passed his Level 2 National Law Exams in December 1912, again earning the "good" commendation, and was promoted to the position of "Assessor", a junior judicial function, which came with opportunities to deputise for more senior judges.

In 1913, he relocated to Berlin and in April accepted a government job, joining the legal department of the national postal service ("Reichspostamt"). He would later describe these 1½ years in Berlin as the happiest period of his life. He found time to participate regularly in a series of seminars conducted by the iconic criminal law reformer Franz von Liszt, who was to prove a lasting influence on him.

=== War years ===
War broke out in July 1914 and Hartung was conscripted back into the army less than a month later. He fought in the 20th Infantry Regiment, and saw action both on the "Western Front" and in the Serbia campaign. In March 1915 news reached him while he was in the trenches of north-eastern France that he had been appointed a district judge at the Frankfurt district court. By 1916 he had been awarded the Iron Cross ist class (medal) and reached the rank of a junior officer in the army reserve. The next year, following a recurrence of serious illness, in March 1917 he was appointed to a position as an adjutant with the "Stabsdienst" ("Service Staff"). He worked in the inspectorate of the 7th Army, a role in which in the end he rose to the rank of deputy General Staff Officer. He was demobilised at Treysa in October 1918, and as the war drew to an end he took no further part in the fighting.

At the start of 1919, back in Frankfurt, Hartung was able to step into the judicial post he had accepted from the western front four years earlier. He was able to work, between April 1919 and May 1920, as a "Syndikus" (legal advisor/administrator)) on behalf of the city housing department. Meanwhile, while the courts were closed for the holidays, he became engaged to Else Stoffers, the youngest daughter of the city treasurer of Hameln, some way to the north of Frankfurt.

In January 1920, it was at Hameln that the couple married, but they continued to be based in Frankfurt.

=== Prussian Justice Ministry ===
In June 1920, Hartung was appointed to a job as an assistant at the Prussian Justice Ministry in Berlin. According to a surviving letter of April 1920 the appointment was originally intended to last for a few months, and involved providing holiday cover for a permanent staff member. He was assigned to the Criminal Justice Department to work on the "clemency cases" ("Gnadensachen").

In his new workplace he came across the criminologist-commentator Albert Hellwig who had joined the department at the same time. Hellwig became a valued colleague and then a friend. In 1921 new age limits for public service were introduced. Hartung was moved up the rankings, becoming an administrator-consultant for criminal trials and a "Korreferent", co-ordinating evidential material for presentation at trials. At the same time, he was promoted to the position of "Oberjustizrat" (senior court official), thereby becoming in 1922 a permanent ministry employee.

In 1923, he became a "Ministerialrat" a senior legal official at the Prussian ministry. He worked closely and in parallel with the Criminal Justice department at the National Justice Ministry, at that time under Ministerial Director Erwin Bumke. Those in the German ministry with whom Hartung, representing the Prussian ministry, worked particularly closely included Leopold Koffka and Wilhelm Kiesow, whose own speciality centred around criminal law procedure, along with Leopold Schäfer and Wolfgang Mettgenberg (International Criminal Law).

Hartung worked on a number of important pieces of legislation during the 1920s. He was involved in drafting the original 1923 Youth Crime Law ("Jugendgerichtsgesetz"). He evaluated critically the Goldschmidt/Schiffer draft of 1919/20, thereby triggering the Emminger amendments, and oversaw the implementation of these in Prussia. In effect, that meant that Hartung drafted what became the 1924 Prussian Arbitration Regulations. which extended the "mandatory atonement" requirement to six additional classes of offence. Subsequent Arbitration Law in most respects retained these amendments. Fritz Hartung's interest in arbitration process is evident from the specialist monthly journal "Schiedsmannszeitung" (loosely, "Arbitration Newspaper"), of which he was the producer and principal contributor between 1926 and 1967.

Between 1924 and 1929, Fritz Hartung was involved with criminal law reform. He saw himself as following in the footsteps of Franz von Liszt and the so-called "Marburg Programme". For Liszt the criminal law was essentially a preventive structure rather than a rehabilitative one. Hartung was accordingly concerned to use the Criminal Law give effect to a preventive theory of criminal justice, designed to provide security, amelioration and deterrence. From this period also dates Hartung's life-long association with Alfred Bozi, a pioneering advocate of "Resocialisation". Hartung devised the official 1925 draft for a "General Criminal Law Code" which was placed before parliament in 1927 and was subject to scrutiny and deliberation till 1930. He worked on the "Strafregisterverordnung" (loosely, "Crimininal Registry Ordinance") of 1926 and also, together with Mettgenberg, drew up the German Extradition Law of that time.

=== Supreme Court: 1929 - 1945 ===
On 18 November 1929 Hartung was nominated as a candidate for judicial appointment to the Supreme Court in Leipzig by the Justice Minister Hermann Schmidt. There seems to have been an element of political calculation involved. A few months earlier, in August 1929, Fritz Hartung became a member of the "Republic Judges Association" ("Republikanische Richterbund"). He then, in September 1929, became a member of the centre-left Democratic Party (DDP) with which the "Republic Judges Association" had close links. After this example of what one underwhelmed commentator defines as an "opportunistic discovery of [Weimar republic] democracy", had served its purpose, Hartung immediately resigned his membership of the DDP, and in 1932 he also withdrew from membership of the "Republic Judges Association". By that time he had secured appointment, effective 1 December 1929, as an Associate Judge of the Supreme Court ("Reichsgerichtsrat"). He would serve as a member of the Supreme Court's Third Criminal Senate (i.e. Court Division) between 1929 and 1945.

In 1930 the University of Münster conferred an honorary doctorate on Hartung. It was also in 1930 that he received his Habilitation (higher post-graduate degree) from the University of Halle (a short train journey from Leipzig where the Supreme Court was located). His Habilitation also had an "honorary" element: unusually, it was awarded without any requirement that he should submit and defend a degree dissertation (or other written piece composed for the purpose). Between 1931 and 1933 Hartung taught at the University of Halle as a "Privatdozent" (tutor-lecturer). An attempt to gain an honorary professorship at the University of Halle was unsuccessful, however.

After several years during which German politics became increasingly polarised and the Reichstag deadlocked, the Hitler government took power in January 1933 and over the course of a few months transformed Germany into a one-party dictatorship. One of the less well publicised side-effects of this came in Autumn/Fall 1933 when Supreme Court judges of the Fourth Civil Senate, to which Hartung had recently transferred, had their "Veniae Legendi" (university teaching rights) withdrawn. Hartung switched back to the Third Criminal Senate in 1934, though it is not clear that he found time to return to teaching at this stage.

During the Hitler years Hartung, as a member of the Third Criminal Senate, is seen as one of those responsible for case law in support of the government's infamous "Race Defilement" ("Rassenschande") doctrine. The court on a number of occasions interpreted the 1935 "Law for the Protection of German Blood and German Honour" in line with known National Socialist dogmas even where not required to do so by the wording of the law itself. For some of this period Fritz Hartung was himself deputy head of the Third Criminal Senate. In 1945, after the Nazi nightmare had been terminated by military defeat, Hartung nevertheless asserted that under Supreme Court President Erwin Bumke, the Third Criminal Senate could take some credit for having "prevented worse".

In a book published in 1971, a couple of years before his death, Hartung provided a lengthier lawyerly mitigation plea in respect of legal developments in Germany during the twelve National Socialist years: "...in terms of the justice system, and in particular when it came to criminal justice, the National Socialist régime ... delivered some progressive elements of a fundamental nature ..., improvements which endure to this day, and the removal of which from the criminal code is unthinkable".

In 1954 Hartung cited the tragic 1940 "Badewannenfall" ("Bath Tub Case"), in which he had presided, as an example of an ad hoc extended legal interpretation of the "subjektive Teilnahmelehre" (loosely, "subjective inducement to participate") doctrine, which he said he had applied in order to reverse a decision by a lower court whereby he was able to avoid imposing an otherwise mandatory death sentence on a young girl who had drowned her sister's new-born baby at the overwhelming insistence of the sister. (Note: The "loophole" through which the Third Criminal Senate (court presided over by Fritz Hartung) had jumped came from the fact that the relevant law made a clear distinction between perpetrators and accomplices. The participants in the act were to be differentiated between either (1) instigators or (2) helpers. But the law was silent on the precise difference between the two. By resorting to what other German judges would surely have viewed as unwarranted over-interpretation, the court under Hartung preserved the girl who had actually killed her terrified sister's new-born infant from the death penalty. Hartung, when recalling the case fourteen years later, held it out as classic case of the end justifying the means in the event of an extreme case. The case involved two farmgirls who were sisters and who had become pregnant by the same man - possibly their father. The father was tyrannical. One of the sisters secretly gave birth to her child and immediately demanded that her sister drown it. The other sister seems to have protested, but eventually she gave in to the new mother's imprecations and drowned the infant. The court determined that the sister who drowned the baby had not acted according to her own intentions but as her sister's helper. The interpretation implicit in Hartung's judgement, delivered on 19 February 1940, ran directly counter to other comparable cases adhering to the statutory precept that "S/he who holds the act in her or his hands is the perpetrator" ("Tatherrschaft hat, wer das Tatgeschehen in den Händen hält" BGHSt 8.393). For this precept the 1962 Stachinsky case would effectively reverse any precedent deemed to derive from the 1940 case. The judge in 1962 stated expressly that an accused person "is fundamentally also the perpetrator, [even] if under the influence and in the presence of another person in whose interests s/he perpetrates the deed.)

=== After 1945 ===
After the war Hartung returned to Homberg where he had grown up. Under plans already agreed between the leaders of the governments controlling the victorious armies, the western two thirds of Germany was divided into military occupation zones. Despite having been liberated from the Hitler government by US troops, Leipzig, hitherto home to the Supreme Court, was administered as part of the Soviet occupation zone the start of July 1945. Homberg was in the American occupation zone, to which millions of Germans had fled from eastern and central Germany during the closing weeks of the war. In August 1945 Fritz Hartung was arrested, presumably on account of his position as a high court judge during the Hitler years. At the end of May 1946 he was released, after an investigating tribunal had declared him "entlastet" (loosely, "exonerated"). During the final part of 1946 he accepted a teaching position at the University of Marburg where he remained till 1948. In 1948 it became known that he had actually at some point become a member of the Nazi Party and he was dismissed on orders from the "Liberation Ministry" in Wiesbaden. After this he supported himself, at least in part, as a writer and commentator. Despite a certain amount of ensuing confusion on the matter, a new panel subsequently confirmed the initial verdict as to his party membership.

In his own memoirs Hartung implicitly imputes the verdict that he had ever actually been a Nazi Party member to a misunderstanding, resulting from a propaganda article in the "Schiedsmannszeitung" ("Arbitration Newspaper") which carried his name due to an oversight. More recently the party membership lists, which initially seem to have been kept out of the public domain by the Soviet, American and British authorities, have been scrutinised by scholars, and it has been determined that in May 1937 Fritz Hartung did indeed join the Nazi Party, and served it at some stage it in a monitoring capacity as a "Blockleiter" (loosely, "locality supervisor" or sometimes, in common parlance, "snooper").

In February 1949 the authorities in Hessen (which after May 1949 would become a state in a newly reconfigured and relaunched German Federal Republic (West Germany) under U.S. military and political sponsorship) granted Fritz Hartung an advance on his pension entitlement of DM 275. With effect from November 1951, by which time he was 67, he received his regular public service pension entitlement as defined under Article 131 of the West German Basic Law code.

After 1949 Hartung increasingly came to the notice of lawyers and legal scholars in West Germany as a commentator on criminal law and criminal process. Notably, he clashed in the relevant learned journals with Eberhard Schmidt over the Göttingen Mensur Case which had the effect of regulating and apportioning criminal liability in certain cases arising from duels involving swordsmanship and certain student fraternities. The Göttingen Mensur Case at times slipped into the mainstream media over a couple of years between 1951 and 1953. Prof. Schmidt, having spent a number of years detained by the U.S. Army as a prisoner of war, was now a Professor of Criminology at the venerable University of Göttingen, from where he contended that recognition of a "physical confrontation" [or duel] as a sporting contest was necessarily dependant on an assessment to that effect by the German Sports Association or some other organisation with authority based on the appropriate expertise and reputation. Hartung took issue with this approach, arguing in support of a traditionalist "pre-republic" view.

In 1950 he took a lead in founding the Association of [West] German Arbitrators ("Bund Deutscher Schiedsmänner und Schiedsfrauen"). The Association appointed him to its honorary presidency in 1952.

Fritz Hartung was well past his seventy-fifth birthday when the West German government appointed him as an expert member of its Criminal Law Reform commission, of which he remained an active member for a number of years. The commission's work formed the basis for a number of major pieces of legislation between 1969 and 1973.
