= Reinhard Frank =

German professor of criminal law (1860–1934)

- Born: 16 August 1860; Reddighausen (Hatzfeld), Principality of Waldeck and Pyrmont
- Died: 21 March 1934 (aged 73); Munich, Bavaria, Germany
- Occupations: Law professor, writer
- Spouse: Antonie Richter (1866–1949)
- Children: 2

Academic background
- Education: Marburg University

Academic work
- Institutions: University of Giessen

Reinhard Frank (16 August 1860 - 21 March 1934) was a German lawyer-academic specialising in criminal law and international public law. He was a prolific author of legal text books and became an influential law reformer. In 1920 Frank was appointed Rector (chief administrative officer) of the Ludwig-Maximilians-Universität München.

== Life ==
=== Provenance and early years ===
Reinhard Karl Albrecht Otto Friedrich Georg Julius Ludwig Hermann Frank (after 1912 "...von Frank") was born at Reddighausen, (Hatzfeld) in the hill country between Cologne and Kassel. His father, Wilhelm Frank (1829-1889), described in at least one source simply as a hammer owner, was a small-scale industrialist with large ambitions for his son. His mother, born Minna Koch (1838–1863), was the daughter of a district judge (also named Reinhard) and came from a family with a long tradition of mid-level government service. His father was keen that Reinhard Frank should prosper in business, and with this in mind the boy was sent in 1871 to attend the "Realprogymnasium" (an advanced secondary school) in Biedenkopf. He then switched to the "Realgymnasium" in Groß-Umstadt before moving on again to a third school in the area, the prestigious Gymnasium Philippinum in Marburg. The objective was to maximise his chances of gaining a university place. The academic nature of the secondary schools he had attended meant that he had a received good grounding in Latin, and passing the Abitur (school finals) in 1879 cleared the way for the progression to university-level education.

=== Student years ===
He now enrolled at Marburg University to study Philology and Mathematics. Wilhelm Frank had firm ideas about the future direction of his son's career: Reinhard Frank's degree subject selection involved defying his father's wishes that everything he did should be directed toward taking charge, in due course, of the family business. He switched to Jurisprudence after just one term because, as he later explained, he was disappointed by the "lack of attention afforded the cultural and literary-historical contexts and all the other perspectives" involved in the study trajectory he had formerly selected. (Note: "...„mangelnde Berücksichtigung der kultur- und literarhistorischen Zusammenhänge und jeglicher ästhetischen Gesichtspunkte".) At some point around 1880 he took a year out from his university studies to volunteer for a one-year commission with the Marburg-based Hesse Infantry Battalion ("hessische Jägerbataillon") Nbr.11. Slightly unusually, on completion of his volunteer year, he did not sign up as a reserve officer. The record discloses that during his relatively brief time as a student at Marburg University he was, like many contemporaries, a member of the "Germania Marburg" student fraternity.

=== Graduation and beyond ===
During 1881/82 he studied for two terms at the Ludwig-Maximilians-Universität München where one of his lecturers was the eminent criminal jurist Joachim Wilhelm Franz Philipp von Holtzendorff, the man whose teaching chair Reinhard Frank would himself occupy after 1913. He then moved on to Kiel University where in 1883 he passed his Level 1 National Law Exams. After that he returned to Hesse where he undertook his Referendariat (legal apprenticeship) years in Battenberg and Marburg (along with briefer periods in Hanau and Göttingen). He seems to have never completed the Referendariat step to the point of sitting for his Level 2 National Law Exams. It was in Marburg that he came to know the distinguished reforming jurist Franz von Liszt who supervised both his doctorate (1886) and his habilitation (1887). Reinhard Frank would throughout his life hold von Liszt in the very highest regard. Frank's doctorate was received in return for a dissertation on the influence of Christian Wolff on philosophy of the natural criminal law propounded by Regnerus Engelhard. Frank expanded and republished the dissertation in 1887, now under the title "Die Wolffsche Strafrechtsphilosophie und ihr Verhältnis zur kriminalpolitischen Aufklärung des 18. Jahrhunderts" (loosely, "Wolff's philosophy of criminal law and its relationship with the eighteenth century enlightenment developments in criminal policy"). Already in 1881, he began to contribute regularly to the "Zeitschrift für die gesamte Strafrechtswissenschaft" (loosely, "Journal for all criminal law studies"), a newly launched specialist journal closely associated with Frank's mentor-supervisor, the (not infrequently controversial) Franz von Liszt. In his own contributions, both in the journal and elsewhere, Frank engaged in the then (as subsequently) endless academic arguments about classifying the varying degrees of criminal intent, taking a middle position between the views expounded by von Liszt and those set forth by Adolf Merkel.

In 1887, Reinhard Frank set up his own legal practice in Kassel, though it is not clear that he ever pursued this aspect of his career with much vigour.

=== Inheritance ===
Wilhelm Frank died in 1889, leaving his son and heir as the inheritor of the family hammer, which in a period of rapid industrial growth was evidently a lucrative asset. Reinhard Frank now took on the management of the business associated with it. It would be only in 1913 that the hammer operation was merged into the Adolfshütte iron works in Niederscheld which was part of "Frank’schen Eisenwerke", another company owned by the Frank family. Despite his business commitments, and still aged only 29, he was offered and accepted a full professorship in Criminal Law and Civil Process from the University of Giessen, along the valley to the south of Marburg. He took on the position in succession to Hans Bennecke in 1890. It was also in 1890 that he married his cousin, Antonie Richter (1866–1949), the daughter of a Rüsselheim Protestant minister. The couple's daughter, Luise, married the publisher Werner Siebeck (1891–1934) in 1917.

=== Professorial career ===
During the 1890s Frank rapidly built his reputation with a series of written works both on criminal law and on church law (which he had been able to study in some depth at the time when he was working for his post-doctoral degree a few years earlier). Despite his growing success in and beyond academic circles as an author on various aspects of jurisprudence, he made very little progress during his lifetime with his attempts to win wider recognition for the importance of Natural Law. According to one source in 1897 he was offered a seat representing Giessen in the imperial parliament (Reichstag), which he turned down. 1897 was the publication year for several of his books including "Das Strafgesetzbuch für das Deutsche Reich nebst dem Einführungsgesetze" a text book on the German penal code which became mainstream in the universities. Between its first publication in 1897 and Frank's death in 1934 eighteen editions were published. In 1899, he was offered and accepted the teaching chair in Criminal Law at the University of Halle-Wittenberg, newly vacated by his old mentor Franz von Liszt (who had moved on to the Friedrich Wilhelm University of Berlin). Between 1899 and 1902, Reinhard Frank held a full professorship at the University of Halle-Wittenberg.

=== Government work ===
He moved on again in 1902, this time to the University of Tübingen, where he held a full professorship in Criminal Law and Civil Process until 1913. During the first decade of the twentieth century, however, much of his more important work took place on the national stage rather than in the libraries and lecture halls by the banks of the Neckar. The Criminal Justice System had remained unreformed in the constituent territories of Germany since 1871, which a generation later was widely regarded as a problem. Between 1902 and 1914, Reinhard Frank was a leading contributor to correcting it. In 1902, the government recruited him to membership a new "Criminal Justice Committee" ("Strafrechtskomitee") (Note: Other members of the government's "Criminal Justice Committee" ("Strafrechtskomitee") established in 1902 were Hermann Seuffert (1836–1902), Karl von Birkmeyer (1847–1920), Fritz van Calker (1864–1957), Wilhelm Kahl (1849–1932), Karl von Lilienthal (1853–1927), Franz von Liszt (1851–1919) and Adolf Wach.) which began work on a "Comparative Presentation of German and Foreign Criminal Justice Systems" ("Vergleichenden Darstellung des deutschen und ausländischen Strafrechts"), a monumental study commissioned - and subsequently published in sixteen volumes - by the State Justice Department ("Reichsjustizamt"). Frank was most closely involved in preparing the lengthy special section on extortion and robbery. The more general body of the text concentrated on the trial process and completion. Unsatisfied with the preliminary draft published in 1909, Frank then participated in a new commission that worked between 1911 and 1913 on an enhanced version.

During this period, starting in 1904, he also authored and published a (not quite) annual compilation under the title "Pitaval der Gegenwart" ("Contemporary Pitivals"), described in a publisher's summary as "an almanack of interesting criminal cases". By 1914 eight volumes had appeared, the later ones having been co-produced with Heinrich Schmidt and the retired Hamburg police chief, Gustav Roscher.

=== Onwards and upwards ===
In 1913, Frank received and turned down the offer of a professorship from the Kaiser-Wilhelm University of Straßburg (as it was still known at that time). Sources differ over whether it was at some later date during 1913, or only in 1914, that he instead moved to Bavaria having accepted a professorship at the prestigious Ludwig-Maximilians-Universität München (LMU Munich) in Munich. There he enjoyed a career as an influential research scholar and teacher lasting nearly twenty years. He made the move to Munich at almost exactly the same time as his good friend and fellow professor of Criminal Law, Ernst von Beling, made the same career move from the University of Tübingen to the Ludwig-Maximilians-Universität München. Von Beling was both a friend and, evidently, an admirer, having dedicated his "Lehre vom Verbrechen" (Loosely, "Criminal Law primer") to Frank. Another close friend and admirer was the jurist Philipp Heck at the University of Tübingen who dedicated his Schuldrechtslehrbuch "... in friendship" to Frank.

=== War years ===
In 1920, Karl Engisch was a newly arrived student at the Ludwig-Maximilians-Universität München, and a regular listener at Frank's lectures on Criminal Law, when news came through that Reinhard Frank had turned down the opportunity to move to Leipzig University:

- "Ich erinnere mich des minutenlangen Beifalls, den das Auditorium dem zwar im Vortrage trockenen, aber doch als Lehrer und Mensch hochverehrten Manne für die Ablehnung des Leipziger Rufs spendete. Empfehlungen meines Vaters führten mich auch als Gast in das Haus Franks. Als Mittagsessen bot er den Studenten regelmäßig Kartoffelpfannkuchen, weil man die in den Gasthäusern nicht zu essen bekomme. Die Atmosphäre, die einen umfing, war von gewinnender Familiarität."
- "I remember the sustained applause in the lecture theater for a man whose lecturing was indeed dry, but who was highly revered as a teacher and as a human being, when he rejected the offer from Leipzig. My father's promptings led me to become a regular guest at Frank's house. At lunchtime, he regularly offered student potato pancakes, since these were not available in the pubs and cafés. The atmosphere surrounding you on these occasions was one of casual familiarity."

Karl Engisch

During the First World War, the focus of Frank's written output shifted towards topics in international and maritime law. Of particular political interest was his justification, published in 1915, of the violation of Belgian neutrality by the Imperial Army in August 1914. After the war reached its dénouement, Frank teamed up with Felix Rachfahl to deliver and publish an opinion repudiating as unconstitutional moves to extradite the exiled emperor from his sanctuary in the countryside outside Utrecht. Many years later, in 1929, Reinhard Frank was asked about his own political perspective during the turbulent post-war period that gave birth to the German republic. He recalled that he would have considered himself as democratic, liberal, and of the "political left" until the "revolution with its anti-patriotic undertones pushed him sharply towards the right".

=== German republic ===
In 1920, Frank turned down an offer to move to Leipzig University in order to take over from Adolf Wach who, having reached the age of 76, was retiring from the professorship he had held since 1875. Wach's speciality had always been Civil Process whereas Frank continued to display more interest in criminal law and international public law. At the time the offer came through from Leipzig University he may already have been aware that he was in line to be offered the rectorship at the Ludwig-Maximilians-Universität München which, later that year, he accepted, taking office on 27 November 1920. Although the administrative structures of the two venerable universities differed in many ways, one thing they had in common was that a university rector, at this point, were still appointed for a twelve-month term. Frank's successor as rector at the Ludwig-Maximilians-Universität München, in November 1921, was the Geographer and Geophysicist Erich von Drygalski.

Reinhard Frank died in Munich on 21 March 1934.
