= Zippelius =

Zippelius is a surname. Notable people with the surname include:

- Alexander Zippelius (1797–1828), Dutch horticulturalist and botanical collector
- Annette Zippelius (born 1949), German physicist
- Nicolas Zippelius (born 1987), German politician, member of the German Bundestag (MdP)
- Reinhold Zippelius (born 1928), German jurist
