= Franz Ritter von Liszt =

Franz Ritter von Liszt may refer to:

- Franz Liszt (1811–1886), Hungarian composer and pianist
- Franz von Liszt (1851–1919), German jurist, criminologist and international law reformer
