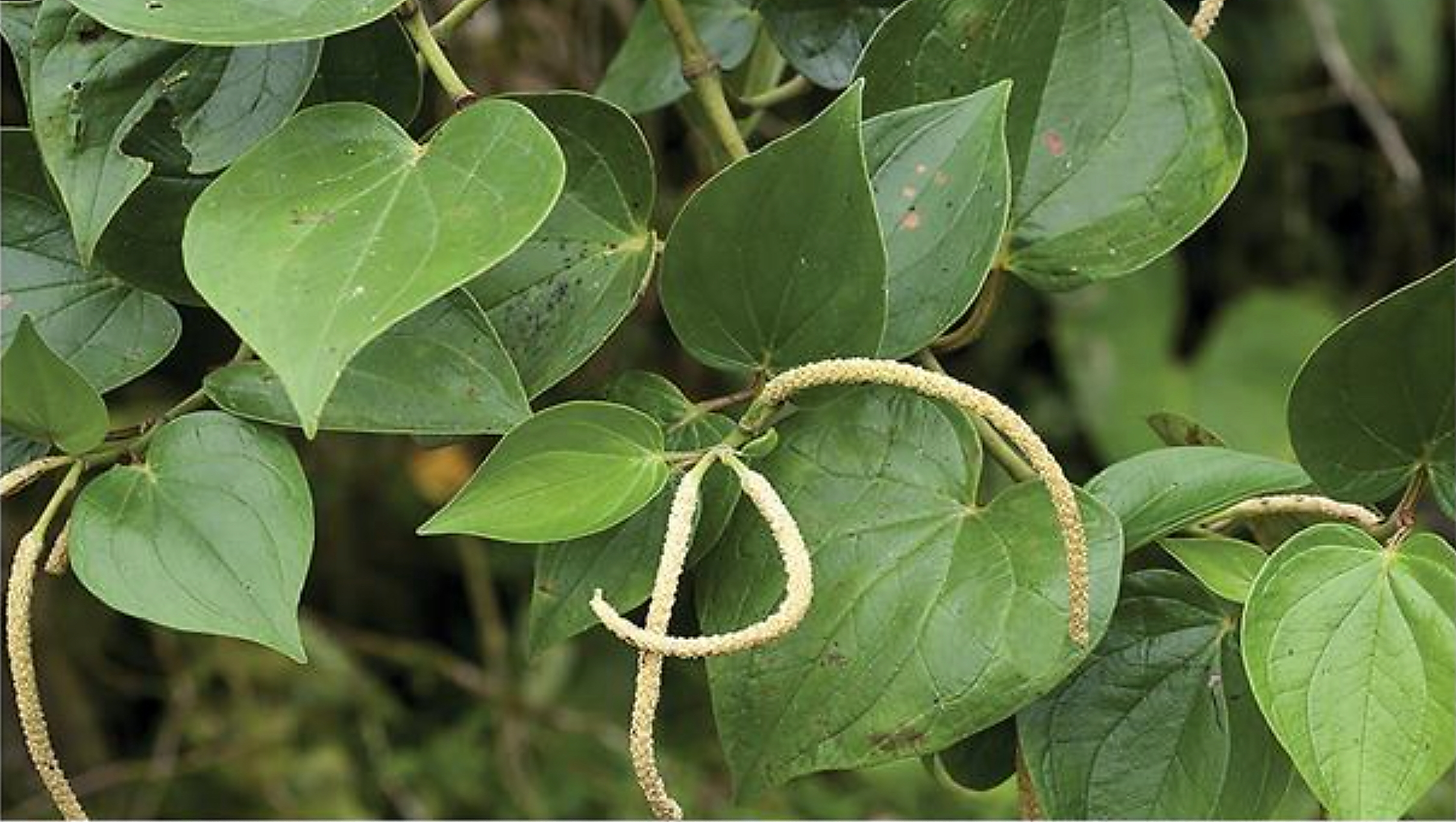
- A species of Manekia, M. betancurii

Scientific classification
- Kingdom: Plantae
- Clade: Tracheophytes
- Clade: Angiosperms
- Clade: Magnoliids
- Order: Piperales
- Family: Piperaceae
- Subfamily: Zippelioideae
- Genus: Manekia; Trel.

Species
- Manekia betancurii Silva-Sierra & Callejas; Manekia incurva (Sieber) T.Arias, Callejas & Bornst.; Manekia naranjoana (C.DC.) Callejas; Manekia obtusa (Miq.) T.Arias, Callejas & Bornst.; Manekia sydowii (Trel.) T.Arias, Callejas & Bornst.; Manekia urbani Trel.; Manekia venezuelana (Steyerm.) T.Arias, Callejas & Bornst.

Synonyms
- Sarcorhachis Trel.

= Manekia =

Genus of flowering plants in the pepper family Piperaceae

Manekia is a genus of flowering plants in the family Piperaceae.

It is distributed across disjunct areas in the southern Atlantics Forests of Brazil, the Guiana shield in Venezuela, the Andean regions of Colombia, Ecuador and Peru, the Caribbean coast of Nicaragua, Costa Rica and Panama, and the Greater and Lesser Antilles. It thrives in karst areas, and in humid, premontane or montane forests from sea level to 2,000 m (6,600 ft).

The name Manekia is a taxonomic anagram derived from the name of the genus Ekmania. The latter name is a taxonomic patronym honoring the Swedish botanist Erik Leonard Ekman.

== Description ==
Manekia members are characterized by scandent or lianescent habits and by short sympodial branches holding the spikes. Flowers possess four stamens, four-carpellate pistils with four or five stigmas. Berries are fully or partially immersed in the rachis.

When compared to other Piperaceae genera, the ecology of Manekia appears rather distinct, with plants invading forest litter, forming large mats of reptant stems, and eventually colonizing nearby phorophytes, reaching the canopy, and often forming large masses on the top before blooming.

== Phylogeny ==
Manekia is the sister group to Zippelia, and both genera are sister to a clade including Piper and Peperomia.
