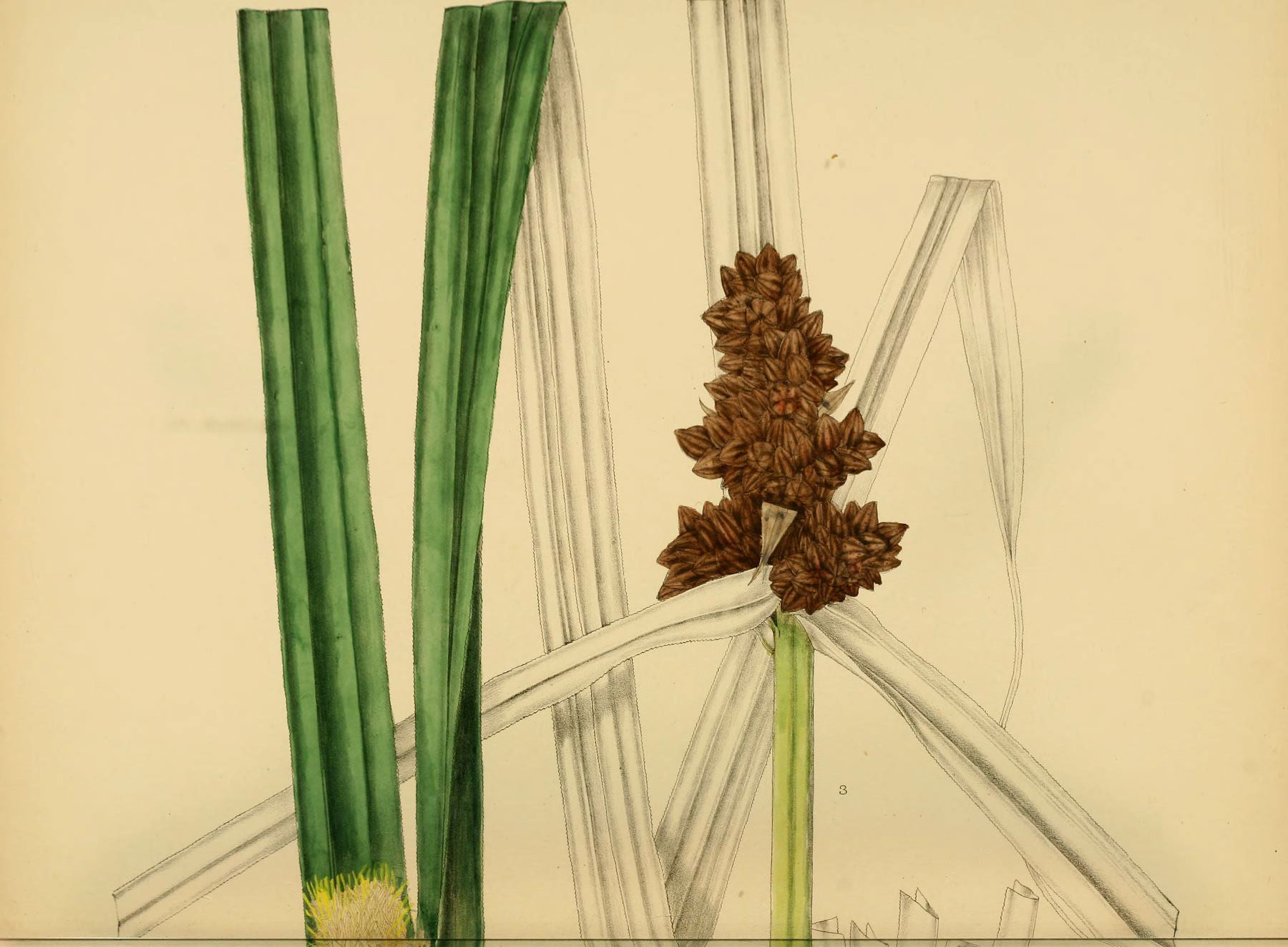
- Scirpodendron ghaeri

Scientific classification
- Kingdom: Plantae
- Clade: Tracheophytes
- Clade: Angiosperms
- Clade: Monocots
- Clade: Commelinids
- Order: Poales
- Family: Cyperaceae
- Genus: Scirpodendron; Zipp. ex Kurz

Synonyms
- Ptychocaryum R.Br. ex Kuntze

= Scirpodendron =

Genus of flowering plants

Scirpodendron is a genus of flowering plants belonging to the family Cyperaceae. Its native range is from India, through southeast Asia to the western Pacific.

== Species ==
As of October 2024, Plants of the World Online recognises two species, as follows:

- Scirpodendron bogneri S.S.Hooper (1997) – Peninsular Malaysia
- Scirpodendron ghaeri (Gaertn.) Merr. (1914) – India to western Pacific
