= Karl von Lilienthal =

German jurist (1853–1927)

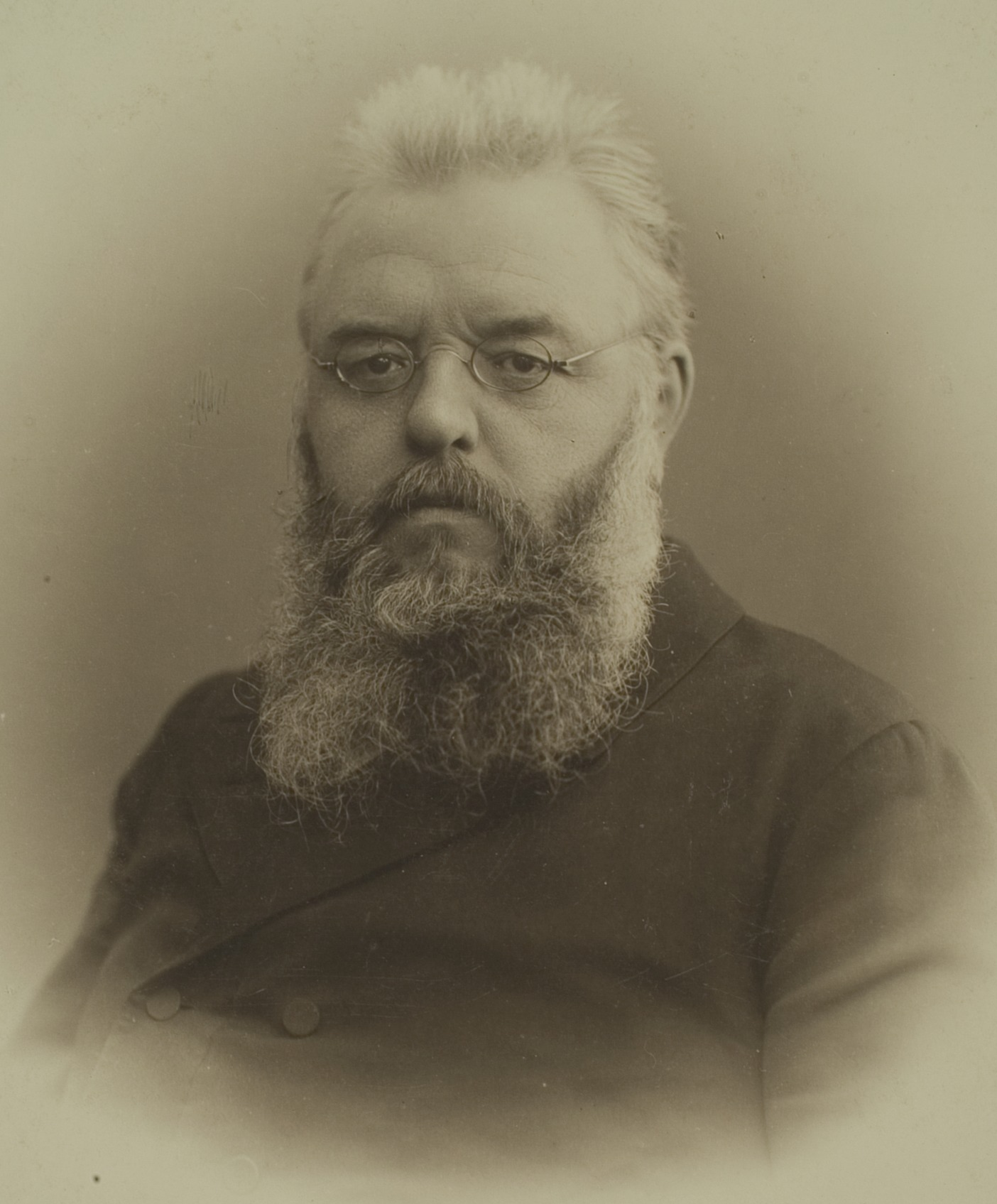
- 1905
- Born: Karl Ludwig Julius von Lilienthal; 31 August 1853; Elberfeld (Wuppertal), Rhine Province, Prussia, German confederation
- Died: 8 November 1927 (aged 74); Heidelberg, Baden, Germany
- Education: Berlin; Heidelberg
- Occupations: Jurist; Professor of Criminal Law and Process; Part-time assistant judge
- Spouse: Anna Boehle (1857–1931)
- Children: Franz von Lilienthal (1881–1932) and 2 daughters
- Parents: Ludwig von Lilienthal (1828–1893) (father); Henriette Seyd (1832–1886) (mother)

Karl von Lilienthal (31 August 1853 - 8 November 1927) was a German scholar of Jurisprudence who became a university professor of criminal law. After working briefly as an Assessor (legal assistant) at the Wuppertal District Court he taught successively at the universities of Halle, Zürich, Marburg and then, between 1896 and 1924, Heidelberg, where he also served several terms as Dean of the Law Faculty and, for some years between 1902 and 1919, engaged in a parallel part time career in town as an assistant district judge.

Beyond the academic world, in 1902 von Lilienthal was one of eight eminent jurists who accepted invitations to join the government's new "Criminal Justice Committee" ("Strafrechtskomitee"), which went on to recommend a series of important reforms to the criminal law. For the rest of his life he was an influential commentator on the selective implementation. over several decades of the commission recommendations. An eye catching intervention came, towards the end of his life, in 1925 when he submitted a criticism of the newly drafted penal code in which he called for the paragraphs purporting to restrict abortion rights to be removed and for the criminalisation of homosexual acts to be ended.

== Life and works ==
=== Provenance and early years ===
Karl Ludwig Julius von Lilienthal was born into a Protestant family at Elberfeld, a small a small commercial and manufacturing town near Wuppertal, into which it has subsequently been subsumed. Ludwig von Lilienthal (1828–1893), Karl's father, was a wealthy businessman and shop owner, prominent in the area as a patron of the arts. Further back, on his father's side the family traced their roots back to Copenhagen where his grandfather, Johannes von Lilienthal, had been a senior court and government official. As a young apprentice working at the department store of Carl Seyd (1792–1857), Ludwig von Lilienthal had come to know, and then married, his boss's daughter, Karl's mother, born Henriette Seyd (1832–1886). Between 1865 and 1868 Karl von Lilienthal attended the local Gymnasium (secondary school) in Elberfeld. He was still only 15 when he completed the school curriculum and passed the "Abitur" (school final exam), which opened the way to university level education.

=== Student and apprentice years ===
In 1868 he enrolled at the University of Berlin to study Jurisprudence. He also took advantage of the opportunities offered to attend classes in Philosophy, History and Psychiatry. He was still in Berlin in June 1872, which was when he passed his level I law exams, after which he enrolled as a "Referendar" (a form of graduate legal apprentice) in the Elberfeld court sub-district. On 19 February 1873 he accepted a doctorate in jurisprudence from the University of Heidelberg. Unusually, he received his doctorate without being required to submit a doctoral dissertation. After completing his "Referendariat" (apprenticeship he continued to work, now as an Assessor (legal assistant) at the office of the local public prosecutor at the district court in Elberfeld till 9 July 1877. On 30 August he was released from the government justice service at his own request.

Lilienthal received his habilitation (higher postgraduate degree) from the University of Halle on 7 August 1879 in return for a "trial lecture" and a dissertation on criminal law and criminal process. The work, entitled "Beiträge zur Lehre von den Kollektivdelikten" ("Contributions to the teaching of collective offences"), was supervised by Prof. Adolf Dochow (1844–1881). His trial lecture was on the topic of "Usury legislation in Prussia". At Dochow's instigation he now went on to contribute numerous articles to von Holtzendorff's "Law Lexikon" which had been launched in 1870 and continued to expand every time there was a new edition.

=== Zürich and Marburg ===
In 1882 Karl von Lilienthal accepted a full professorship in Criminal Law (also incorporating, according to one source, Criminal Process and Civil Process) at the University of Zürich, taking up his appointment on 1 October and remaining in the post for seven years. During October/November 1889 he then moved to the University of Marburg as an ordinary (full) professor in Criminal Law, Criminal Process and Civil Process, in succession to Franz von Liszt. During the decades that followed von Liszr became a friend and something of an academic mentor for von Lilienthal. In 1894 von Lilienthal was appointed Dean of the Law Faculty at Marburg.

=== Heidelberg ===
Following the death of Prof. Rudolf Heinze during the early summer of 1896, in October 1896 Karl von Lilienthal was sworn in to a full professorship in Criminal Law, Criminal Process and Church Law at the University of Heidelberg on 14 October. Lilienthal received and accepted the invitation to return to the university that had awarded him his doctorate in law "with great joy": his lengthy incumbency at Heidelberg marked the highpoint of his career. Following the sudden death of his former tutor Adolf Dochow in 1881, he took over as co-producer of the newly launched Zeitschrift für die gesamte Strafrechtswissenschaft, also becoming a long-standing contributing editor to this specialist journal on criminal law. His published contributions considerably raised his profile among academic colleagues during the 1880s. Both his critical commentaries and his essays on criminal law display a consistent reluctance to stoke the sometimes polemical polarisation to which several high-profile contemporaries were attracted. He preferred to focus on practical proposals and workable solutions. This reflected both his consensual temperament and the court-room experience he gained through his work as apart-time assistant judge at the local court between 1902 and 1919. His court room experience was also reflected in the lectures he gave on Civil Process, a field on which he had taught during his time at Marburg, but which was never officially included in his professorial remit at Heidelberg. At Heidelberg von Lilienthal served several stints as dean of the law faculty, and during 1912/13 he served as university prorector.

Karl von Lilienthal retired from his professorship on 1 October 1919 and was appointed by the university to an honorary ordinary professorship, from which he finally retired in 1924. A number of those whom he taught at Heidelberg subsequently achieved eminence on their own account as legal scholars, including Eduard Kohlrausch, Gustav Radbruch and Wolfgang Mittermaier. Von Lilienthal supervised all three of these men, as postgraduate students, for their Habilitation degrees.

Karl von Lilienthal died "after a short illness" at Heidelberg on 8 November 1927. His ashes were buried a few days later at the Bergfriedhof ("hills cemetery") on the eastern edge of the city.

== Legacy ==
Karl von Lilienthal has been described as "a leading representative of the modernising scholars of criminal law whose ideas incorporated the [rapidly evolving] sociological precepts of the late nineteenth century". (Note: "...einer der profiliertesten Vertreter der modernen, soziologischen Richtung in der Strafrechtswissenschaft des ausgehenden 19. Jahrhunderts") Professorial friends and colleagues held him in very high regard. It is true that he never published any great ground breaking volumes, but his many articles in specialist journals, monographs, and other contributions to compendia and lexicons were respected and, in many cases, influential. Lilienthal was a consistent proponent for the opening up of criminal law studies to other disciplines, including not just Criminology, but also Psychology and Sociology. It is hard to single out from his legacy any particular research focus. He commented thoughtfully on a wide range of policy issues arising across the palette of criminal law and criminal process. He produced commentaries on individual judgements, scholarly contributions and critiques of new legislation during a period charactered by a large amount of necessary consolidation and increased legal consistency which had emerged as critical "unfinished business" following unification. Nearly a century later there is a curiously contemporary resonance in his critical response in 1925 to a recent heavily revised draft legal code for Germany. He demanded that paragraphs seeking to restrict women's abortion rights should be removed and the criminalisation of homosexual acts ended. Both through his writings and, less directly, through the subsequent contributions of his students, Karl von Lilienthal made a decisive contribution to the design and implementation reforms in Criminal Procedure and the German penal code.
