= Verhuellia hydrocotylifolia =

Scientific classification
- Kingdom: Plantae
- Clade: Tracheophytes
- Clade: Angiosperms
- Clade: Magnoliids
- Order: Piperales
- Family: Piperaceae
- Genus: Verhuellia
- Species: V. hydrocotylifolia

Binomial name
- Verhuellia hydrocotylifolia (Griseb.) C.D.Adams

Synonyms
- Mildea hydrocotylifolia Griseb. (1866); Verhuellia cordifolia C.DC. (1869)

Species of flowering plant

Verhuellia hydrocotylifolia is a species of flowering plant in the family Piperaceae. The genus Verhuellia is closely related to the larger and more well-known genus Piper.

== Distribution ==
The species is native to Cuba.
