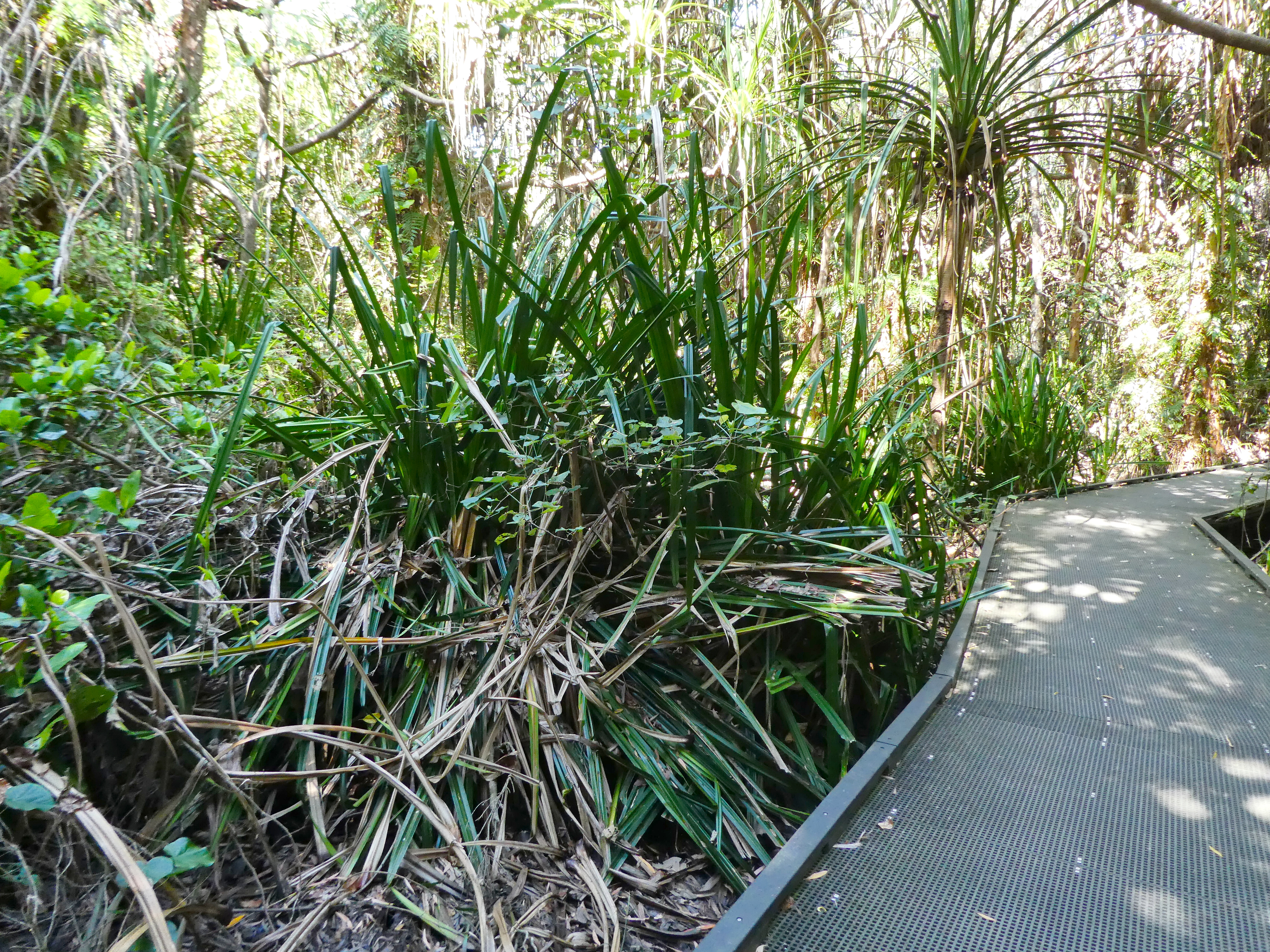
- Growing in palm swamp in Cairns, Queensland

Conservation status
- Least Concern (NCA)

Scientific classification
- Kingdom: Plantae
- Clade: Tracheophytes
- Clade: Angiosperms
- Clade: Monocots
- Clade: Commelinids
- Order: Poales
- Family: Cyperaceae
- Genus: Scirpodendron
- Species: S. ghaeri

Binomial name
- Scirpodendron ghaeri (Gaertn.) Merr.

Synonyms
- Ptychocaryum ghaeri (Gaertn.) H.Pfeiff.; Chionanthus ghaeri Gaertn.; Hypolytrum costatum Thwaites; Scirpodendron costatum Kurz; Scirpodendron pandaniforme Zipp. ex Kurz; Scirpodendron sulcatum Miq.; Scleria macrocarpa Wall.

= Scirpodendron ghaeri =

Species of flowering plant

Scirpodendron ghaeri is a plant in the family Cyperaceae native to areas from India through southeast Asia to the western Pacific. It is a tall sedge with a woody rhizome producing 3 m (9.8 ft) long leaves in dense clumps; the leaves have sharp edges and the plant forms impenetrable barriers. It was first described as Chionanthus ghaeri by Joseph Gaertner in 1788, and transferred to the genus Scirpodendron by Elmer Drew Merrill in 1914. It usually grows in coastal swamp forest, but may be found in rainforest and gallery forest

== Conservation ==
This species has been assessed as least concern under the Queensland Government's Nature Conservation Act. As of 20 October 2024, it has not been assessed by the International Union for Conservation of Nature (IUCN).
