= Reinhold Zippelius =

German jurist and law scholar (born 1928)

Reinhold Zippelius (born 19 May 1928) is a German jurist and law scholar. Now retired, he was formerly the professor of the Philosophy of law and Public law at the University of Erlangen–Nuremberg.

== Life and career ==
Reinhold Walter Zippelius was born in Ansbach (west of Nuremberg), the son of Hans Zippelius and Marie (Stoessel) Zippelius. He embarked on his study of jurisprudence in 1947 at the University of Würzburg and then at the University of Erlangen–Nuremberg. In 1949, he switched to the Ludwig-Maximilians-Universität München where between 1949 and 1961 he was supported by a scholarship-bursary. He received his doctorate in 1953. His habilitation (higher academic qualification), also from the Ludwig-Maximilians-Universität München, and supervised by Karl Engisch, would follow in 1961.

After passing his public law exams (1956 and 1963) Zippelius worked in government service in Bavaria, in the end promoted to the level of Oberregierungsrat (senior government legal advisor) at the Interior Ministry. His habilitation in 1961 opened the way for an academic career, and in 1963, he accepted a teaching chair at Erlangen that covered a range of law related disciplines including Philosophy of law, Public law, Administrative/Civil Law and Church law. Despite attempts by the Ludwig-Maximilians-Universität München and other university level institutions outside Bavaria to lure him away, he remained at the University of Erlangen–Nuremberg for more than fifty years. Reinhold Zippelius retired from his professorship at the University of Erlangen-Nuremberg in 1995.

Zippelius is a full member of the Mainz-based Academy of Sciences and Literature ("Akademie der Wissenschaften und der Literatur"). In 2002 The Faculty of Scientific Theory and History at Athens University awarded him an honorary doctorate ("doctor honoris causa").

== Focus ==
His academic research is centred on constitutional law, theory of the state, along with legal philosophy and method.

The "critical rationalism" provides the theoretical base for Zippelius' concept of law.

According to Zippelius, law does not consist of "abstract" norms which are loosened from life, but it is "law in action", which is procreated by human action and thereby transformed into the reality of the contemporary culture.

In terms of legal theory, his themes include solving legal problems with the assistance of key concepts, comparison of cases and the question of what counts as "right", especially as regards the validity of unfair laws.

In terms of theory of the state, his themes include the legitimization and cultivation of democracy, especially regarding the rule of law, and the oligarchic components of pluralistic democracy, furthermore the federalism (the limitation of authorities, the functioning and the democratic ambiguity of federalism) and the problems of the bureaucracy.

== See also ==
James R. Maxeiner (translated Reinhard Zippelius (son of Reinhold)) Thinking like a lawyer abroad: putting justice into legal reasoning, Washington University Global Studies Law Review Vol 11/1, January 2012
