= Verhuellia =

Scientific classification
- Kingdom: Plantae
- Clade: Tracheophytes
- Clade: Angiosperms
- Clade: Magnoliids
- Order: Piperales
- Family: Piperaceae
- Genus: Verhuellia; Miq.

Synonyms
- Mildea Griseb.

Genus of flowering plants

Verhuellia is a genus of flowering plants belonging to the family Piperaceae. Verhuellia is a sister genus to all other Piperaceae, but has its own subfamily of Verhuellioideae.

It is native to Cuba and Hispaniola (the Dominican Republic and Haiti).

== Known species ==
As accepted by Kew:

- Verhuellia hydrocotylifolia (Griseb.) C.DC. ex C.Wright
- Verhuellia lunaria (Ham.) C.DC.
- Verhuellia pellucida F.Schmitz

The genus name of Verhuellia is in honour of Quirijn Maurits Rudolph Ver Huell (1787–1860), a Dutch rear admiral, illustrator and entomologist. It was first described and published in Syst. Piperac. on page 47 in 1843.
