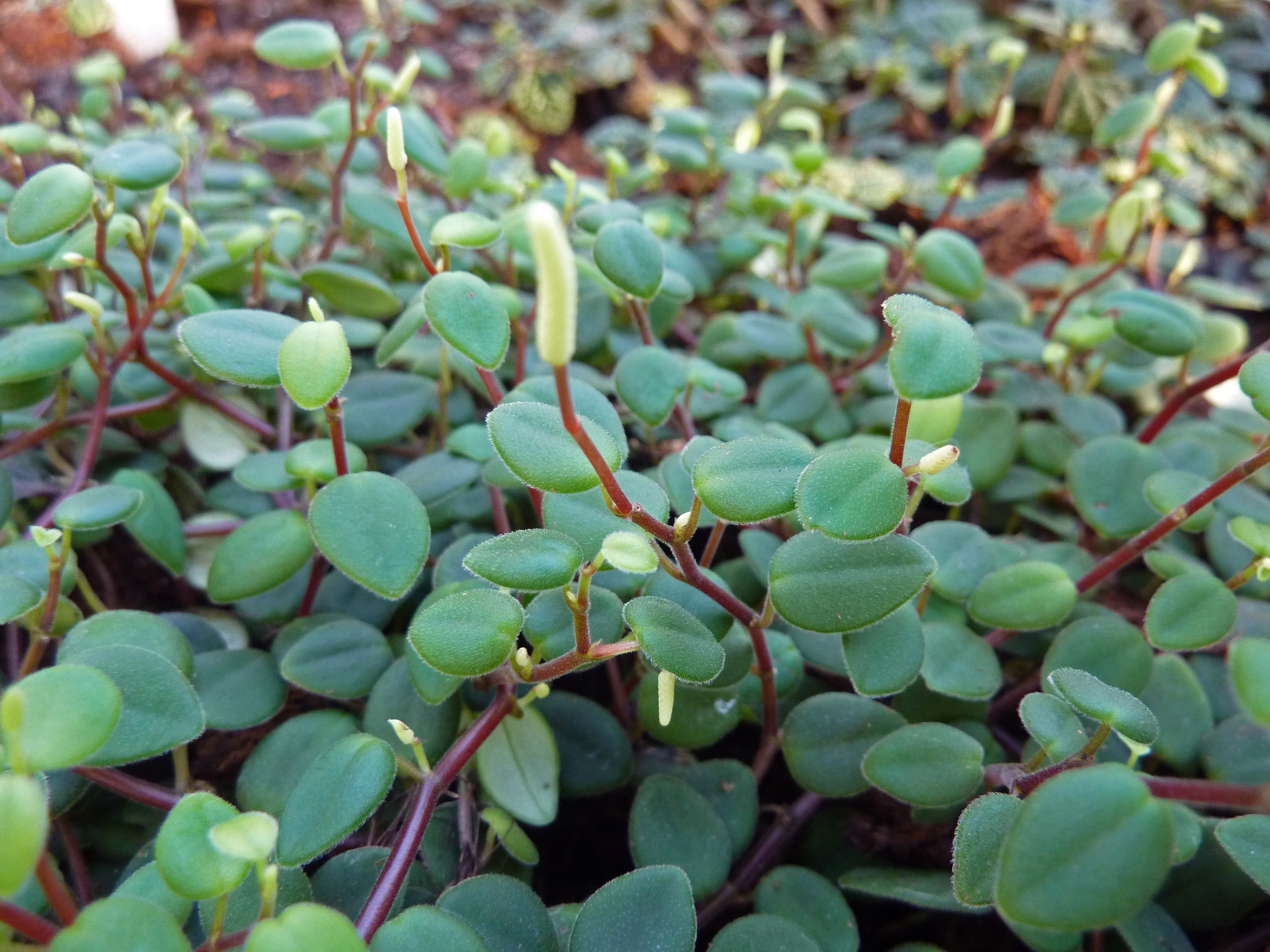

Scientific classification
- Kingdom: Plantae
- Clade: Tracheophytes
- Clade: Angiosperms
- Clade: Magnoliids
- Order: Piperales
- Family: Piperaceae
- Genus: Peperomia
- Species: P. perciliata

Binomial name
- Peperomia perciliata Yunck.

= Peperomia perciliata =

Species of plant

Peperomia perciliata is a species of plant in the family Piperaceae. It is native to Colombia.
