= Alfred Hoche =

German psychiatrist (1865–1943)

Alfred Erich Hoche
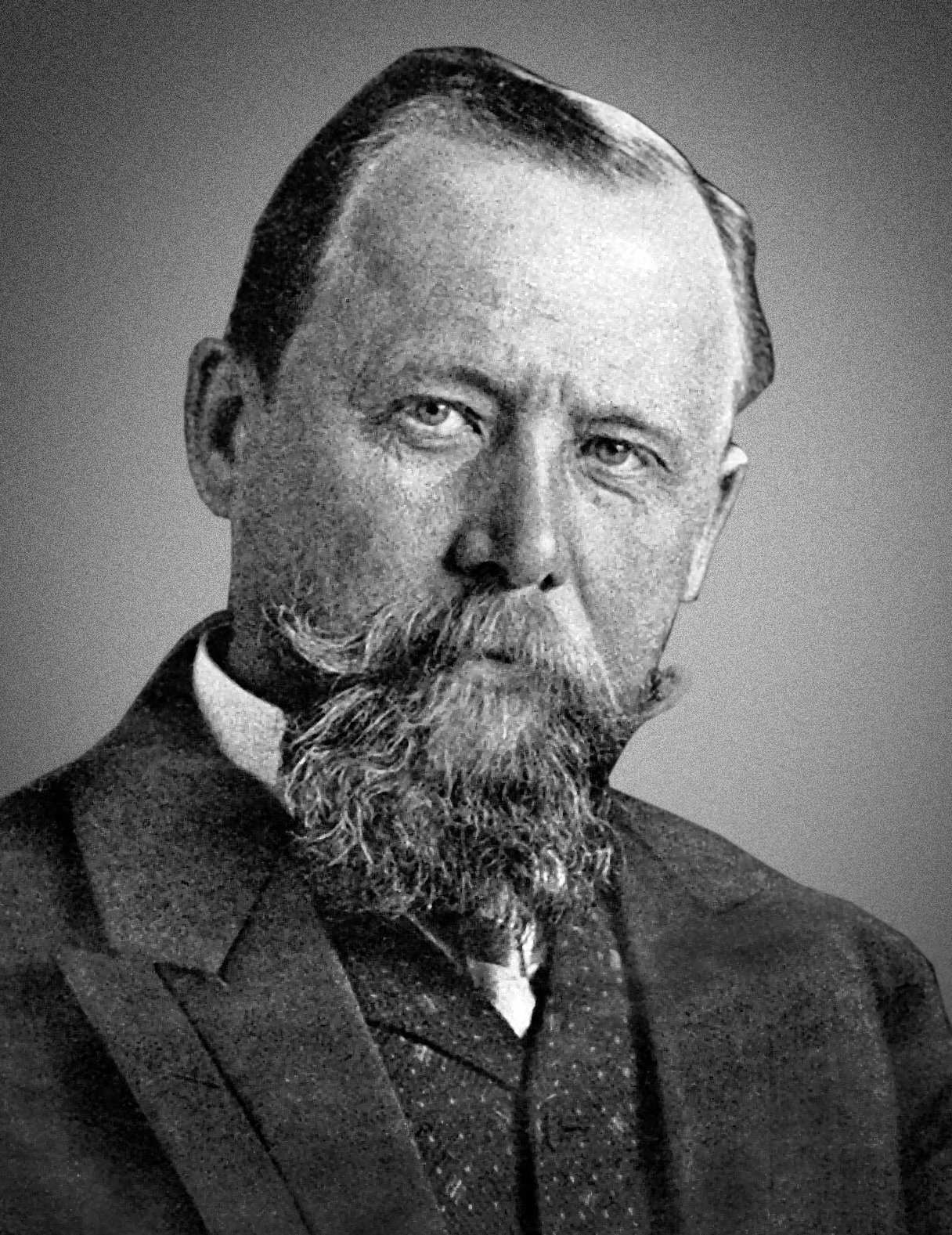
- Alfred Erich Hoche sometime before 1923
- Born: 1 August 1865; Wildenhain, Province of Saxony, Kingdom of Prussia
- Died: 16 May 1943 (aged 77); Baden-Baden
- Occupation: Psychiatrist
- Known for: Eugenics and euthanasia

Alfred Erich Hoche (German pronunciation: [ˈalfʁeːt ˈʔeːʁɪç ˈhɔxə]; 1 August 1865 – 16 May 1943) was a German psychiatrist known for his writings about eugenics and euthanasia and his later recanting thereof.

== Life ==
Hoche studied in Berlin and Heidelberg and became a psychiatrist in 1890. He moved to Strasbourg in 1891. From 1902 he was a professor in Freiburg im Breisgau and was the director of the psychiatric clinic there. He was a major opponent of the psychoanalysis theories of Sigmund Freud. Hoche's body of work on the classification system of mental illness had a great influence. He also published poetry under the pseudonym Alfred Erich.

According to Michael Burleigh's book Death and Deliverance, he was married to a Jewish woman and left his post in Freiburg after National Socialists came to power. He was privately critical of the Nazis' euthanasia program after it claimed one of his relatives, despite its rationale being based on his own ideas. After losing his only son in 1915 he became increasingly taciturn and depressed and his death in 1943 was probably due to suicide.

== Publications and Ideas ==
=== Die Freigabe der Vernichtung Lebensunwerten Lebens (Allowing the Destruction of Life Unworthy of Life) ===
In Binding and Hoche's book, Hoche calls for the killing of the mentally ill and especially considers those who have been what he calls "mentally or intellectually dead" since birth or early childhood.

Hoche begins his relatively short text by reminding readers that in the society of the day (1920s Germany) deaths caused by doctors were, in some cases at least, actually taken for granted. He mentions the risk taken by patients during operations and the killing of a child during birth to save the life of a mother. Hoche stresses that none of these killings are actually legal, and although a doctor cannot always be sure of escaping prosecution, they are examples of where non-legal killings are accepted by the society of the day.

Hoche talks about euthanasia as proposed by Binding, arguing that if killing a person would lead to other lives being saved, it would be justifiable (Consequentialism). Hoche believed that the killing of patients which he claimed had neither value for society, nor for themselves, should be allowed.

Hoche was unable to establish an absolute rule for the first group (incurable illness) as they had not all "lost their objective and subjective value of life" and so concentrated on the second group, which he presumed had already done so. It is clear that this group would be substantially larger than the first.

Again Hoche saw an important difference in the people belonging to this group and he split it accordingly. He divided the group into people that have entered this condition later in life after "being mentally normal or at least average for a period of their life" (Dementia Paralytica/ Dementia Praecox) and in those that had either been born in the condition or where this had occurred in early childhood. Hoche argued that anyone born with this condition could never have developed any emotional relationship to their environment or family, whereas a person who had lived normally for most of their life would have had this possibility. This would enable them to display thankfulness or reverence and to connect strong memories to these feelings. This was important to take into account when deciding on a killing, yet it was not to be equated with the killing of another human being.

Hoche argued that the "mentally dead" are easily identified, they have no clear imagination, no feelings, wishes or determination. They have no possibility to develop a Weltbild (worldview), or a relationship to their environment. Most importantly, they lack a self-consciousness or even the possibility to become conscious of their own existence. They have no subjective claim to life, as their feelings are just simple elemental ones such as those found in the lower animals.

Hoche criticises the "modern endeavour" that has blocked "our German duty", which wants to "keep the weakest of all alive" and "has blocked attempts at preventing the mentally dead at least from procreating" and he speaks of "elements of less value", "weaklings" or "ballast existences".

Hoche then begins to argue for the killing of the disabled for purely financial reasons. Calculating the "financial and moral burden" on a person's environment, hospital and on the state, Hoche claimed that those who were "completely mentally dead" at the same time weighed heavily on "our national burden".

Binding and Hoche's book, along with those by Alfred Ploetz, Rupp and Jost, directly influenced the Nazi T-4 Euthanasia Program of the 1930s. Hoche postulated "that perhaps one day we will come to the conclusion that the disposal of the mentally dead is not criminally nor morally wrong, but a useful act".

Hoche argued that the state can be seen "as an organism, as a human body which—as every doctor knows—in the interests of the survival of the whole, gives up or discards parts which have become valueless or damaging". In the case of the mentally ill these were those who were valueless and were to be discarded.

Hoche believed his ideas would be widely accepted only after "a change in consciousness, a realisation of the unimportance of a single person's existence compared to that of the entirety... the absolute duty of bringing together all available energy and the feeling of belonging to a greater undertaking". Arguably this was to take place much faster than even Hoche had expected; a little more than a decade later, his ideas became part of German (Nazi) law.

=== Jahresringe: Innenansicht eines Menschenlebens (Tree-rings: Insight into a Human Life) ===
In his comments to the second edition of Hoche's Jahresringe, Tilde Marchionini-Soetbeer, the book's editor, claimed that "out of love to his dead friend of 20 years", "I have taken it upon myself, with the help of understanding critics, to edit or even remove parts of the text which ... (Hoche) would have rejected, are outdated or unjust". These included Hoche's ideas "grouped around the euthanasia problem". Marchionini claimed that by 1950, Hoche would have rejected the idea, "had he experienced the inhumanities which doctors are capable of, if they are given the right to kill".

In his book, Hoche spoke about the "centuries in Germany, in which it was impossible to travel through the country, without seeing a sinner hanging from a gallows; years ago, they had stronger nerves than us and reached to the gallows more quickly. They were times in which a well trained judge was able to undertake interrogations using torture and could face the hanged and their smell as they decayed". (P195)

Hoche was interested in anatomy and took part in autopsies. He preferred people who had faced the guillotine: "because of the importance of the freshest possible material for investigation". Hoche detailed how he had taken part in at least one illegal experiment on such a person. Smuggling himself into an autopsy as an assistant to investigate the effects of electricity on the human central nervous system, Hoche connected a hidden motor to the body to see if he could make it move.

Eventually, after the state prosecution gave him special permission, Hoche was able to experiment on bodies within two minutes of their execution by guillotine. (P197)

== Hoche's relevance today ==
Advocates of euthanasia have been accused of being influenced by Hoche, whether knowingly or not. In particular, several authors have drawn similarities between the arguments of Hoche and those of Australian philosopher Peter Singer.

== Publications ==
- Die Freigabe der Vernichtung lebensunwerten Lebens. Ihr Maß und ihre Form, Binding, K. Hoche, A. 1920, 1922 Felix Meiner Verlag, Leipzig
- Jahresringe. Innenansicht eines Menschenlebens, Hoche A, 1933
- Aus der Werkstatt, Hoche A, 1935
- Jahresringe. Innenansicht eines Menschenlebens, Hoche A, Lehmans Verlag, München, 1950 Hrsg. Tilde Marchionini-Soetbeer

== See also ==
- Alfred Ploetz
- Das Recht auf den Tod, Elisabeth Gerdts-Rupp
- Das Recht auf den Tod, Adolf Jost
