= Alexander Zippelius =

Dutch horticulturalist and botanical collector

Alexander Zippelius (1797, Würzburg – 31 December 1828, Kupang) was a Dutch horticulturalist and botanical collector in the East Indies.

From 1823 he worked as an assistant curator in the botanical gardens at Buitenzorg, and in 1827 he joined the Natuurkundige Commissie (Commission for Natural Sciences). He collected plants in the Moluccas, southwestern New Guinea and Timor. He died on Timor in 1828.

The botanical genus Zippelia (family Piperaceae) was named in his honor by Carl Ludwig Blume. Also, he is associated with plants having the specific names of zippeliana, zippelii, and zippelianum.
