= Zippelia =

Scientific classification
- Kingdom: Plantae
- Clade: Tracheophytes
- Clade: Angiosperms
- Clade: Magnoliids
- Order: Piperales
- Family: Piperaceae
- Genus: Zippelia; Blume
- Species: Z. begoniifolia

Binomial name
- Zippelia begoniifolia Blume

Genus of flowering plants in the pepper family Piperaceae

Zippelia begoniifolia is the only species of the monotypic genus Zippelia, a genus of plants in the Piperaceae, the same botanical family as that of black pepper. The species has also been spelled as Z. begoniaefolia. It is an erect, ascending, perennial herb with leaves of 6 to 12.5 cm (2.4 to 4.9 in) in length. It occurs in Borneo, Cambodia, southern-central and southeast mainland China as well as Hainan, Java, Laos, Peninsular Malaysia, the Philippines, Sumatra, Thailand and Vietnam.

The generic epithet commemorates Alexander Zippelius. Zippelius was a horticulturist and early collector of plants in Java and other islands of the region.

The genus name Zippelia has a confused taxonomic history, also having been used to place the parasitic plants now classified in the genus Rhizanthes by Ludwig Reichenbach.
