= James Goldschmidt =

German jurist (1874–1940)

James P. Goldschmidt
- Born: 17 December 1874; Berlin, Germany
- Died: June 28, 1940 (aged 65); Montevideo, Uruguay
- Occupation: Jurist
- Spouse: Margarete Lange
- Children: Werner Goldschmidt
- Parent(s): Robert Goldschmidt and Emily Bressler

James Paul Goldschmidt (17 December 1874 – 28 June 1940) was a German jurist who made important contributions to German criminal law and criminal procedure law. He studied legal science in Heidelberg and Berlin. Of Ashkenazi Jewish descent, Goldschmidt was a professor at the University of Berlin from 1919 until his retirement in 1934 due to racial policy of Nazi Germany. In 1938 he eventually emigrated to the United Kingdom, and later Uruguay, where he died in 1940.

His younger brother Hans Walter Goldschmidt (1881–1940), also a jurist, died in 1940 on board of the SS Arandora Star.
