= Karl Engisch =

German jurist

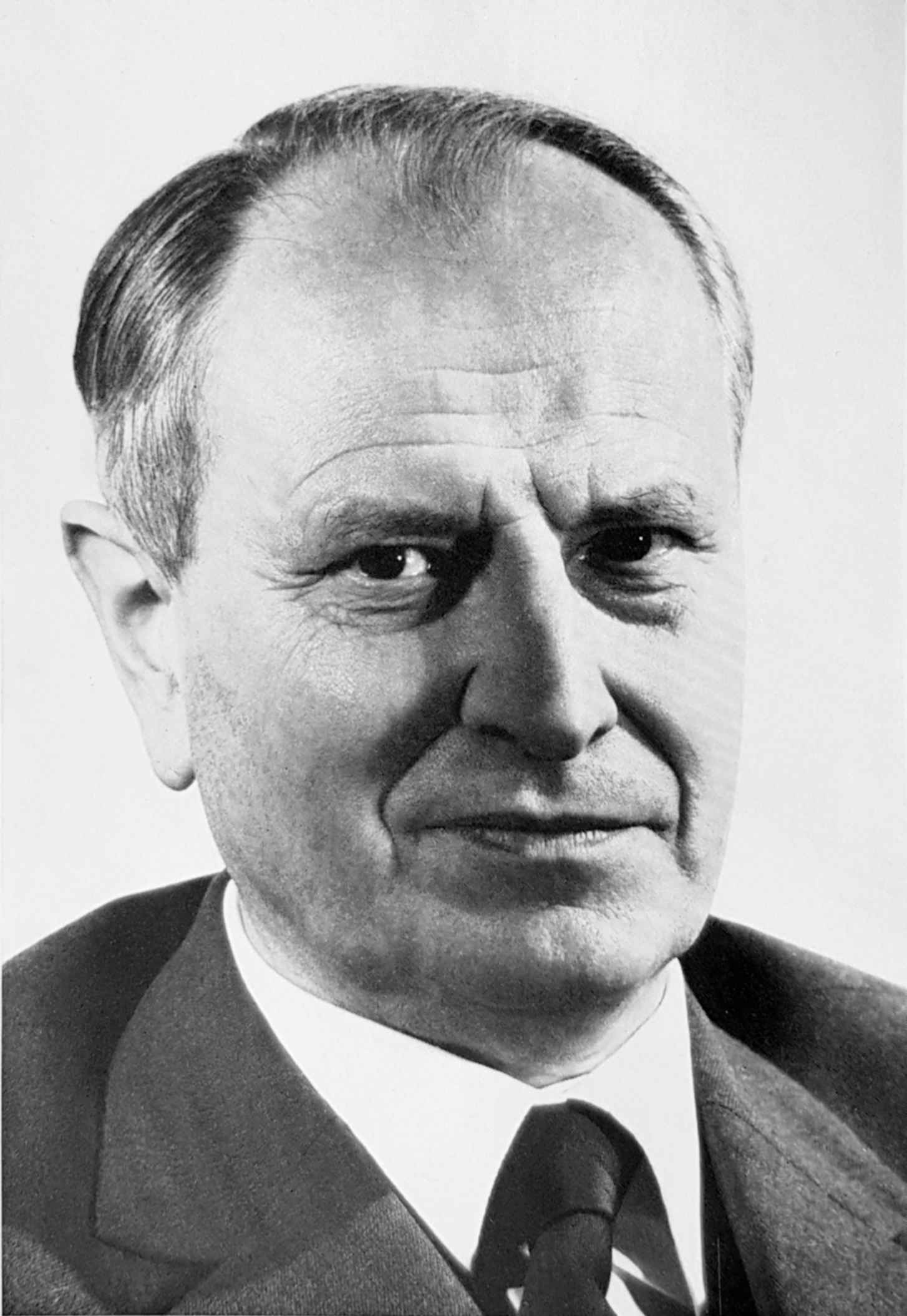
- Portrait 1968
- Born: 15 March 1899; Gießen, Hesse, Germany
- Died: 11 September 1990 (aged 91); Nieder-Wiesen (Alzey-Worms), Rhineland-Palatinate, Germany
- Education: University of Giessen; Ludwig-Maximilians-Universität München; Heidelberg University
- Occupations: Lawyer; Jurist; Legal philosopher
- Political party: NSDAP
- Spouse: Thekla Schudt (1900–1973)
- Children: Irmgard; Renate
- Parent(s): Friedrich Engisch (1871–1943); Dora Urich (1876–1928)

Karl Engisch (15 March 1899 – 11 September 1990) was a German jurist and a Philosopher of Law. He was described by Hans Joachim Hirsch as one of the "outstanding theorists of criminal justice of the [twentieth] century" ("herausragenden Strafrechtstheoretiker des vergangenen Jahrhunderts").

== Life ==
Karl Engisch was born in 1899 in Gießen, a mid-sized university town north of Frankfurt. Friedrich Engisch (1871–1943), his father was a lawyer. He passed his Abitur (school final exams) which would normally have opened the way to a university education, but these were the war years, and the eighteen-year-old was now sent to take part in the fighting. He was wounded twice.

After the war, he studied law at the University of Giessen and the Ludwig-Maximilians-Universität München between 1918 and 1921. His teachers included Wolfgang Mittermaier, Leo Rosenberg, Ernst Beling and Reinhard Frank. From very early on, Engisch was strongly drawn not so much to the mainstream Jurisprudence curriculum but to the philosophy of law, seen then as now as more of a niche specialism. Two leading scholars who particularly influenced him in this field were Max Weber at the Ludwig-Maximilians-Universität München and Ernst von Aster at the University of Giessen.

During his time in Gießen, Karl Engisch, like his younger brother, Ludwig Engisch (1900–1957), was a member of the "Corps Hassia" fraternity. In 1924, Karl Engisch received his doctorate. Supervised by Otto Eger, his dissertation concerned Imperative Theory, an aspect of Legal Philosophy, and a theory which German sources impute to Jeremy Bentham and John Austin. He undertook a Rechtsreferendariat (loosely "training, clerkship or under articles") period between 1924 and 1927, working in his father's law practice. He took on criminal law cases.

In 1929, he received his habilitation (higher academic qualification) at the University of Giessen. His work was supervised by the criminologist Wolfgang Mittermaier (1867–1956) and comprised a substantial monograph on criminal intent and negligence which even today, despite dramatic swings back and forth in the evolution of criminal sciences in the intervening decades, continues to be regarded by admirers as a standard work in its field.

A powerful influence during this period was the Munich-based criminologist Ernst von Beling, to whom Engisch later dedicated his "Logische Studien zur Gesetzesanwendung" (loosely: "Logical studies in the application of law"). He accepted teaching posts in Criminal Law at the University of Freiburg (1929) and the Ludwig-Maximilians-Universität München (1932). In October 1933, he returned to take up a criminal law teaching post at the University of Giessen.

The Nazi seizure of power in January 1933 was followed, in April 1933, by the so-called "Law for the Restoration of the Professional Civil Service" ("Gesetz zur Wiederherstellung des Berufsbeamtentums"). The law was progressively implemented across the civil service (which in German included the universities sector) over the next few months. The man who held the teaching chair in Criminal Law at Heidelberg University, Gustav Radbruch, had been a government minister during the early 1920s. He was a Social Democratic.

Although not Jewish, Radbruch's political record meant that he was just the sort of person whom the authorities had in mind when designing their law. He was dismissed. Engisch was by now a party member and well regarded in the relevant academic circles. He took over the teaching chair in criminal law, criminal process and the philosophy of law at Heidelberg University. Despite the circumstances, Radbruch reacted with generosity. He said that he could think of no successor that he would prefer, and there are suggestions that Engisch would not have disappointed him. Clearly Engisch was not deeply political, and he failed to see through the Nazis in the early years. But sound academic scepticism protected him from slavish adherence to anyone's party line.

Where he cited Jewish authors in his written work, he simply ignored government strictures that they should go unacknowledged, even as many academic colleagues simply stopped acknowledging Jewish contributions in their work. Engisch displayed a certain amount of backbone in May 1935 after the student union called for a boycott of non-Aryan lecturers. As dean of the faculty he protested (unsuccessfully) when Nazi "SA" paramilitaries intervened against the university administration to enforce a boycott of Jewish lecturers, notably in respect of Ernst Levy. He was one of those jurists who rejected the intervention of Nazi ideology into the law, and avoided the inclusion of such themes in his own books. On the other hand, he did expressly, if crudely, support the government in a review he contributed in 1936 to "Archiv für die civilistische Praxis", a venerable and distinguished legal journal:

"The Laws of the National Socialist state are the leader's orders, and that makes them laws. Resistance by judges' and enforcement officers cannot carry the weight of law. Acts of forcible resistance cannot be called law where they blatantly contradict basic principles of National Socialism. In the final analysis these are personally generated concepts that border on embarrassing". (Note: Despite careful avoidance in his own books of any inclusion of those strands of Nazi ideology that the authorities sought to introduce into Germany's legal structure, Engisch did go on record in 1936 with a fulsome if crude endorsement of the government's approach to law. "The Laws of the National Socialist state are the leader's orders, and that makes them laws" ("Die Gesetze des nationalsozialistischen Staates sind Führerbefehle und als solche Recht"). "Resistance by judges' and enforcement officers cannot carry the weight of law." ("Richterliche und behördliche Zwangsreaktionen, die diesen Gesetzen widersprechen, sind kein Recht und können es auch nicht durch gleichsinnige Häufung werden"). "Acts of forcible resistance cannot be called law where they blatantly contradict basic principles of National Socialism." ("Ebensowenig könnten typische Zwangsreaktionen Recht heißen, die eklatant den Grundsätzen der nationalsozialistischen Rechtsanschauung zuwiderlaufen."). "In the final analysis these are personally generated concepts that border on embarrassing" ("Das sind schließlich Selbstverständnisse, die man sich fast auszusprechen geniert.") Karl Engisch, 1936, writing in Archiv für die civilistische Praxis)

During this period, Engisch turned down invitation to take up academic posts at Marburg University (1933), Leipzig University (1938) and the University of Vienna (1940). In June 1942, the Minister for Culture and Education appointed him Legal Counsel ("Rechtsbeirat") to Heidelberg University with responsibilities covering academic discipline.

War ended in May 1945, and the twelve Nazi years came to an end. The western two thirds of Germany was now divided into military occupation zones. Heidelberg University was a high-profile institution within the US occupation zone. On 2 January 1946, Karl Engisch was dismissed from his university posts on the orders of the US military commander. On 5 December 1946 his professorship was reinstated, however, and on 16 December 1950 he was granted tenure at Heidelberg for life. (In April 1950 he had turned down an invitation to move to the University of Hamburg.)

In 1953, he finally accepted an invitation to move. He transferred to the Ludwig-Maximilians-Universität München, taking over the teaching chair vacated by Edmund Mezger. He retired from the post only in April 1967. In the meantime, at the Kösener Senioren-Convents-Verband (association of student fraternities) congress, held on 27 May 1955, he delivered the main address at the Würzburg Residence (palace). He returned to Heidelberg where, on 30 November 1972, he accepted an honorary professorship and, till his death on 11 September 1990, delivered lectures on criminal law and the philosophy of law.

== Evaluation and celebration ==
In his lectures, Engisch knew how to expand his subject's horizons beyond the framework commonly accepted in the law faculty, introducing concepts from the worlds of philosophy and literature. Those whom he most frequently cited included Goethe, Kant, Thomas Mann and Schopenhauer.

He received honorary doctorates from Heidelberg University, the University of Mannheim and the University of Zaragoza. He was awarded the Bavarian Order of Merit in 1961, and enjoyed membership of the Heidelberg and Bavarian Academy of Sciences and Humanities, conferred respectively in 1938 and 1956. In 1971, he became a corresponding member of the Royal Academy of Science, Letters and Fine Arts of Belgium.

Engisch was a co-editor of two academic journals. He also possessed one of the largest specialist private libraries on legal theory of the times. Part of it had to be stored out of town at a separate site.

== Works ==
Among students his best known publication is probably "Einführung in das juristische Denken" ("Introduction to Legal Thinking") which first appeared in 1956. By 2005, it had reached its tenth edition. The work has been translated into Portuguese (1965), Spanish (1967), Greek (1981), and Chinese (2004).

=== Output (selection) ===
==== More substantive publications ====
- Die Imperativentheorie, Doctoral dissertation (law)., Gießen 1924 (unpublisherd), extracts published in: Auszüge aus den der juristischen Fakultät der Universität Gießen vorgelegten Dissertationen. Gießen 1925, pp. 42–47 (Fakultätsakten).
- Untersuchungen über Vorsatz und Fahrlässigkeit, Berlin 1930; Neudruck, Aalen 1964.
- Die Kausalität als Merkmal der strafrechtlichen Tatbestände, Tübingen 1931.
- Die Einheit der Rechtsordnung, Heidelberg 1935; Unchanged but reprinted with a foreword by Arthur Kaufmann, Darmstadt 1987.
- Logische Studien zur Gesetzesanwendung, Heidelberg 1943; 2nd edition, Heidelberg 1960; 3rd expanded edition, Heidelberg 1963.
- Logik der Rechtswissenschaften, unpublished transcript of eponymous lecture series, presented at the University og Heidelberg, Summer term 1947.
- Euthanasie und Vernichtung lebensunwerten Lebens in strafrechtlicher Beleuchtung, Stuttgart 1948.
- Vom Weltbild des Juristen, Heidelberg 1950; 2nd expended edition, now with an extensive afterword Heidelberg 1965.
- Die Idee der Konkretisierung in Recht und Rechtswissenschaft unserer Zeit, Heidelberg 1953; 2nd expanded edition, Heidelberg 1968.
- Einführung in das juristische Denken, Stuttgart 1956; 8. Auflage ebd. 1983; 9th edition produced by Thomas Würtenberger and Dirk Otto, Stuttgart 1997; Portuguese translation, Lisbon 1965; Spanish translation, Madrid 1967, Greek translation, Athens 1981.
- Die Lehre von der Willensfreiheit in der strafrechtsphilosophischen Doktrin der Gegenwart, Berlin 1963.
- Wahrheit und Richtigkeit im juristischen Denken, Münchener Universitätsreden, NF, H. 35, München 1963; ebenfalls In: Beiträge zur Rechtstheorie, produced by Paul Bockelmann, Arthur Kaufmann, Ulrich Klug, Frankfurt a. M. 1984, pp. 286–310; ebenfalls In: Rechtsphilosophie oder Rechtstheorie?, produced by von Gerd Roellecke, Darmstadt 1988, pp. 262–288.
- Auf der Suche nach der Gerechtigkeit, Hauptthemen der Rechtsphilosophie, München 1971.
- Der Arzt an den Grenzen des Lebens: strafrechtliche Probleme des Lebensschutzes, Bonn 1973.
- Beiträge zur Rechtstheorie, produced by Paul Bockelmann, Arthur Kaufmann, Ulrich Klug, Frankfurt a. M. 1984.

==== Essays and academic articles ====
- Notstand und Putativnotstand, In: MschKrim 23 (1932), pp. 420–429
- Interessenjurisprudenz und Strafrecht, In: MSchKrim 25 (1934), pp. 65–86.
- Zur phänomenologischen Methode im Strafrecht, In: ARSP 30 (1936/1937), pp. 130–149.
- Wesensschau und konkretes Ordnungsdenken im Strafrecht, In: MSchKrim 29 (1938), pp. 133–148.
- Logik der Rechtswissenschaft, In: Geistige Arbeit, Zeitschrift aus der wissenschaftlichen Welt, 8. Jhg. (1941), Nr. 7, pp. 1–3.
- Der finale Handlungsbegriff, In: Probleme der Strafrechtserneuerung, Festschrift für Eduard Kohlrausch, Berlin 1944, pp. 141–179.
- Der Begriff der Rechtslücke. Eine analytische Studie zu Wilhelm Sauers Methodenlehre, In: Festschrift für Wilhelm Sauer, Berlin 1949, pp. 85–102.
- Der rechtsfreie Raum, In: ZStaatW 108 (1952), S. 385–430; ebenfalls In: Beiträge zur Rechtstheorie, produced by Paul Bockelmann, Arthur Kaufmann, Ulrich Klug, Frankfurt a. M. 1984, pp. 9–64; Spanish translation, Cordoba 1964.
- Die normativen Tatbestandselemente im Strafrecht, In: Festschrift für Edmund Mezger, München und Berlin 1954, pp. 127–163.
- Sinn und Tragweite juristischer Systematik, In: Studium Generale, 10. Jhg. (1957), pp. 173–190; ebenfalls In: Beiträge zur Rechtstheorie, hrsg. von Paul Bockelmann, Arthur Kaufmann, Ulrich Klug, Frankfurt a. M. 1984, pp. 88–125.
- Tatbestandsirrtum und Verbotsirrtum bei Rechtfertigungsgründen, In: ZStW 1984, pp. 88–125.
- Die Relativität der Rechtsbegriffe, In: Deutsche Landesreferate zum V. internationalen Kongress für Rechtsvergleichung in Brüssel 1958, Berlin 1958.
- Aufgaben einer Logik und Methodik des juristischen Denkens, In: Studium Generale, 12. Jhg. (1959), pp. 76–87; ebenfalls In: Beiträge zur Rechtstheorie, hrsg. von Paul Bockelmann, Arthur Kaufmann, Ulrich Klug, Frankfurt a. M. 1984, pp. 65–87.
- Der Unrechtstatbestand im Strafrecht. Eine kritische Betrachtung zum heutigen Stand der Lehre von der Rechtswidrigkeit im Strafrecht, In: Hundert Jahre deutsches Rechtsleben, Festschrift zum hundertjährigen Bestehen des deutschen Juristentages, 1860–1960, Bd. 1, Karlsruhe 1960, pp. 401–437.
- Zur Natur der Sache im Strafrecht, In: Festschrift für Eberhard Schmidt, Göttingen 1961, pp. 90–121, ebenfalls In: Die ontologische Begründung des Rechts (ed. Arthur Kaufmann), Darmstadt 1965, pp. 204–243.
- Vom Sinn des hypothetischen juristischen Urteils, In: Existenz und Ordnung, Festschrift für Erik Wolf, Frankfurt a. M. 1962, pp. 398–420; ebenfalls In: Beiträge zur Rechtstheorie, hrsg. von Paul Bockelmann, Arthur Kaufmann, Ulrich Klug, Frankfurt a. M. 1984, pp. 169–219.
- Form und Stoff in der Jurisprudenz, In: Festschrift für Fritz von Hippel, Tübingen 1967, pp. 63–94; ebenfalls In: Beiträge zur Rechtstheorie, hrsg. von Paul Bockelmann, Arthur Kaufmann, Ulrich Klug, Frankfurt a. M. 1984, pp. 251–158.
- Recht und Sittlichkeit in der Diskussion der Gegenwart, In: Wahrheit und Verkündigung, Michael Schmaus zum 70. Geburtstag, München, Paderborn, Wien 1967, pp. 1743–1760.
- Tun und Unterlassen, In: Festschrift für Wilhelm Gallas, Berlin, New York 1973, pp. 163–196.
- Begriffseinteilung und Klassifikation in der Jurisprudenz, In: Festschrift für Karl Larenz zum 70. Geburtstag, München 1973, pp. 125–153; ebenfalls In: Beiträge zur Rechtstheorie, hrsg. von Paul Bockelmann, Arthur Kaufmann, Ulrich Klug, Frankfurt a. M. 1984, pp. 126–155.
- Logische Überlegungen zur Verbrechensdefinition, In: Festschrift für Hans Welzel, Berlin, New York 1974, pp. 343–378; ebenfalls In: Beiträge zur Rechtstheorie, hrsg. von Paul Bockelmann, Arthur Kaufmann, Ulrich Klug, Frankfurt a. M. 1984, pp. 156–195.
- Über Negationen in Recht und Rechtswissenschaft, In: Festschrift für Heinrich Henkel, Berlin, New York 1974, pp. 47–74; ebenfalls In: Beiträge zur Rechtstheorie, hrsg. von Paul Bockelmann, Arthur Kaufmann, Ulrich Klug, Frankfurt a. M. 1984, pp. 220–250.
- Formale Logik, Begriff und Konstruktion in ihrer Bedeutung und Tragweite für die Rechtswissenschaft, In: Festschrift für Ulrich Klug, Band 1, Köln 1983, pp. 33–54.
- Subsumtion und Rechtsfortbildung, In: Richterliche Rechtsfortbildung. Erscheinungsformen, Auftrag, Grenzen. Festschrift für die juristischen Fakultät zur 600-Jahr-Feier der Ruprechts-Karl-Universität Heidelberg, Heidelberg 1986, pp. 3–9.

Engisch also published many reviews and pieces of literary criticism.

== Notes ==
Note
