= Adolf Wach =

German jurist

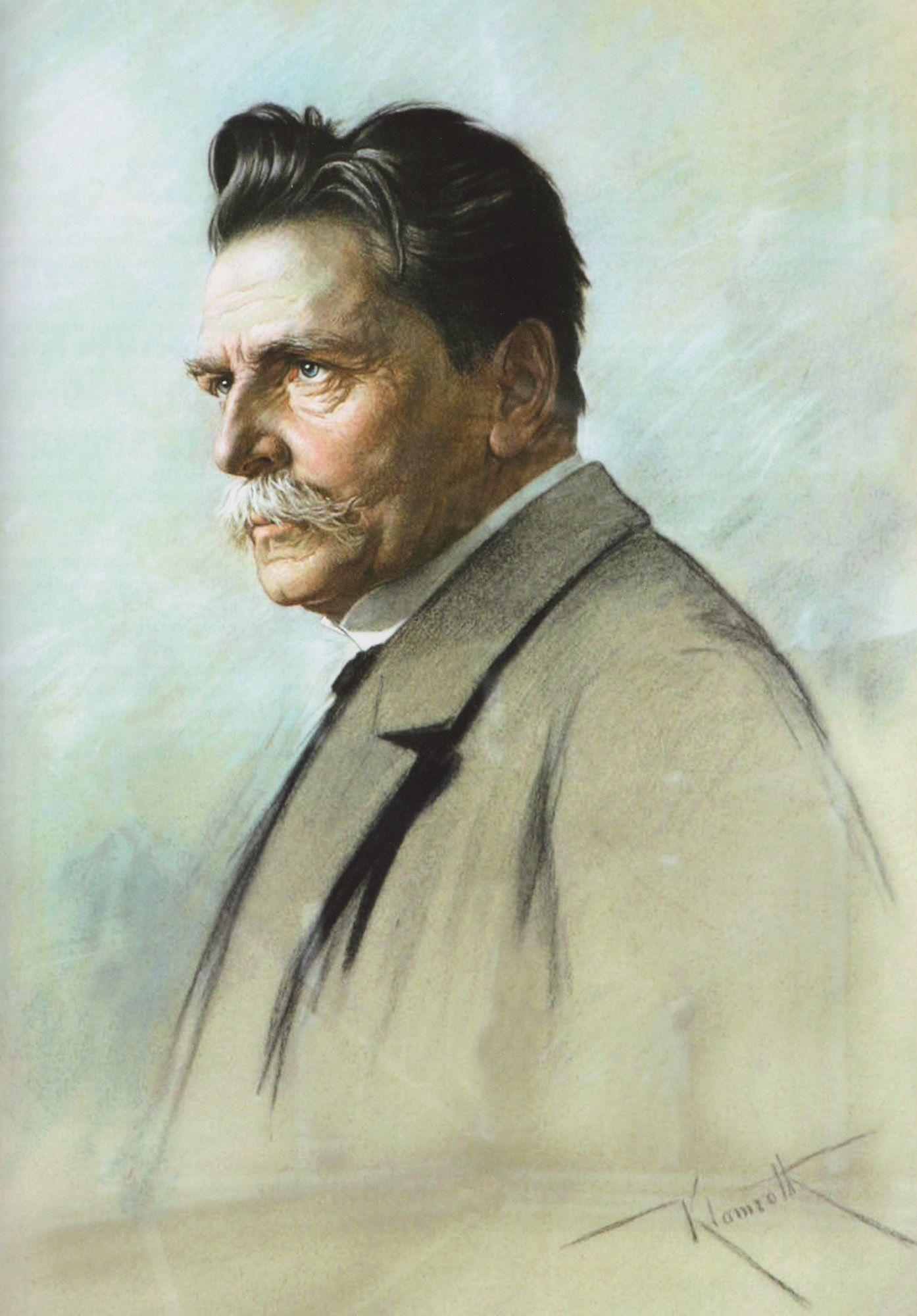
- Adolf Wach in 1907
- Born: 11 September 1843; Kulm, West Prussia, Kingdom of Prussia (Chełmno, Poland)
- Died: 4 April 1926 (aged 82); Leipzig, Weimar Germany
- Occupation: Jurist
- Spouse: Elisabeth Mendelssohn
- Children: 6

Academic background
- Education: Humboldt University of Berlin; University of Heidelberg; University of Königsberg; University of Göttingen

Academic work
- Discipline: Jurisprudence
- Institutions: University of Königsberg; University of Rostock; University of Tübingen; University of Bonn; University of Leipzig

Eduard Gustav Ludwig Adolph Wach, known as Adolf Wach (11 September 1843 – 4 April 1926) was a German jurist, a professor in Königsberg, Rostock, Tübingen, Bonn and Leipzig.

== Biography ==
Wach was born in Kulm, West Prussia, Kingdom of Prussia (Chełmno, Poland) to Adolph Leopold Wach (1804–1852), the town treasurer of Kulm, and Gustava Wach, née Suchland (?–1870). Wach passed his Abitur in 1861 at the gymnasium in Kulm and studied law at the Universities of Berlin, Heidelberg, Königsberg and Göttingen.

He received his doctorate in October 1865 and habilitated in Königsberg in 1868. From 1868 to 1869 he worked as Privatdozent of religious and Civil procedure law at the University of Königsberg. In 1869 Wach became an ordinary Professor for Civil procedure and penal law at the University of Rostock, in 1871 he transferred to the University of Tübingen and in 1872 to Bonn. From 1875 to 1920 Wach was ordinary professor for penal law, penal and civil procedure law at the University of Leipzig. Here he was also elected Decan of the juridical faculty in 1878/79, 1885/86, 1890/91, 1894/95, 1900/01, 1908/09 and 1918/19. From 1902 to 1903 he was Rektor of the University of Leipzig.

Wach retired in 1920 and died in Leipzig on 4 April 1926. He was buried next to his wife in Gsteig, Switzerland, where he had owned a holiday chalet.

== Family ==
Wach was married to Elisabeth (Lili) Mendelssohn (1845–1910), youngest daughter of Felix Mendelssohn. They had six children, their son Hugo Wach became Professor for architecture and ornamentation at the Technische Hochschule in Charlottenburg (now Technische Universität Berlin). Felix Wach, father of Joachim Wach, became a jurist and Saxon public official. The Wach family preserved the heritage of Felix Mendelssohn in a collection of letters, furniture and objects of art.

== Publications ==
- De transferenda ad firmarium advocatione, ex VII potissimum cap. X. de jur. patr. (III, 38) explicata (phd, 1865)
- Die Geschichte des italienischen Arrestprozesses (habil., 1868)
- Handbuch des deutschen Civilprozessrechts, Leipzig 1885
- Die Beweislast nach dem bürgerlichen Gesetzbuch, Leipzig 1901
- Struktur des Strafprozesses, München 1914.

== Awards ==
- Royal Saxon Geheimrat
- Civil Order of Saxony
- Order of the Zähringer Lion
- House Order of the Wendish Crown
- Swedish Order of the Polar Star
- Order of the Crown (Romania)
- Honorary citizen of Wilderswil
