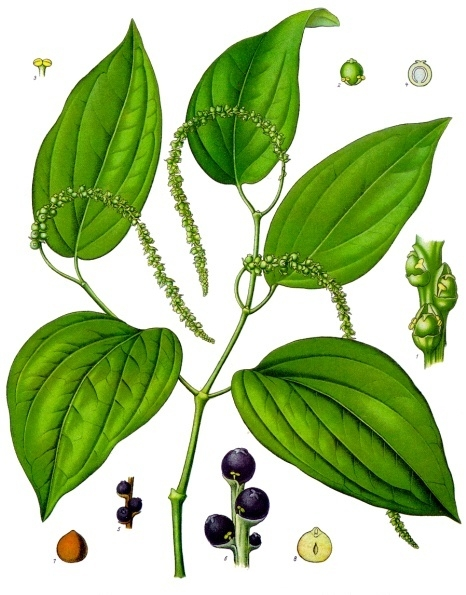
- Piper nigrum, from Koehler (1887)

Scientific classification
- Kingdom: Plantae
- Clade: Tracheophytes
- Clade: Angiosperms
- Clade: Magnoliids
- Order: Piperales
- Family: Piperaceae; Giseke

Subfamilies
- Verhuellioideae Trelease ex Samain & Wanke 2008; Zippelioideae (Miquel 1840) Samain & Wanke 2008; Piperoideae Arnott 1832

Synonyms
- Peperomiaceae Smith 1981

= Piperaceae =

Piperaceae Temporal range: Late Cretaceous – recent

Family of flowering plants in the order Piperales

The Piperaceae (/ˌpɪpəˈreɪʃiː/), also known as the pepper family, are a large family of flowering plants. The group contains roughly 3,600 currently accepted species in five genera, the vast majority within Piper and Peperomia. The bell and chili pepper, meanwhile, belong to a different family.

Piperaceae members may be small trees, shrubs, or herbs. The family's distribution is best described as pantropical. The best-known species, Piper nigrum, yields most peppercorns that are used as spices, including black pepper, although its relatives in the family include many other spices.

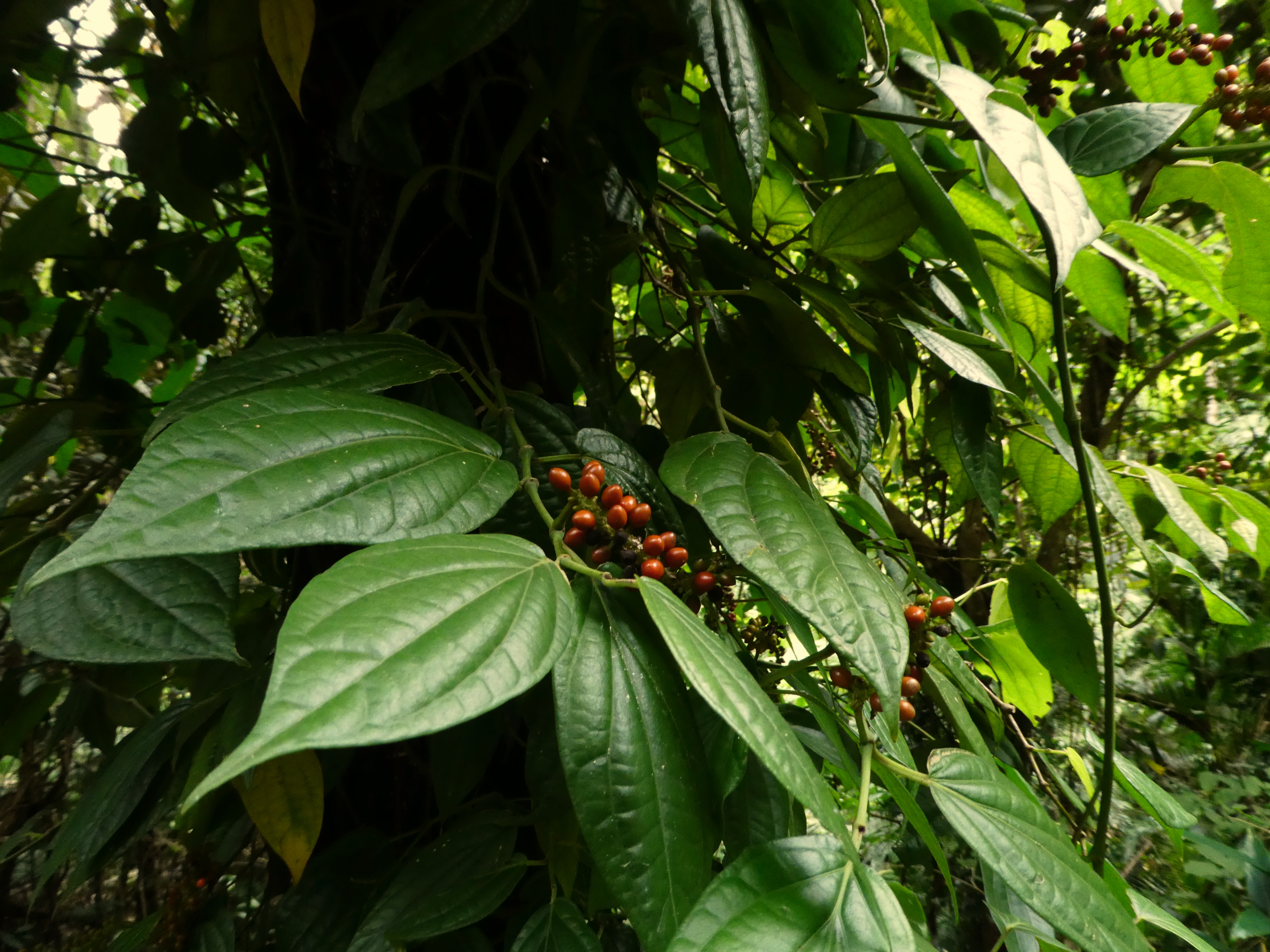
Piper caninum

== Description ==
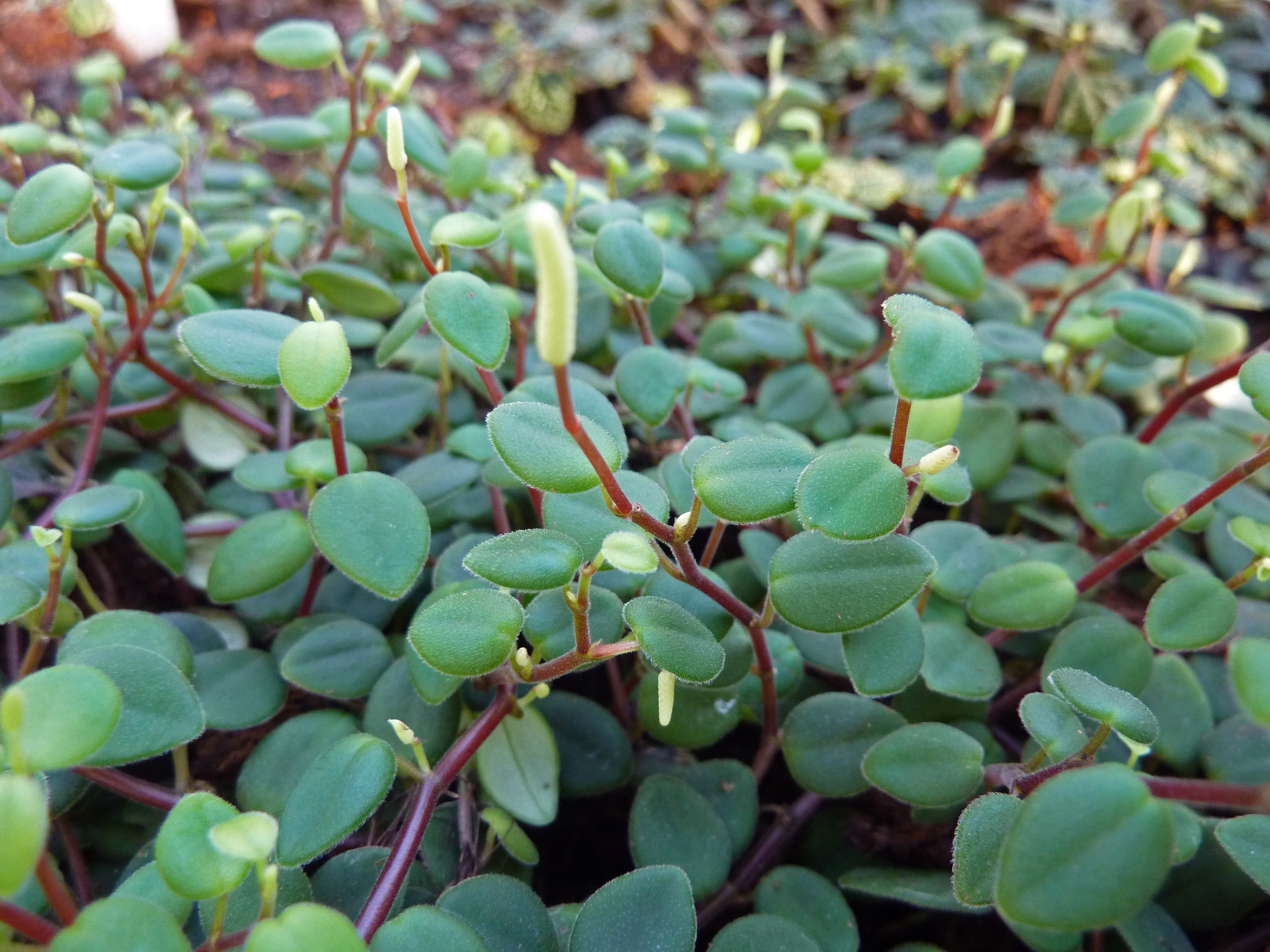
Peperomia perciliata

Members of pepper family are small trees, shrubs, or perennial or annual herbs. The plants are often rhizomatous and can be terrestrial or epiphytic. The stems can be either simple or branched.

The leaves are simple with entire margins, and are positioned at the base of the plant or along the stem, and can be alternate, opposite, or whorled in arrangement. Stipules are usually present, as are petioles. The leaves are often noticeably aromatic when crushed.

The inflorescences (in the form of spikes) are terminal, opposite the leaves, or located in the axils. The flowers are bisexual, with no perianth, and each subtended by a peltate bract. There are 2–6 stamens, which are hypogynous, with 2-locular anthers. There are usually three or four stigmas attached to a single pistil per flower, which is 1 or 3–4 carpellate. The ovary is 1-locular, and superior.

The fruits are drupelike, with a single seed per fruit. The seeds have a minute embryo, and mealy perisperm.

Production of pepper

Pepper yield

== Taxonomy ==
The APG III system of 2009 recognizes this family and assigns it to the order Piperales in the unranked clade magnoliids. The family consists of five genera: Piper, Peperomia, Zippelia, Manekia, and Verhuellia. The previously recognised Pacific genus Macropiper, was recently merged into Piper. A tentative cladogram showing relationships based on Wanke et al. (2007) is shown below. This phylogeny was based on 6,000 base pairs of chloroplast DNA. Only recently has it become clear that Verhuellia is sister to the other four genera in the family.

- Piperaceae
  - Verhuellioideae
    Verhuellia Miquel 1843 (three species)
  - - Zippelioideae
      - Zippelia Blume 1830 (one species)
      - Manekia Trelease 1927 (six species)
    - Piperoideae
      - Piper Linnaeus 1753 (about 2,000 species)
      - Peperomia Ruiz & Pavon 1794 (over 1,000 species)

The group contains roughly 3,600 currently accepted species in five genera. The vast majority of species can be found within the two main genera Piper (2,171 species) and Peperomia (over 1,000 species).

=== Etymology ===
The name Piperaceae is derived from the Sanskrit term pippali (पिप्पलि).

The family is unrelated to the South American family Solanaceae (the nightshades), which includes bell and chili peppers; Columbian-era Europeans thought the spicy fruits were a variety of the black pepper.

== Distribution and habitat ==
The distribution of this group is best described as pantropical.

== Uses ==
The best-known species, Piper nigrum, yields most peppercorns that are used as spices, including black pepper, although its relatives in the family include many other spices.

Numerous members of the family are used in the traditional medicine of indigenous population for a wide variety of illnesses. Many studies have been undertaken to investigate these uses, with a large number of them focusing especially on the active ingredient Piperine and related compounds found in many members of this family, especially black pepper, long pepper and Betel, as well as kavalactones found in Kava.
