= Joachim Wilhelm Franz Philipp von Holtzendorff =

German jurist (1829–1889)

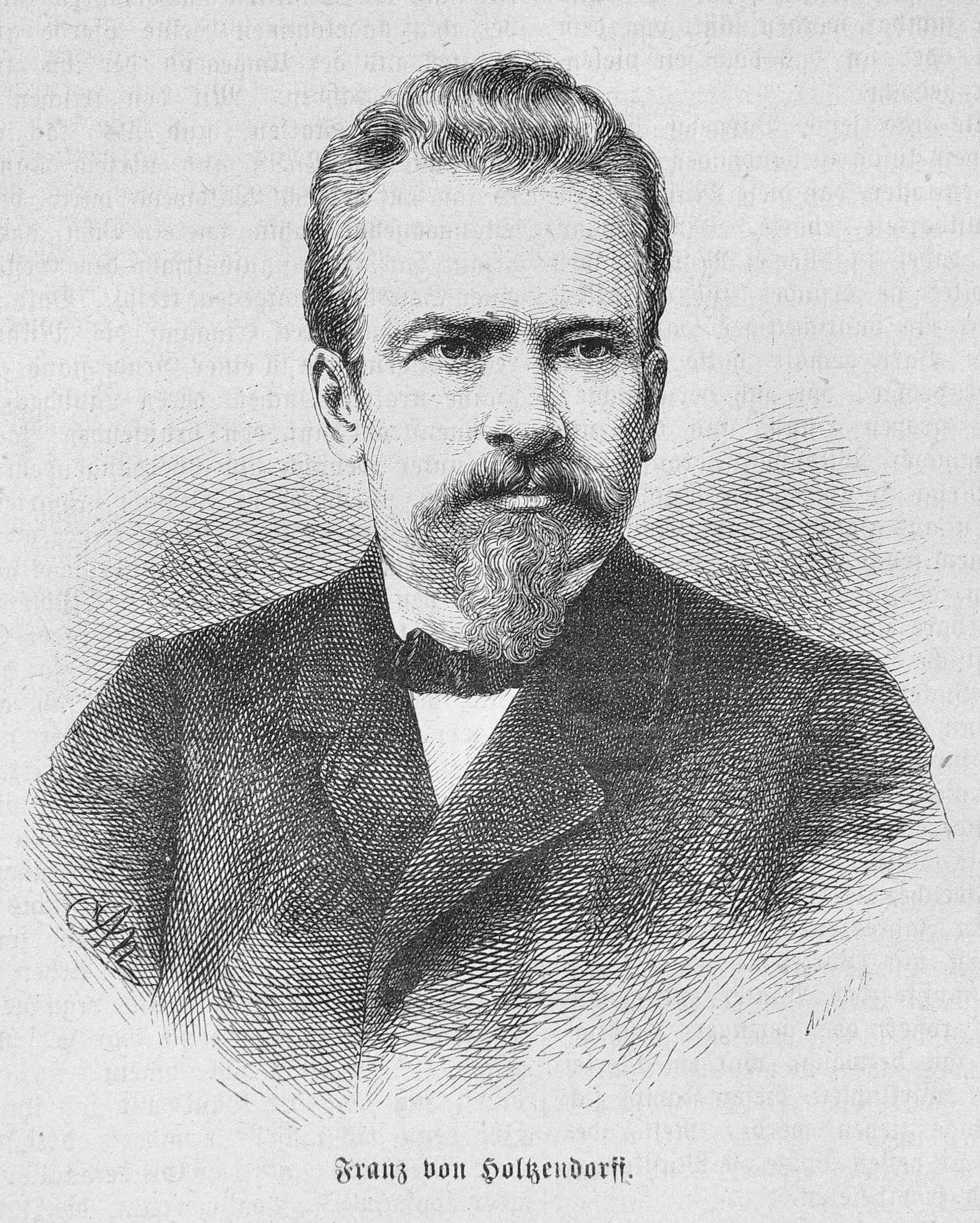
Joachim Wilhelm Franz Philipp von Holtzendorff.

Joachim Wilhelm Franz Philipp von Holtzendorff (October 14, 1829 – February 4, 1889), German jurist, born at Vietmannsdorf (a village in Templin), in the Mark of Brandenburg, was descended from a family of the old nobility.

He was educated at Berlin and at Pforta, afterwards studying law at the University of Bonn, Heidelberg University, and the Friedrich Wilhelm University of Berlin. The Revolutions of 1848 inspired him with youthful enthusiasm, and he remained for the rest of his life a strong advocate of political liberty. In 1852, he graduated LL.D. from the University of Berlin, and in 1857 he became a Privatdocent; in 1860 he was nominated an extraordinary professor.

The predominant party in Prussia regarded his political opinions with mistrust, and he was not offered an ordinary professorship until February 1873, after he had decided to accept a chair at the Ludwig-Maximilians-Universität München, where he passed the last nineteen years of his life. During the thirty years that he was professor he successively taught several branches of jurisprudence, but he was chiefly distinguished as an authority on criminal and international law.

He was especially well-suited to organizing collective work, and he has associated his name with a series of publications of the first order. While acting as editor, he often reserved for himself—among the independent monographs of which the work was composed—only those on subjects distasteful to his collaborators on account of their obscurity or lack of importance. Among the notable compilations which he superintended were the Encyclopädie der Rechtswissenschaft (Leipzig, 1870–1871, two volumes); his Handbuch des deutschen Strafrechts (Berlin, 1871–1877, 4 volumes), and his Handbuch des Völkerrechts auf Grundlage europäischer Staatspraxis (Berlin, 1885–1890, 4 volumes).

Among his many independent works were:

- Das irische Gefängnissystem (Leipzig, 1859)
- Französische Rechtszustände (Leipzig, 1859)
- Die Deportation als Strafmittel (Leipzig, 1859)
- Die Kürzungsfähigkeit der Freiheitsstrafen (Leipzig, 1861)
- Die Reform der Staatsanwaltschaft in Deutschland (Berlin, 1864)
- Die Umgestaltung der Staatsanwaltschaft (Berlin, 1865)
- Die Principien der Politik (Berlin, 1869)
- Das Verbrechen des Mordes und die Todesstrafe (Berlin, 1875)
- Rumäniens Uferrechte an der Donau (Leipzig, 1883; French edition, 1884)

He also edited or assisted in editing a number of periodical publications on legal subjects. From 1866 to the time of his death he collaborated with Rudolf Ludwig Karl Virchow in editing Sammlung gemeinverständlicher wissenschaftlicher Vorträge (Berlin). He gave a lecture on "European Jurisprudence", one of a series of twelve given by the American Social Science Association for the Lowell Institute for their 1876–77 season.
