= Franz von Liszt =

German jurist, criminologist and international law reformer (1851–1919)

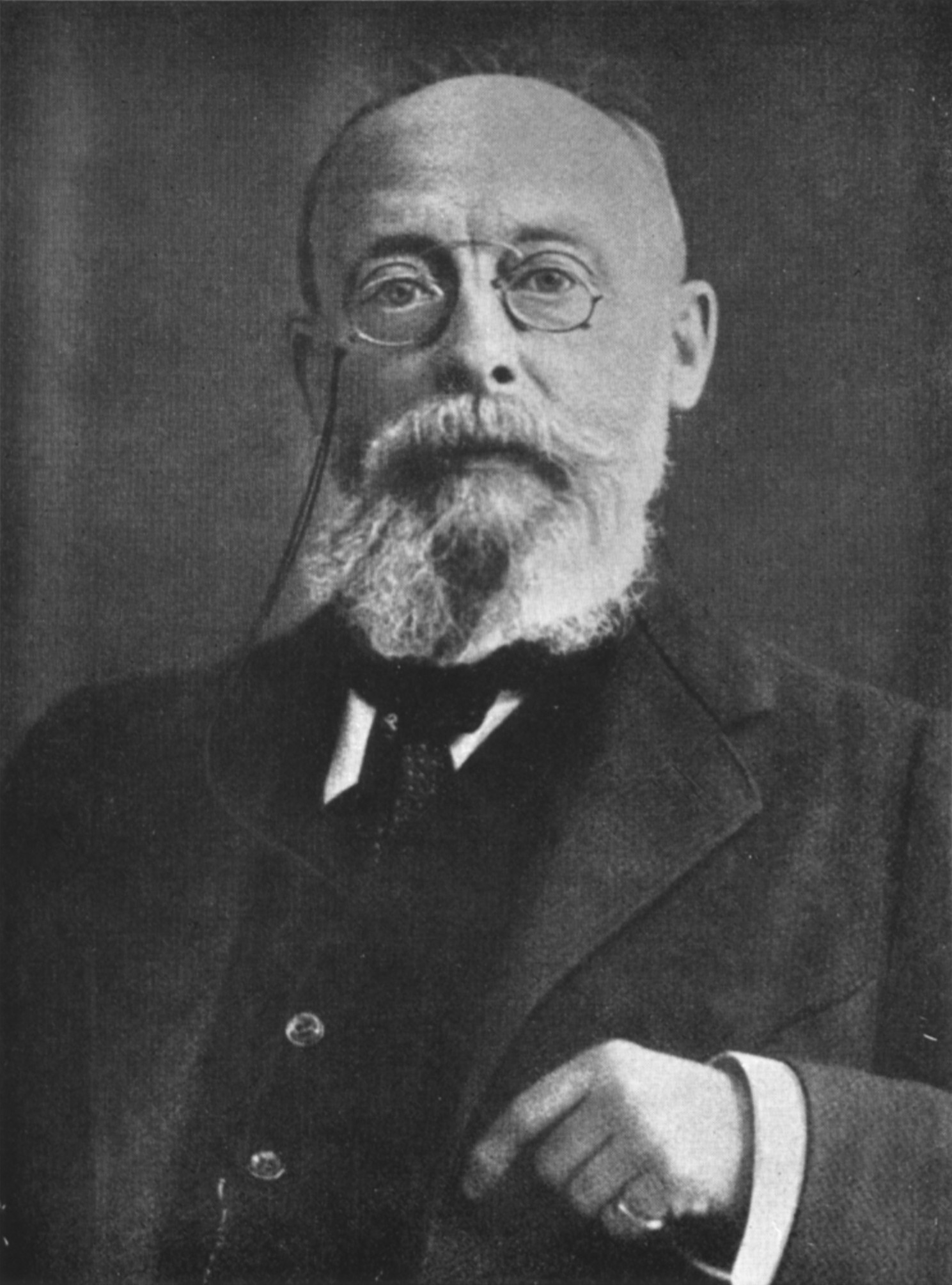
- Born: 2 March 1851; Vienna, Austrian Empire
- Died: 21 June 1919 (aged 68); Seeheim, Germany
- Education: University of Vienna (Ph.D.)
- Political party: Free-minded People's Party (until 1910); Progressive People's Party (from 1910)
- Movement: Marburg School
- Relatives: Franz Liszt (cousin); Adam Liszt (uncle); Anna Liszt (aunt)

Member of the Prussian House of Representatives for Potsdam 10
- In office 26 June 1908 – 7 May 1913

Member of the Reichstag for Liegnitz 3
- In office 7 February 1912 – 26 October 1918
- Preceded by: August Hoffmeister

Signature
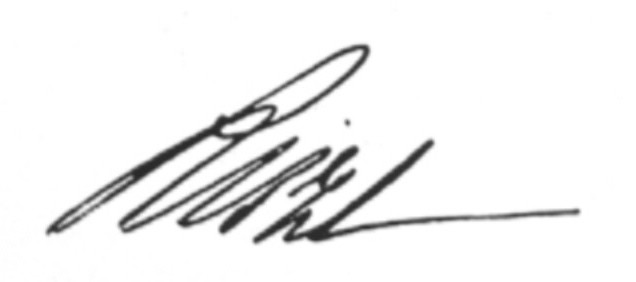

Franz Eduard Ritter von Liszt (2 March 1851 – 21 June 1919) was a German jurist, criminologist and international law reformer. As a legal scholar, he was a proponent of the modern sociological and historical school of law. From 1898 until 1917, he was Professor of Criminal Law and International Law at the University of Berlin and was also a member of the Progressive People's Party in the Prussian Chamber of Deputies and the Reichstag.

== Early life ==
Franz von Liszt's father was Eduard Ritter von Liszt (1817–1879), a lawyer who had completed a brilliant civil service career as the head of the newly created Austrian General Prosecutor's Office. Franz von Liszt's mother was Karolina Pickhart (aka Caroline Pickhardt) (1827–1854). Karolina, who was Eduard von Liszt's first wife, was born in Çilli, Turkey, and died of cholera in Vienna in 1854. Eduard von Liszt's second wife was Henriette Wolf (1825–1920), whom he married on 24 January 1859 in Vienna. The composer and virtuoso pianist Franz Liszt was Franz von Liszt's cousin and also acted as his godfather.

The Austrian title of nobility Ritter was awarded to the composer Franz Liszt in 1859 by the Emperor Francis Joseph I. The composer needed the title to marry the Princess of Sayn-Wittgenstein without her losing her privileges, so he solicited the nobilitation which was conceded by the emperor in recognition of his services to Austria. After the marriage fell through, the composer transferred the title to his uncle Eduard, the father of the subject of this article, in 1867 when he received the Minor Orders of the Catholic Church. The composer actually never used the title in public.

== Career ==
Liszt studied law in 1869 in Vienna, having among his teachers Rudolf von Ihering, who influenced him fundamentally in his views of the law and whose views he later transferred into criminal law. In 1874, Liszt, having earned a law degree and a Ph.D., quickly sought a university teaching career, which took him in 1876 to Graz, Marburg (from 1882), Halle (from 1889) and finally in 1898, at the peak of his career, to the largest law faculty of the Empire in Berlin, where he taught criminal law, international law and jurisprudence. In his 20 years there, he devoted himself almost exclusively to criminal law.

In 1882, while in Marburg, he held his first seminar on criminology and continued to work on building the scientific journal covering the entire field of criminal justice. He also founded the so-called "Marburg School" of criminal law, asserting that crime must be essentially looked upon as a social phenomenon.

In addition to the scientific aspect of the law, practical public policy also appealed to him. He was active in Berlin beginning in about 1900 in the Progressive People's Party and was a member of the City Council of Charlottenburg until 1908, when he was elected to the Prussian House of Representatives. In 1912, he was elected to the German Reichstag. However, he remained politically rather a backbencher, and always remained a thorn in the side of the governmental bureaucracy. As a liberal outsider with courage, he was sitting on the cross benches, so that in neither the established society of Prussia nor in the empire was there much support for his positions.

Liszt died on 21 June 1919, after a long illness, and was survived by his wife, Rudolfine, and two daughters, both of whom remained unmarried. This branch of the Liszt family has since become extinct.

Parts of Liszt's extensive library are housed in the Liszt Institute Library of Humboldt University of Berlin.

=== Criminal law work ===
His criminal law textbook, which was first published in 1881 with the title Das deutsche Reichsstrafrecht (German Imperial Criminal Law), renamed Lehrbuch des deutschen Strafrechts (Textbook of German Criminal Law) from the second edition, finally reached 26 editions by 1932. It presented a systematic approach to legal doctrine based on liberal ideas and the Rechtsstaat. A study of his influence and impact on criminal law should start with the "Marburg Programme", named after his inaugural speech in 1882, his theory of criminal law which was not based on retribution but opened the way for new objectives of criminal law, in particular preventive goals, as described in Der Zweckgedanke im Strafrecht (The Idea of Purpose in Criminal Law), 1882. The concept of punishment and criminal law based on the methods and ideas of positivism was directed against metaphysical justifications of retribution. Liszt wanted to overcome the prevailing theories of punishment by Immanuel Kant and Georg Wilhelm Friedrich Hegel. He tried to explain the crime by investigating the causes of the offender's behaviour. His theory of punishment was governed by the idea of purpose, in other words punishment was not for retribution (Karl Binding), but served the purpose of goal-oriented special prevention; for this reason Liszt is said to be the father of special preventive punishment theory, where punishment serves the purpose of deterrence, rehabilitation, and societal protection ("the Marburg Programme").

So his demands were: improvement of existing societal conditions and penal measures specifically aimed at the rehabilitation of the offender. With this in mind, he advocated differentiation of special prevention based on types of offender:

- "occasional offenders" should receive a suspended sentence as a lesson;
- "reformable offenders" should receive substantial custodial sentences, to be accompanied by rehabilitation measures; and
- "non-reformable offenders" should be given very long custodial sentences to protect society.

In 1889, he co-founded the International Criminal Law Association (German: Internationale Kriminalistische Vereinigung). His ideas were reflected in the penal reforms of the 20th century: abolition of short custodial sentences; suspended sentences on probation; measures for rehabilitation and societal protection, rehabilitation of offenders, and special measures for juvenile offenders.

As part of his lectures on criminal law and evidence, Liszt staged an experiment at the University of Berlin in 1902. In a classroom, two students began to have an angry argument, until one pulled out a gun. As the panicked students around them drew back, a professor tried to intervene – and a shot was fired. The professor collapsed to the ground. The witnesses, unaware that all three were actors following a script, were then taken outside and quizzed about what they had seen and heard. They were encouraged to give as much detail as possible.

All of the witnesses were incorrect. They put long monologues into the mouths of spectators who had said nothing; they "heard" the row as being about a dozen different imagined subjects, from girlfriends to debts to exams; they saw blood everywhere, when there was none. Most people got a majority of their "facts" wrong, and even the very best witness offered a picture that was 25 per cent fiction. The more certain the witness, the more wrong they were.

=== Dispute of schools of thought on punishment ===
Liszt early and often advocated criminology as a supplement to criminal law in a system of a comprehensive "criminal legal science."

German criminal law witnessed intense battles pitting consequentialists against deontologists, those who proposed punishment ne peccetur against those who preferred punishing quia peccatum est. The fiercest, and most prolonged, period of this dispute even had its own name, the "Clash of the Schools" (Schulenstreit), whose main protagonists were Liszt for the "progressive school," and Karl Binding, the originator of “norm theory” in German criminal law, for the "classical school." Binding was Liszt's great adversary, and many of Liszt's central views were formed in response, or at least in contradistinction, to Binding's.

To characterize the dispute between Liszt and Binding (and their associates and successors) as one between consequentialism and retributivism is misleading. It is important to keep in mind that both Liszt and Binding were thoroughgoing legal positivists. Binding argued that punishment was justified, and only justified, as the state’s response to a violation of a state norm. The essence of crime thus was the violation of a norm of positive law, rather than the commission of a wrongful act. The criminal law was not so much a demand of justice, or as Kant would have it, a "categorical imperative," as a state tool for the enforcement of state authority that the state may or may not choose to employ.

Liszt accused Binding and his fellow classicists of advocating pointless punishment, though most in reality believed that punishment served the purpose of maintaining state authority. Liszt insisted that punishment, to be legitimate in a modern enlightened state, had to serve some purpose. Punishment could never be an end in itself. More specifically, Liszt argued that punishment must (and does) seek to protect legal goods. These legal goods, in Liszt's view, included, broadly speaking, "the life conditions" of a given community so that crimes were all "those acts that this people at this time perceives as disturbances of its life conditions." Punishment served its purpose through rehabilitation (education), deterrence, or incapacitation, depending on the type of offender. The recidivist, for instance, would upon his third conviction of an offense motivated by "the strongest and most basic human drives" (including theft, robbery, arson, and rape, but also damaging property) be sentenced to an indeterminate prison term, to be served in a state of "penal servitude," with the use of corporal punishment to enforce prison discipline. Truly incorrigible offenders were to be imprisoned for life, because "we do not wish to behead or hang and cannot deport" them.

In keeping with their broadly treatmentist approach, Liszt and his fellow progressives called for more or less radical legislative reforms. The cumbersome, and legalistic, construct of criminal law doctrine was to be replaced by a more flexible, modern, scientific ("progressive") system for the proper diagnosis, and classification, of offenders, which was crucial for the prescription of the correction quality and quantity of peno-correctional treatment. Ironically these reform proposals did not come to fruition until after the Nazis took power in 1933. One of the Nazis’ first criminal law reforms was the Law Against Dangerous Recidivists and Measures Regarding Protection and Rehabilitation of November 1933, which established the "two-track" sanctioning system that remains in place today. Since then, two general types of sanction have been available: punishments and measures. Only punishments "properly speaking" are subject to constraints of proportionality between culpability and sanction. "Measures" instead are unrelated to culpability and are determined exclusively by the offender's peno-correctional diagnosis. So if he requires rehabilitative treatment, he might be sent to a drug rehabilitation clinic; if he requires incapacitative treatment, he might be incarcerated indefinitely. Freed of the constraints of proportionality between offense and sanction, "measures" are served independently—and where appropriate consecutively—to whatever "punishments" are imposed.

=== International law influence ===
Largely forgotten because of Liszt's work in the criminal law area is the fact that between 1898 and 1919, eleven editions of his textbook on international law were published. He contributed more to the dissemination of knowledge in this area of law than any previously published international law textbook author. He undertook an extensive effort to understand all existing international law and to make suggestions for the international community, on such subjects as naval warfare, the right citizens to fundamental human rights and on international extradition law. Liszt argued that: "From this basic idea [international legal intercourse] directly follows a whole series of legal norms, by which are defined the mutual rights and obligations of states and do not require any special treaty recognition in order to have obligatory force. They comprise a firm basis for all the unwritten legal rules of international law, and are its oldest, most important and holiest content." Liszt advocated the creation of a mandatory arbitration court, as he saw it as the first step towards effective integration of countries into a grand organized international federation. To ensure sustainable peace, Liszt called for a deeper integration of the bloc. Based on economic, cultural and geographical close cooperation, Liszt stated that he saw a "law of the groups of states" being created. After 1914, he reacted to questions about the design of a future League of Nations (Liszt: Völkerareopag). He advocated for a League of Nations with a coercive judicial power over its members. Liszt's work in this area documented the tension between classical and modern international law like no other.

== Works ==
- The German Reich Criminal Law, Berlin, 1881
- The Purpose of Thought in Criminal Law, Berlin 1882/83
- Criminal Law in the States of Europe, Berlin 1884
- International law. Systematically Presented (Das Völkerrecht systematisch dargestellt), 1st ed. Berlin, 1888; 11th ed. Berlin, 1918
- The Essence of the International Association of States and the International Prize Court, in: Festschrift for law faculty of Berlin, Otto von Gierke doctorate 21st Anniversary August 1910, Vol. 3, Wroclaw 1910 (ND Frankfurt 1969), p. 21 ff
- An Association of Central European States as the Next Target of German Foreign Policy, Leipzig, 1914
- "Nibelungen", in: Österreichische Rundschau 42 (1915), p. 87 ff
- "The Reconstruction of International Law", Pennsylvania Law Review 64 (1916), p. 765 ff
- Association of States for the International Community. A contribution to the reorientation of the States policy and International Law, Munich and Berlin, 1917
- "Violence or Peace League. An Exhortation in the Last Hour", in: NZZ No. 1428 v. 27 October 1918, p. 1
- Textbook of German Criminal Law, 22nd edition, Berlin, 1919
