= Child euthanasia in Nazi Germany =

Organized killing of mentally or physically disabled children in Nazi Germany

Child euthanasia (German: Kinder-Euthanasie) was the name given to the organized killing of mentally and physically disabled children and teenagers up to 16 years old during the Nazi era in over 30 Kinderfachabteilungen (children's departments). At least 5,000 children were victims of the program, which was a precursor to the subsequent murder of children in the concentration camps. This was among the most notable Nazi crimes against children.

== Background ==
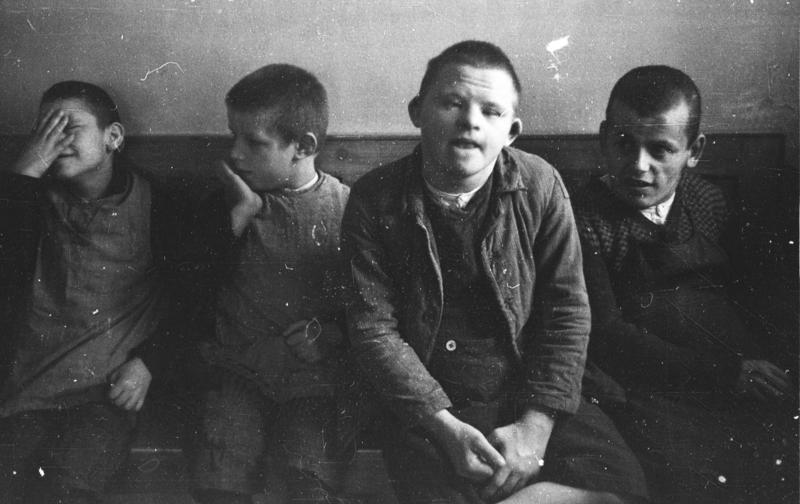
Schönbrunn Psychiatric Hospital, 1934. Photo by SS photographer Franz Bauer

Social Darwinism came to play a major role in the ideology of Nazism, where it was combined with a similarly pseudo-scientific theory of racial hierarchy in order to identify the Germans as a part of what the Nazis regarded as an Aryan or Nordic master race. This ideology held unreservedly to the notion of the survival of the fittest, at both the level of the individual as well as the level of entire peoples and states. This notion claimed to have natural law on its side. All opposing religious and humanitarian views would ultimately prove to be unnatural. A person could only prove its worth in the long run in this ongoing "struggle for survival", if they promoted the best and, if necessary, eliminated those that weakened them. Moreover, only a person as racially pure as possible could maintain the "struggle for existence". To maintain or improve the Nordic-Germanic race, therefore, the laws of eugenics or the (biologistically oriented) "racial hygiene" would have to be strictly observed, that is, the promotion of the "genetically healthy" and the elimination of the "sick". All those with hereditary illnesses or who were severely mentally and physically disabled were classified as "lives unworthy of life" (lebensunwertes Leben). They would, in terms of natural selection, be "eliminated". This form of eugenics was eventually the basis of the National Socialist genetic health policy which was elevated to the rank of state doctrine.

In 1929 Hitler said at the Nazi Party Conference in Nuremberg, "that an average annual removal of 700,000-800,000 of the weakest of a million babies meant an increase in the power of the nation and not a weakening". In doing so, he was able to draw upon scientific argument that transferred the Darwinian theory of natural selection to human beings and, through the concept of racial hygiene, formulated the "Utopia" of "human selection" as propounded by Alfred Ploetz, the founder of German racial hygiene. As early as 1895, he demanded that human offspring should not:

be left to the chance encounter of a drunken moment. [...] If, nevertheless, it turns out that the newborn baby is a weak and misbegotten child, the medical council, which decides on citizenship for the community, should prepare a gentle death for it, say, using a little dose of morphine [...] .

In 1935 Hitler also announced at the Nuremberg Nazi Party to the Reich Medical Leader Gerhard Wagner that he should aim to "eliminate the incurably insane", at the latest, in the event of a future war."

The elimination of "undesirable elements" was implemented under the term "euthanasia" at the beginning of the Second World War. Petitions from parents of disabled children to the Hitler's Chancellery (KDF) that asked for their children to be given "mercy killing" were used as a justifiable excuse and to demonstrate external demand.

== Phases of the Nazi euthanasia programme ==
The Nazi euthanasia killings may be broadly divided into the following phases:

1. Child euthanasia from 1939 to 1945
2. Adult euthanasia from 1940 to 1945
  1. Action T4, the centralised gas killings from January 1940 to August 1941
  2. Decentralised, but partly centrally-controlled medication-administered euthanasia or death by malnutrition from September 1941 to 1945
3. Disabled or detainee euthanasia, known as Action 14f13 from April 1941 to December 1944
  1. First Phase from April 1941 to April 1944
  2. Second Phase from April 1944 to December 1944
4. Action Brandt from June 1943 to 1945 (but recent research no longer counts this directly as part of the euthanasia complex.)

According to the latest estimates about 260,000 people fell victim to the "War Against the Sick".

== The case of "Child K" ==
The immediate occasion for the beginning of the organized euthanasia of children is considered in the literature to be the so-called case of "Child K". The common name, "Knauer Case", should not be used according to the findings of medical historian Udo Benzenhöfer.

In this particular case, the parents submitted a request that their severely disabled child be granted a "mercy killing", the application being received at an unverifiable time before the middle of 1939 at the Office of the Führer (KDF), also known as Hitler's Chancellery. This office was an agency of the Nazi Party and a private chancellery placed under the direct authority of Hitler which employed about 195 staff in 1939. Main Office IIb under Hans Hefelmann and his deputy, Richard von Hegener, was responsible for "clemency". The head of Main Office II and thus Hefelmann's superior was the Oberdienstleiter, Viktor Brack, one of the leading organizers of Nazi euthanasia.

Until recently the identity of the child had not been disclosed, although it was known to German medical historians. One German historian, Udo Benzenhöfer, argued that the child's name could not be disclosed because of Germany's privacy laws relating to medical records. In 2007, however, the historian Ulf Schmidt, in his biography of Karl Brandt, published the child's name (Gerhard Kretschmar), the names of his parents, the place of his birth and the dates of his birth and death. Schmidt wrote: "Although this approach [of Benzenhöfer and others] is understandable and sensitive to the feelings of the parents and relatives of the child, it somehow overlooks the child itself and its individual suffering... By calling the child 'Child K', we would not only medicalise the child's history, but also place the justifiable claim of the parents for anonymity above the personality and suffering of the first 'euthanasia' victim." Schmidt did not disclose whether the child's parents were still living.

According to the testimony of the participants, the request on 23 May 1939 led to a meeting of the parents of the child with the director of the University Children's Hospital, Leipzig, Werner Catel, about the chances of survival of the child. According to Catel's own statement, he held that the release of the child by an early death was the best solution for everyone involved. But because actively assisting death was still punishable in Nazi Germany, Catel advised the parents to submit an appropriate request to Hitler via his private chancellery. About this request, in a statement before the investigating judge on 14 November 1960, Hefelmann said the following:

I worked on this request, as it was in my department. Since Hitler's decision was requested, I forwarded it without comment to the Head of Main Office I in the KdF, Albert Bormann. As a simple act of mercy was being requested, I did not deem the involvement of the Reich Interior Minister and the Minister of Justice necessary. Because, as far as I know, Hitler had not made a decision with regards to such requests, it also seemed impractical to me, to involve other authorities.

To the recollections of his boss, Hefelmann's deputy, Richard von Hegener, added:

As early as about half a year before the outbreak of the war, there were more and more requests from incurably sick or very seriously injured people who asked for relief from their suffering, which was unbearable to them. These requests were especially tragic, because under existing laws a doctor was not allowed to take such wishes into account. Because the department, as we were reminded again and again, was under Hitler's orders to deal on precisely with such cases that could not be resolved legally, Dr. Hefelmann and I felt committed, after a while to take a number of such requests to Hitler's personal physician, the then senior doctor, Dr. Brandt, for him to submit and obtain a decision from Hitler on what should be done with such requests. Soon afterwards, Dr. Brandt told us that Hitler had decided, following this presentation, to grant such requests if it was proven by the doctor attending the patient as well as the newly formed health committee, that the suffering was incurable.

During the Nuremberg Doctors' Trial, Brandt said the following about the case of "Child K":

I personally know of a petition that was sent to the Führer in 1939 via his adjutant's office [Adjutantur]. The case was about the father of a malformed child who applied to the Führer asking that the life of this child or this creature would be taken. At the time, Hitler ordered me to address this matter and to go to Leipzig immediately - it had happened in Leipzig - in order to confirm on the spot what had been asserted. I found that there was a child who had been born blind, appeared imbecilic and who was also missing a leg and part of the arm. [...] He [Hitler] had given me the task, to discuss with the doctors in whose care the child was, to determine whether the disclosure of the father was correct. In the event that he was right, I was to tell the doctors, in his [Hitler's] name, that they could carry out euthanasia. In doing so, it was important that it should be done in such a way that the parents could not feel at any later stage that they themselves were burdened by the euthanasia [of their child]. In other words, that these parents should not have the impression that they themselves were responsible for the death of the child. It was further beholden on me to say that if these doctors themselves were involved in any legal proceedings as a result of these measures, carried out on behalf of Hitler, these proceedings would be quashed. Martin Bormann was then tasked, to notify this accordingly to the then Minister of Justice, Gürtner, in respect of this case in Leipzig. [...] The doctors were of the opinion that preserving the life of such a child was not actually justified. It was pointed out that it is quite normal that in maternity hospitals under certain circumstances for euthanasia to be administered by the doctors themselves in such a case, without calling it such, any more precise term is not used.

== Reich Committee for the Scientific Registering of Serious Hereditary and Congenital Illnesses ==
This first child euthanasia death led to a significant acceleration in the implementation of latent plans for "eugenic extermination", which began with the Law for the Prevention of Hereditarily Diseased Offspring, enacted on 14 July 1933, and eventually led in several stages to the euthanasia of children and adults (see Action T4, background and historical context). There was an almost parallel development of the decisions that resulted in the euthanasia programme for these two groups.

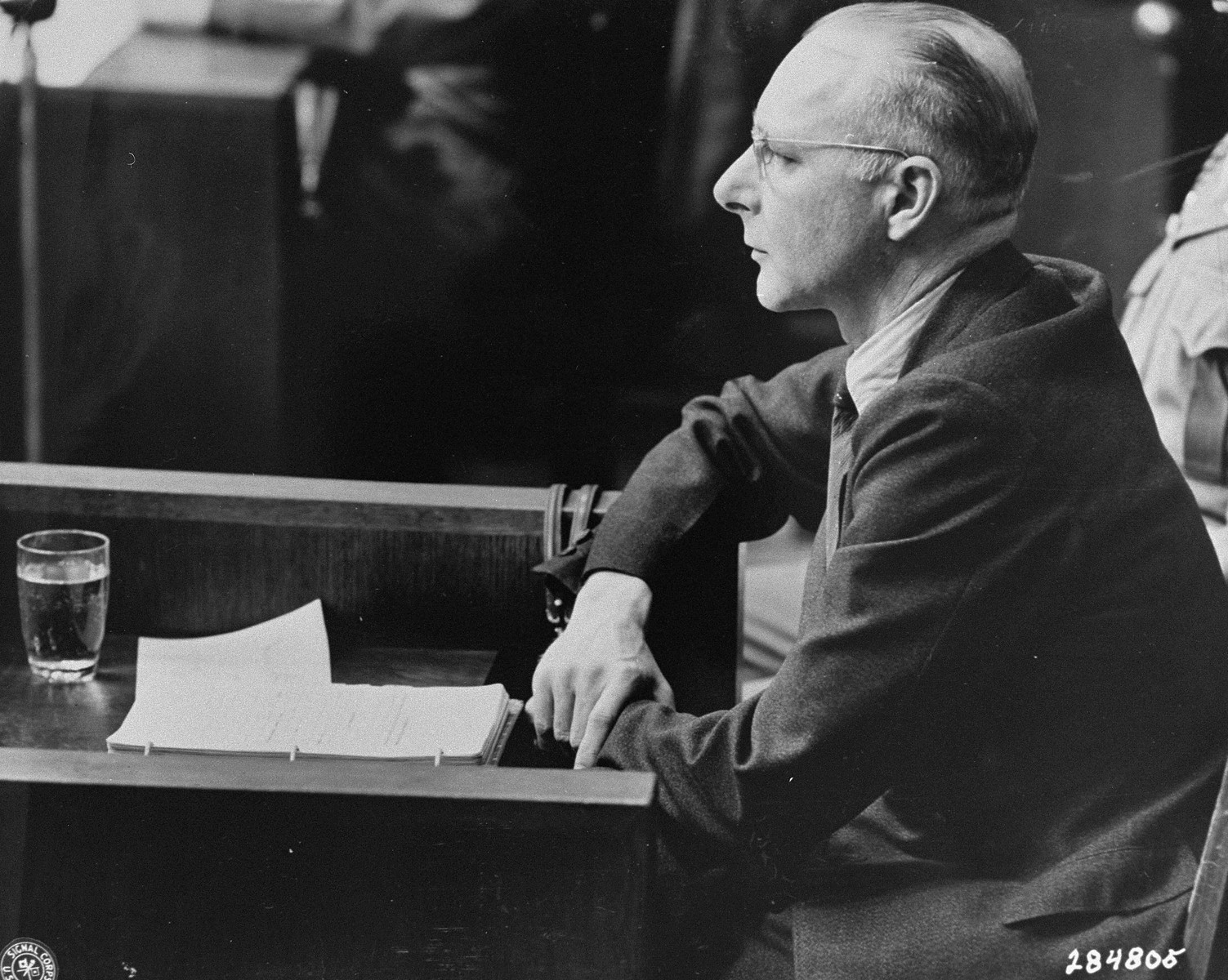
Viktor Brack testifies in his own defence at the Doctors' Trial in Nuremberg in 1947.

Hefelmann described this further development:

The Knauer case led to Hitler authorizing Brandt and Bouhler to do likewise in cases of a similar nature to that of the Knauer child. Whether this authorization was granted in writing or verbally, I cannot say. In any case, Brandt did not show us a written authorization. This authorization must have been granted, when Brandt told Hitler about the Knauer case. Brandt personally told me that this authorization had been granted in this way. At the same time, Hitler had ordered that all requests of this nature that were addressed to the Reich Ministry of the Interior or the Office of the Reichspresident, were only to be handled by his Chancellery. In pursuance of this arrangement, the Reich's Interior Ministry and Presidential Office were asked to forward such requests to the Chancellery. In this way, the then Under Secretary of the Interior Ministry, Dr. Linden, dealt with these matters for the first time, as far as I know. The subject was treated from the outset as top secret (Geheime Reichssache). When I was ordered shortly thereafter by Professor Brandt to put together an advisory body; it had to be treated as a top secret gathering. The result was that only those doctors, etc., were selected, of whom it was known had a positive attitude. Another reason for selecting them with that in mind was the fact that Hitler had ordered that his office, and therefore also his chancellery, was not to appear outwardly as the authority that handled these matters.

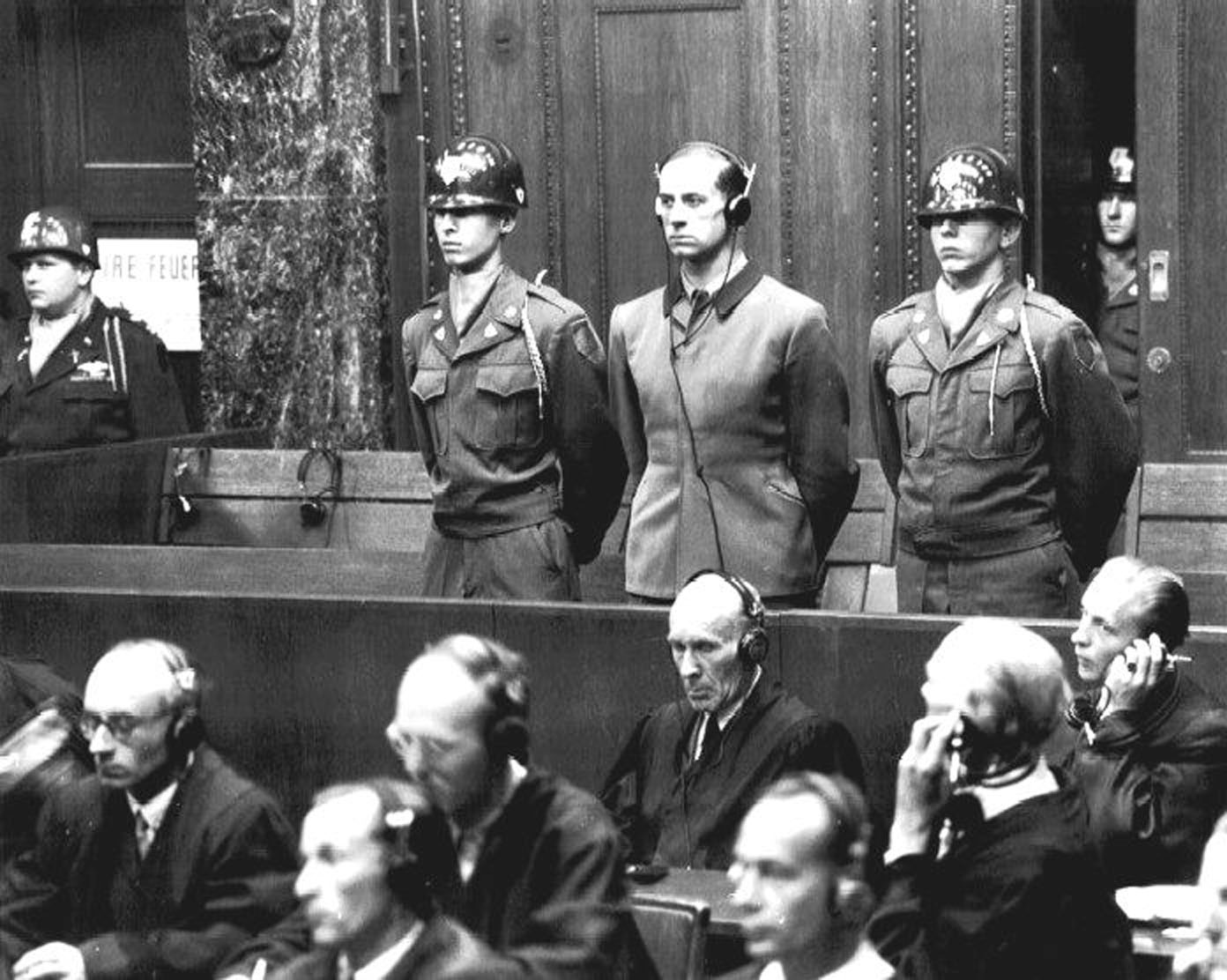
Karl Brandt on trial, 20 August 1947

The matter was initially discussed with an inner circle comprising Hefelmann and Hegener, head of the KdF's Central Office II, Viktor Brack and the person responsible for mental hospitals in Division IV (Health and Social Welfare) of the Reich Interior Ministry, Herbert Linden. In addition to the aforementioned, the committee assembled to organize child euthanasia consisted of Karl Brandt, the ophthalmologist Hellmuth Unger, a pediatrician Ernst Wentzler, the child psychiatrist Hans Heinze, and very probably also Professor Werner Catel. The issues at stake, which were also pertinent to preparations for the now impending adult euthanasia programme, were clarified in a brief but effective planning phase so that some three weeks after the first euthanasia case, a front organization was established under the name "Reich Committee for the Scientific Registration of Hereditary and Congenital Illnesses", that began to take the first concrete steps towards registering potential victims. The primary agents behind the front group were Hefelmann and Hegener from Office IIb of the KdF, who, at Hitler's request were not to appear publicly, nor was the only representative of a governmental authority, Linden from the Reich Interior Ministry. The so-called "national committee" was thus simply a "postbox" (Berlin W 9, PO Box 101). Correspondence went via this postbox to the KdF located in the New Reich Chancellery in Berlin's Voßstraße 4.

== Administrative aspects ==
The key document was a circular from the Reich Minister of the Interior of 18 August 1939, Ref: IVb 3088/39 - 1079 Mi, which was marked "Strictly Confidential" and specified the groups to be included and how they were to be assembled. After that, doctors and midwives together with maternity hospitals, obstetric departments and children's hospitals, except where a senior doctor was not present or did not get the instruction, were required to report in writing to the appropriate health authorities:

if the newborn child is suspected of being afflicted with the following congenital disorders:

- 1) Idiocy and mongolism (especially cases combined with blindness and deafness),
- 2) Microcephaly
- 3) Hydrocephalus, to a severe or advanced degree
- 4) Malformations of all kinds, particularly the absence of limbs, severe midline defects of the head and spine, etc.
- 5) Paralysis, including cerebral palsy.

A template of a reporting form was enclosed with the circular, which had to be sent by public health authorities as required to their higher administrative authority. This form was withdrawn by a decree of 7 June 1940 and replaced by an improved one. Uniquely, a reward of 2 RM for each report was given to the midwives affected "for professional services rendered".

Initially only children under the age of 3 were to be reported. The prescribed registration form gave the impression that registration was only being sought with the aim of providing special medical care. The district doctors sent the completed registration form to the National Committee where Office IIb of the KdF with its two medical laymen, Hefelmann and Hegener, screened out cases that they considered should not be sent to a Kinderfachabteilung, i.e. which meant that they were not eligible for euthanasia. Of approximately 100,000 registration forms received up to 1945, about 80,000 were screened out. For the professional assessment of the remaining 20,000, three experts were appointed from the National Committee who had been heavily involved in the preparatory committee, namely Werner Catel, Hans Heinze and Ernst Wentzler. Hefelmann commented later,

that Professor Heinze and Dr. Wentzler [...] supported euthanasia with great enthusiasm and Professor Catel with conviction, and so they agreed without any pressure to so act as expert assessors.

These three received the registration forms in sequence, so that the third expert knew the assessment of his two predecessors. The decision over life or death of the child was taken only on the basis of the reporting form, without the experts having seen the child's medical records nor the child in person. If a child was assessed as a euthanasia case, the reviewers gave it a red "+" and conversely a blue "-" if they were screened out. If no clear decision was possible from the perspective of the evaluators a "B" for Beobachtung ("observation") was entered. These children were temporarily reprieved of euthanasia, but still committed to a Kinderfachabteilung. Following closer examination the local doctor then had to make an appropriate observation report to the National Committee. The decisive criteria for a "positive" assessment were the child's projected work and education disability. According to a statement by the senior doctor, Walter Schmidt, who ran the Kinderfachabteilung of the Eichberg Mental Hospital, 95% of the assigned children came with the authority to "treat", a euphemism for the killing. Only the remaining 5% were observed and further investigated.

Included on these forms was a section indicating the race of the patient, for which 'Jew' could be entered if applicable. Among the best preserved of these evaluation records belonged to an adult patient, "Klara B.", who was institutionalized at Am Steinhof, where the Children's Ward Am Spiegelgrund was also located. Highlighted in red pen are the terms "Jüdin" (Jew) and her diagnosis of "Schizophrenia". The red "+"s on the bottom left of her form marked her for euthanasia. She was transferred from the Vienna facility to Hartheim, where she was gassed on August 8, 1940, at the age of 31.

The health authority responsible and the proposed Kinderfachabteilung received a notice from the National Committee of its decision and assignment. The local doctor then had to initiate the referral and notify the parents. The latter, however, were deliberately misled about the actual purpose of the referral, being tricked into believing it was for the special care and treatment of their children by specially equipped departments. Coercive measures were initially avoided. However, if parents persistently refused to agree to the referral of their child, they could be threatened with the loss of parental rights as of September 1941.

As early as the first half of 1941 the age of the children was specified as up to 16 years in order to prevent mentally or physically disabled young people being gassed as victims of a "summary method" within the framework of the Action T4. The circle of those affected was widened more and more. In addition to the mentally and physically disabled all so-called psychopaths were subsequently registered. In the Kalmenhof therapy centre, those "unfit for society" (that is, pupils with behavioural problems) were sent to the Nazi euthanasia centre of Hadamar to be gassed or, after Action T4 was stopped, to be killed by the administering of lethal drugs. Hadamar established its own "nurturing home" for this purpose. At least 40 to 45 of the inmates were killed using drug overdoses here, a method practised in the adult euthanasia programme.

== Kinderfachabteilungen ==
A circular dated 1 July 1940 Ref: IVb-2140/1079 Mi, which was published in the ministerial journal of the Reich and Prussian Ministry of the Interior, informed the Ministry that the "National Committee":

had now established a youth psychiatric department in the Görden State Institute near Brandenburg a.H. that employed under scientific direction all therapeutic options available based on the latest scientific findings.

In fact the first Kinderfachabteilung had been established in Görden State Institute in October 1939. The head of this institute was National Committee assessor, Hans Heinze. Hefelmann recalled "about 30 Kinderfachabteilungen" in his statement on 17 May 1961. According to the current state of research about 37 "children's wards", were set up in existing medical and nursing homes, children's hospitals and university clinics.

The practical difficulties in implementing the arrangements may be seen from another circular by the Minister of the Interior on 20 September 1941 Az.: IVb-1981/41-1079 Mi. Reich Health Leader and Secretary of State Leonardo Conti pointed out the fundamental importance of the matter to the national community. He made clear once again that the placing of sick children in asylums:

prevents the neglect by the family of other healthy children [...] The National Committee for the Scientific Registration of Hereditary and Congenital Illnesses has appointed outstanding experts on the relevant sphere of medical specialisation to carry out its duties [...] The National Committee still has funds available to intervene in those specific cases where the parents may not be in need of help, but may find it difficult to shoulder the cost of institutional care themselves.

Local doctors were instructed to oversee the reporting task laid on the midwives, to support the work of the National Committee in every way and, if necessary, put the necessary pressure on the parents.

== Children as objects of medical research ==
Sergio de Simone (29 November 1937–20 April 1945), a 7 year old Jewish-Italian boy killed at the Bullenhauser Damm School

Even though the children authorised for "treatment" were to be killed immediately as a rule, they were sometimes used for months in scientific research. For example, there was close collaboration between the head of the Kinderfachabteilung in the Eichberg State Mental Hospital, Walter Schmidt, and the director of the University of Heidelberg's Psychiatric Clinic, Carl Schneider. These victims were closely observed clinically in Heidelberg and then moved to Eichberg, where they were killed and their brains were removed. There is evidence of a study of 52 children with disabilities, of which at least 21 were later killed in Eichberg. Schneider then received the preserved brains for his histopathological research.

The Children's Ward Am Spiegelgrund in Vienna earned a similar notoriety, as the primary institution of Heinrich Gross, who served as its head for two years during Nazi occupation. At least 789 children died via gassing, lethal injection, malnutrition, disease, or neglect; after autopsy, many of their brains were kept for research. Dr. Gross performed unauthorized autopsies on the brains of his child victims and, between the years 1954 and 1978, published 34 works dedicated to 'cases of congenital and early onset mental disorders'. In the 1950s, Gross donated partial corpses of approximately twenty Spiegelgrund victims to the Neurological Institute of the University of Vienna, which formed the basis of at least two publications. Authors of these publications included Franz Seitelberger and Hans Hoff, among others. These same 'specimens' – unlawfully taken from these child victims – were further passed on to the Max Planck Institute for Brain Research, at the time headed by Julius Hallervorden.

On the night of 20 April 1945, twenty Jewish children who had been used in medical experiments at Neuengamme, their four adult Jewish caretakers and six Red Army prisoners of war (POWs) were killed in the basement of the school. Later that evening, 24 Soviet POWs who had also been used in the experiments were brought to the school to be murdered. The names, ages and countries of origin were recorded by Hans Meyer, one of the thousands of Scandinavian prisoners released to the custody of Sweden in the closing months of the war. Neuengamme was used as a transit camp for these prisoners.

== See also ==
- Bullenhuser Damm
- Am Spiegelgrund clinic
- Nazi birthing centres for foreign workers

== Literature ==
- Gerhardt Schmidt: Selektion in der Heilanstalt 1939–1945 ("Selection in the Mental Institution"). New edition with expanded text, published by Frank Schneider. Springer, Berlin 2012, ISBN 978-3-642-25469-7.
- Lutz Kaelber, Raimond Reiter (ed.): Kinder und "Kinderfachabteilungen" im Nationalsozialismus. Gedenken und Forschung. ("Children and Special Children's Wards under the Nazis. Remembrance and Research."), Frankfurt 2011, ISBN 978-3-631-61828-8
- Thomas Beddies, Kristina Hübener (ed.): Kinder in der NS-Psychiatrie. ("Children under Nazi Psyschiatry", series on the medical history by the State of Brandenburg, Vol. 10), Be.bra-Wissenschafts-Verlag, Berlin 2004, ISBN 3-937233-14-8
- Udo Benzenhöfer:
  - Der gute Tod? Geschichte der Euthanasie und Sterbehilfe ("The Good Death? History of Euthanasia and Assisted Dying"), Vandenhoeck & Ruprecht, Göttingen, 2009, ISBN 978-3-525-30162-3
  - Kinderfachabteilungen und NS-Kindereuthanasie. ("Special Children's Wards and Nazi Child Euthanasia", Studies on the History of Medicine under Nazism, Vol. 1), GWAB-Verlag, Wetzlar, 2000, ISBN 3-9803221-2-2
  - Kinder- und Jugendlicheneuthanasie im Reichsgau Sudetenland und im Protektorat Böhmen und Mähren. ("Child and Youth Euthanasia in the Reichsgau of Sudetenland and in the Protectorate of Bohemia and Moravia.", Studies on the History of Medicine under Nazism, Vol. 5), GWAB-Verlag, Wetzlar, 2006, ISBN 978-3-9808830-8-5
  - Der Fall Leipzig (alias Fall Kind Knauer) und die Planung der NS-Kindereuthanasie. (The Fall of Leipzig (alias Fall of Child Knauer) and the Planning of Nazi Child Euthanasia."), Klemm & Oelschläger, Münster, 2008, ISBN 978-3-932577-98-7
- Andreas Kinast: "Das Kind ist nicht abrichtfähig." Euthanasie in der Kinderfachabteilung Waldniel 1941–1943. ("The Child is Not Capable of Training. Euthanasia in the Special Children's Ward at Waldniel."), Series: Rheinprovinz, 18. SH-Verlag, Cologne, 2010, ISBN 3894982594
- Ernst Klee:
  - Euthanasie im NS-Staat. ("Euthanasia in the Nazi State"), 11th ed., Fischer-Taschenbuch, Frankfurt am Main 2004, ISBN 3-596-24326-2
  - Was sie taten – Was sie wurden. Ärzte, Juristen und andere Beteiligte am Kranken- oder Judenmord. ("What They Did - What They Were. Lawyers and Other Participants in the Murder of Jews and the Sick"), 12th ed., Fischer, Frankfurt, 2004, ISBN 3-596-24364-5
  - Dokumente zur Euthanasie. ("Documents on Euthanasia"), Fischer, Frankfurt, 1985, ISBN 3-596-24327-0
  - Das Personenlexikon zum Dritten Reich. Wer war was vor und nach 1945? ("The Staff Lexicon of the Third Reich. Who was Who Before and After 1945?"), Fischer, Frankfurt, 2005, ISBN 3-596-16048-0
- Henry Friedlander: Der Weg zum NS-Genozid. Von der Euthanasie zur Endlösung. ("The Route to Nazi Genocide. From Euthanasia to the Final Solution"), Berlin-Verlag, Berlin 1997, ISBN 3-8270-0265-6
- Götz Aly (Hrsg.): Aktion T4 1939–1945. Die Euthanasie-Zentrale in der Tiergartenstraße 4. ("Action T4 1939-1945. The Euthanasia Headquarters in Tiergartenstraße 4."), Berlin, 1989, ISBN 3-926175-66-4
- Peter Sandner: Verwaltung des Krankenmordes. Der Bezirksverband Nassau im Nationalsozialismus. ("Management of Murdering the Sick. The Nassau District Association under Nazism."), Psychosozial-Verlag, Gießen, 2003, ISBN 3-89806-320-8
- Christine Vanja, Steffen Haas, Gabriela Deutschle, Wolfgang Eirund, Peter Sandner (ed.): Wissen und irren. Psychiatriegeschichte aus zwei Jahrhunderten – Eberbach und Eichberg. ("Knowledge and Error. Psychiatric History from Two Centuries – Eberbach and Eichberg."), Historic Series by the State Charity Association of Hesse, sources and studies, Vol. 6, Kassel, 1999, ISBN 3-89203-040-5
- Alexander Mitscherlich, Fred Mielke: Medizin ohne Menschlichkeit. ("Medicine Without Humanity"), Frankfurt am Main 1987, ISBN 3-596-22003-3
- Götz Aly, Angelika Ebbinghaus, Matthias Hamann, Friedemann Pfäfflin, Gerd Preissler (Hrsg.): Aussonderung und Tod. Die klinische Hinrichtung der Unbrauchbaren. ("Selection and Death. The Clinical Execution of the Unusable."), Berlin, 1985, ISBN 3-88022-950-3
- Heilen und Vernichten im Nationalsozialismus. ("Healing and Extermination under Nazism."), Tübinger Vereinigung für Volkskunde e. V., Projektgruppe "Volk und Gesundheit", Tübingen 1982
- Angelika Ebbinghaus, Klaus Dörner (ed.): Vernichten und Heilen. Der Nürnberger Ärzteprozeß und seine Folgen. ("Extermination and Healing. The Nuremberg Doctors' Trial and its Consequences.") Berlin, 2002, ISBN 3-7466-8095-6
- Berit Lahm, Thomas Seyde, Eberhard Ulm (ed.): 505 Kindereuthanasieverbrechen in Leipzig. ("505 Child Euthanasia Crimes in Leipzig.") Plöttner Verlag, Leipzig, 2008, ISBN 978-3-938442-48-7
- Susanne Zimmermann: Überweisung in den Tod. Nationalsozialistische "Kindereuthanasie" in Thüringen. ("Assignment to Death. Nazi Child Euthanasia in Thuringia.") (sources on the History of Thuringia, Vol. 25., Thuringia State Office for Political Education. Erfurt, 2008, ISBN 978-3-931426-91-0
- Astrid Viciano: Die approbierten Mörder. ("Approved Murders") (at the exhibition Tödliche Medizin – Rassenwahn im Nationalsozialismus ("Deadly Medicine - Racial Fanaticism under the Nazis") in the German Hygiene Museum, Dresden), in: Die Zeit, No. 42 dated 12 October 2006
