= Richard von Hegener =

Organizer of the Aktion T4 Nazi German "euthanasia" program

- Born: 2 September 1905; Sensburg, East Prussia, German Empire
- Died: 18 September 1981 (aged 76); Altona, Hamburg, West Germany
- Known for: Action T4 Nazi "euthanasia" program

Richard von Hegener (2 September 1905 – 18 September 1981) was a primary organizer of the Nazi German "euthanasia" program within Hitler's Chancellery. After the war, he gave evidence against other participants in the program.

== Biography ==
Hegener was born in Sensburg, East Prussia, in 1905. He trained as a banker, working for Dresdner Bank as an accountant. After losing his job because of the Depression, he founded a dye works, which, however, went bankrupt. He joined the Nazi Party in 1931. In 1937, an acquaintance enabled him to find a job at the Reich Chancellery, and he was transferred to Hitler's Chancellery. Initially he worked as a clerk sorting mail addressed to Hitler and processing applications from part-Jews, so-called Mischlinge, who wished to marry. By 1939, the year Hitler gave permission for the program to "euthanize" handicapped children, he had become deputy to Hans Hefelmann and office manager in Department IIb, which processed ministerial matters and requests for clemency.

With the beginning of the "child euthanasia" program, the first stage in the program that would become known after World War II as Action T4, several front organizations were founded to conceal the involvement of Hitler's chancellery and of the Department of the Interior. One of these was a Reichsausschuss zur wissenschaftlichen Erfassung von erb- und anlagebedingten schweren Leiden (Reich Committee for Research on Hereditary and Constitutional Susceptibility to Severe Diseases), which was a front for Hans Hefelmann and Department IIb. To transport people to be killed according to the program, the Gemeinnützige Krankentransport GmbH (General Patients' Transport Corporation, known as Gekrat) was organized, headed by Reinhold Vorberg of Department IIc. Hegener was responsible for logistics and obtained Post Office buses for Gekrat; as a result, Gekrat was internally referred to as "Hegener's Special Group".

Hegener later provided an account of how the method of killing was decided: injections and overdoses of narcotics were ruled out as impractical and it was decided to use carbon monoxide gas, filling a room at a suitably located clinic with the gas in order to terminate a large group at a time. This was the origin of the gas chambers. Hegener was present at a test of the methodology that took place in January 1940 at the old jail in Brandenburg an der Havel (later Brandenburg Euthanasia Center) and was subsequently responsible for obtaining the necessary materials for constructing the gas chambers and cremation facilities at the "euthanasia centers", as well as for the delivery of the gas. He ordered what was needed both for the child killing program and for the adults, including the large amounts of drugs such as phenobarbital used in the latter program. In addition, he and Hefelmann processed the forms that doctors and midwives were required to submit in case of an abnormal birth and determined which newborns were ineligible to be killed under the program. He later worked with Viktor Brack on the adult "euthanasia" program and, after Hitler ordered it stopped in 1941, they both provided their expertise in starting up the program to gas the Jews in the concentration camps.

At the end of the war, Hegener took refuge together with Hefelmann in Stadtroda, in Thuringia, where the records concerning the child "euthanasia" program were also taken to be destroyed. He worked first in agriculture and later for a timber processing company. Under the slightly altered name of Richard Wegener, he obtained a position at the Ministry of Commerce and Transportation in Mecklenburg.

Arrested in 1951, Hegener was sentenced on 14 July 1952 by the Magdeburg State Court to life in prison for crimes against humanity. However, after serving four years of his sentence, he was released in July 1956 under a so-called ministerial decision. He then moved from East Germany to the West. He remained in contact with his former supervisor, Hefelmann, and obtained a sales position at Deutsche Werft in Hamburg through Dietrich Allers, who was advising the company legally and had formerly headed the central office at Action T4.

Hegener was interrogated beginning in 1960, and gave evidence at the trials of Franz Hofer, the former Gauleiter of Tyrol-Vorarlberg, in the early 1960s, of Hefelmann in 1964, and of Allers in 1968.

He died in Altona, Hamburg, in 1981.
