= Werner Catel =

German eugenicist (1894–1981)

- Born: June 27, 1894; Mannheim, Grand Duchy of Baden, German Empire
- Died: April 30, 1981 (aged 86); Kiel, West Germany
- Employer(s): University of Leipzig, University of Kiel, Action T4
- Known for: Child euthanasia programme during World War II, Action T4

Werner Catel (27 June 1894 – 30 April 1981), Professor of Pediatrics at the University of Leipzig, was one of three doctors considered an expert on the programme of euthanasia for children and participated in the Action T4 "euthanasia" programme for the Nazis, the other two being Hans Heinze and Ernst Wentzler.

== Action T4 ==
In early 1939, a farm labourer called Richard Kretschmar requested Catel's permission to euthanise one of his children, now identified as Gerhard Kretschmar, who had been born blind and deformed. Catel deferred the matter and suggested the father write directly to Hitler for permission. Hitler subsequently sent Dr. Karl Brandt to confer with Catel and decide on a course of action. On July 25, 1939 the child was killed.

The T4 program was influenced by a popular book, Allowing the destruction of life unworthy of living, written in 1920 by Alfred Hoche and Karl Binding. Catel, as part of this programme, was probably influenced by it too. In his 1962 publication, Grenzsituation des Lebens (Border situations of life), Catel argued for the reintroduction of euthanasia. As had Binding and Hoche, Catel identified three possible types of euthanasia.

- Reine Euthanasie:

"Real" euthanasia was seen as the killing of a person who was suffering from so much pain, that an ever-increasing amount of pain-reducing drugs had to be administered. This consequently led to the person's death.

- Euthanasie im engeren Sinne:

The killing of a patient whose illness "according to medical experience" is so bad "that there is no hope of recovery", but whose death is also not to be expected in the near future. (See terminal sedation)

- Euthanasie im weiteren Sinne:

The "extermination of the life of an "idiot child" or an adult in a similar condition. Catel defined "idiot children" as being "such monsters ... which are nothing but a massa carnis".

== Postwar career ==
After the war Catel took charge of the Mammolshöhe Children's Mental Home near Kronberg, where he continued to rally for the euthanasia of children deemed beyond hope. In 1949 he was found to have committed no grave crimes by a denazification board in Hamburg, and became attached to the University of Kiel in 1954. There was serious discussion after his death in 1981 of establishing a Werner Catel Foundation with $200,000 from his estate, but the idea was finally dismissed in 1984.

A 2024 investigation of Mammolshöhe by the Hesse State Welfare Association (Landeswohlfahrtsverband Hessen) found that Catel used his position to illegally experiment on children. In particular, he tested the tuberculosis drug thioacetazone on them despite knowing that the drug had severe side effects on children. At least four children died as the result of his experiments. In addition, Catel recruited former colleagues from the Leipzig euthanasia program to Mammolshöhe, and investigations into his work were obstructed by other doctors, pharmaceutical companies and the medical bureaucracy.

== See also ==
- Alfred Hoche
- Karl Binding
- Life unworthy of life
