= Heinrich Gross =

Austrian physician (1915–2005)

Heinrich Gross (14 November 1915 – 15 December 2005) was an Austrian psychiatrist, medical doctor and neurologist, a reputed expert as a leading court-appointed psychiatrist, known for his proven involvement in the killing of at least nine children with physical, mental and/or emotional/behavioral characteristics considered "unclean" by the Nazi regime, under its Euthanasia Program. His role in hundreds of other cases of infanticide is unclear. Gross was head of the Spiegelgrund children's psychiatric clinic for two years during World War II.

A significant element of the controversy surrounding Gross' activities is that after the children had been murdered, parts of their bodies, particularly their brains, were preserved and retained for future study for decades after the murders. It was only on 28 April 2002 that the preserved remains of these murdered children were finally buried.

== Youth and education ==
Heinrich Gross was born in Vienna on 14 November 1915. His parents, Karl and Petronella Gross, were in the wool and knitwear business. His father died before Heinrich was born and his mother placed him in a Catholic boarding school for his early education. He graduated from a public high school in 1934 and received a medical degree in 1939 from the University of Vienna.

In 1932, Gross became a member of the Hitler Youth and joined the Sturmabteilung in 1934. He remained a member throughout the period 1934 to 1938 when these organizations were outlawed in Austria. After Germany annexed Austria in 1938, Gross joined the Nazi Party.

== Euthanasia program ==
Euthanasia was commonly practiced long before the infamous Nazi concentration camps. The euthanasia program was introduced to the German people as an efficient manner to obtain a Master Race for the Nazi people and an economic relief to families. As Nazi popularity grew and the economy still struggled, these options were widely accepted by the German people. Am Spiegelgrund was a youth care facility on the grounds of a mental institution. From the years of 1940 to 1945 it was used for mentally handicapped adults or children. During their stay they suffered numerous forms of torture and up to 800 people were murdered there. Gross began in pavilion 15 in November 1940. By 1942 he had killed more children than any other doctor in the hospital. He became the leading psychiatrist and began studying the neurology of mentally handicapped children. With the passing of Aktion T4 the killings increased and Gross began to harvest the brains of his victims for further study. In 1943 Gross was called for military service, returning fairly regularly for research until his capture in 1945. Gross was held in Soviet custody from 1945 to December 1947. After his release, Gross was arrested by Austrian authorities and put on trial for his involvement in the murder of a child. In March 1950, he was convicted of being an accessory to manslaughter and sentenced to two years in prison. Gross was released from prison on 1 April 1950. His conviction was overturned in 1951.

== Post-war career ==
In the same year of his overturned manslaughter case, Gross was allowed to resume his research at Rosenhügel. In 1955, he completed his training as a specialist in nervous and mental diseases and became the head prison doctor or physician in the former Hospital and nursing home Am Steinhof. In 1957 he became the Chief court psychiatrist for men's mental institutions. There he worked with the justice system in insanity cases and was the main decision maker in all sterilization cases as well. He got promoted to the management of the "Ludwig Boltzmann Institute for the study of the abnormalities of the nervous system" created specially for him in 1968. Gross worked as a reviewer and for years was considered the most busy court expert in Austria. In 1975 the Republic of Austria awarded him the medal für Wissenschaft und Kunst 1, of which he was stripped in 2003.

In 1975, it was realized that he had been involved in illegal killings during the Nazi occupation of Austria. Gross was stripped of many awards but continued serving as a court expert until he came under investigation in 1997 for nine counts of murder.

== Trial ==
Gross was placed on trial for atrocities in 1999; however, the trial was suspended in 2000 due to his dementia and Parkinson's disease. Gross died on 15 December 2005 aged 90.
