= Am Spiegelgrund clinic =

Nazi euthanasia facility in Austria

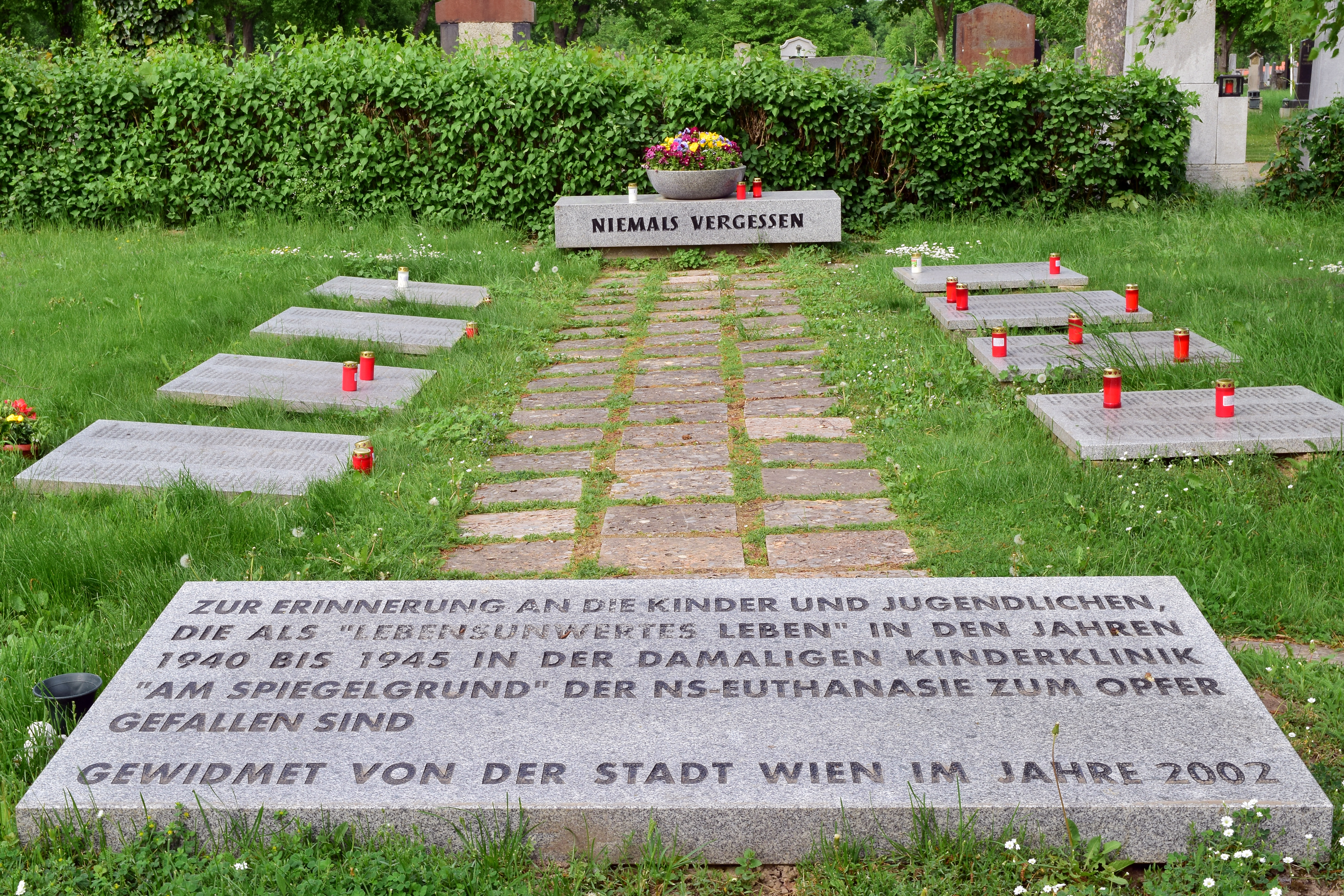
Grave-site of the murdered children at Vienna Central Cemetery. The upper stone block reads (in German) "Never forgotten" and the lower stone block reads (in German) "In memory of the children and adolescents, who fell victim to NS euthanasia as 'life unworthy of life' from 1940 to 1945 in the former children's hospital 'Am Spiegelgrund'. Dedicated by the City of Vienna in 2002". NS is short for NSDAP, i.e. the Nazi Party.

Am Spiegelgrund was a children's clinic in Vienna where 789 patients were murdered under the Nazi program of child euthanasia. The clinic was established in 1940, and operated out of Am Steinhof psychiatric hospital buildings emptied by Aktion T4. It was closed in 1945, after the liberation of Vienna.

At Am Spiegelgrund, sick and disabled children and adolescents were subjected to unethical human experimentation and medical neglect, as well as physical and psychological abuse. Some died by lethal injection and gas poisoning; others by disease, starvation, exposure to the elements, and "accidents" relating to their conditions. The brains of up to 800 victims were preserved in jars and housed in the hospital for decades. In 1942, the clinic was divided into the Vienna Municipal Mental Clinic for Children "Am Spiegelgrund" and the Vienna Municipal Reformatory "Am Spiegelgrund". Children and adolescents committed to the reformatory were also physically and psychologically abused.

The clinic has gained contemporary notoriety, due in part to the treatment of children by lead psychiatrist Heinrich Gross. Gross was responsible for the deaths of at least nine "defective" children, but may have played a major role in the killing of hundreds more, and preserved many dead children as medical specimens. Gross went unpunished for his actions after the end of World War II and became a court psychiatrist in Austria, with much of what he did only becoming public knowledge very late in his life. The clinic is also today known because of the children referred to it by Austrian psychiatrist Hans Asperger, whose possible role in the patient selection process in the Children's Ward came to light in the 2010s, making him a highly controversial figure in recent years. However, a 2024 analysis by Klaus Schepker and Christine Freitag, based on the examination of patient medical records and transfers, concluded that Hans Asperger did not violate professional medical ethics during the Nazi period, did not participate in or recommend child euthanasia, and that fatal decisions were made by other physicians responsible for patient transfers and reporting.

== Background ==
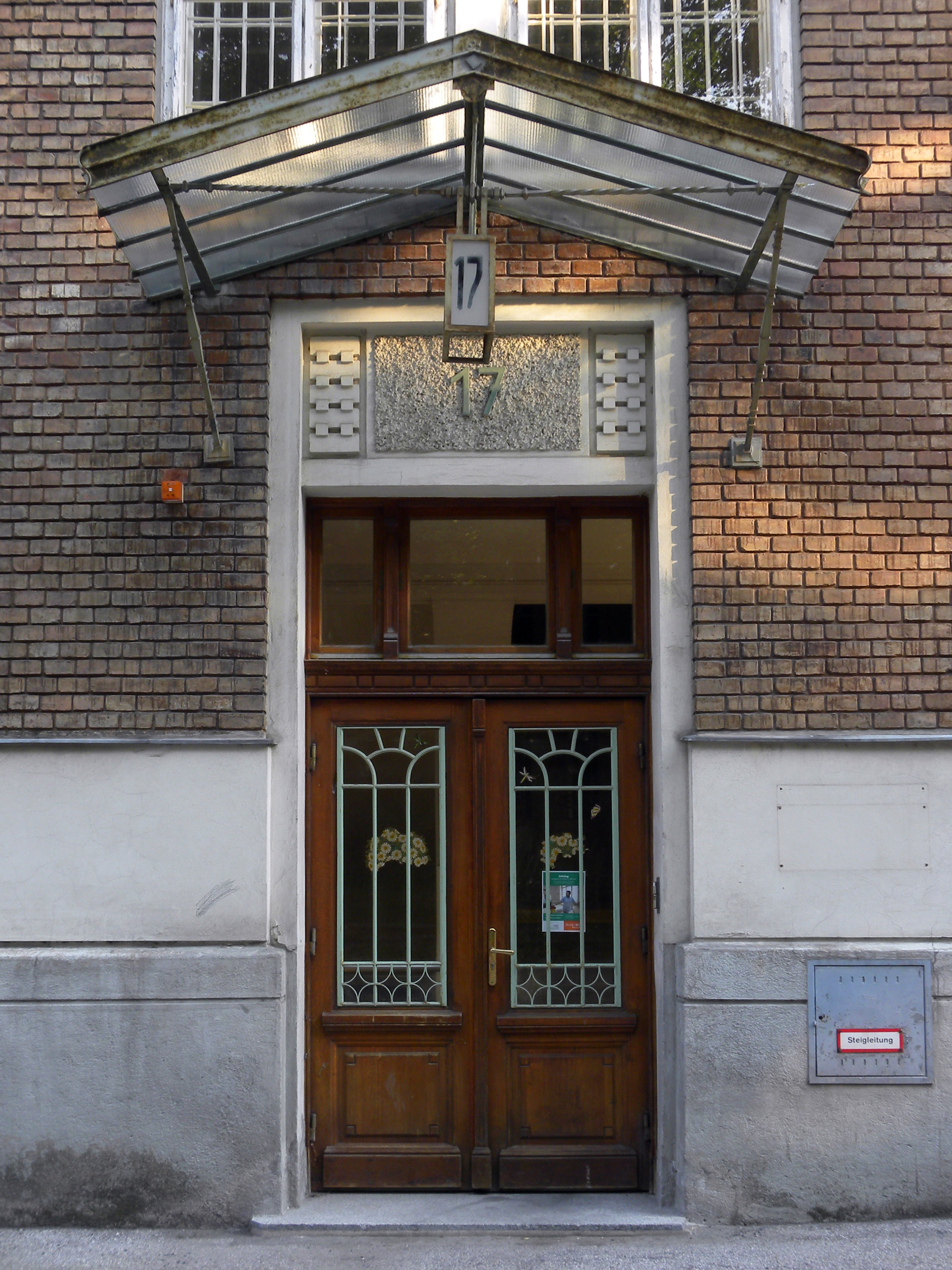
Entrance to Pavilion 17

Beginning in the spring of 1938, an extensive network of facilities was established for the documentation, observation, evaluation and selection of children and adolescents, whose social behavior, disabilities, and/or parentage did not comply with the Nazi ideology. The recording of these individuals often began in infancy. Doctors and midwives across the Reich reported mental and physical abnormalities in newborns and children to health authorities. In 1941 in Vienna, seventy-two percent of newborns were documented within their first year of life by the city's more than 100 maternity clinics. Anyone who came into contact with a health institution was systematically recorded into a "hereditary database" which included the patient's genetic information. Over 700,000 Viennese citizens were entered into this database. Genetic information was compounded with school assessments and with employer information and criminal records, when applicable.

Many within Vienna's healthcare system adhered to Nazi eugenics, and patients of all ages were funneled into specialized facilities, in which many patients were mistreated and killed. Throughout Germany and Austria, euthanasia centers were established, including Hadamar Euthanasia Centre and Hartheim Euthanasia Centre, for people with mental or physical disabilities. Children were not spared. Many children were "mercifully" sent to children's hospitals, and among the most prominent of these was the Kinderspital (Children's Clinic) Am Spiegelgrund in Vienna. Among the patients were those deemed "life unworthy of life". As part of the Steinhof psychiatric complex the Spiegelgrund clinic housed state sponsored pediatric euthanasia. Around 789 children died in the Spiegelgrund clinic while the Steinhof complex was responsible for the death of around 7,500 patients by the end of World War II. The clinic operated under the direction of the Führer's Chancellery and Ministry of the Interior where physicians conducted "all manner" of procedures on the vulnerable and disabled children which were often fatal. The Am Steinhof psychiatric hospital was established in the early 1900s, but from July 1940 to April 1945 it housed the Spiegelgrund Clinic. On 16 March 1945, the 2nd Ukrainian and 3rd Ukrainian fronts launched the Vienna offensive in an effort to take the city from Nazi forces. After a month of fighting, the Red Army captured Vienna. The liberation of Vienna by Soviet forces in the spring of 1945 resulted in the end of the Spiegelgrund clinic.

== Aktion T4 and the children's ward ==
The establishment of a children's ward at the Am Steinhof facility was not possible until the implementation of Aktion T4, a product of the Euthanasia Letter signed by Adolf Hitler. This called for the relocation of approximately 3,200 patients, or about two thirds of the patient population at the time, in July 1940. The order subsequently emptied many of the "pavilions", or buildings, within the grounds. The patients were taken, sometimes after a brief transfer to the institutions of Niedernhart bei Linz or Ybbs an der Donau, to the Hartheim Euthanasia Centre, near Linz. It is likely that Am Steinhof served as a transfer point for patients of other institutions, as well. The gassing of patients at Hartheim began in May 1940; by the end of the summer of 1940, the 3,200 patients from Am Steinhof were systematically brought to the centre.

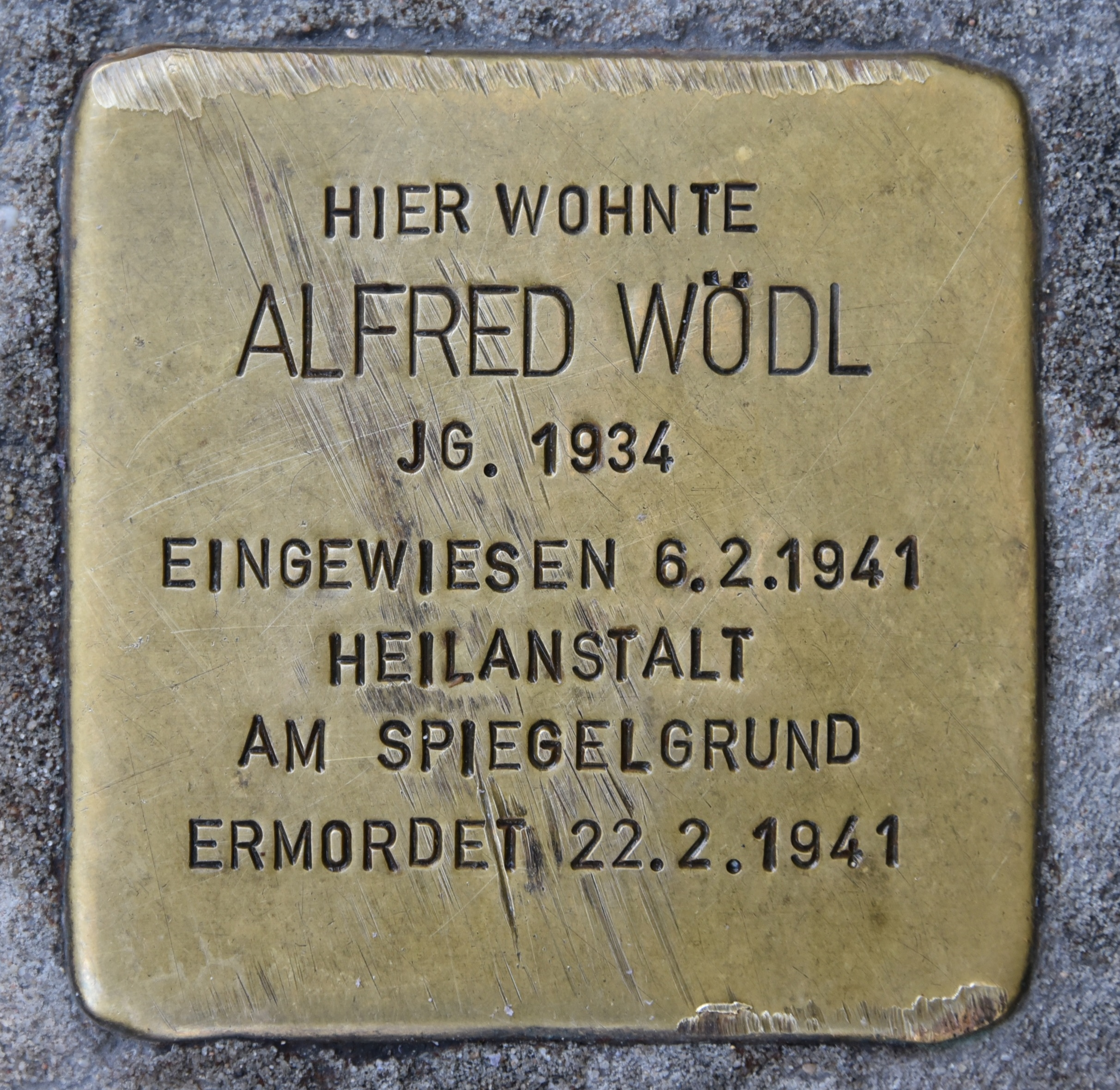
Stolperstein (memorial pavement-block) for Alfred Wödl, who was murdered at the clinic

Both the patient selection process and the implementation of the action were carried out by the Commission of Berlin, assembled by Werner Heyde. The institutions themselves were informed only that large-scale transfers were necessary "for the defense of the Reich".

On 24 July, just weeks after the transfers began, the children's clinic, Am Spiegelgrund, opened its doors with room for six hundred and forty patients in nine buildings on the grounds. The curative education or special needs department of the Central Children's Home was relocated to Spiegelgrund, along with the department's so-called School Children Observation Centre. This is where children were evaluated to determine their educability.

Educability became a part of the patient selection process. Some of the children arrived perfectly healthy, in both mind and body, but were brought to the center due to delinquent behavior, poor upbringing, or unsuitable parentage. They were considered delinquents if they had run away from home or resorted to petty crimes; they were considered inferior if they were born out of wedlock or came from impoverished homes; they were considered "defective" if their parents were alcoholics or criminals. These educable children were not exempt from experimentation and punishment at the hands of their caretakers, since they were often seen as a burden on society. In this way, "the child euthanasia program came to medicalize social belonging, incorporating social concerns as eugenicist criteria."

Known officially as the Infant Centre, Building 15 was designated as a Children's Ward, the second of its kind in the Reich after Brandenburg an der Havel. The ward would report any supposed genetic or contagious diseases to the central healthcare office in Vienna, which would determine if "treatment" were necessary.

Patient records were evaluated by professionals to determine whether a patient should be euthanized, allowed to live, or observed pending a final decision. One preserved example of the evaluation records belonged to an adult patient, "Klara B.", institutionalized at Steinhof, who was among the 3,200 patients evicted in the summer of 1940. Highlighted in red pen are the terms Jew (German: Jüdin) and her diagnosis of schizophrenia. The red "+"s on the bottom left of her form mark her for euthanasia. She was transferred from the Vienna facility to Hartheim, where she was gassed on 8 August 1940, at the age of 31. She and other institutionalized Jews faced unfavorable odds. Of the approximately 3,200 patients, around 400, or 12.5%, were Jewish, when the Jewish community constituted just 2.8% of Austria's national population in 1933.

Those who remained behind or who were later brought to Am Steinhof were in no less danger than those who were removed. The death rates among patients at Am Steinhof increased annually between 1936 and 1945, from 6.54% to 42.76%, respectively. As the death rate climbed, the patient population naturally decreased. In 1936, there were 516 reported deaths; in 1945, there were approximately 2300.

Despite the regime's attempts to keep Aktion T4 a secret, the public was in some measure aware of increasing death rates among the institutionalized patients. In July 1940, Anna Wödl, a nurse and the mother of a disabled child, led a protest movement against the evacuation and murder of institutionalized children. Family members and supporters sent many letters to high-ranking officials in Berlin. They also protested outside institutions, but police and the SS soon put an end to the demonstrations. The Austrian Communist Party, the Catholic and Protestant Churches and others formally condemned the killings, and on 24 August 1941, Hitler was pressured to abolish Aktion T4. The abolition, however, did not stop the murders. Other child euthanasia programs, particularly Action 14f13, quickly and quietly took its place. Anna Wödl's protests proved to be in vain; while her son, Alfred Wödl, was spared a transfer to Hartheim, he was murdered in the Children's Ward at Am Spiegelgrund on 22 February 1941, with the official cause of death being listed as "pneumonia". His brain was kept for research and housed in the hospital until 2001, when his remains were finally laid to rest.

== Experimentation and child euthanasia ==
Although Nazi leadership lacked scientific training, they sought legitimacy from science and biology to justify eugenics and ethnic cleansing. Nazis coined several terms for those they deemed unfit; for example, the terms Lebensunwertes Leben, which translates to 'life unworthy of life'; unnütze Esser, meaning 'useless eater'; and Ballastexistenzen, which means 'ballast lives'. To strengthen the Nazi regime and Germany as a whole, utilizing euthanasia to select against individuals who would not produce strong and productive offspring was seen as a merciful gesture.

The children who were sent to euthanasia centers such as Am Spiegelgrund were selected on the basis of medical questionnaires. Physicians were told to report children with conditions such as intellectual disability, cerebral palsy, Down syndrome, any deformities, bed wetting, learning disabilities, along with many other things that would lower their ability to strengthen Hitler's superior race. If a child had any sort of mental or physical condition, their questionnaire would be sent to Hitler's Chancellery, who would recommend "special treatment" despite having never met the children. The victims of Am Spiegelgrund were subjected to torture-like experimental treatments as well as punishments for a variety of offenses. Survivors Johann Gross, Alois Kaufmann, and Friedrich Zawrel described and testified to several of the "treatments", which included electroshock therapy, a so-called "cold water cure" in which Zawrel and Kaufmann recall being repeatedly submerged into freezing bath water until they were blue and barely conscious and had lost control of their bowels; a "sulfur cure", which was an injection that caused severe pain in the legs, limiting mobility and ensuring that escape was impossible; spinal injections of apomorphine; injections of phenobarbital; overdoses of sedatives, which would often lead to death when the children were exposed to extreme cold or disease; observed starvation; and efficacy testing of tuberculosis vaccines, for which children were infected with tuberculosis pathogens.

Many patients who had been deemed seriously disabled died under mysterious circumstances. Upon inquiry, the hospital staff would blame pneumonia or a fatal muscle conniption caused by the mental state of the patient. In reality, the children were being killed via lethal injection, neglect and disease. Alois Kaufmann, a victim of Am Spiegelgrund, compared the Nazi's approach to child euthanasia to a predator-prey relationship. According to Kaufmann, every two to three weeks, the weakest children would be plucked from the group, never to be seen again. The children who were picked first were "the bedwetters or harelips or slow thinkers".

The children who were killed at Am Spiegelgrund often died by overdose of depressants such as morphine, scopolamine, and barbiturates, gassing by carbon monoxide, which was a common Nazi tactic, exposure, and starvation. Once the children died, fake death certificates were fabricated, and the victim's families still had to pay a fee for the special treatment they believed their children were receiving during their time at Am Spiegelgrund. After death, the bodies were subjected to medical experiments. Brains and other body parts were removed, placed in formaldehyde jars or sealed in paraffin wax, to be stored secretly in the basement for "research".

In 2002, the last two victims out of the 800 children murdered at Am Spiegelgrund were laid to rest. The remains of Annemarie Tanner, who was four at her time of death, and Gerhard Zehetner, who was 18 months at the time of his death, were buried in the section of the cemetery dedicated to victims of National Socialism. Tanner and Zehtner were murdered as they were seen to be "unfit" by the Nazis.

Heinrich Gross was the head of the psychiatric clinic during the war and he was thought to have had a hand in the deaths of Tanner and Zehtner. Allegedly, he injected children with cleft lips, stutters, and learning disabilities with drugs that caused lung infections. He then left these "unworthy" children outside to die. Although he admitted to knowing about the killings, he denied any personal involvement. It was Dr. Werner Vogt, a physician, who accused Dr. Gross of gross malpractice at the Am Spiegelgrund clinic in 1979.

== Known victims ==
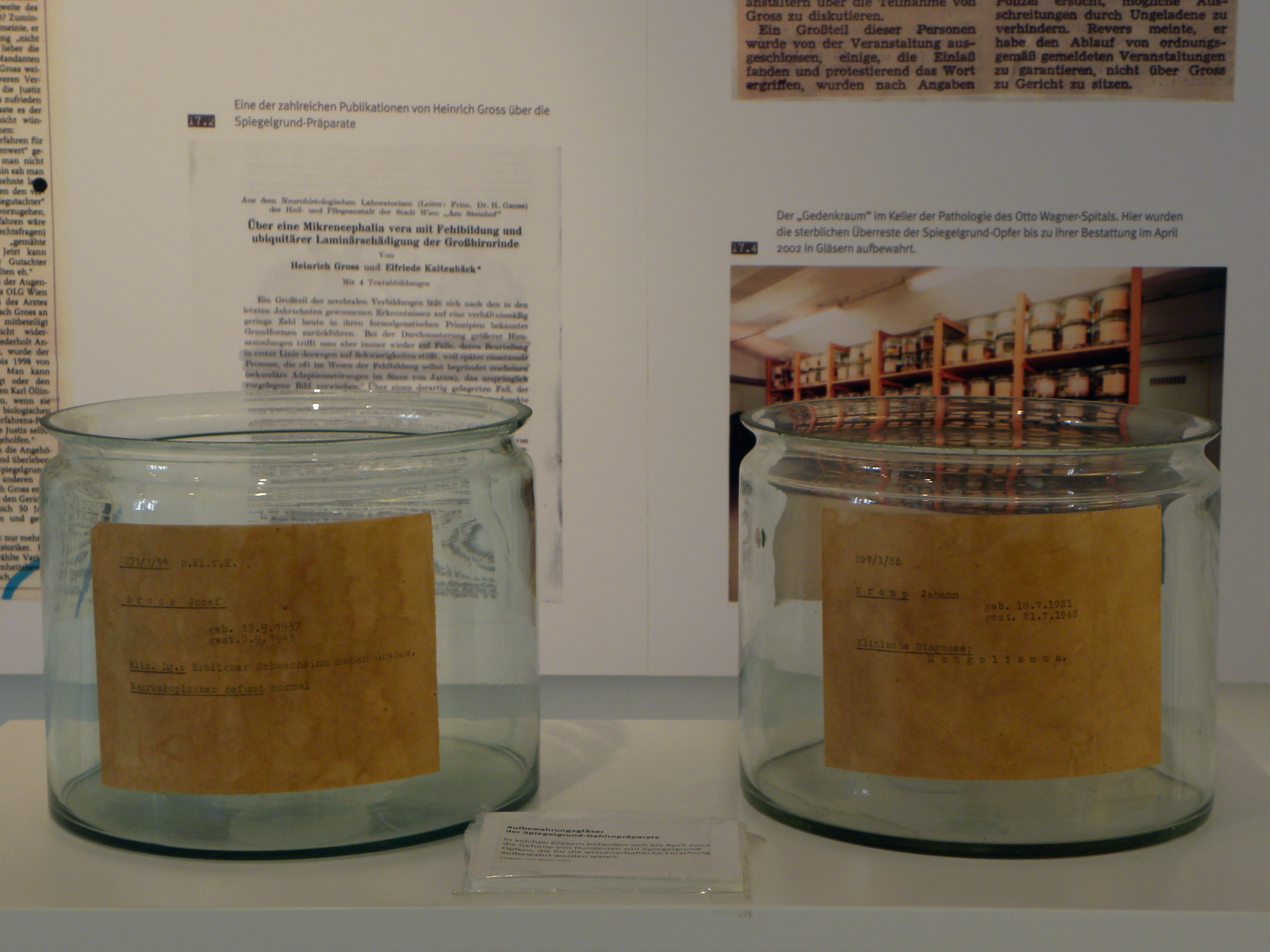
The brains of euthanasia victims were stored in glass jars labelled with the victim's name, birth and death dates, and clinical diagnosis.

- Gerhard Zehetner: A male patient admitted to Am Spiegelgrund on 10 October 1942, who subsequently died on 12 December 1943. His brain was found in a glass storage jar in the clinic basement; the jar was labeled "idiocy".
- Irma Sperling: A three-year-old girl who had learning difficulties and was possibly autistic. She was listed to have a flat head, obvious facial bulges, and a thick jaw. Sperling was declared an idiot by the clinic. Her family received notice of her death in 1945 along with the cost of care receipt.
- Annemarie Tanner: A young girl admitted to the clinic in 1943 who was treated by Gross for rickets. She died 15 months later at the age of four, and was said to have been poisoned. Tanner was dropped off at the Am Spiegelgrund clinic by her parents, who were unaware that her admittance to the clinic would result in her death. Tanner was later declared a victim of National Socialism.
- Alois Kauffmann: A male survivor of Am Spiegelgrund who was born out of wedlock in 1934 and given up by his mother at birth. He was admitted to Spiegelgrund in 1943 with syphilis, and was treated by Gross for 22 months. He later published a novel titled Hearses – Childhood in Spiegelgrund. Following the war, he investigated the crimes committed by the clinic.
- Rudolf Karger: A male patient admitted to Am Spiegelgrund on 1 September 1941, who would survive his stay there. Karger suffered severe abuse after an escape attempt, and later recalled that there was not a single day that went by without punishment.
- Friedrich Zawrel: A male patient sent to Am Spiegelgrund at the age of 11, Zawrel was a patient of Gross and a victim of various medical experiments and prolonged solitary confinement. Zawrel survived the clinic, and later described being tortured and humiliated by Gross. Zawrel received nauseating injections and attempted drownings by orderlies, and often went days without food or water. He was labeled a "hereditary defective" on account of his alcoholic father.

== Leading personnel ==
There were several people involved in the euthanasia practices occurring at Am Spiegelgrund Clinic. These people included Erwin Jekelius, Hans Bertha, Ernst Illing, Heinrich Gross, Margarethe Hübsch, and Marianne Türk. Their roles at the clinic differed as some were the director of the clinic and others were scientists directly involved in the murder of hundreds of children. Over time, some of these people left the clinic and new ones entered it. During World War II, Am Spiegelgrund clinic was led by Ernst Illing and for two years by Heinrich Gross.

The head of the institution from 24 July 1940 to January 1942 was Erwin Jekelius, who in October 1940 was one of 30 participants in a conference about "Euthanasia" laws, which were never put into effect. The T4 program also used him as an expert to decide the fate of institutionalized patients. Jekelius was known for his ruthlessness in selecting children for death and for his brutality in handing out corporal punishments to the children under his care. In September 1941, the Royal Air Force dropped pamphlets detailing his involvement in multiple murders at Spiegelgrund which eventually led to his removal as the director of the clinic. He was arrested by Soviet forces in 1945, and in 1948, he was sentenced in Moscow to 25 years of hard labor. He died of bladder cancer in a Soviet labor camp in May 1952.

Succeeding Jekelius and presiding over the institution for the next six months was Hans Bertha, who was significantly involved in the T4 campaign from its conception in 1940. Bertha was never tried for his crimes despite documented evidence that he was involved in the murders of patients at Spiegelgrund and his close association with Jekelius and other war criminals. Bertha also used the patient murders for his "scientific" progress. According to the Hartheim Euthanasia Centre doctor Georg Renno, Bertha was particularly interested in epilepsy cases. When epileptic patients were murdered at Hartheim, for example, their brains were removed and given to Bertha for his research. After the war, he had an illustrious academic career in Graz.

On 1 July 1942, Ernst Illing took over as medical director of Am Spiegelgrund. He previously worked as a senior physician in the first children's division at the national institution at Brandenburg-Görden, alongside Hans Heinze, infamous for his involvement in the euthanasia program. Illing maintained his position until April 1945. In 1946, he was found guilty of torture and abuse resulting in death for killing at least 250 children. Illing was sentenced to death and hanged later that year.

Heinrich Gross, a psychologist and neurologist trained by Hans Heinze, became the senior doctor of the Children's Ward in Pavilion 15 in 1940. At least half of all Spiegelgrund victims died under Gross' care. From July 1942 to the end of March 1943, he shared the responsibilities of the Children's Ward with Margarethe Hübsch and Marianne Türk. He was enlisted around then, but records indicate he had returned to the clinic by the summer of 1944. Gross experimented on both the living and the dead. He monitored behavior after "treatments" were administered and experimented on his victims' brains and spinal tissue, which were stored in formaldehyde in the basement. In 1950, Gross was brought to trial in Austria and convicted of manslaughter, though he never served his two-year sentence. Gross went on to become a highly successful speaker, expert witness and researcher, publishing 34 works between 1954 and 1978 based upon the experiments. He received an Honorary Cross for Science and Art in 1975, which was stripped in 2003. Nazi-era files uncovered in the mid-1990s reopened the case against Gross. The ensuing investigation provided compelling evidence of his involvement in the deaths of nine children, whose preserved remains contained traces of poison; however, by then, he was seen unfit to stand trial.

Margarethe Hübsch assisted Heinrich Gross when he was the senior doctor of the Children's Ward in Pavilion 15. She was tried for murder alongside Ernst Illing and Marianne Türk between 15 and 18 July 1946. Unlike Illing and Türk, Hübsch was acquitted and released for lack of evidence. The national newspaper article detailing the trial claims that further testimony strongly suggested that she at least was aware of the killings, even if she did not commit them herself.

Marianne Türk shared responsibilities of the Children's Ward with Heinrich Gross. During her trial, Türk confessed to "sometimes" giving injections, but she did not know the number of victims. She was sentenced to ten years in prison but initially served only two. She was granted probation for poor health in 1948 but resumed her sentence in 1952. After her release, she did not return to the medical field.

== Involvement of Hans Asperger ==
Hans Asperger, an Austrian pediatrician, evaluated several children referred to the Am Spiegelgrund clinic during World War II, including Herta and Elisabeth Schreiber, both affected by physical and cognitive delays following childhood illnesses. Herwig Czech examined the medical records and noted that Asperger’s name appeared on the reports of children sent to Am Spiegelgrund and that some reports were signed with the Nazi greeting "Heil Hitler", initiating the debate about his possible role in the patient selection process."

Further research By Ernst Tatzer, Werner Maleczek and Franz Waldhauser in 2022 concluded ″Our detailed investigation, aided by historians, and investigations by other authors, showed no clear evidence to support the allegation that Asperger knowingly or willingly participated in the National Socialist Child Euthanasia programme in Vienna. This investigation included thorough analyses of the records for all the patients he and colleagues referred to Am Spiegelgrund from the Therapeutic Pedagogy Unit of the University Children's Hospital in Vienna. This covered the period between 1939 and March 1943 when Asperger was drafted by the military.″

Klaus Schepker and Christine Freitag in 2024 conducted a detailed analysis of patient transfers and diagnoses. According to their study, Asperger did not violate professional medical ethics during the Nazi period, did not participate in or recommend child euthanasia, and the fatal decisions were made by other physicians responsible for patient transfers and reporting.

Herta Schreiber was assessed by Asperger with the diagnosis: "Severe personality disorder (post-encephalitic?): severe motor delay; erethic idiocy; epileptic seizures. The child is an unbearable burden for the mother, who has five healthy children to care for. Permanent hospitalization seems absolutely necessary." Later, the hospital physician, Wilhelm Schmidt, reported her to the Reich Committee for the Scientific Registration of Severe Hereditary and Congenital Diseases using the term "special treatment", a code for child euthanasia, and Herta was transferred to Am Spiegelgrund, where she died on September 2, 1941.

Elisabeth Schreiber received a diagnosis from Asperger of "erethic imbecility, probably post-encephalitic, salivation, ‘encephalitic’ affect, negativism, significant linguistic deficit (now beginning to speak slowly), with relatively better comprehension". The second diagnosis by the physicians responsible for her transfer noted that Elisabeth showed no improvement and could not say anything other than ‘mama’. This diagnosis resulted in her inclusion in the child euthanasia program and subsequently led to her death at Am Spiegelgrund.

== Burial site and memorial ==
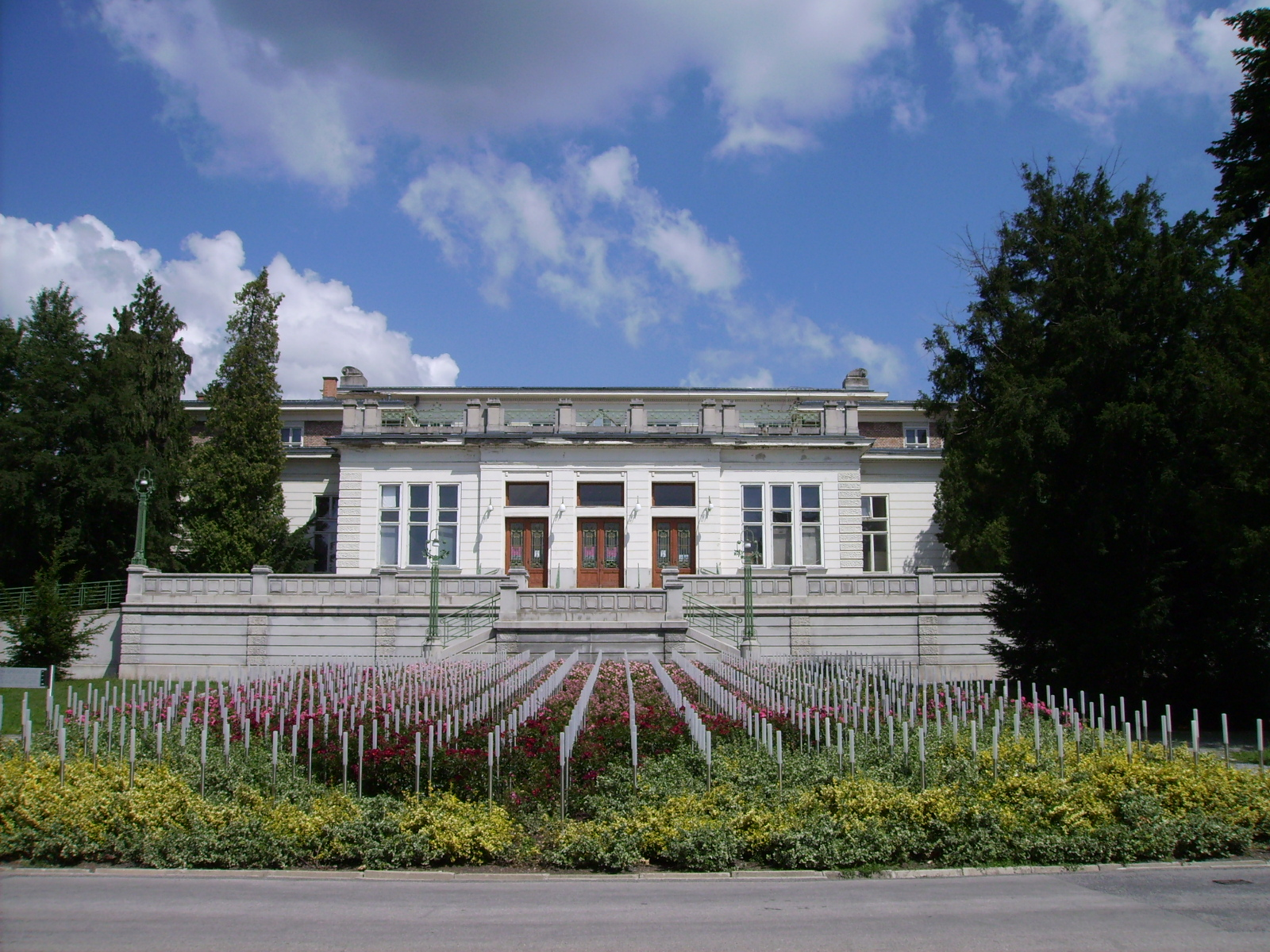
Otto Wagner. Am Steinhof 0088

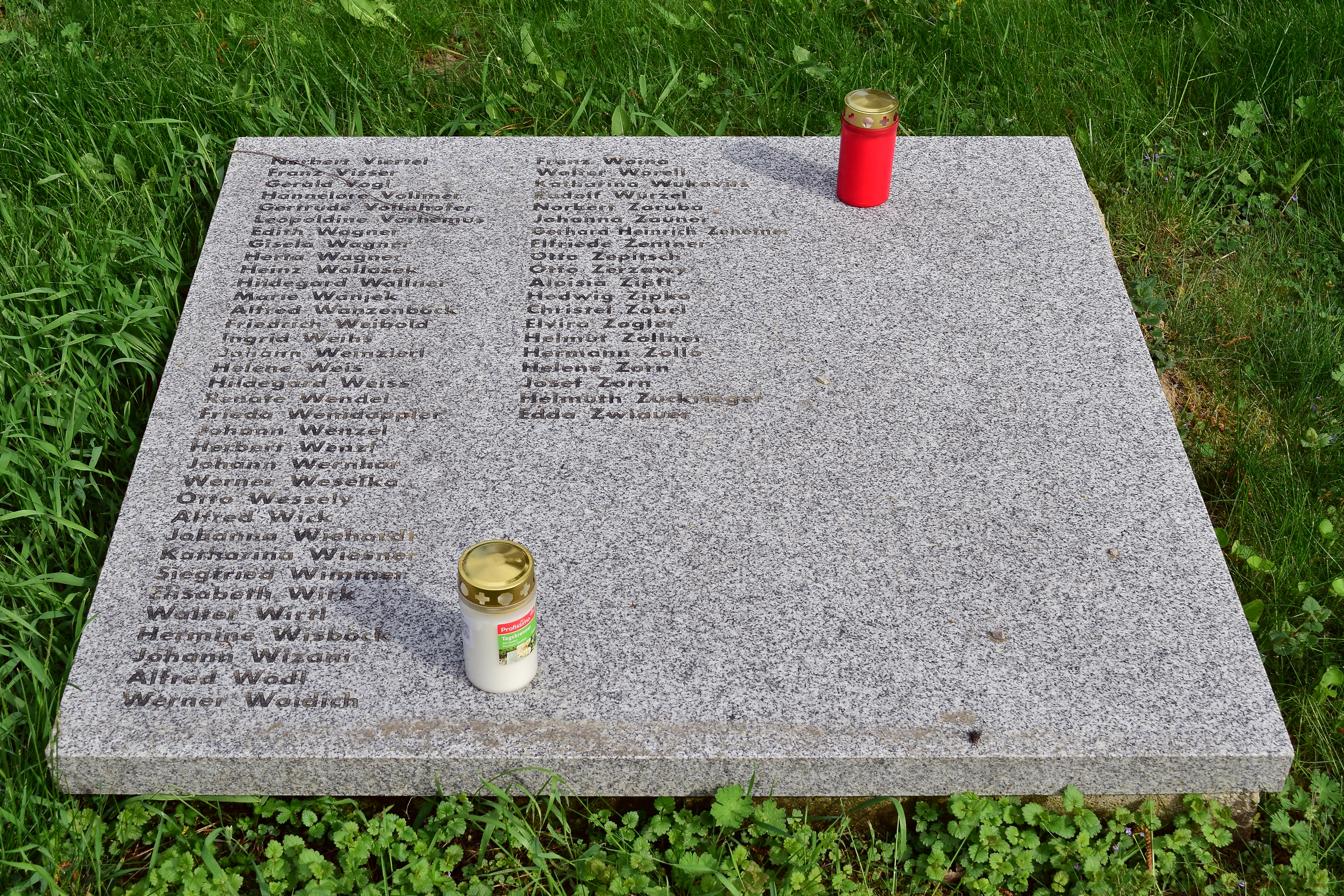
Vienna's Central Cemetery - Final Resting Place of the Victims of Spiegelgrund - Names Viertel to Zwiauer

In April 2002, six hundred urns containing the remains of children killed at Spiegelgrund were interred at Vienna's Central Cemetery in the section reserved for victims of the Nazi regime. Approximately three hundred mourners came to pay their respects at the funeral, and the names of all the children are inscribed onto eight stone slabs, accompanied by a stone bench and bowl of flowers. Detailed coverage of the burial ceremony, as well as full background are told in the 2004 documentary film Gray Matter.

Among those laid here were: Gerhard Zehetner, 18 months old; Irma Sperling, aged 3, from Hamburg; Annemarie Tanner, aged 4, who was admitted for rickets in 1941 and lost twenty-five percent of her body weight within six months. A photo of the child, taken by Gross, shows her naked on a sheet. Tanner's older sister, Waltraud Häupl, became an outspoken supporter of a memorial when she discovered her sister's remains in 1999; Felix Janauschek, aged 16, was diagnosed with cerebral palsy. He contracted influenza in March 1943 and was left outside on the balcony of the ward until his condition worsened. His official cause of death was pneumonia.

The site now contains multiple exhibits about the euthanasia program and memorials to the victims. A permanent memorial was erected on the site in 2002, and since November 2003, has included 772 lighted poles, whose arrangement was designed by Tanja Walter. A plaque nearby states that the strict arrangement of the lighted stelae reflects the "situation of the children, held hostage and deprived of their freedom".
