= Hans Heinze =

German psychiatrist and eugenicist

Hans Heinze, sometimes referred to as Euthanasie-Heinze ("Euthanasia Heinze"; 18 October 1895 – 4 February 1983), was a Nazi German psychiatrist and eugenicist.

== Life ==
Heinze was born in Elsterberg, the 13th of 14 children, and was educated at Grimma. After service as a medical orderly during World War I Heinze studied medicine and trained as a psychiatrist at Leipzig, where he worked from 1924 in child psychiatry. He was later appointed director of the child psychiatry department of the University Clinic in Berlin, and also, in 1934, director of the Landesheilanstalt in Potsdam, holding the two posts simultaneously. On 2 October 1939 he was appointed Dozent for neurology and psychiatry in the medical faculty of Berlin University, where on 6 April 1943 he became a professor.

In November 1938 Heinze took over the direction of the Landesanstalt Brandenburg-Görden otherwise Landes-Pflegeanstalt Brandenburg an der Havel, a mental institution at Brandenburg an der Havel, housed in the old Brandenburg an der Havel Prison, commonly now referred to as the Brandenburg Euthanasia Centre, with about 2,500 patients, 1,000 of them children. Here he supervised the murder by injection, starvation and poisoning of thousands of children whose brains he then supplied to Nazi researchers. He also trained physicians for the T4 Euthanasia Programme.

After the war Heinze remained in post at Brandenburg-Görden. The Russians were interested in some of his work and offered him the direction of an institution in the Crimea, but when he turned this down, tried him for crimes against humanity for approving "the measures of a fascist government and as a university professor trained fascists instead of medics." Heinze was found guilty on 14 March 1946 sentenced to 7 years in prison. He served most of his sentence in the Soviet Special Camp No. 7 at Sachsenhausen, where he worked as the camp doctor.

Heinze was released from prison on 14 March 1952 and declined offers of senior medical posts in the Volkspolizei and at the University of Jena in order to return to his family in West Germany. He took up the directorship of the department of child and adolescent psychiatry in the hospital of Wunstorf in Lower Saxony, where he remained until his retirement, and where he died in 1983.

== German judicial investigation ==
In 1962 the legal authorities of Lower Saxony opened a preliminary investigation into Heinze, but the proceedings were halted after Heinze, represented by the lawyer Kurt Giese (formerly a senior lawyer in the Private Chancellery of the Führer), was declared psychologically unfit for the process.

== Rehabilitation ==
In 1997 Dr Klaus-Dieter Müller, a German historian seeking research material, approached the Russian military authorities for their files on Heinze, which he was only able to obtain by entering a request for Heinze's rehabilitation (a recognition by the Russian authorities of his innocence of the crimes for which he had been imprisoned). As a result of Müller's request the Russian military legal service reviewed Heinze's case and in 1998 declared him rehabilitated. This caused considerable discussion in Germany of the extent to which historians should take responsibility for the consequences of their researches.

== Publications ==
- Veränderungen des Liquor cerebrospinalis und ihre Bedeutung für die Auffassung vom Wesen des Ischias, Leipzig 1923
- Kindliche Charaktere und ihre Abartigkeiten, Paul Schröder with explanatory case studies by Hans Heinze, Breslau 1931
- Zur Phänomenologie des Gemüts, Berlin 1932
- Die Entstehung und Funktion des intervillösen Raumes, Halle 1933
- Rasse und Erbe: Ein Wegweiser auf dem Gebiet der Rassenkunde, Vererbungslehre und Erbgesundheitspflege für den Gebrauch an Volks- und Mittelschulen, Halle 1934
- "Zirkuläres Irresein (manisch-depressives): Psychopathologische Persönlichkeiten", Handbuch der Erbkrankheiten ("Handbook of Hereditary Illnesses"), ed. Arthur Julius Gütt, Vol. 4, revised by Hans Heinze et al., Thieme, Leipzig 1942
- Ein Geschwisterpaar mit Myoklonusepilepsie, Bonn 1955

== See also ==
- Euthanasia
- Ernst Illing
- Am Spiegelgrund clinic

== Bibliography ==
- Götz Aly (ed.): Aktion T4. 1939–1945. Die "Euthanasie"-Zentrale in der Tiergartenstraße 4. 2nd expanded edition. Edition Hentrich, Berlin 1989, ISBN 3-926175-66-4 (Reihe deutsche Vergangenheit. Stätten der Geschichte Berlins 26), (exhibition catalogue)
- Henry Friedlander: Der Weg zum NS-Genozid. Von der Euthanasie zur Endlösung. Berlin, Berlin-Verlag 1997, ISBN 3-8270-0265-6
- Ernst Klee: Dokumente zur "Euthanasie". Fischer-Taschenbuch-Verlag, Frankfurt am Main 1985, ISBN 3-596-24327-0 (Fischer-Taschenbücher. 4327)
- Ernst Klee: "Euthanasie" im NS-Staat. Die "Vernichtung lebensunwerten Lebens". 11th edition. Fischer-Taschenbuch-Verlag, Frankfurt am Main 2004, ISBN 3-596-24326-2 (Fischer-Taschenbücher. 4326 Die Zeit des Nationalsozialismus)
- Ernst Klee: Hans Heinze. In: Ernst Klee: Das Personenlexikon zum Dritten Reich. Wer war was vor und nach 1945. (updated edition). Fischer-Taschenbuch-Verlag, Frankfurt am Main 2005, ISBN 3-596-16048-0, p. 43 (Fischer 16048)
- Ernst Klee: Was sie taten – was sie wurden. Ärzte, Juristen und andere Beteiligte am Kranken- oder Judenmord. 12th edition. Fischer-Taschenbuch-Verlag, Frankfurt am Main 2004, ISBN 3-596-24364-5 (Fischer-Taschenbücher. 4364 Die Zeit des Nationalsozialismus)
- Ernst Klee: Verschonte Medizinverbrecher. Die Professoren Heinze und Hallervorden. In: Dachauer Hefte. 13, 1997, ISSN 0257-9472, pp. 143–152
- Alexander Mitscherlich, Fred Mielke (ed.): Medizin ohne Menschlichkeit. Dokumente des Nürnberger Ärzteprozesse (new edition). Fischer-Taschenbuch-Verlag, Frankfurt am Main 1987, ISBN 3-596-22003-3 (Fischer-Taschenbücher 2003)
- "Warum ein Nazi-Massenmörder rehabilitiert wurde". Spiegel Online. August 24, 2004.
- Manfred Müller-Küppers: Die Geschichte der Kinder- und Jugendpsychiatrie unter besonderer Berücksichtigung der Zeit des Nationalsozialismus in: Forum der Kinder- und Jugendpsychiatrie und Psychotherapie Heft 2, 2001
- Hans-Walter Schmuhl: "Hirnforschung und Krankenmord. Das Kaiser-Wilhelm-Institut für Hirnforschung 1937 - 1945 (PDF; 243 kB)" Series: Ergebnisse, 1. Stand 2000
- dsb.: Medizin in der NS-Zeit: Hirnforschung und Krankenmord in: Deutsches Ärzteblatt 2001; Year 98. A 1240–1245, Heft 19
