= Steinhof (Vienna) =

Coordinates: 48°12′31″N 16°16′47″E

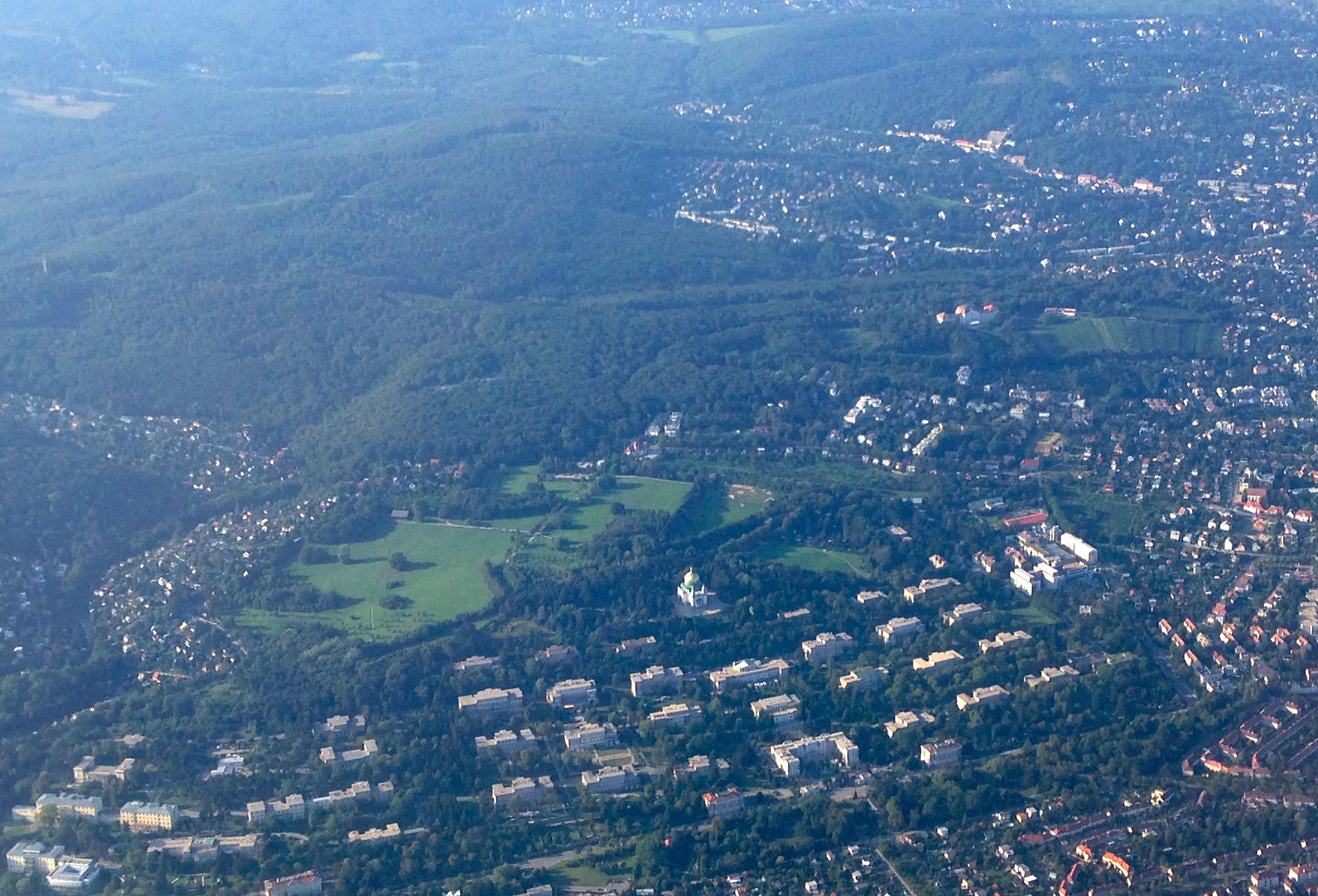
Aerial view of the hospital and church and the surrounding park area of Steinhof in the lower half of the picture

Steinhof in Vienna, Austria, is an old name for an area of Vienna that today contains the Otto-Wagner-Spital as well as its church Kirche am Steinhof and the surrounding parks of the Steinhofgründe, which were opened in 1907. Historically the area is also linked to the Am Spiegelgrund clinic, where 789 patients, mostly children, were murdered during World War II under the child euthanasia in Nazi Germany from 1940 to 1945.

The name derives from the quarries of nearby Ottakring, which were called Steinhöfe (English: stone yards). The area used to belong to Lower Austria, but was assigned to the 14th district of Vienna, Penzing, after the Anschluss of Austria to Nazi Germany in 1938.
