= List of hospitals in Austria =

This is a list of hospitals in Austria.

== Graz ==
- Geriatrisches Krankenhaus der Stadt Graz
- Landeskrankenhaus Graz West
- Landeskrankenhaus (LKH) – Universitätsklinikum Graz
- Landesnervenklinik Sigmund Freud
- Krankenhaus der Barmherzigen Brüder Eggenberg
- Krankenhaus der Barmherzigen Brüder Graz
- Krankenhaus der Elisabethinen
- Unfallkrankenhaus Graz

== Linz/Upper Austria ==
- Allgemein öffentliches Krankenhaus der Elisabethinen
- Allgemein öffentliches Krankenhaus der Stadt Linz (AKH Linz) – Upper Austria
- Konventhospital Barmherzigen Brüder Linz
- Krankenhaus der Barmherzigen Schwestern
- Landesfrauen- und -kinderklinik (LKKF)
- Landesnervenklinik Wagner Jauregg
- Unfallkrankenhaus Linz (UKH Linz)
- Klinikum Grieskirchen-Wels (Wels)
- Klinikum Grieskirchen-Wels (Grieskirchen)

== Vienna ==
- Donauspital
- Hanuschkrankenhaus
- Lorenz-Böhler-Krankenhaus
- Privatklinik Döbling
- Privatklinik Josephstadt
- Rudolfinerhaus
- Sozialmedizinisches Zentrum Ost
- Steinhof
- Stem Cell Therapy Group Vienna
- Unfallkrankenhaus Meidling
- Vienna General Hospital (Allgemeines Krankenhaus, AKH)
- Wiener Privatklinik
- Wilhelminenspital

== Vorarlberg ==
- Landeskrankenhaus Feldkirch
- Landeskrankenhaus Bregenz
- Landeskrankenhaus Bludenz
- Krankenhaus der Stadt Dornbirn
- Landeskrankenhaus Hohenems
- Krankenhaus der Stiftung Maria Ebene, Frastanz

== Others ==
- General Hospital Kirchdorf – Kirchdorf
- Krankenhaus St.Josef – Braunau am Inn
- Landeskrankenhaus Vöcklabruck
- Landeskrankenhaus Zwettl – Zwettl
- Moorheilbad – Harbach (Austria)
- Privatklinik Althofen – Carinthia
- Universitätsklinik Innsbruck
