= Kirche am Steinhof =

Church in Vienna built by Otto Wagner

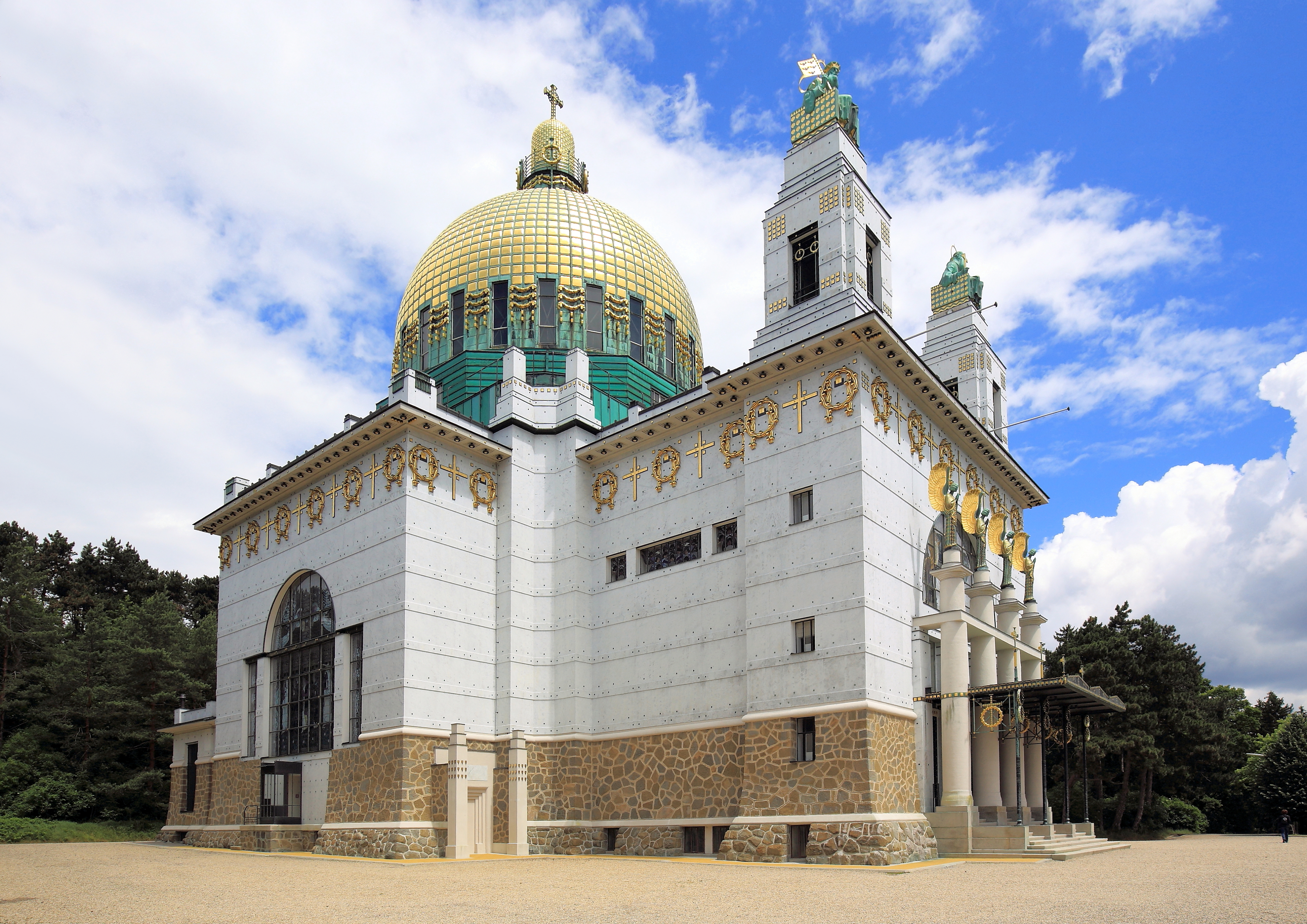
- Kirche am Steinhof, Vienna, Austria

- Location within Vienna Location within Austria

Religion
- Affiliation: Catholic Church
- Ecclesiastical or organisational status: Oratory

Location
- Location: Vienna, Austria
- Coordinates: 48.2105°N 16.2788°E

Architecture
- Architect: Otto Wagner
- Type: Church
- Style: Art Nouveau
- Groundbreaking: 1903
- Completed: 1907
- Construction cost: 575,000 krone

Specifications
- Direction of façade: S
- Capacity: 800
- Dome: 1
- Materials: Carrara marble, copper

Website
- www.wienkav.at

Kirche am Steinhof, also called the Church of St. Leopold, is the Roman Catholic oratory of the Otto-Wagner-Spital in the area of Steinhof in Vienna, Austria. The building, designed by Otto Wagner, is considered one of the most important Art Nouveau churches in the world.

== Description ==
The church, situated 310 metres (1,020 ft) above sea level, dominates and forms part of the Steinhof Psychiatric Hospital; previous official title was Niederösterreichische Landes-Heil- und Pflegeanstalt für Nerven- und Geisteskranke 'Am Steinhof' (Lower Austrian State Healing and Care Institution for the Neurologically and Mentally Sick, 'Am Steinhof'). It is located on a hillside (the Baumgartnerhöhe) below the Galitzinberg in the 14th Vienna district, Penzing. It has a separate status as part of the surrounding hospital and does not form part of the Archdiocese of Vienna.

== Architecture ==
The church dedicated to Saint Leopold was built between 1903 and 1907 by the 63-year-old architect Otto Wagner, with mosaics and stained glass by Koloman Moser and sculptural angels by Othmar Schimkowitz (1864–1947). The great majority of the other smaller details are the work of Otto Wagner himself. The statues on the two external towers represent Saint Leopold and Saint Severin (l. & r. respectively: they are the two patron saints of Lower Austria) and are the work of the Viennese sculptor Richard Luksch (1872–1936).

At the time, the temple was described as "resembling the tomb of an Indian maharaja".

Unusually the church lies on a north–south axis, at the centre-top of the hospital complex. Otto Wagner incorporated numerous features specifically related to its function within an asylum: e.g. there are very few sharp edges, and most corners are rounded; almost no crosses are visible; the priest's area is potentially entirely separate from the patients'; access to the pulpit is only from the vestry; emergency exits are built into the side walls in case a patient needed to be speedily removed; continuously flowing water replaced holy water stoups at the entrance; there were separate entrances for male and female patients, since gender segregation was mandatory in mental institutions at the time; confessionals were more open than is customary. There were toilet facilities easily accessible within the church in case of patient need. Originally the pews were of different widths to accommodate different categories of patient: calm / restless / disturbed (the latter needing more space). The floor is raked as in a theatre, though not as steeply; the fall from entrance to altar is approx. 26 centimetres (10 in): standing at the back the view to the altar is thus less obstructed.

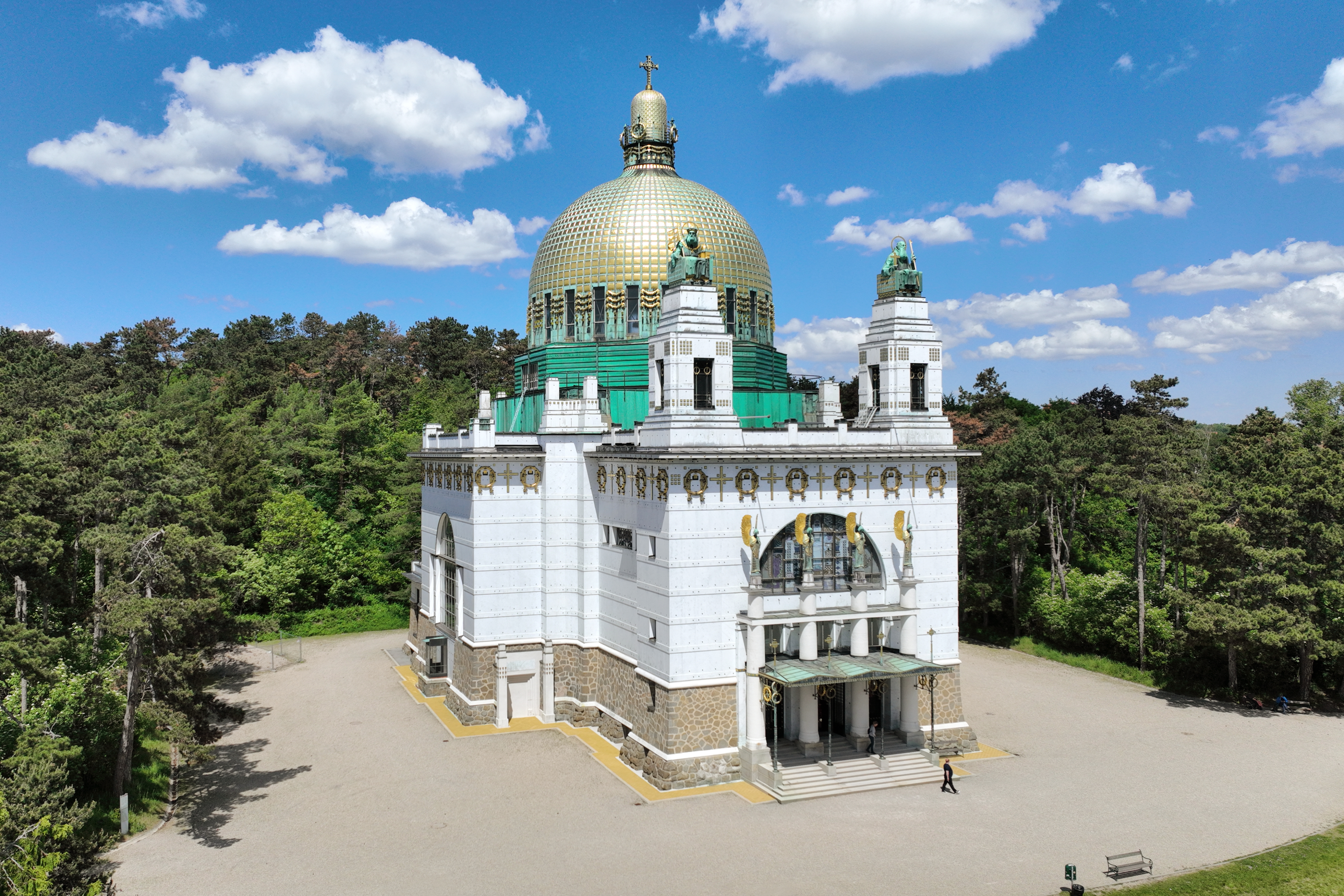
Aerial view of the church

The central ceiling below the unseen dome bears images relating to the four evangelists: the man for Matthew, the lion for Mark, the calf for Luke, the eagle for John. The magnificent windows at the sides of the Kirche am Steinhof portray seven saints (named underneath each frame) fulfilling Christ's commands both temporal (feed the hungry, clothe the naked, etc.) and spiritual; with above them a pair of flying angels and a quotation from the Beatitudes. The elaborate and brightly coloured mosaic behind the ornate altar represents the reception of the departed soul into heaven, via an ornate trompe-l'œil staircase which has been compared unfairly to a Hollywood-style movie award ceremony. Among the numerous saints attending the ceremony is Saint Dymphna the patron saint of those afflicted by epilepsy or mental illness. Also visible is St. Clement Hofbauer or Clemens Maria Hofbauer (1751–1820), the patron saint of Vienna. The dome of the church is not visible from inside the building; even so, the nave has an echo of six seconds. The church seats 800 people when full.

Due to lack of funds, several of Otto Wagner's original designs were never realized, including the Procession of the Cross, a private chapel beneath the church for Protestant services, and a Jewish synagogue.

The organ placed in the rear gallery is the work of the important turn-of-the-century organ builder Franz Josef Swoboda, among whose other instruments nearby are the organ at the Peterskirche in the centre of Vienna, and the organ of the Donaufeld church in the suburb of Floridsdorf on the other side of the Danube.

== History ==
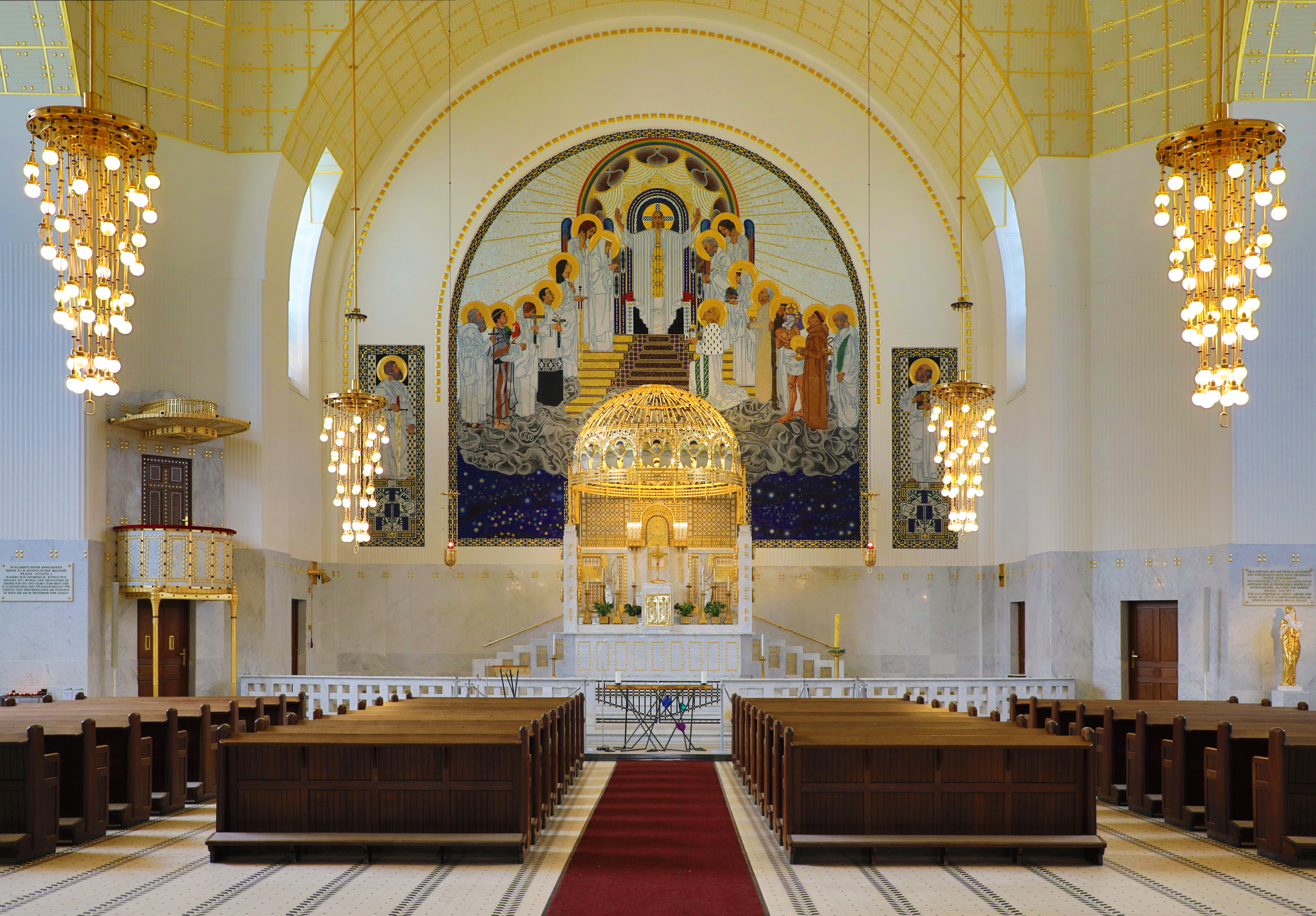
Interior view of the Otto Wagner's Church at Steinhof. Both the original and new altar are visible.

The Church of St. Leopold, better known as the Kirche am Steinhof, was built during the construction of the Steinhof Psychiatric Hospital (now the de:Otto-Wagner-Spital), from 1904 to 1907. When drafting his plans for the building, the commissioned architect, Otto Wagner, respected the church's role as the institutional chapel for mentally ill patients and consulted with doctors and nurses concerning the specific requirements of such a building. On October 8, 1907, the church was opened by Archduke Franz Ferdinand. The Archduke and Wagner were at odds on a variety of issues, not least on the overall design of the church. The former had disapproved of Wagner's art nouveau style from the very beginning; so much so, in fact, that he refused to acknowledge Wagner during the opening ceremony or to commission any other work from the architect. But opinions regarding Wagner's unusual design were varied. In an article published in the New Free Press on October 6, 1907, the author rhetorically asked: "And is it not a beautiful irony of fate, that the first sensible secessionist building in Vienna has been built for the insane?"

The most recent, and most extensive, restoration project began in June 2000. All told, 22 construction companies and 15 consultants worked on the restoration. Their first undertaking was to completely re-gild the exterior dome using 2 kg of .01mm-thin sheets of gold leaf. The base of the dome was renewed with copper sheets that, prior to their placement, were artificially patinated.

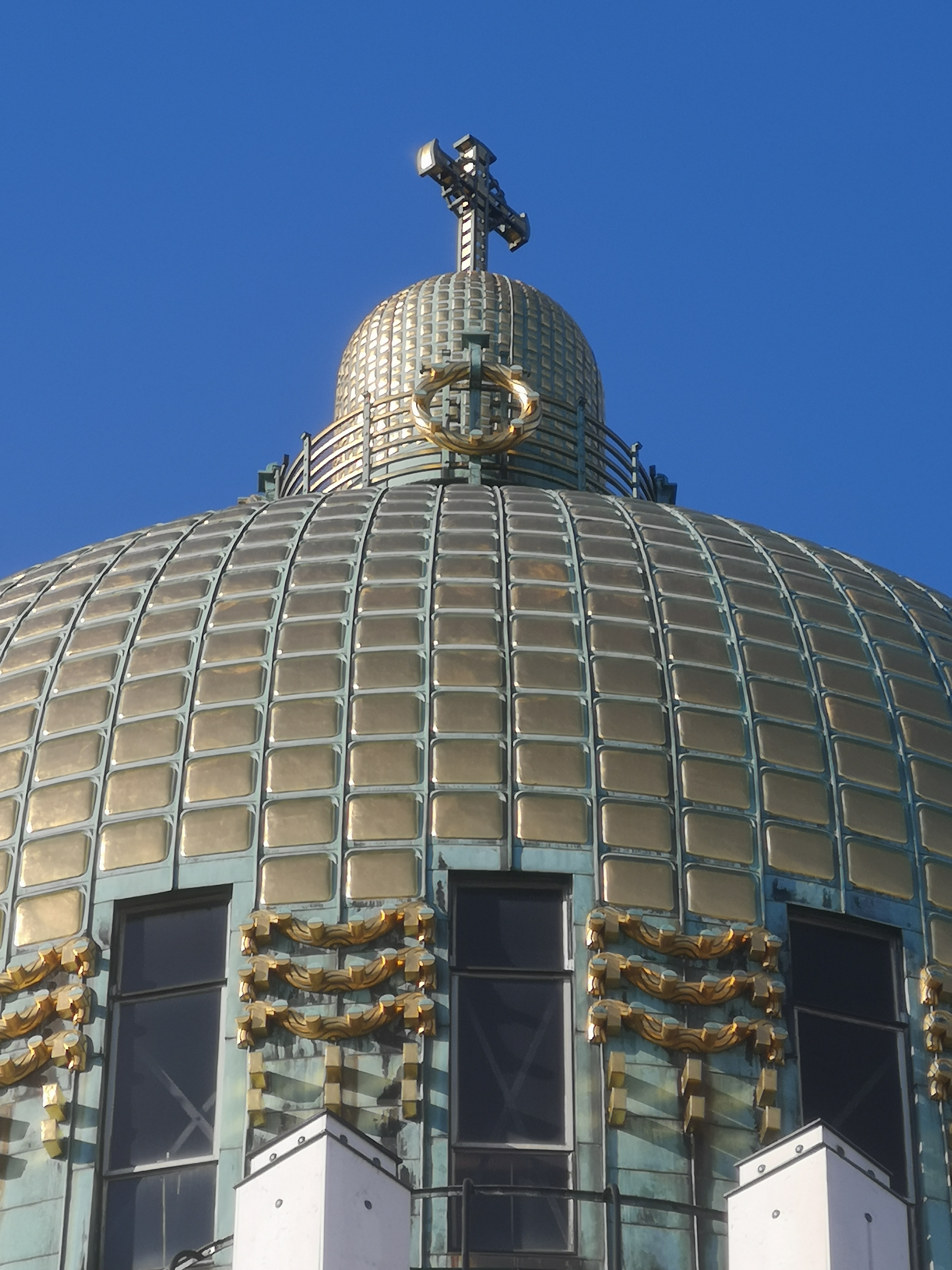
Kirche am Steinhof - closeup of its golden dome.

Between 2002 and 2004, the entirety of the church's 1,800m² façade was replaced with 3000 plates of Carrara marble, each tile having been examined by ultrasound to ensure quality. The angelic and holy figures were removed and transported to a workshop where they were restored. Construction began on the interior of the church in 2005. Among other projects, each of the mosaic windowpanes were glazed and remounted in a specially designed support structure. The windows, which have been valued at 5 million Euro, are now better protected from the elements and vandalism. The mosaics within the church, main altar, pulpit, chandeliers, sconces, and wall decorations were restored and newly gilded. Trained wood restorers polished and improved the pews and confessionals. The plasterboard ceiling was also rebuilt. About half of the original 2,200 plaster tiles were salvageable, the rest were replaced.

While the interior renovations were ongoing, the foundation of the church, the drainage system, and the exterior base were completely renewed. After the renovations were complete, a wheelchair-accessible entrance was added on the north side of the church.

After the 6-year long renovation project, the church was finally reopened on October 1, 2006.

Prior to its reopening, Steinhof church was selected as a main motif of one of the most famous euro collectors coins: the Austrian 100 euro Steinhof Church commemorative coin, minted on November 9, 2005. The obverse gives an angled perspective view of the left-side and main door of the building.
