= Ernst Illing =

German psychiatrist (1904–1946)

Ernst Illing (6 April 1904 - 30 November 1946) was medical director of the Vienna Psychiatric-Neurological Clinic for Children Am Spiegelgrund clinic, where hundreds of children were murdered during World War II. After joining the Nazi Party in 1933, Illing, who was born in Leipzig, held various positions, including senior physician for the Luftwaffe, before becoming director of the Spiegelgrund clinic in 1942. In 1946, he was found guilty of abuse resulting in death for murdering over 250 children, sentenced to death, and ordered to forfeit all of his assets. Illing was executed by hanging in Vienna later that year.
