= Otto-Wagner-Spital =

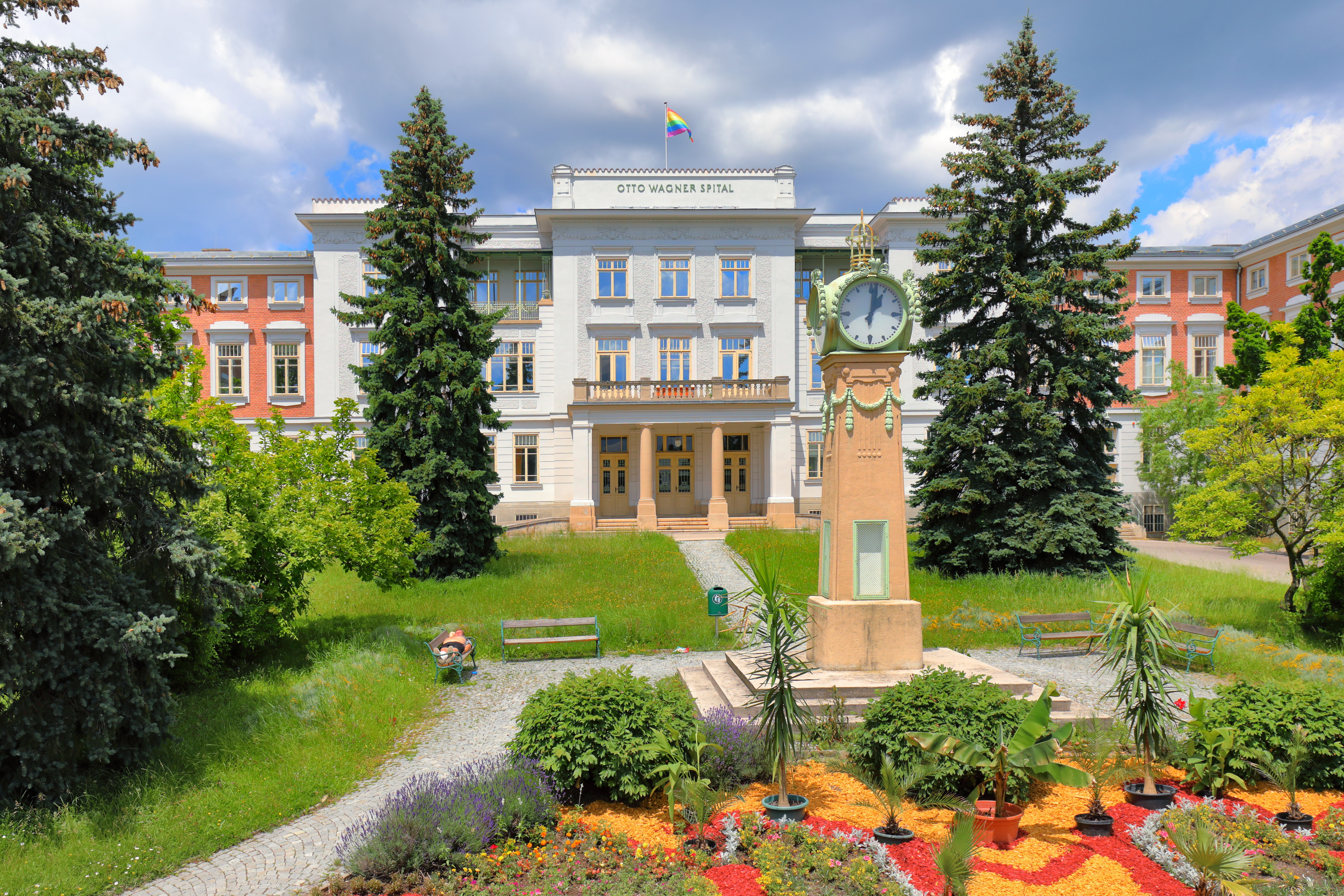
- Management building at the main entrance of the hospital

Geography
- Location: Vienna, Austria
- Coordinates: 48°12′31″N 16°16′47″E

Organisation
- Type: Specialist

Services
- Speciality: Psychiatric

History
- Opened: 1907

Links
- Lists: Hospitals in Austria

The Otto-Wagner-Spital (English: Otto Wagner Hospital) is a hospital in Vienna, Austria. It was originally a psychiatric hospital and center for pulmonology.

The hospital lies in Steinhof, an area of the 14th district of Vienna, Penzing, and was built according to the plans of architect Otto Wagner and opened in 1907. The building is made up of 60 pavilions that were designed by Carlo von Boog. The Kirche am Steinhof is located at the center of the compound. An Art Nouveau theater is found further on the grounds.

In 2000, five health facilities were consolidated under the label Sozialmedizinisches Zentrum Baumgartner Höhe - Otto Wagner Spital mit Pflegezentrum (Baumgartner Höhe Social Medicine Center - Otto Wagner Hospital and Care Center). The five facilities are

- Förderpflegeheim Baumgartner Höhe (advancing care)
- Neurologisches Krankenhaus Maria-Theresien-Schlössl (neurology)
- Pflegeheim Sanatoriumstraße (nursing care)
- Psychiatrisches Krankenhaus Baumgartner Höhe (psychiatry)
- Pulmologisches Zentrum Baumgartner Höhe (pulmonology).

The center also hosts the Gedenkstätte zur Geschichte der NS-Medizin in Wien (Memorial to the History of Nazi-Medicine in Vienna) memorial and exhibition, which opened in 2002.

During the Second World War, 789 children were tortured and murdered in the Children's Ward of the hospital.

== See also ==
- Am Spiegelgrund clinic
