= Brandenburg killing centre =

Killing centre used in Nazi Germany

Coordinates: 52°24′38.5488″N 12°33′2″E

The Brandenburg killing centre (German: NS-Tötungsanstalt Brandenburg), officially known as the Brandenburg an der Havel State Welfare Institute (Landes-Pflegeanstalt Brandenburg a. H.), was a killing centre established in 1939 as part of the Nazi "involuntary euthanasia" programme, known after the war as Aktion T4. Nearly 10,000 people were murdered there during its operation, primarily those with mental and physical disabilities. They were deemed as "lives unworthy of life" by Nazi Germany.

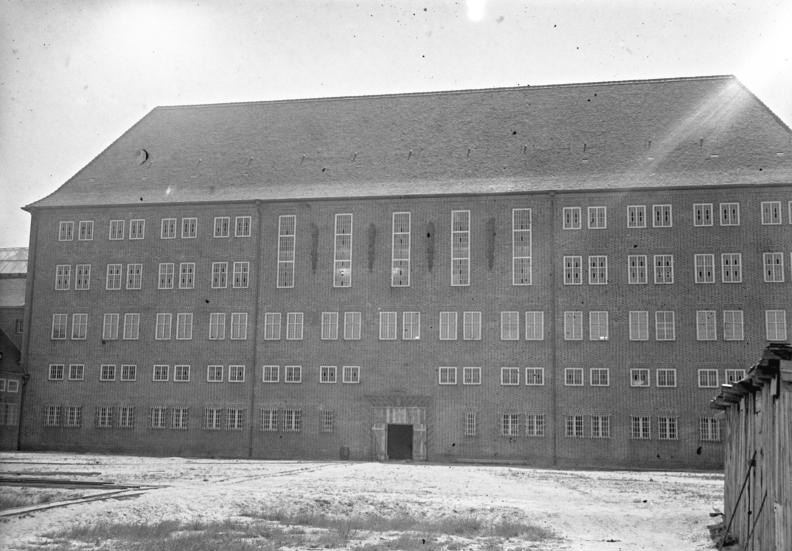
Newly erected main jail in 1931

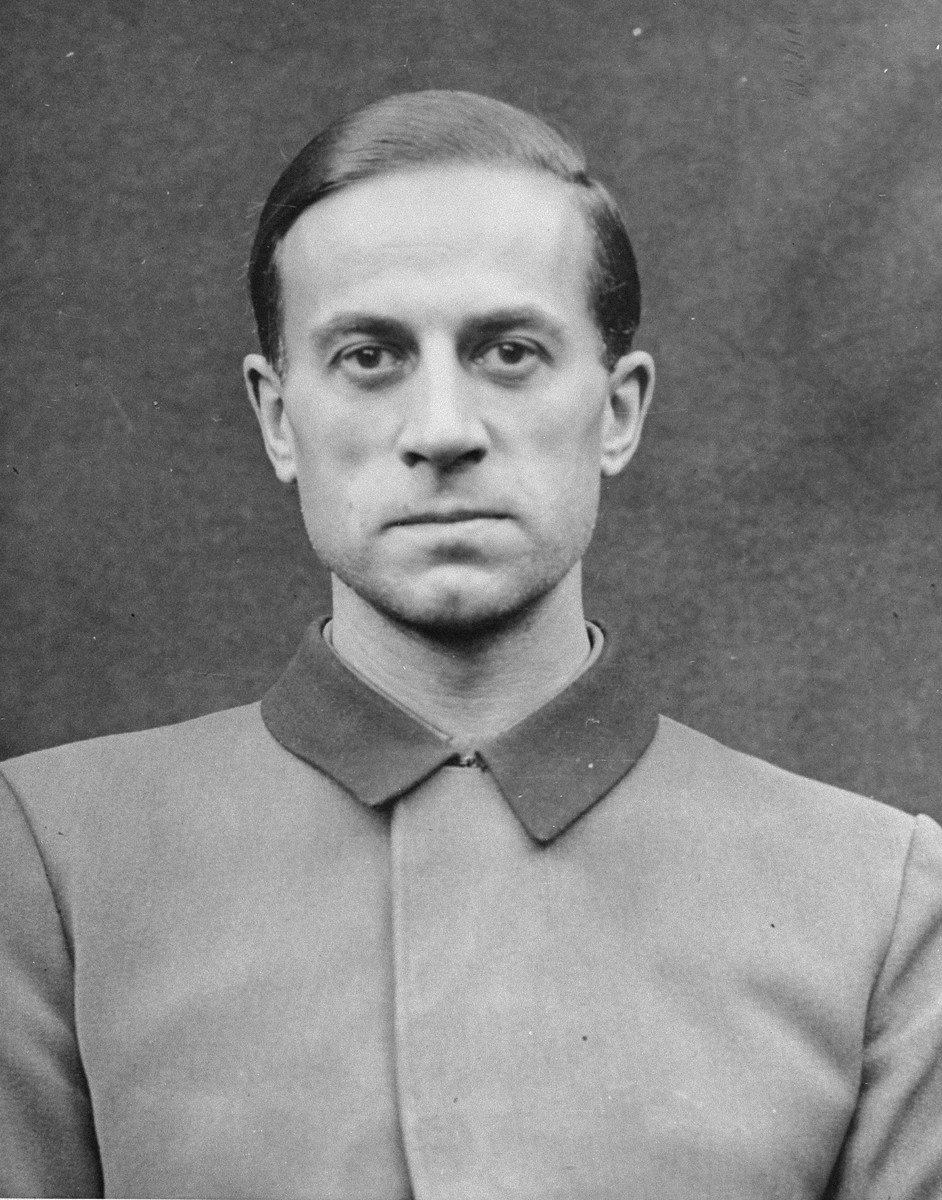
Karl Brandt, Hitler's personal physician and organizer of Action T4

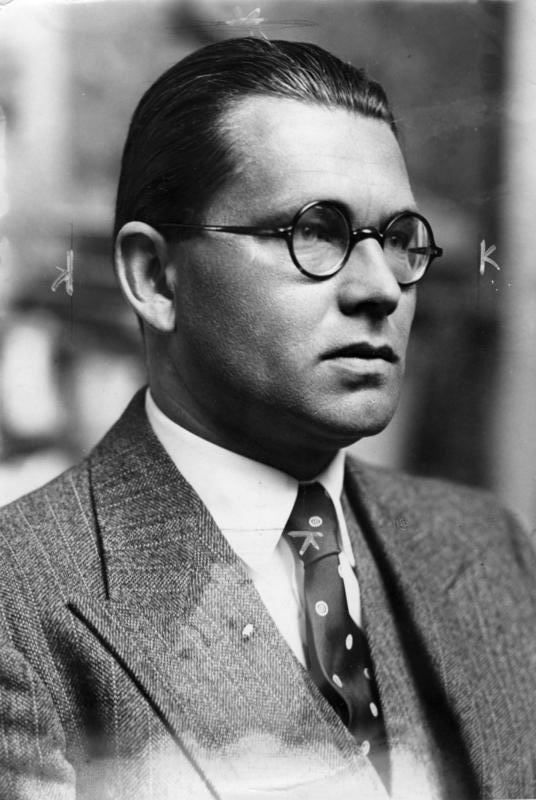
Philipp Bouhler, Head of the T4 programme

== Overview ==
The killing centre was located in Brandenburg an der Havel in the old jail in Neuendorfer Straße 90c. Brandenburg Concentration Camp was housed in these buildings from August 1933 to February 1934.

A concentration camp, one of the first in Germany, was located on Neuendorfer Straße in Brandenburg Old Town. After closing this inner city concentration camp, the Nazis used the Brandenburg-Görden Prison, located in Görden, a suburb of Brandenburg. Later the old jail became the Brandenburg killing centre, where the Nazis murdered people with psychiatric disorders, including children. After the war, this programme was referred to as "Action T4" because of the Berlin address, Tiergartenstraße 4, the organization's headquarters. Brandenburg an der Havel was one of the first locations in Nazi Germany where the Nazis experimented with killing their victims by gas. This foreshadowed the mass-murder in Auschwitz and other extermination camps. After complaints by local inhabitants about the smoke, the mobile furnaces used to burn the corpses ceased operation. Shortly after this, the Nazis closed the old prison.

At the centre, Christian Wirth experimented in developing gas chambers for gassing the physically and mentally disabled. The murder of people with carbon monoxide started in January 1940 at the centre under Irmfried Eberl. The gas chambers were disguised as showers and the victims were taken to the centre under the false pretense that they were being transferred to a mental hospital.

In October 1940, the Brandenburg institution and all of its staff were transferred to the newly established Bernburg killing centre.

== Victim numbers ==
According to a table compiled in 1942 and discovered in 1945, the so-called Hartheim Statistics, a total of 9,972 people were murdered in a gas chamber at the Brandenburg or the Bernburg killing centres in 1940.

1940	Feb	Mar	Apr	May	Jun	Jul	Aug	Sep	Oct	Nov	Dec	Total
	105	495	477	974	1,431	1,529	1,419	1,382	1,177	397	387	9,772

These statistics only cover the first killing phase, under Action T4, that was halted by an order from Hitler dated 24 August 1941.

== See also ==
- Hartheim killing centre
- Am Spiegelgrund clinic

== Sources ==
- Klee, Ernst (1985). 'Euthanasie' im NS-Staat. Die Vernichtung lebensunwerten Lebens. Frankfurt am Main: Fischer Taschenbücher. ISBN 3-596-24326-2. 4326. (Probevergasung, Hungerkost)
- Klee, Ernst, ed. (1985). Dokumente zur "Euthanasie". Frankfurt am Main: Fischer Taschenbücher. ISBN 3-596-24327-0. 4327.
