= Life unworthy of life =

Phrase in Nazi Germany

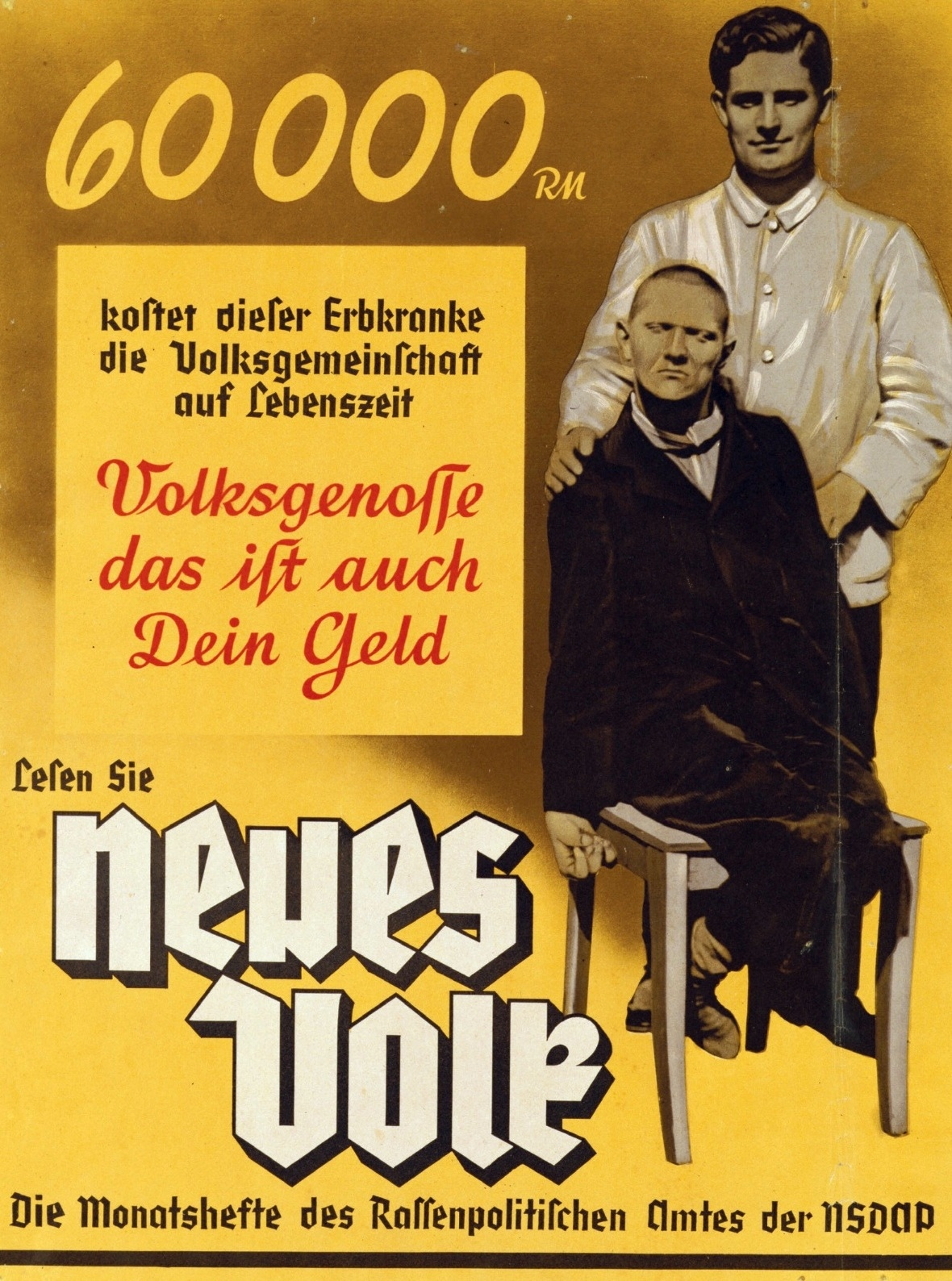
This poster (published in the NSDAP's Office of Racial Policy's monthly magazine Neues Volk around 1938) urges support for eugenics to control the public expense of sustaining people with genetic disorders. The poster says: "This person who suffers a hereditary disease has a lifelong cost of 60,000 Reichsmarks to the National Community. Fellow German, that is your money as well."

The phrase "life unworthy of life" (German: Lebensunwertes Leben) was a Nazi designation for the segments of the populace which, according to the Nazi regime, had no right to live. Those individuals were targeted to be murdered by the state via involuntary euthanasia, usually through the compulsion or deception of their caretakers. The term included people with disabilities and later those considered grossly inferior according to the racial policy of Nazi Germany. This concept formed an important component of the ideology of Nazism and eventually helped lead to the Holocaust. It is similar to but more restrictive than the concept of Untermensch (subhumans), as not all "subhumans" were considered unworthy of life (Slavs, for instance, were deemed useful for slave labor).

The involuntary euthanasia program was given the name Aktion T4 and was officially adopted and put in action in 1939 through the personal decision of Adolf Hitler. Although the program ended officially in 1941 due to public protests, it was continued unofficially and more discreetly, and grew in extent and scope through the Aktion 14f13 program, which targeted concentration camp inmates. The systematic extermination of certain cultural and religious groups, as well as people with physical and mental disabilities, continued in this manner until the end of World War II. The methods used initially at German hospitals such as lethal injections and bottled gas poisoning were expanded to form the basis for the creation of extermination camps where cyanide gas chambers were purpose-built to facilitate the extermination of the Jews, Romani, communists, anarchists, and political dissidents.

Historians estimate that 200,000 to 300,000 people were murdered under this program in Germany and occupied Europe. (Note: As many as 100,000 people may have been killed directly as part of Aktion T-4. Mass euthanasia killings were also carried out in the Eastern European countries and territories Nazi Germany conquered during the war. Categories are fluid and no definitive figure can be assigned but historians put the total number of victims at around 300,000.)

== History ==
The expression first appeared in print via the title of a 1920 book, Die Freigabe der Vernichtung Lebensunwerten Lebens (Allowing the Destruction of Life Unworthy of Life) by two professors, the jurist Karl Binding (retired from the University of Leipzig) and psychiatrist Alfred Hoche from the University of Freiburg. According to Hoche, some living people who were brain damaged, intellectually disabled and psychiatrically ill were "mentally dead", "human ballast" and "empty shells of human beings". Hoche believed that killing such people was useful. Some people were simply considered disposable. Later the killing was extended to people considered 'racially impure' or 'racially inferior' according to Nazi thinking.

The concept culminated in Nazi extermination camps, instituted to systematically murder those who were unworthy to live according to Nazi ideologists. It also justified various human experimentation and eugenics programs, as well as Nazi racial policies.

== Development of the concept ==
According to the author of Medical Killing and the Psychology of Genocide psychiatrist Robert Jay Lifton, the policy went through a number of iterations and modifications:

Of the five identifiable steps by which the Nazis carried out the principle of "life unworthy of life," coercive sterilization was the first. There followed the killing of "impaired" children in hospitals; and then the killing of "impaired" adults, mostly collected from mental hospitals, in centers especially equipped with carbon monoxide gas. This project was extended (in the same killing centers) to "impaired" inmates of concentration and extermination camps and, finally, to mass killings in the extermination camps themselves.

== See also ==
- Aktion T4 – Nazi mass-murder of the sick and disabled
- Nazi concentration camp badges
- Victims of Nazi Germany
- Department of Film (Nazi Germany)
- Glossary of Nazi Germany: Useless eaters
- Nazi eugenics – Nazi German policy of the murder of "undesirable" persons
- Nazism and race – Racist foundations of Nazism
- Sagamihara stabbings – 2016 hate crime in Japan
- Social cleansing – Widespread killing based on perceived social status
- Am Spiegelgrund clinic – Nazi euthanasia facility in Austria
