= Erich Traub =

German veterinarian, scientist and virologist

- Born: 27 June 1906; Asperglen, German Empire
- Died: 18 May 1985 (aged 78); Rosenheim, West Germany
- Citizenship: German, American
- Education: Rockefeller Institute for Medical Research
- Known for: Foot-and-mouth disease
- Scientific career
- Fields: Virologist
- Workplaces: University of Giessen; Riems Island, German Reich

Erich Traub (27 June 1906 – 18 May 1985) was a German veterinarian, scientist and virologist who specialized in foot-and-mouth disease, Rinderpest and Newcastle disease. Traub was a member of the National Socialist Motor Corps (NSKK), a Nazi motorist corps, from 1938 to 1942. He worked directly for Heinrich Himmler, head of the Schutzstaffel (SS), as the lab chief of the Nazis' leading bio-weapons facility on Riems Island under the direction of Kurt Blome.

Both Traub and Blome were rescued from the Soviet zone of Germany after World War II and taken to the United States in 1949 under the auspices of the United States government program Operation Paperclip, meant to rescue the scientific knowledge in Germany, and protect it from the Soviet Union.

Since the early XXIst century, Traub has been a common target of false and disproven conspiracy theories centred about his claimed role in the development or modification of the Lyme disease, despite Lyme disease having been present in human populations for thousands of years.

== Career ==
=== Early career and war ===
During the 1930s, he studied on a fellowship at the Rockefeller Institute for Medical Research in Princeton, New Jersey mentored by Richard Shope, performing research on vaccines and viruses, including pseudorabies virus and lymphocytic choriomeningitis virus (LCM). During his stay in the United States, Traub and his wife were listed as members of the German American Bund, a pro-Nazi German-American club thirty miles west of Plum Island in Yaphank, Long Island, from 1934 to 1935.

Traub worked at the University of Giessen, Germany, from 1938 to 1942. Traub was a member of the Nazi NSKK, a motorist corps, from 1938 to 1942. The NSKK was declared a condemned, not a criminal organization at the Nuremberg trials.

From 1942 to 1948, Traub worked as lab-chief at the Reich Research Institute for Virus Diseases of Animals (German: Reichsforschungsanstalt für Viruskrankheiten der Tiere) on Riems Island (German: Insel Riems), a German animal virus research institute in the Baltic Sea, now named the Friedrich Loeffler Institute. The institute was headed by Prof. Dr. Otto Waldmann from 1919 to 1948, while Traub was vice-president.

The Institute at Riems Island was a dual use facility during the Second World War where at least some biological warfare experiments were conducted. It had been founded in 1909–10 to study foot-and-mouth disease in animals and by World War II employed about 20 scientists and a staff of 70–120. Hanns-Christoph Nagel, a veterinarian and biological warfare expert for the German Army, conducted experiments there, as did Traub.

The institute was administered under the Innenministerium (Ministry of the Interior), which Reichsführer-SS Heinrich Himmler took over in 1943. The chain of command was Himmler, Dr. Leonardo Conti (Reich Health Leader), Kurt Blome, Waldmann, and then Traub. Traub specialized in viral and bacterial diseases. He was assisted by Anna Bürger, who was later also brought to the United States after the war, to work with the Navy's biological warfare program.

On orders from Himmler and Blome, the Deputy Reich Health Leader and head of the German biological warfare program, Traub worked on weaponizing foot-and-mouth disease virus, which has been reported to have been dispersed by aircraft onto cattle and reindeer in Russia. In 1944, Blome sent Traub to pick up a strain of Rinderpest virus in Turkey; upon his return, this strain proved inactive (nonvirulent) and therefore plans for a Rinderpest product were shelved.

=== Post-war ===
Immediately after the war Traub was trapped in the Soviet zone of Allied occupied Germany. He was forced to work for the Soviets from his lab on Riems Island. In July 1948, the British evacuated Erich Traub from Riems Island as a "high priority Intelligence target" since it was now in the Soviet Zone and they feared that Traub was assisting in their biological warfare program. Traub denied this, however, claiming that his only interest was foot-and-mouth disease in animals.

Traub was brought to the United States in 1949 under the auspices of the United States government program Operation Paperclip, meant to exploit scientific knowledge in Germany, and deny it to the Soviet Union. From 1949 to 1953, he was associated with the Naval Medical Research Institute in Bethesda, Maryland.

Months into his Operation Paperclip contract, Traub was asked to meet with US scientists from Fort Detrick, the Army's biological warfare headquarters, in Frederick, Maryland. As a noted German authority on viruses he was asked to consult on their animal disease program from a Biological Warfare perspective. Traub discussed work done at the Reich Research Institute for Virus Diseases of Animals on Riems Island during World War II for the Nazis, and work done after the war there for the Russians. Traub gave a detailed explanation of the secret operation at the institute, and his activities there. This information provided the ground work for Fort Detrick's offshore germ warfare animal disease lab on Plum Island.

His publicly published research from his time in the United States reports disease research not directly related to weaponization. In 1951, he published a report for the Naval Medical Research Institute on Newcastle Disease virus in chicken and mammalian blood cells. Two years later, he published a paper for the Navy on the mechanisms of immunity in chickens to Newcastle and the possible role of cellular factors. Also in 1953, he published another paper for the Navy with Worth I. Capps on the foot-and-mouth disease virus and methods for rapid adaptation.

Traub served as an expert on foot-and-mouth disease for the FAO of the UN in Bogotá, Colombia, from 1951 to 1952, in Tehran, Iran, from 1963 to 1967, and in Ankara, Turkey, from 1969 to 1971.

=== Return to Germany ===
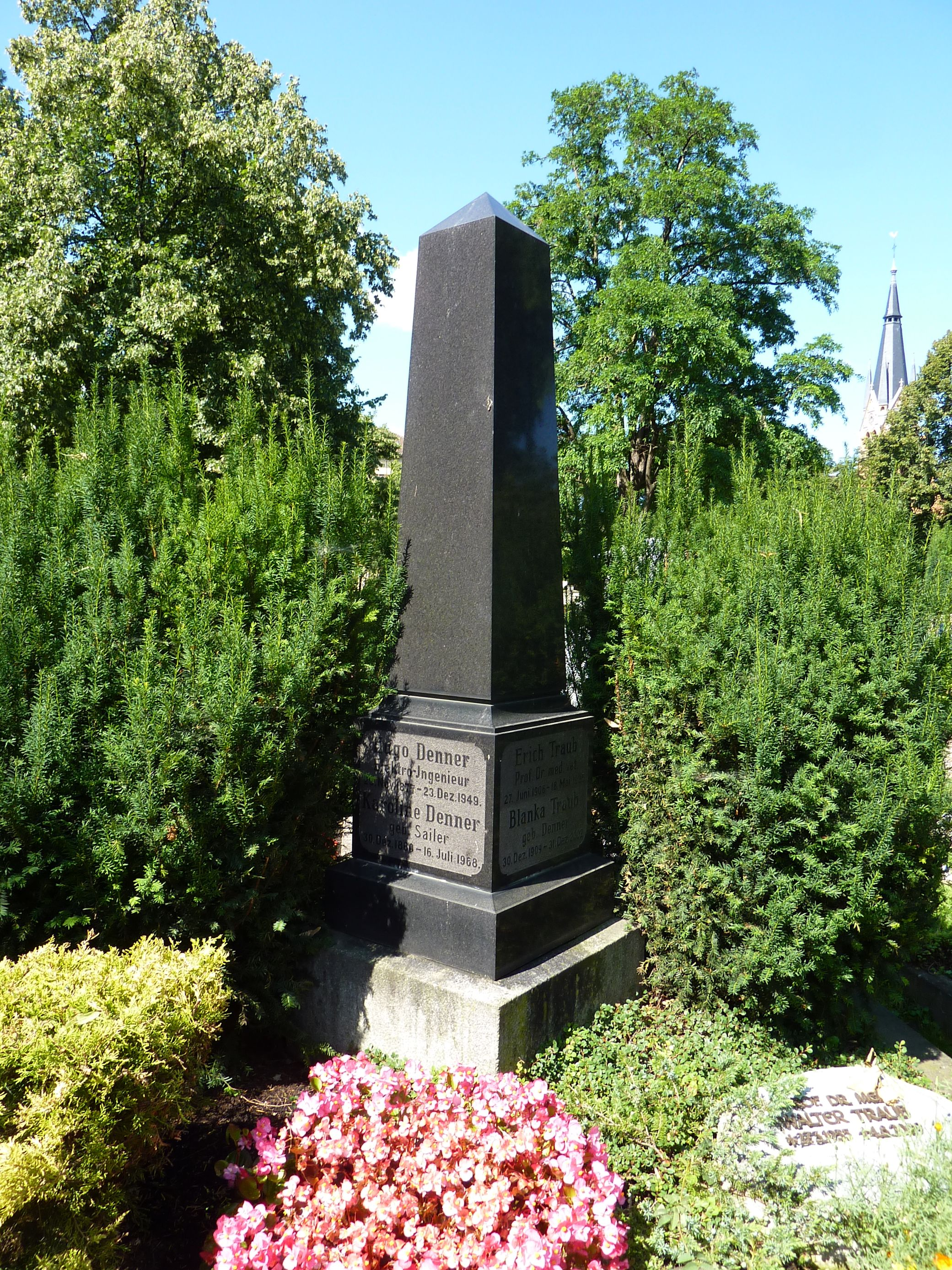
Tombstone

After working on biological research for the U.S. Navy from 1949 to 1953, Traub returned to Germany and founded a new branch of the Loeffler Institut in Tübingen, and headed it from 1953 to 1963. In 1960, Traub resigned as Tübingen's director due to the scandal related to accusations of financial embezzlement. He continued with limited lab research for three more years, but then ended his career at Tübingen.

In 1964, Traub published a study for the Army Biological labs in Frederick, Maryland on Eastern Equine Encephalomyeltitis (EEE) immunity in white mice and its relationship to Lymphocytic choriomeningitis (LCM), which had long been a research interest of his. Annie Jacobsen reports that Traub's FBI file says he joined Iran's Razi Vaccine and Serum Research Institute "in the mid-1960s".

He retired from the West German civil service in 1971. In 1972, on the occasion of the 500th anniversary of LMU Munich, Traub received an honorary doctorate degree in Veterinary Medicine for his achievements in basic and applied Virology (basic research on LCM; definition and diagnosis of type strains of FMD and their variants; development of adsorbate vaccines against fowl plague, Teschen disease of swine, and erysipelas of swine).

On 18 May 1985, Traub died in his sleep in West Germany. He was seventy-eight years old.

== Bio-weapon research ==
In theory, insects of all types, particularly the biting species, can be used as disease vectors in a biological warfare program. Germany, Japan, Britain, Russia and the U.S. all conducted experiments along these lines during the Second World War, and the Japanese used such insect-borne diseases against both soldiers and civilians in China. This was one reason that President Franklin Roosevelt and Secretary of War Henry Stimson ordered the creation of an American biological warfare program in 1942, which was headquartered at Camp Detrick, Maryland. This eventually grew to a very large facility with 245 buildings and a $60 million budget, including an Entomological Weapons Department that mass-produced flies, lice and mosquitoes as disease vectors. Although the British bio-weapon facility at Porton Down concentrated on the production of anthrax bombs, it also conducted experiments on insects as vectors.

After the war, the Army's 406th Medical General Laboratory in Japan cooperated with former scientists from Unit 731 in experimenting with many different insect vectors, including lice, flies, mosquitoes, ticks, fleas, spiders and beetles to carry a wide variety of diseases, from cholera to meningitis. At Fort Detrick in the late 1940s, Theodore Rosebury also rated insect vectors very highly, and its entomological division had at least three insect-vectored weapons ready for use by 1950. Some of these were later tested at the Dugway Proving Grounds in Utah, and allegedly used during the Korean War as well.

Traub visited the Plum Island Animal Disease Center (PIADC) in New York on at least three occasions in the 1950s. The Plum Island facility, operated by the Department of Agriculture, conducted research on foot-and-mouth disease (FMD) of cattle, one of Traub's areas of expertise. Traub was offered a leading position at Plum Island in 1958 which he officially declined. It has been alleged that the United States performed bioweapons research on Plum Island.

Fort Terry on Plum Island was part of the U.S. biological warfare program in 1944–46, working on veterinary testing in connection with the weaponization of brucellosis. After the war, research on biological weapons continued at Pine Bluff in Arkansas and Fort Detrick, Maryland, while officially at least Plum Island was transferred to the U.S. Department of Agriculture. From 1949, Plum Island also conducted work on biological weapons against animals and livestock, such as foot-and-mouth disease, Rinderpest, Newcastle disease, African swine fever and plague and malaria in birds. Traub's research work from the Second World War onward involved at least the first three of these (all dangerous only to non-human animal species).

== See also ==
- Edgewood Arsenal
- Project MKULTRA
- Project MKNAOMI
- Claus Schilling
- Sigmund Rascher
- Kurt Blome
- Fort Detrick
