= Nanna Conti =

German midwife and Nazi (1881–1951)

Nanna Conti, née Pauli (21 April 1881 – 30 December 1951) was a German midwife who headed the association of German midwives during the Nazi Germany and held the position of Reichshebammenführer (Reich Midwives Leader) from 1933. She was the mother of Leonardo Conti, who headed Nazi health programs as Reich Health Leader.

== Life and work ==
Conti was born in Uelzen to a Prussian origin family and was politically influenced by her father, Dr. Carl Eugen Pauli (1839–1901), who was associated with the Pan-German League. Dr. Pauli was from West Pomerania and Conti's mother, Anna (née Isecke), was from Lebork, Pomerania. Conti also had two brothers, one older who emigrated to the United States as an adult, and the other a younger brother who died in childhood. Her father's extramarital affair led her mother to separate from him and raise the children alone. In 1884, the family moved to Leipzig and, in 1893, to Lugano.

Nanna married Silvio Conti (1872–1964) in 1898 and they had three children, two boys and one girl, who survived into adulthood apart from several miscarriages. In 1902, she separated from her husband, moved to Magdeburg and apprenticed as a midwife. She began working as a freelance midwife in Berlin in 1905. She then worked in Charlottenburg and became a member of the Prussian association of midwives. The association worked for greater powers for midwives and for a law that made them responsible for childbirth, giving them priority over physicians.

Drawn to Völkisch and nationalist causes after the First World War, Conti became a member of the conservative German National People's Party in 1918 and then the German Völkisch Freedom Party in 1922. Like her sons, Conti became a member of the Nazi Party, joining it in 1930. She was also a member of Deutschvölkischer Schutz- und Trutzbund, the largest and most active antisemitic organization in the Weimar Republic during the early post-war years.

Following the Nazi seizure of power, Conti was appointed chairperson for the German midwives association. She wrote on midwife practice and promoted Nazi ideology and antisemitism. She was involved in the passing of laws that excluded Jewish midwives, which caused them to be almost nonexistent in Germany until the 1980s. She was involved in reducing maternal mortality and helped establish a school of midwifery in Berlin. She represented Germany at a conference in London in 1934 and hosted the 1936 meeting at Berlin and, as chairperson of the Congress, she was automatically declared president of the International Midwives Union (founded in 1919 and later becoming the International Confederation of Midwives) in 1936.

Conti was well respected for her improvement of maternal mortality rates. She was also involved in policies such as forced sterilization of women with disabilities or hereditary diseases. In 1938, she was involved, along with her son, in the passing of a law that mandated the presence of a midwife at every birth in Germany.

In 1945, she fled to live in Schleswig-Holstein and escaped any punishment. She moved to Bielefeld in 1951 where she lived until her death. Her son Leonardo committed suicide in prison while the other committed suicide before the end of the war.
