= Gerhard Wagner (physician) =

German Nazi medical leader (1888–1939)

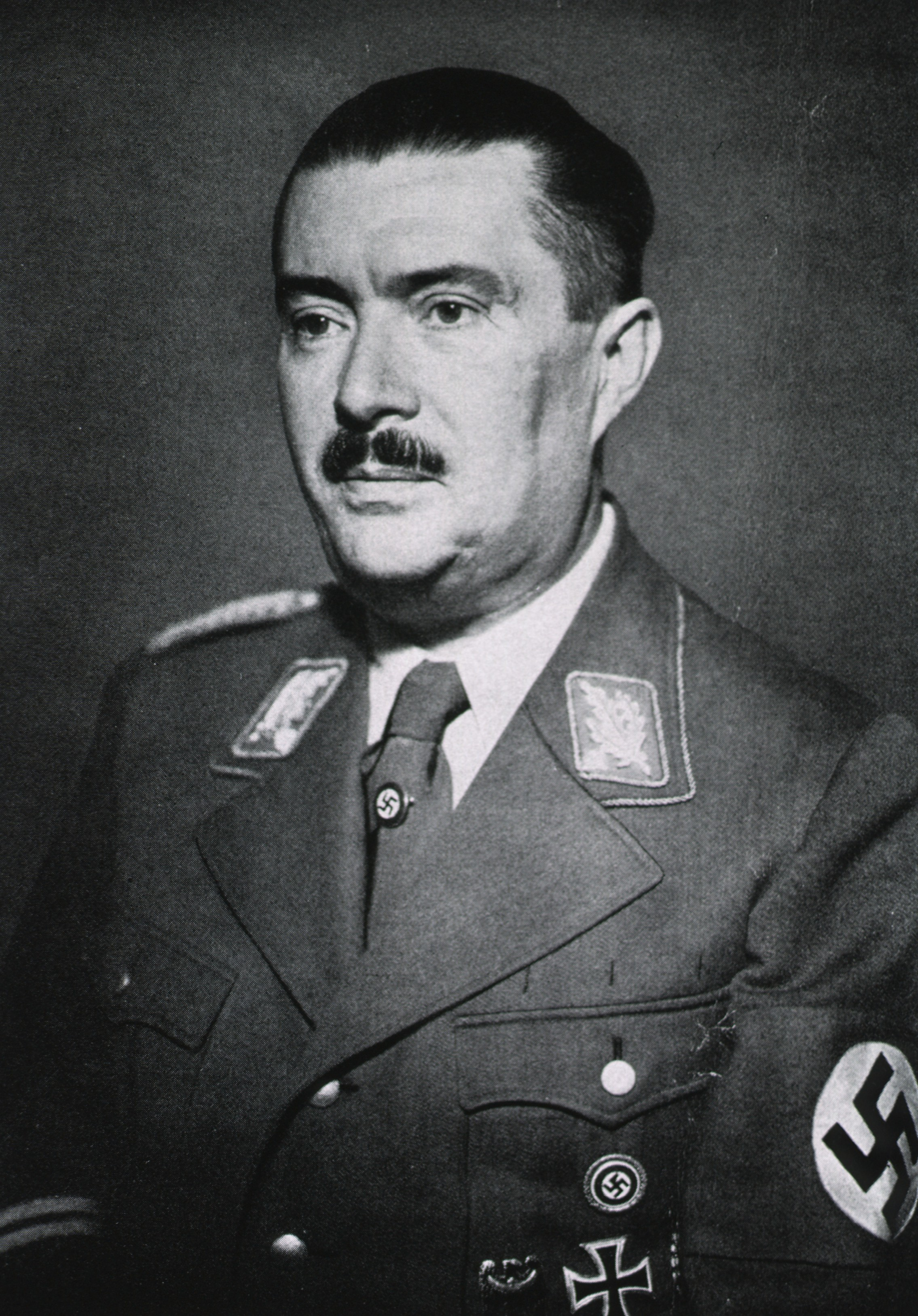
- Wagner in 1937

Reich Health Leader
- In office 1934–1939
- Deputy: Hans Deuschl
- Preceded by: Office established
- Succeeded by: Leonardo Conti

Personal details
- Born: 18 August 1888 Neu-Heiduk, Kingdom of Prussia, German Empire
- Died: 25 March 1939 (aged 50) Munich, Nazi Germany
- Awards: Iron Cross First Class

Military service
- Allegiance: Nazi Germany
- Rank: SA-Obergruppenführer

Gerhard Wagner (18 August 1888 – 25 March 1939) was the first Reich Doctors' Leader (Reichsärzteführer) in the time of Nazi Germany.

== Life ==
=== Pre-Nazism ===
Born a surgery professor's son, he studied medicine in Munich and served as a doctor at the front in World War I (1914–1918). Among other things, he was awarded the Iron Cross, first class.

From 1919, Wagner ran his own medical practice in Munich, while also being a member of the Freikorps units Epp and Oberland between 1921 and 1923. Just because of his Upper Silesian origins, Wagner stayed on (till 1924) as leader of the Upper Silesia German Community Associations (Deutschtumsverbände Oberschlesiens) and was chief of Munich's division of the Loyal Upper Silesians ("Verbände heimattreuer Oberschlesier"). In May 1929, he switched to the NSDAP.

=== 1930s ===
Wagner was co-founder and, as of 1932, leader of the National Socialist German Doctors' League, and also functioned from 1933 as a member of the Palatinate Landtag until its dissolution in October 1933. At the November parliamentary election, Wagner was elected as a deputy to the Reichstag from electoral constituency 27 (Pfalz). He was reelected in March 1936 from the now enlarged Rheinpfalz–Saar constituency and, at the April 1938 election, switched to represent constituency 3, Berlin East, and held this seat until his death.

In 1934, Wagner was appointed to the position of Reich Doctors' Leader. Moreover, he was "The Führer's Commissioner for National Health". By 1933, he had already become leader of the Main Office for National Health, and in 1936 came his appointment as that office's Main Service Leader (Hauptdienstleiter). In December 1935, Wagner became leader of the Reichsärztekammer (Physicians' Chamber).

At the 1936 Nuremberg Rally, Wagner discussed the racial laws. As was typical of Nazi propaganda at this time, this was more in terms of the pure and growing race than the evil of the Jews. A shift in his political career came in 1937 when he was promoted to SA-Obergruppenführer. Meanwhile, he was also commissioner for collegiate issues on Rudolf Hess's staff. Wagner died of cancer in 1939. His successor was Leonardo Conti.

== See also ==
- Neue Deutsche Heilkunde
