= Alexander Baron Engelhardt =

Baltic German physician and medical historian

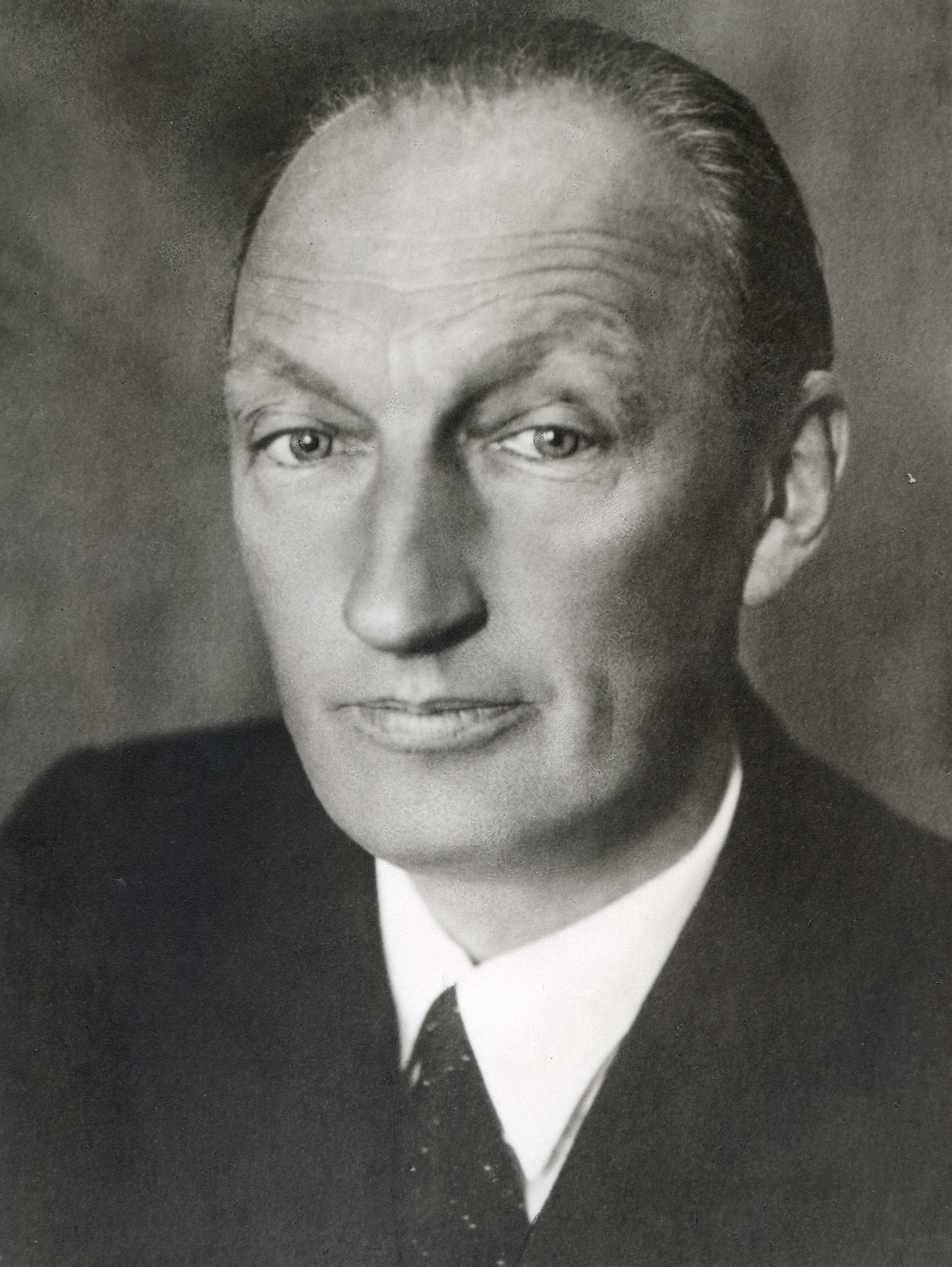
Alexander Baron Engelhardt

Alexander Baron von Engelhardt (3 June 1885 – 26 May 1960) was a Baltic German physician and medical historian. For several decades, he dedicated himself to preserving the memory of Emil von Behring and safeguarding the estate of the first Nobel Prize winner in medicine in Marburg.

== Biography ==
Alexander Baron Engelhardt was born in 1885 in the village of Alaküla in the Governorate of Estonia. He initially received private tuition. From the fall of 1901, he attended the Kaiser Alexander I Classical Grammar School in Reval. He passed his school-leaving examination there in 1906. From the fall of 1906, he studied medicine at the University of Dorpat. He became a member of the Baltic Corporation Estonia Dorpat.

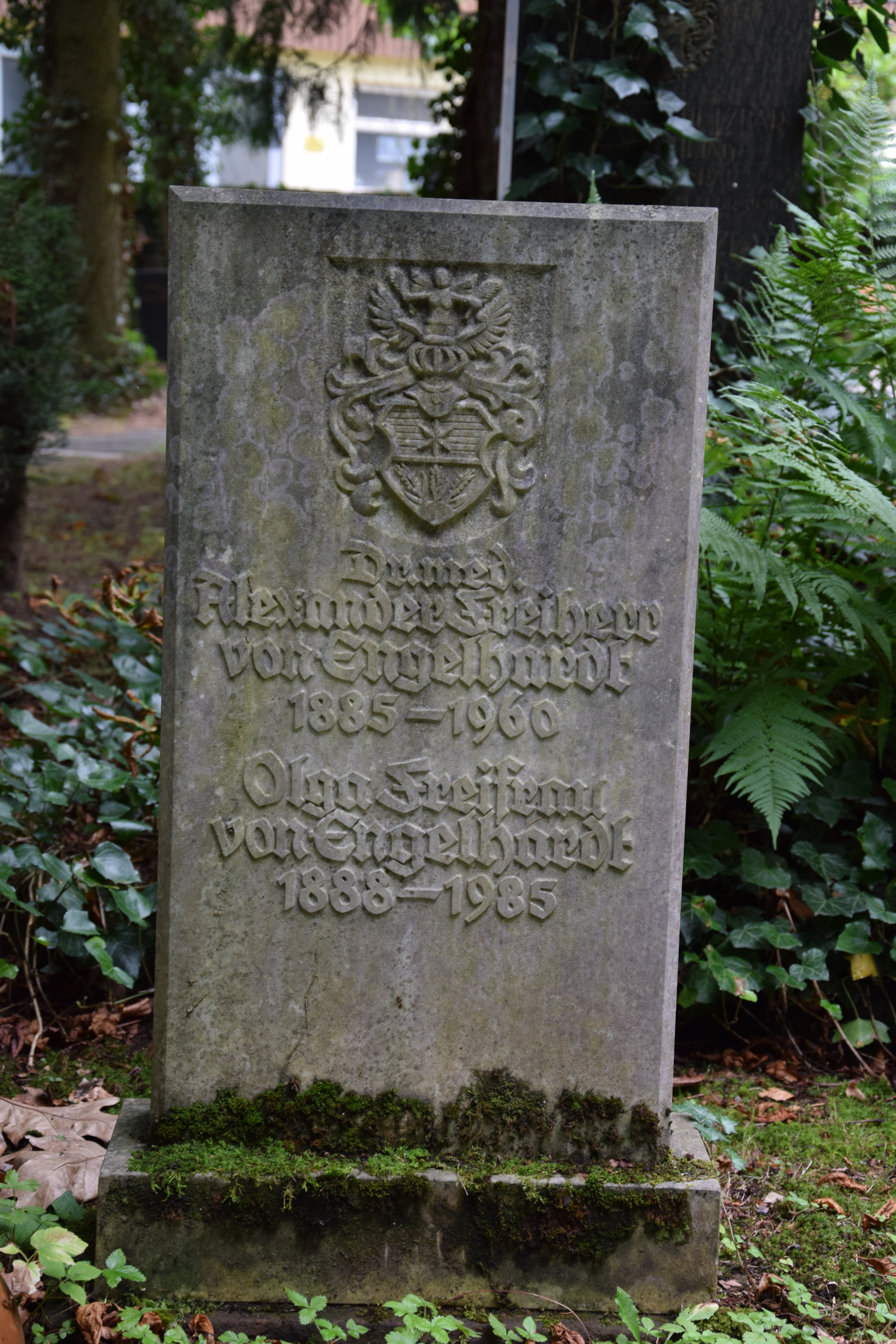
Grave of Alexander Baron Engelhardt at the main cemetery in Marburg (2017)

In the summer semester of 1910, he transferred to the Ludwig-Maximilians-Universität München. He received his doctorate in medicine in 1912 After passing the Russian state examination in Moscow in the same year, he worked as a pediatrician in Moscow for two years. During the First World War, he served as a military doctor in the Imperial Russian Army. In 1918/19 he was a doctor at the city hospital in Riga. He went to Germany in 1919 and was a factory doctor in Worms from 1920 to 1923. He passed the German state medical examination at the University of Giessen in 1923.

From 1923 to 1958, he was the Scientific Secretary of the Behringwerke. Marburg University gave him a lectureship in the history of medicine, initially as a substitute for Hans-Ulrich Rosemann (winter semester 1941/42 to winter semester 1944/45, summer semester 1950, winter semester 1951/52 to summer semester 1953). He taught as an honorary professor until summer semester 1960. As an associate professor of medicine, he supervised several dissertations on medical history.

On 8 July 1937, he applied for membership to the Nazi Party and was accepted retroactively to 1 May of the same year (membership number 4.195.343). He was also a member of the Sturmabteilung, National Socialist People's Welfare, German Labour Front and the National Socialist German Doctors' League. He was also head of the specialist group of the Zentrale für Ostforschung.

From 1951 to 1953, he was the first chairman of the Baltic Philistine Association. He died on 26 May 1960 in Marburg.
