= Neue Deutsche Heilkunde =

Nazi Germany medical program

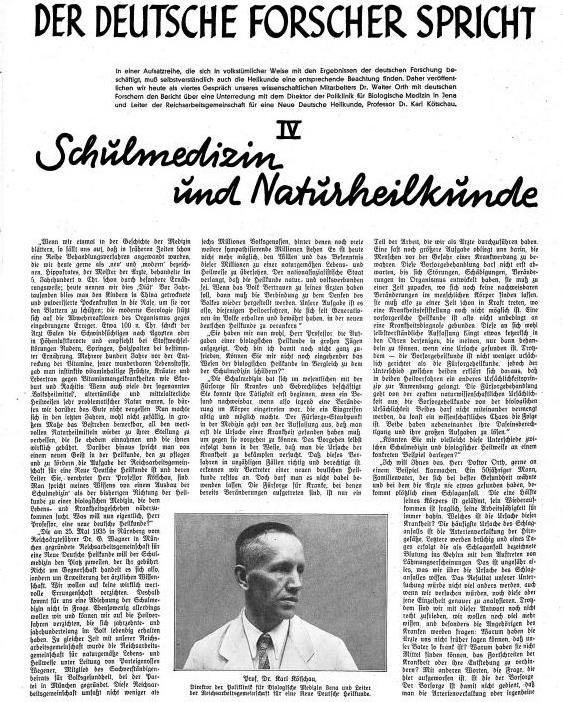
Propaganda interview with Dr. Karl Kötschau, discussing the aims of German New Medicine. Illustrierter Beobachter (1936)

New German Medicine (German: Neue Deutsche Heilkunde) was a movement in Nazi Germany during the 1930s and 1940s that aimed to integrate conventional scientific medicine with various forms of alternative medicine, including naturopathy and homeopathy. Driven by prominent Nazi leaders such as Rudolf Hess and Heinrich Himmler, who were ardent supporters of alternative healing practices, the movement sought to create a unified German medical system that emphasized natural and holistic approaches to health.

== Medical crisis ==
=== Medical freedom laws ===
Reichstag of the North German Confederation passed the Commercial Code of 1869 which reinstates Kurierfreiheit, allowing both licensed and unlicensed practitioners medical freedom. While academically trained practitioners are restricted to using the term "medical practitioner" under §29, Heilkunst (the art of healing) can be practiced by anyone without specific qualifications. Pressure from physicians leads to the addition of §56 in 1883, prohibiting "traveling healers," with subsequent restrictions.

=== Crisis in 1920s ===
The rising number of lay practitioners exacerbated medical ignorance, prompting the Reichstag's attention in 1909, though a drafted law fails. In the 1920s, doctors face a significant crisis as inflation pushes health insurance companies to financial ruin. Settlement of accounts shifts to quarterly, prompting doctor strikes as they blame the social system for inadequate financing. To address such pressing issues such as the so called "Crisis of Medicine" and the "Quackery Problem" it was widely acknowledged (by Healthcare professionals, policymakers, and scholars) that the strictly natural science-based approach to medicine was deficient and needed to incorporate insights from psychology, psychoanalysis, and naturopathy.

Furthermore, there was a growing lack of trust in the medical profession among the public, attributed in part to the reductionist perspective of medicine and the widening gap between diagnostic and therapeutic capabilities, as well as social insurance systems. Among the most prominent critics of contemporary medicine was Erwin Liek (1878-1935), a renowned surgeon and gynecologist, who argued for doctors to assert leadership in health policy, which should also encompass eugenic considerations.

=== Amalgamation ===
The naturopathy movement and scientific medicine's growing confrontation led to the amalgamation of naturopathic organizations in 1926. The "Reich Committee for the Nonprofitmaking Organizations of the Movement for Health in the Population" served as the umbrella organization, bringing together leading associations such as the German Biochemical Association, Association of Homeopathic Lay Practitioners, German Association of Organizations for Natural Living and Healing, Kneipp Federation, Bund der Felkevereine, and Central Association for Parity in Medical Practice.

== History of movement ==
=== Development (1933-1936) ===
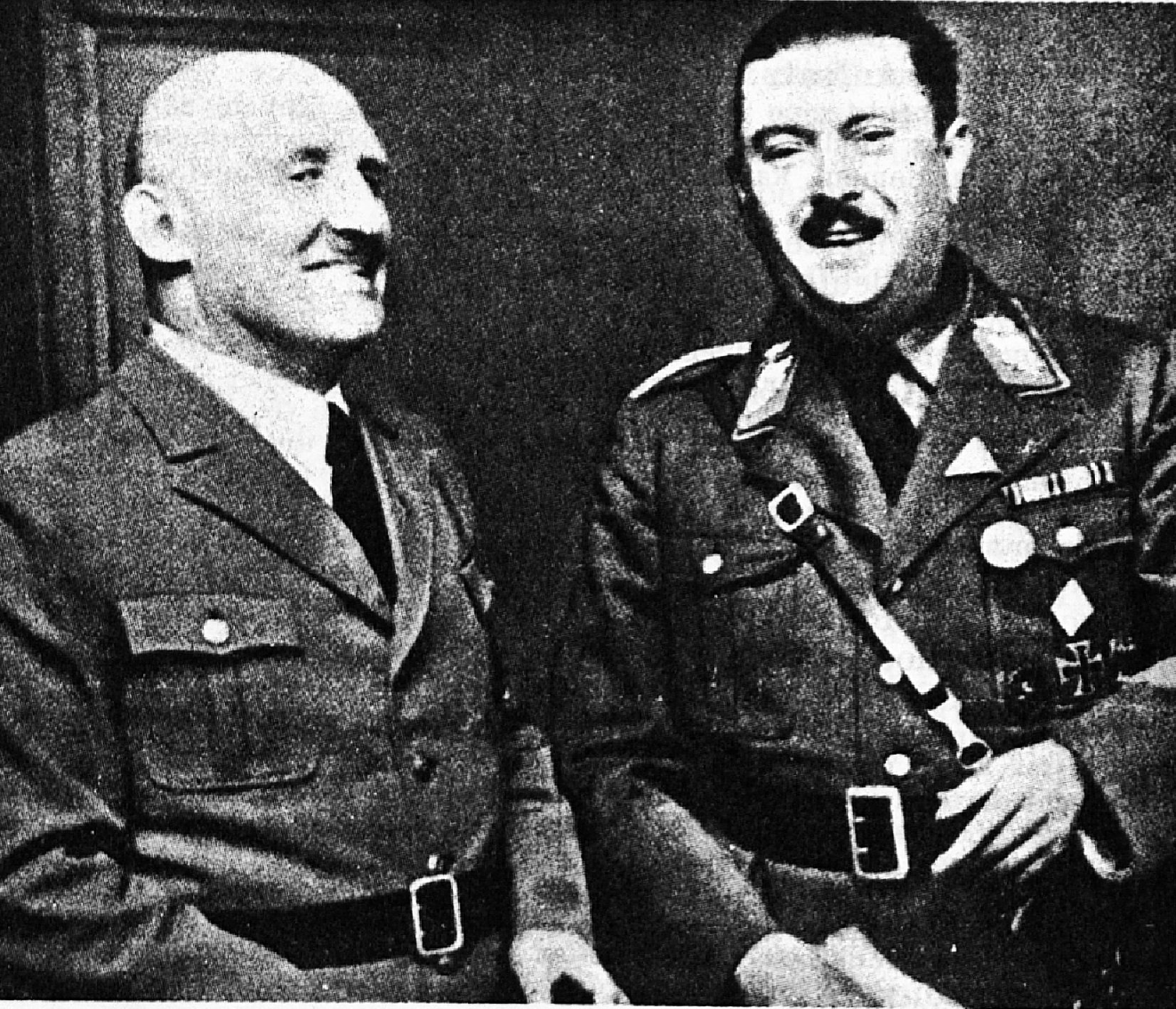
Frankish leader Julius Streicher in conversation with Reich Medical Leader Dr. Wagner (1935)

With the rise of National Socialism in 1933, recognition from conventional medical practitioners was achieved with government support.

The precursor to the Neue Deutsche Heilkunde was the Deutscher Verband der Ärzte für physikalische-diätetische Behandlung (German Association of Doctors for Physical-Dietetic Treatment), which gathered in November 1934, at the Rudolf Hess Hospital in Dresden. The hospital was established on June 5, 1934, as a center for medical research in natural therapy.

In May 1935, during the Nuremberg conference "Volksheilkunde aus Blut und Boden," Julius Streicher announced the establishment of the Reichsarbeitsgemeinschaft für eine Neue Deutsche Heilkunde (Reich Working Group for a New German Medicine), to be led by Dr. Karl Kötschau. This announcement took place at the Reichstagung der deutschen Volksheilbewegung (Meeting of the Popular German Therapeutic Movement).

Several medical organizations encompassing fields such as psychotherapy, baths and climate therapy, homeopathy, Kneipp therapy, naturalistic medicine, private hospitals, and anthroposophic medicine merged to comply with the new health policy. The merged organization had seven corporate members, including leading associations of homeopathic and naturopathic physicians, alongside the League for Biodynamic Healing.

On issue number twelve of "Internationales Ärztliches Bulletin" dated December 1935, the Reich Physicians' Leader Dr. Wagner, declared:

If we want to build a new medical science today, the foundation of this medical science can never be exact natural science, but the foundation can only be our National Socialist worldview.

Starting from January 1936, a series of meetings took place, organized by the NSDAP, occurred in Nuremberg and was attended by University of Erlangen medicine faculty members along with all medical professors. During this gathering, Wagner criticized the traditional approach to medical education, highlighting its narrow focus on producing doctors, natural scientists, and technicians. He advocated for a new orientation in medical training, emphasizing the need for a revamped German medicine that would be more inclusive of diverse therapeutic methods and open-minded in its approach to scientific inquiry. Kötschau stated the need to move past the division between medical factions. He praised biological medicine's success, suggesting that traditional medicine had reached its limits.

In April 1936, the first Reich Meeting of the Association for a New German Medicine was held in Wiesbaden, coinciding with the 48th Congress of the German Society of Internal Medicine. The event marked the apex of the Association's influence, with key figures such as Wagner, Kötschau, Hermann Griesbeck, Alfred Schwenkenbecher, and Hermann Berger worked to promote the integration.

=== Consolidation and transition (1937-1940) ===
Official recognition of natural therapies, including homeopathy came in the form of a law called the Reichsärzteordnung (Medical Regulation of the Reich) in 1937 which introduced a new professional statute, redefining medical specialties.

The initiative's demise stemmed from insurmountable challenges. For instance, Wagner advocated setting aside naturopathic practices that clashed with public health measures like vaccination, pharmaceutical treatments, and localized diagnostic methods. Furthermore, the wartime demand for healthcare professionals to tend to military personnel and address public health issues at home necessitated licensed doctors with academic backgrounds. Persistent conflicts between lay healers and licensed doctors, as well as between lay healers and academic medicine, persisted, transcending political, religious, and racial divides.

The organization responsible for developing policy for the Neue Deutsche Heilkunde was dissolved in January 1937 by Wagner.

However, despite this setback, the aspiration to establish the New German Medicine persisted, as Wagner maintained that its objectives remained unchanged. Subsequently, from 1937 onward, there was a shift in the understanding of "synthesis," though the fundamental principles and recognition by official medicine were retained, despite past criticism and disparagement. Key objectives included the training of all German doctors, especially the younger generation, and the establishment of educational institutions.

The dissolution of the New German Medicine gained momentum following Wagner's passing on March 25, 1939. Leonardo Conti (1900-1945) assumed his role as the City Medical Advisor of Berlin, having previously served as the director in the Berlin Gau of the German Association of Doctors of National Socialism. Conti's background in medical bureaucracy inclined him toward conventional medicine.

After 1940, the concept of integrating conventional medicine, homeopathy, and natural therapies disappeared entirely. Medical journals exclusively focused on conventional medicine and its perceived achievements.

=== Post-war influence (1945 and beyond) ===
As part of the Denazification efforts in the German Democratic Republic, and to distinguish itself from the capitalist Federal Republic of Germany, stricter control was imposed on Naturopathy. This led to a significant reduction in the number of practitioners specializing in natural therapies, with only twelve remaining by 1989. It appears that the practice was effectively marginalized from the public health system.

In contrast, in the Federal Republic, approximately 35,000 doctors specialized or had subspecialties in natural therapies, highlighting a significant disparity between the two German states. Following the war, there was a noticeable surge in the popularity of natural therapies, medicines, and consumer products in the postwar West, a trend that continues in Germany's medical marketplace.

However, in the Western context, both consumers and practitioners often prioritize addressing individual bodily concerns over engaging with social criticism within the realm of alternative medicine.

== Areas of practice ==
=== Anthroposophy ===
With the assistance of Hess, Müller, and other Nazi officials, anthroposophist medicine became one of the central constituents of the Neue Deutsche Heilkunde. Dr. Friedrich Husemann led the doctors within the anthroposophical movement, which later became the League for Biodynamic Healing. They advocated for anthroposphist medicine within Nazi health policies, receiving support from government officials like Dr. Eugen Stähle and Ludwig Müller. The movement also established institutions which found support from Nazi leaders like Julius Streicher.

Streicher in his publication "Deutsche Volksgesundheit aus Blut und Boden" covered anthroposophist health initiatives. Reporting on a meeting of naturopathic physicians in June 1934, the periodical gave special attention to Husemann's presentation on "the threefold nature of the human organism" as well as Dr. Wilhelm Pelikan's final presentation on "anthroposophical medicine." Reports on the November 1934 meeting of naturopathic doctors at the Rudolf Hess Hospital in Dresden highlighted the role of biodynamics and praised Dr. Josef Schulz's presentation on Demeter products.

However, anthroposophy continued to be a part of National Socialist health measures. A conference held in July 1938, sponsored by the Nazi public health authorities, featured prominent anthroposophist Franz Dreidax as a presenter. Most of the attending doctors were members of the Nazi Party, including Dr. Ernst Harmstorf, an early adopter of anthroposophical medicine.

==== Heilpraktiker ====
Heilpraktikergesetz is the first regulation to the law governing the professional practice of medicine without a medical license. It was issued on 18 February 1939, and outlines conditions and procedures for obtaining a permit to practice as a Heilpraktiker (non-medical practitioner) in Germany.

According to Historian Michael H. Kater, the law introduced specific certification requirements and made membership in the regime-approved natural healers association mandatory. Although this gave Heilpraktiker a veneer of professionalism, it did not make them truly respectable. To control the profession, no new entrants were allowed.

However, concessions were made to the unlicensed due to the Nazi health leaders' empathy for them. Unlicensed persons could become legitimate physicians or enter medical faculties without the usual qualifications, while others could continue practicing as long as they did not charge fees. Traditional doctors were required to assist registered nature healers upon request, adding to their frustration. The traditional medical establishment saw this as a threat, with regular doctors being forced to cooperate with unqualified healers.

=== Naturopathy ===
Gerhard Wagner and Dr. Kurt Blome thought that combining traditional medicine with naturopathy helped better study the cause (aetiology) and treat cancer, which was increasingly recognized as a common ailment in the general population also known as Volkskrankheit (people's disease.)

Physicians and lay healers were encouraged to lead by example and promote a healthier lifestyle, with an emphasis on natural eating for racial health. (Gesundheitsführung.)

This ideological shift influenced various health institutions, which became platforms for integrating natural diet practices into Nazi ideology. Government bodies like the Division of Public Health and the Ministry of Education supported research and propaganda promoting natural eating. For example, the Department of Nutritional Physiology conducted basic research, while organizations like the German Society for Nutritional Research and the Study Group for Public Nutrition aligned nutritional studies with Nazi principles and disseminated them widely.

Universities, such as the University of Berlin, also embraced the natural lifestyle ethos. At the Institute for Nutrition Doctrine, led by physician Sigwald Bommer, advocacy for a "healthy, natural, and simple" diet for racial hygiene was prominent. The Nazi Party itself endorsed natural diets, with the Main Office for Public Health spearheading efforts in the 1930s.

According to Heinrich Himmler, leader of the Schutzstaffel, eliminating "the artificial" was central to this vision. He was an advocate of select aspects of natural living, and he is quoted as saying:

We are in the hands of the food industries ... the artificial is everywhere, everywhere food is adulterated, provided with ingredients which are said to make it last longer or look better or enrich it or anything else that the advertisers of the food industry care to say.

Arthur Scheunert, a prominent nutritional physiologist in Nazi Germany, stirred controversy in 1933 by asserting that preserved fruits and vegetables were as nutritious as fresh ones. His claims were met with skepticism in Hippokrates, the main journal of New German Medicine, where Erwin Liek countered with a passionate defense of fresh foods. Scheunert's support for synthetic vitamins further fueled the debate, with proponents of natural diets arguing that artificial preparations could never match the quality of natural vitamins. This discourse reflected a broader effort to make the German diet more natural, not only by eliminating artificial elements but also by aligning food with racial and economic goals, emphasizing domestic production as vital for racial fitness and national preparedness for war.

=== Homeopathy ===
After the 1937 Homeopathic World Congress in Berlin and amidst political backing from the Nazi regime for ideological purposes, homeopathy gained favor, and the Imperial Ministry of Health (Reichsgesundheitsamt) endorsed homeopathic pathogenetic trials. These trials were intended to be conducted in a blinded and placebo-controlled manner. However, it appears that the publication of the trial results was suppressed. Fritz Donner, a German physician and homeopath, candidly documented both the trials and concerning practices within clinical medicine. In clinical settings, patients with conditions such as ulcers, pernicious anemia, gonorrhea, and hyperthyroidism were administered homeopathic remedies. Advocates of homeopathy were inclined to highlight remarkable symptoms observed during the pathogenetic trials when confronted with placebos, while disregarding the lack of therapeutic efficacy in their patients.

Himmler's interest in folk medicine, particularly homeopathic treatments, prompted him to initiate experiments to evaluate the efficacy of homeopathy in treating purulent diseases. Under the direction of Prof. Grawitz, a medical team, including Dr. Heinrich Schütz, Dr. Hermann Kiesewetter, and Prof. Theodor Laue, conducted tests supervised by concentration camp physicians like Karol Babor and Waldemar Wolter. Despite meticulous execution, the results, reported to Himmler in August 1942, showed no significant improvement in the condition of most experimentees. While some cases exhibited positive outcomes, Prof. Grawitz noted difficulties with administering homeopathic tablets, which sparked Himmler's displeasure.

One such case of misuse involves the homeopathic manufacturer and physician Gerhard Madaus (1890-1942), who conducted experiments with the plant Dieffenbachia seguine, demonstrating its capacity to induce sterility. These experiments were conducted for scientific purposes and possibly for commercial reasons. However, Heinrich Himmler took an interest in Madaus' research after Dr. Adolf Pokorny, a dermatologist with connections to Himmler, brought two of Madaus' publications to his attention. The prospect of using Dieffenbachia to sterilize the three million Bolsheviks in German prisons, rendering them as laborers but incapable of reproduction, was deemed appealing and offered "the most far-reaching perspective. An aide to Himmler considered this a highly classified project of national significance and arranged for representatives from the large industrial giant I.G. Farben to visit the Madaus company and acquire a supply of the plant. Madaus was instructed not to publish any further findings on the subject but was given the opportunity to continue working with criminals who would have been sterilized under existing law regardless. Madaus declined this offer, and the project ultimately fizzled out due to a lack of plant supplies.

=== Other practices ===
The National Socialist regime was interested in Hydrotherapy and Nature Therapy. Proclaiming ‘Air, light, a healthy diet and exercise were recognised as the basis of good health’.

The Nazis' relationship with radiotherapy during the 1930s was marked by discriminatory policies targeting Jewish physicians with the revocation of medical licenses. International participation in medical conferences, including those focused on cancer and radiotherapy, showcased the growing importance of these fields.

Dachau concentration camp hosted an experimental herb garden, which the plantation measured about 150 hectares (370 acres) and was the largest medicinal herb garden in Europe at the time. It was part of the Nazis' efforts to reduce medical costs in anticipation of the war. The garden contained a variety of plants, including gladioli, peppergrass, chili, blackcurrant, sage, and thyme. The Nazis systematically tested around a thousand plant varieties, aiming to find cheaper herbal remedies for minor ailments. The herbal remedies were tested on camp inmates.

Heliotherapy was designed for patients at the Speisehaus, a building at the 1936 Berlin Olympic Village. The wide balconies of the Speisehaus were specifically intended for patients’ beds to be rolled outside to benefit from sun therapy. This practice was appreciated by the athletes staying there, as it allowed them to socialize and enjoy outdoor entertainment on the lawn after meals.

== Reception and analysis ==
=== Reception ===
According to German Historian Norbert Frei, the reception of the "New German Medicine" concept among doctors was mixed and often resistant. The National Socialist regime aimed to transform the medical profession into one where physicians were primarily National Socialists and "political soldiers" before being healthcare providers. The focus was to shift from treating individuals to prioritizing the health of the "body of the people." However, the general acceptance of such social Darwinist practices was limited, particularly among those who were not ardent National Socialists. There was little evidence to suggest widespread acceptance of harsh everyday medicine among the population or the medical community in peacetime.

Many Germans, including doctors, supported drastic cuts for "antisocial" individuals but were not enthusiastic about a rigorously social Darwinist approach that also affected them. This concept clashed with the traditional image of physicians as helpers and healers, undermining the trust between patient and doctor. This trust was crucial, as demonstrated by the popularity of general practitioners who maintained high reputations independent of political affiliations. For example, in 1934, Dr. Reichard, a well-liked general practitioner, made offensive remarks against National Socialism without causing disturbances, indicating the population's trust in their doctors over political ideologies. From 1934 to 1943, the number of doctors in the German Reich increased significantly, and most treated their patients in traditional ways, maintaining the established doctor-patient relationship.

In workplaces, however, Nazi demands for maximizing performance often compromised health, and wartime conditions worsened this. Yet, even here, many doctors' traditional values acted as a counterbalance, and complete enforcement of Nazi health policies was not achieved. This disparity between Nazi goals and their implementation highlights the persistence of traditional medical ethics against the regime's ideology.

=== Intentions ===
According to Prof. Dr. Heribert Hofer and Prof. Dr. Hans-Peter Kröner, besides this ideological intention of the New German Medicine, there was also a more tangible one: Many medications of "conventional medicine" relied on the import of certain raw materials that could not be grown in Germany. Therefore, behind the "New German Medicine" was also the economic intention of testing cheaper and, above all, domestic therapeutic agents with the aim of achieving economic self-sufficiency. Ultimately, the ideas of the New German Medicine didn't gain traction. Mainstream medicine, favored by the National Socialists, especially for military purposes, held more sway in the end.

=== Validity of alternative medicine ===
According to Dr. Edzard Ernst, historical evidence suggests that the scientific validation of Contemporary/Alternative medicine (CAM), such as homeopathy, conducted by the Nazi government yielded negative results. Despite this, proponents of alternative medicine persisted in promoting their practices. Ernst highlights the parallels and differences between CAM in the Third Reich and contemporary alternative medicine. He also emphasizes the importance of evidence-based medicine and criticizes the integration of non-evidence-based treatments into conventional medicine.

Ernst argues that the Nazi atrocities stand as unparalleled violations of medical ethics in history. These egregious acts were made possible due to doctors' disregard for fundamental principles of medical ethics. Similarly, the utilization of unproven, debunked, or unsafe treatments on ill-informed patients, as seen in alternative medicine, represents a glaring ethical breach in healthcare. This approach starkly contradicts Hippocrates' foundational dictum of "first do no harm."
