= Riems =

Island in Germany

Native name: Riems
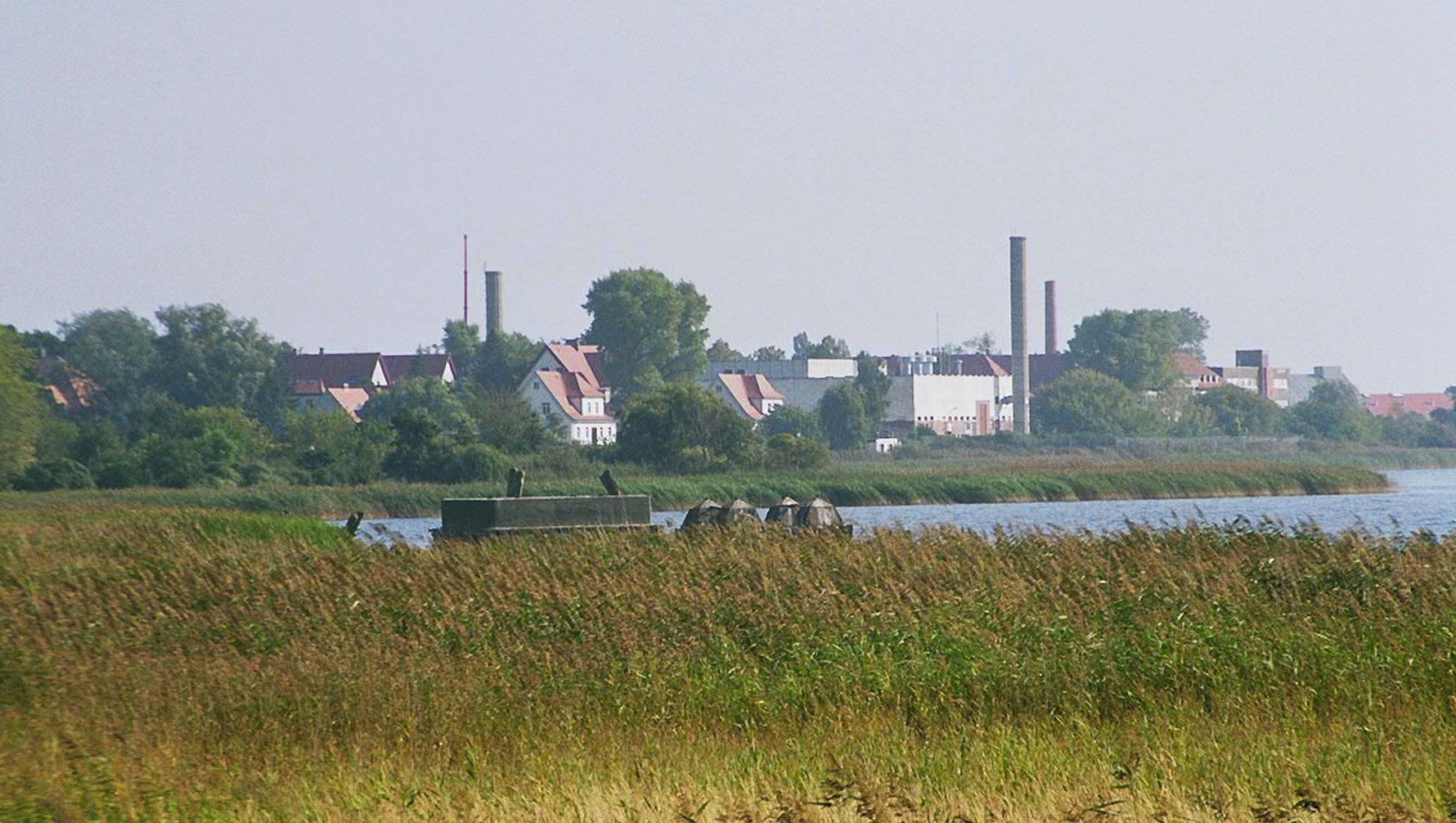

- Location within Germany

Geography
- Location: Baltic Sea
- Coordinates: 54°11′00″N 13°22′00″E
- Total islands: 1
- Length: 300 m (1000 ft)
- Width: 1,250 m (4100 ft)

Administration
- Germany

Riems is an island in the southwestern part of the Bay of Greifswald, a broad, shallow embayment of the Baltic Sea between the German mainland and the island of Rügen. Riems belongs administratively to the urban district of Greifswald, but is an exclave. Riemserort is municipally part of Riems, but lies opposite the island on the mainland.

== Geography ==
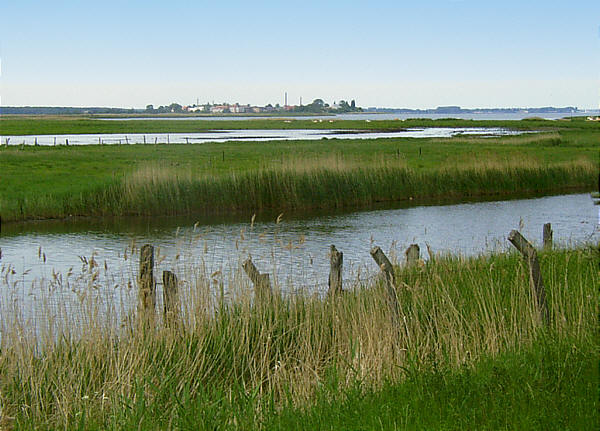
View from the island of Koos over the salt meadows to Riems

The island of Riems measures about 1,250 metres from east to west, and is about 300 metres across at its widest point. Since the early 1970s, it has been connected to the mainland by a 500m long causeway. It has, therefore, been an artificial peninsula for almost 50 years. Before the causeway, a cable car used to transport goods to the mainland. The cable car has now gone, but the ruins of its pylon foundations are still visible. Because the lack of fresh water to the Gristower Wiek resulted in oxygen depletion in the shallow bay, in the autumn of 2007 a 30-metre-long section of the causeway to the island was opened and bridged to allow fresh water to pass.

== Fauna ==
Riems is an important resting and moulting area for waterbirds. The Fahrenbrink Peninsula Nature Reserve (German: Naturschutzgebiet Halbinsel Fahrenbrink) is a recognized reserve. Approximately 15 percent of the northern European waterfowl population spend their winter in the area of the Bay of Greifswald and the Strelasund. It has therefore been declared a European bird reserve.

== History ==
Riems has been inhabited since prehistoric times as Stone Age and Slavic archaeological finds demonstrate. The island later belonged, together with the adjacent village of Gristow, to the family of Dotenberg. Between 1375 and 1382, Riems and Gristow became the possession of the city of Greifswald, which leased the then uninhabited island out as pasture land. After 1820, the city built a homestead but sold it back to its previous tenant in 1883.

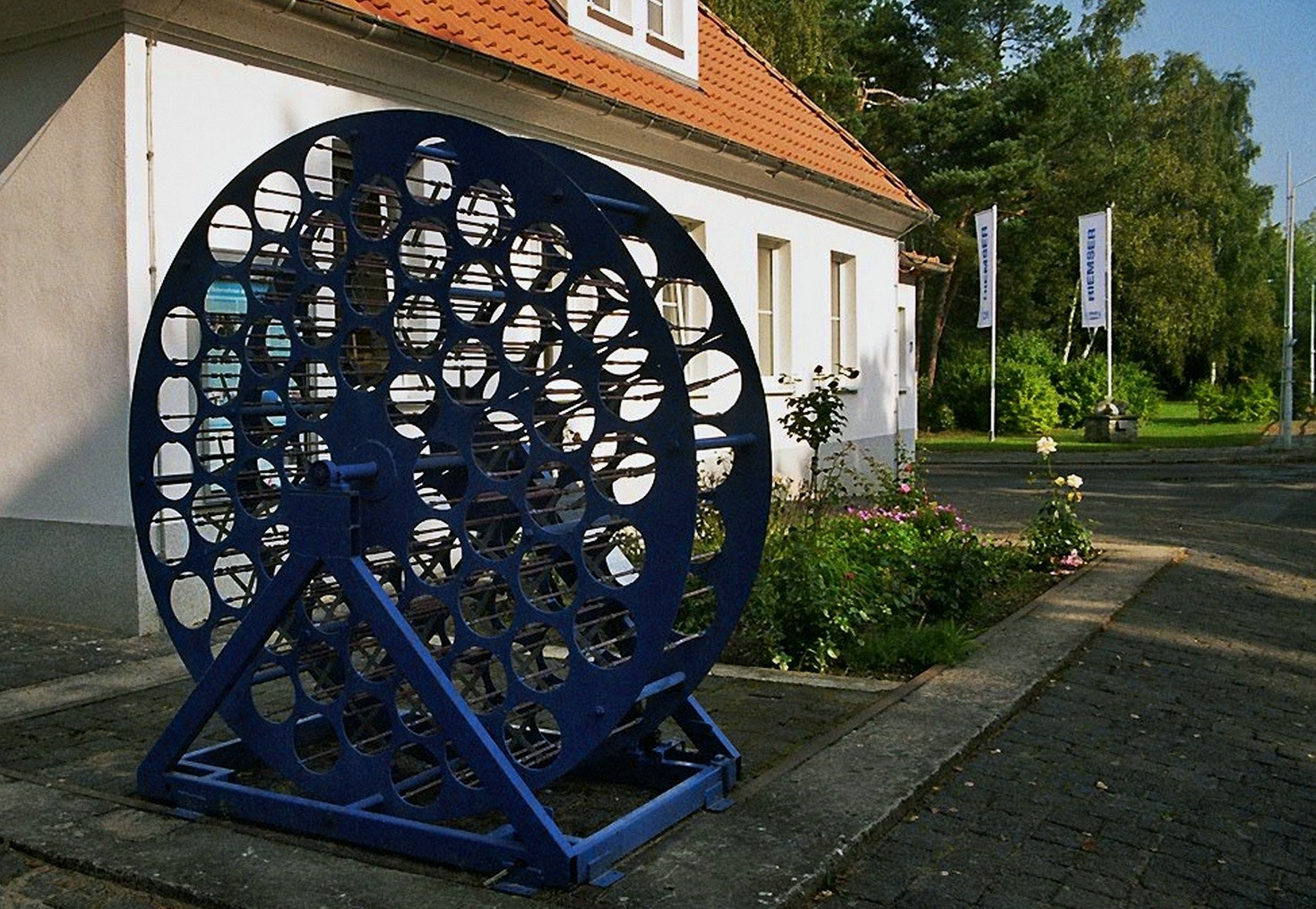
Roll wheel for cell cultures and vaccine production

Riems is home to the oldest virological research institution in the world, now called the Friedrich Loeffler Institute, which was built by Friedrich Loeffler in 1910. Loeffler, a professor at the University of Greifswald, ran filtration tests in 1898 and found that the cause of foot-and-mouth disease was not a bacterium, but a previously unknown class he called "the smallest of all organisms". He had determined it to be a virus. After investigations showed that Loeffler had inadvertently infected the whole region of Greifswald with foot-and-mouth disease he moved to the safer location of his institute on the island of Riems in 1910.

The Third Reich used the institute in Riems to research bioweapons.

While East Germany controlled Riems approximately 800 people were working on vaccine research and development, today there are less than half that number. The population on the island is quite small. There are only 13 houses, five one- or two-family homes and eight apartment buildings, with a total of 62 residential units.

Since 1997, the research complex is the headquarters of the Riemser Friedrich-Loeffler-Institute (FLI). The duties of the FLI include research on animal diseases, such as Bovine spongiform encephalopathy, foot-and-mouth disease and swine fever, and the development of preventive and protective measures against it, especially veterinary vaccines. As of 2006, Riems was working on a vaccine for the avian flu. By 2010, the Institute was to reduce their current locations Tübingen, Wusterhausen and Jena to just Jena and Riems. The total budget for the expansion work is some 150 million €. The construction needed to be handled carefully because of the historically rich old buildings.

The former production plant for animal vaccines was successfully privatized as Riemser Arzneimittel AG. It has about 150 employees.

After the 1990s the populated area in the western part of the island was freely accessible for some years. However, because of the renewed research work with viruses the island is again closed to the public. Quarantine stables and laboratories security levels are level 4. This means employees and visitors to the complex must change their clothes, and shower, when entering and exiting.

== See also ==
- Erich Traub
- Kurt Blome
