= MKNAOMI =

American biological warfare research program

Coordinates: 38°57′06″N 77°08′48″W

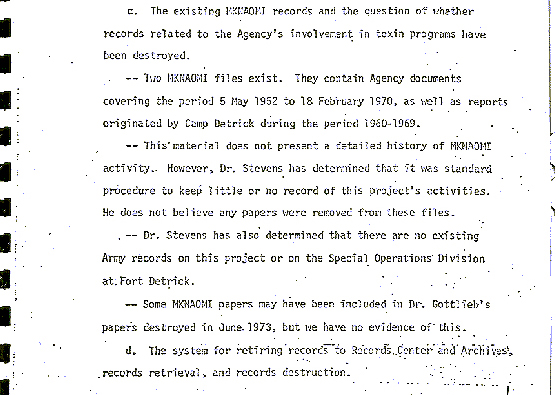
Purported declassified MKNAOMI & MKULTRA documents

MKNAOMI is the code name for a joint Department of Defense/CIA research program from the 1950s through to the 1970s. Unclassified information about the MKNAOMI program and the related Special Operations Division is scarce. It is generally reported to be a successor to the MKULTRA project focusing on biological projects including biological warfare agents—specifically, to store materials that could either incapacitate or kill a test subject and to develop devices for the diffusion of such materials.

During its first twenty years, the CIA engaged in projects designed to increase U.S. biological and chemical warfare capabilities. Project MKNAOMI was initiated to provide the CIA with a covert support base to meet its top-secret operational requirements. The goal was to have a robust arsenal of lethal and incapacitating materials within the CIA's Technical Services Division (TSD). This would enable the TSD to serve as a center for supplying biological and chemical materials.

Surveillance, testing, upgrading and the evaluation of special materials and items were provided by MKNAOMI to ensure that no defects or unwanted contingencies emerged during operational conditions. The U.S. Army's Special Operations Command (SOC) was assigned to assist the CIA with development, testing and maintenance procedures for the biological agents and delivery systems (1952). Both the CIA and SOC modified guns to fire special darts coated with biological agents and poisonous pills. The darts could incapacitate guard dogs, allowing agents to infiltrate the area that the dogs were guarding, and would then be used to awaken the dogs upon exiting the facility. In addition, the SOC was designated to research the potential to use biological agents against other animals and crops.

A 1967 CIA memo which was uncovered by the Church Committee contained evidence of at least three covert techniques for attacking and poisoning crops that had been tested under field conditions. On November 25, 1969, President Richard Nixon banned any military use of biological weapons and Project MKNAOMI was dissolved. On February 14, 1970, a presidential order outlawed all stockpiles of bacteriological weapons and nonliving toxins. However, despite the presidential order, a CIA scientist was able to acquire an estimated 11 grams of deadly shellfish toxin from SOC personnel at Fort Detrick. The toxin was stored in a CIA laboratory where it remained undetected for over five years.

== See also ==
- Human experimentation in the United States
- Project MKULTRA
- Project ARTICHOKE
- Project CHATTER
- CIA cryptonym
- Kurt Blome
- Erich Traub
