= Joint Intelligence Objectives Agency =

Organization

Agency overview
- Formed: 1945
- Dissolved: 1962
- Employees: (members) Army's director of intelligence Chief of Naval Intelligence; Air Staff-2 assistant chief Department of State representative

The Joint Intelligence Objectives Agency (JIOA) was the organization directly responsible for Operation Paperclip, an OSS and Army CIC program for recruiting German scientists for U.S. government employment, primarily from 1945 to 1959. Many were former members and some were former leaders of the Nazi Party. The JIOA was established in 1945, as a subcommittee of the Joint Intelligence Committee (JIC) of the Joint Chiefs of Staff of the United States Armed Forces. The JIOA comprised one representative from each member agency of the JIC, and an operational staff of military intelligence officers from each military service.

The duties of the JIOA included: administrating the Operation Paperclip policies, compiling dossiers (more than 1,500) about Nazi and foreign scientists, engineers, and technicians, and being the liaison to British Intelligence officers executing similar scientific intelligence projects. It also collected, declassified, and distributed reports about German scientific, technical, and industrial intelligence, and the reports of the Combined Intelligence Objectives Subcommittee (CIOS). Moreover, when the CIOS was disbanded, the JIOA assumed much of its work.

The Joint Intelligence Objectives Agency was disbanded in 1962, after seventeen years of service; most of its Nazi scientist dossiers were transferred to the National Archives and Records Administration (NARA). Among the Paperclip dossiers were those of Magnus von Braun (JIOA dossier RG 330, INSCOM dossier C3001437), Georg Rickhey, Arthur Rudolph, and Walter Schreiber. Yet, the Wernher von Braun dossier is unavailable to the public, because it was excluded from the JIOA documents transferred to the NARA, to wit: "Not included among the dossiers is one for rocket scientist Wernher von Braun. It was never transferred to NARA."
