= Jörg Hacker =

German microbiologist

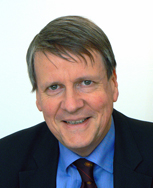
Jörg Hinrich Hacker

Jörg Hinrich Hacker (born 13 February 1952) is a German microbiologist. He served as president of the Robert Koch Institute from 2008 to 2010 and of the German Academy of Sciences Leopoldina from 2010 to 2020. He is the editor-in-chief of the International Journal of Medical Microbiology.

== Early life and education ==
Born in Grevesmühlen, Mecklenburg, Hacker studied biology from 1970 to 1974 at the Martin Luther University in Halle and obtained his PhD in 1979.

== Career ==
From 1980 to 1988 Hacker worked as a junior researcher at the University of Würzburg, where he obtained his habilitation in microbiology in 1986.

From 1988 until 1993, Hacker was professor of microbiology at the University of Würzburg. In 1993 he moved to the chair for Molecular Infection Biology, which he held until 2008. From 2003 to 2009, he was vice president of the Deutsche Forschungsgemeinschaft. From March 2008 to March 2010, he succeeded Reinhard Kurth as president of the Robert Koch Institute.

On 1 October 2009, Hacker was elected president of the German Academy of Sciences Leopoldina. The solemn inauguration ceremony took place on 26 February 2010 and his official starting date was 1 March 2010. In 2020, he was succeeded by Gerald Haug.

In 2011, Hacker was appointed by Chancellor Angela Merkel to the Federal Government’s Ethics Commission on a Safe Energy Supply, co-chaired by Matthias Kleiner and Klaus Töpfer. In 2017, he was part of the selection committee chaired by Jules A. Hoffmann that chose Stewart Cole as director of the Institut Pasteur. From 2017 until 2019, he was a member of the German Ministry of Health’s International Advisory Board on Global Health, chaired by Ilona Kickbusch. In 2022 he received the Robert Koch Medal in Gold.

== Work ==
Hacker's main research interests are the molecular analysis of bacterial pathogens, their spread and variability, as well as their interactions with host cells. From 2001 to 2008 he served as co-coordinator of the BMBF programs PathoGenoMik and PathoGenoMik Plus. Hacker is responsible for coining the term "pathogenicity island" to describe a region of a bacterial genome that encodes disease causing traits.

== Other activities ==
- University of Würzburg, Member of the Board of Trustees (since 2013)
- German Cancer Aid, Member of the Board of Trustees (since 2012)
- Free University of Berlin, Member of the Board of Trustees (since 2012)
- Leibniz Association, Member of the Senate
- Robert Koch Foundation, Member of the Board of Directors (since 1998)
- Centre Virchow-Villermé, Member of the International Advisory Board
- Robert Koch Institute (RKI), Member of the Scientific Advisory Board
- Deutscher Zukunftspreis, Member of the Board of Trustees
- World Health Summit, Member of the Council
- Berlin Institute of Health (BIH), Chairman of the Scientific Advisory Board (2014–2017)
- Federal Institute for Materials Research and Testing (BAM), Member of the Board of Trustees (2013–2017)
- Institut Pasteur, Member of the Scientific Council (2007‐2015)
- University of Marburg, Member of the Board of Trustees (2006–2016)
- Helmholtz Centre for Infection Research, Member of the Supervisory Board (2005–2013)
