= Löffler's medium =

Growth medium used with diphtheria bacilli

Löffler's medium is a special substance used to grow diphtheria bacilli to confirm the diagnosis.

== History ==
In 1887, Friedrich Loeffler devised a culture medium containing horse serum, meat infusion, and dextrose for use in the cultivation of corynebacteria and for differentiating them from other organisms. Perry and Petran suggested modification of the original formulation. Buck, in 1949, described a modified Loeffler's medium for cultivating Corynebacterium diphtheriae.

== Uses ==
This medium has a variety of uses in microbiological investigations. The current formulation incorporated these later modifications:

1. The primary value of Loeffler medium is in the growth and morphological characterization of members of the genus Corynebacterium. This formulation enhances the formation of metachromatic granules within the cells of the organisms.
2. Due to its serum content, Loeffler medium can be used for the determination of proteolytic activities of microorganisms.
3. The gray-white surface of the medium provides an excellent background for the detection and observation of colonial pigmentation.
4. If all extraneous moisture is removed aseptically from the slants and the upper part of the slant is heated until the slant ruptures, this medium can be used for the detection of ascospores.

== Principles of the procedure ==
Heart muscle and animal tissue peptone provide the amino acids and other complex nitrogenous substances necessary to support growth of corynebacteria. Sodium chloride supplies essential ions.

Dextrose is a source of fermentable carbohydrate. The eggs and beef serum cause the medium to coagulate during the sterilization process and are sources of protein which are used for metabolism of the corynebacteria and other organisms.

Approximate formula	Per liter purified water
Beef serum	70.0 g
Heart muscle, infusion from (solids)	0.72 g
Peptic digest of animal tissue	0.71 g
Sodium chloride	0.36 g
Dextrose	0.71 g
Egg (whole, dried)	7.5 g
