= Walter Schreiber =

German physician and general (1893–1970)

- Born: Walter Paul Emil Schreiber; 21 March 1893; Berlin, German Empire
- Died: 5 September 1970 (aged 77); San Carlos de Bariloche, Río Negro Province, Argentina
- Military career
- Allegiance: German Empire, Nazi Germany
- Branch: German Army, Wehrmacht Medical Service
- Service years: 1914–1945
- Rank: Generaloberstabsarzt (Brigadier general)
- Unit: Army Medical Service
- Conflicts: World War I, World War II
- Other work: Physician in Argentina

Walter Paul Emil Schreiber (21 March 1893 – 5 September 1970) was a medical officer with the German Army in World War I and a brigadier-general (Generalarzt) of the Wehrmacht Medical Service during World War II. He would later serve as a key witness against Hermann Göring during the Nuremberg Trials.

== Early life ==
Walter Schreiber was born in Berlin to Paul Schreiber (a postal inspector) and his wife Gertrud Kettlitz. After completing gymnasium in Berlin, he studied medicine at the universities of Berlin, Tübingen, and Greifswald. In 1914, he enlisted voluntarily for military service and served with the 42nd Infantry Regiment in France. He was injured at the First Battle of the Marne. After his recovery, he continued with his studies and served as a provisional doctor on the Western Front until the end of the war in 1918, at which time he was decorated for valor and humanitarian service by three different countries, Finland, Switzerland and Germany. In 1920, he graduated Dr. med. from the University of Greifswald and began his field studies in epidemiology in Africa. After World War I, the United States sought to assess the feasibility of using biological warfare agents in future military conflicts. As a professor of Bacteriology and Hygiene at the University of Berlin and one of the foremost experts in epidemiology, Schreiber was invited to Walter Reed Army Medical Center, then known as Walter Reed General Hospital, in a scientific exchange between Germany and the United States. During this time, he reported on his studies of sleeping sickness in Africa and exchanged strategies with U.S. military medical personnel and researchers on how to prevent biological warfare.

== Nazi Germany ==
As a member of the medical branch of the German Army, and a representative of the Army Medical Inspectorate, he was charged with preventing the spread of infectious disease and developing vaccines, in particular, to guard against potential biological warfare agents. In 1942, he wrote a memorandum expressing his objections to the Third Reich's development of such weapons, stating during his witness testimony at the Nuremberg Trials, "I personally made a report to Generaloberstabsarzt Handloser... It was an extremely serious matter for us physicians, for if there really should be a plague epidemic it was clear that it would not stop at the fronts, but would come over to us too. We had to bear a very grave responsibility." Schreiber repeatedly reported to his supervising officers objections regarding experimentation being done at SS controlled facilities. In October 1942, Schreiber reported what he heard at a conference where the results of human experiments at Dachau concentration camp were presented.

In May 1943, he headed the third session of the advisory specialists of the Armed Forces. This led to a confrontation in which Schreiber spoke out against human experimentation in general, but especially with biological agents such as plague and typhus, testifying later at the Nuremberg Trials that he "pointed out that bacteria were an unreliable and dangerous weapon" but that he was "confronted with a fait accompli", the decision had already been made, "the Führer had given the Reichsmarschall (Hermann Göring) full powers, and so forth, for carrying out all the preparations." In September 1943, Schreiber accepted the position of the commander of the Training Division C of the Military Medical Academy under the authority of which he denied Kurt Blome, the head of the Posen research institute, permission to conduct his plague research in Sachsenburg. This was later overruled by Himmler. At a medical conference May 16 to 18, 1944, Schreiber learned of research into gas gangrene experiments conducted by Dr. Karl Gebhardt at Hohenlychen Sanatorium. (Nuremberg document 619) In 1944, Schreiber, who had grown increasingly aware of Göring's antagonism toward him, conferred with Dr. Karl Brandt, the attorney for the health care scientific advisory board about what to do. At the beginning of April, 1945, he was stripped of his administrative duties except that of medical officer in charge of the military and civilian sector of Berlin.

== Post-war ==
=== Captivity ===
On 30 April 1945, while caring for the wounded in a makeshift hospital in the Reichstag Building in Berlin, he was taken prisoner of war by the Red Army and transported to the Soviet Union. He spent time at Krasnogorsk POW camp and Lubyanka Prison. On 26 August 1946, the Soviets allowed Schreiber to appear as a witness at the Nuremberg Trials, to give evidence against Göring and Kurt Blome, who had been in charge of German offensive biological weapons development. A recording of his testimony at the trial can be found at the online archive of the Imperial War Museum. The transcript became part of the Nuremberg proceedings against German major war criminals. Schreiber himself was not charged with any war crimes at the Nuremberg trials, although he was convicted in absentia by a Polish court of "conducting gruesome medical experiments" at Auschwitz.

In fall 1948, Schreiber escaped Soviet captivity and immediately gave himself over to the Americans. In a press conference on 2 November, he explained that he had initially been held in Lubyanka Prison in the Soviet Union where he became deathly ill. Only when the captured former German ambassador to Soviet Union, Norbert von Baumbach, became ill and refused care from anyone but Schreiber, was the doctor's true identity discovered by Soviet authorities. Schreiber reported he was then given medical attention and moved to a series of safe houses in the Soviet Zone of Germany. There he remained to provide medical care to former Nazi generals. Still under Soviet custody, he was later given the rank of starshina, and was ultimately offered the position of Chief Medical Officer in the newly formed East German Police Force, the Volkspolizei. Rejecting this position, Schreiber reported that he was then offered a professorship at the University of Leipzig. However, in hopes of finding his family, he requested the University of Berlin instead. In response, Soviet authorities reported they were holding Schreiber's family in the Soviet Union, thereby convincing him to relocate and join other German scientists who had already been taken there. In the meantime, his daughter, who had presented herself to Allied military authorities in the American Occupation Zone, learned that the Soviets were transporting more German scientists to the Soviet Union, her father presumably among them. Boarding multiple trains, she walked the cars until she caught her father's attention. Seeing an opportunity, Schreiber evaded his handler and on 17 October took a train from Dresden to Berlin where he presented himself to the Allied Control Authority in West Berlin. Schreiber was subsequently hired to work with the Counter Intelligence Corps and beginning in 1949 was employed as post physician at Camp King, a large clandestine POW interrogation center in Oberursel, Germany.

=== Emigration ===
In 1951, Schreiber was taken to the United States as part of Operation Paperclip. He arrived in New York on September 17, 1951, on the USNS General Maurice Rose with his wife Olga Conrad Schreiber, his son Paul-Gerhard Schreiber, and his mother-in-law, Marie Schulz Conrad. The manifest of the ship does not list travel documents for them, but declares them to be "Paper Clips".

On 7 October 1951, The New York Times reported that he was working at the Air Force School of Medicine at Randolph Air Force Base in Texas in the Department of Preventative Medicine. A Janina Iwańska, who was being treated at Beth Israel Hospital in Boston, was shown a photo of Schreiber and asked if he was one of the scientists who had experimented on her at Ravensbrück concentration camp. She said "no," but that he was there. Her physician contacted The Boston Globe and started a petition to have Schreiber investigated. The second article, also by Drew Pearson, published on February 10, 1952 includes Schreiber's claim that he had never been to Ravensbrück nor any other concentration camp and that he never conducted or supervised any experiments on human beings. That same article also includes a statement by the Air Force Surgeon General stating that he questions such accusations because Schreiber was not a defendant at Nuremberg, but a witness. If there was any evidence against him, they would have included him as a defendant at that time. Schreiber, consequently, did not seek to renew his contract with the U.S. Air Force. Instead he left Texas for the Bay Area of California, where one of his daughters lived. And from there, the Joint Intelligence Objectives Agency arranged visas for him and his family to move to Argentina, where another one of his daughters was living and had recently given birth to Schreiber's first grandchild. On 22 May 1952, they were flown on a military aircraft to New Orleans and from there to Buenos Aires.

In Argentina, he worked as a practitioner of general medicine, essentially as a country doctor, in the community of San Carlos de Bariloche where he settled. He died suddenly of a heart attack on 5 September 1970 in San Carlos de Bariloche, Río Negro, Argentina.
