= Alaküla, Pärnu County =

Village in Estonia

Coordinates: 58°41′18″N 23°47′54″E

Alaküla
- Village
- Interactive map of Alaküla
- Country: Estonia
- County: Pärnu County
- Parish: Lääneranna Parish
- Time zone: UTC+2 (EET)
  - Summer (DST): UTC+3 (EEST)

Alaküla is a village in Lääneranna Parish, Pärnu County, in western Estonia.

== Notable people ==
- Alexander Baron Engelhardt (1885-1960) - physician and historian.
