= International Journal of Medical Microbiology =

- Discipline: Microbiology
- Language: English
- Edited by: Jörg Hacker

Publication details
- Former name: Zentralblatt für Bakteriologie
- History: 1887-present
- Publisher: Urban and Fischer
- Frequency: 8/year
- Impact factor: 4.1 (2022)

Standard abbreviations
- ISO 4: Int. J. Med. Microbiol.

Indexing
- CODEN: IMEMFV
- ISSN: 1438-4221 (print); 1618-0607 (web)
- LCCN: 00244530
- OCLC no.: 44107614

Links
- Journal homepage; Online access

The International Journal of Medical Microbiology, formerly the Zentralblatt für Bakteriologie, is a peer-reviewed medical journal covering research on microbiology published by Elsevier. It was established in 1887 by Friedrich Loeffler. The current editor-in-chief is Sebastian Suerbaum (Max von Pettenkofer-Institut). According to the Journal Citation Reports, the journal has a 2022 impact factor of 4.1.
