= Kurt Blome =

Nazi German scientist (1894–1969)

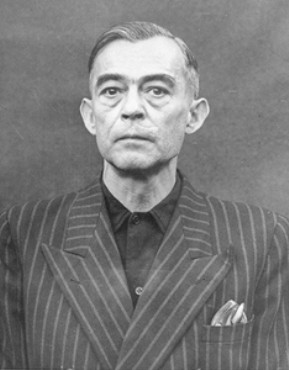
- Blome as defendant in the Doctors' Trial, Nuremberg

Deputy Reich Health Leader
- In office 20 April 1939 – 1945
- Leader: Leonardo Conti
- Preceded by: Hans Deuschl
- Succeeded by: Office abolished

Personal details
- Born: 31 January 1894 Bielefeld, German Empire
- Died: 10 October 1969 (aged 75) Dortmund, West Germany
- Party: Nazi Party
- Scientific career
- Fields: Virologist
- Workplaces: Riems Island, German Reich
- Criminal information
- Status: Acquitted
- Criminal charges: War crimes Crimes against humanity
- Trial: Doctors' Trial

Kurt Blome (31 January 1894 – 10 October 1969) was a high-ranking Nazi scientist before and during World War II. He was the Deputy Reich Health Leader (Reichsgesundheitsführer) and Plenipotentiary for Cancer Research in the Reich Research Council. In his autobiography Arzt im Kampf (A Physician's Struggle), he equated medical and military power in their battle for life and death.

Blome was tried at the Doctors' Trial in 1947 on charges of practicing euthanasia and conducting experiments on humans. He only admitted that he had been ordered in 1943 to experiment with plague vaccines on concentration camp prisoners. In reality, starting in 1943 he "assumed responsibility for all research into biological warfare sponsored by the Wehrmacht" and the SS. Blome was acquitted mainly due to the intervention of the United States as his earlier admissions were well known. It was generally accepted that he had indeed participated in chemical and biological warfare experiments on concentration camp inmates.

After the war, the Western Allied Alsos Mission was notified of his biological warfare research. He worked for the US Central Intelligence Agency's MKUltra human experimentation program, and for the US Chemical Corps under a successor program to Operation Paperclip.

== Early life ==
After attending elementary school and secondary school in Dortmund, Blome graduated from high school in 1912 and then studied medicine. He served in the German Army during World War I. In 1918 or 1919, Blome joined the Freikorps. He also joined Marinebrigade Ehrhardt and Organisation Consul. In 1920, he participated in the Kapp Putsch, in which he was wounded. Blome was an early member of the Nazi Party, which he joined in 1922, and the Sturmabteilung.

== Director of the Nazi biological warfare program ==
As Plenipotentiary for Cancer Research in the Third Reich, Blome had a longstanding interest in the "military use of carcinogenic substances" and cancer-causing viruses. According to Ute Deichmann's book Biologists under Hitler, in 1942 he became director of a unit affiliated with the Central Cancer Institute at the University of Posen (Poznań in Poland, annexed by Germany in 1939). Although he claimed that the work at this institute involved only 'defensive' measures against biological weapons, Heinrich Himmler, Hermann Goering, and Erich Schumann, head of the Wehrmacht's Science Section, strongly supported the offensive use of chemical and biological weapons against Britain, the Soviet Union, and the United States. In 1943, Schumann wrote to Dr. Heinrich Kliewe, one of the Wehrmacht's biological warfare experts that "in particular, America must be attacked simultaneously with various human and animal epidemic pathogens as well as plant pests." According to Kliewe, plague, typhoid, cholera and anthrax were being developed as weapons, as well as a new "synthetic medium for the spread of these bacteria" which would allow them to remain virulent for eight to twelve weeks.

As part of the Nazi biological warfare program code-named Blitzableiter (Lightning Rod), Blome's institute was therefore "a camouflaged operation for the production of biological warfare agents", and its construction was overseen by Karl I. Gross, an S.S. officer and specialist in tropical diseases, who had conducted lethal experiments on 1,700 prisoners at the Mauthausen concentration camp. It was surrounded by a ten-foot-high wall, guarded by a special S.S. unit, and designed to prevent the accidental release of the various biological agents being produced there. By May 1944, the institute had sections devoted to physiology-biology, bacteriology and vaccines, radiology, pharmacology, cancer statistics, and a tumor farm, and had received at least 2.7 million Reichsmarks in funding from the Wehrmacht and S.S. in 1943–45.

Blome worked on methods of storage and dispersal of biological agents like plague, cholera, anthrax, and typhoid, and also infected prisoners with plague in order to test the efficacy of vaccines. At the University of Strassburg, a "special unit" headed by Prof. Eugen von Haagen and employing researchers like Kurt Gutzeit and Arnold Dohmen, tested typhus, hepatitis, nephritis, and other chemical and biological weapons on concentration camp inmates. Gutzeit was in charge of hepatitis research for the German Army, and he and his colleagues carried out virus experiments on mental patients, Jews, Russian POWs and Gypsies in Sachsenhausen, Auschwitz and other locations. In October 1944, Himmler also ordered Blome to experiment with plague on concentration camp prisoners.

=== Use of insect vectors in biological warfare ===
In 1943, Blome proposed spreading malaria "artificially by means of mosquitoes" and experimented on prisoners at Dachau and Buchenwald with lice to cause typhus epidemics. Eduard May, director of the Entomological Division of the SS Institute for Practical Research in Military Science, received a commission to experiment on concentration camp prisoners with "humanly harmful insects" starting in October 1943, which was closely connected with Blome's biological warfare program. May collaborated with him in experiments on "the artificial mass transmission of the malaria parasite to humans", with infected mosquitoes dropped from planes. In addition, the Wehrmacht's Veterinary Section, which included research projects on animal diseases being conducted by Erich Traub at the Insel Riems (Riems Island) Institute, was developing methods to spread these by aircraft over Britain, the U.S., and the Soviet Union. Like Kurt Blome's cancer research institute in Posen, the State Research Institute at Insel Riems was a dual-use facility during the Second World War, where at least some biological warfare experiments were conducted. It was founded in 1909–10 to study foot-and-mouth disease and by World War II employed about 20 scientists and a staff of about 70–120. From 1919 to 1948, its director was Otto Waldmann. Hans-Christoph Nagel, a veterinarian and biological warfare expert for the German Army, was in charge of research into the use of animal and insect diseases as biological weapons. Like Blome, Traub was also employed by the U.S. government after the war as a biological warfare expert.

=== Insecticides and experiments with nerve gas ===
Blome also worked on aerosol dispersants and methods of spraying nerve agents like Tabun and Sarin from aircraft, and tested the effects of these gases on prisoners at Auschwitz. I.G. Farben had developed nerve gas in 1936 as a result of its research into insecticides, and Blome's duties included preparing defensive measures against possible Allied use of insect-borne biological weapons, either in a first strike or in retaliation for German use of such weapons. As early as September 1940, Wolfram Sievers, director of the SS Ahnenerbe Institute, had warned Blome of the need to expand the production of insecticides to deal with this eventuality. This led Blome to experiment with the dispersal of insecticides, fungicides, and nerve gas from aircraft, especially after Hitler had ordered a "drastic increase" in the production of Tabun and Sarin at I.G. Farben's Dyhernfurth factory in eastern Germany. On orders from Himmler in 1944, Blome also tested these on inmates at Auschwitz.

=== Flight from the Poznan Institute ===
Blome fled from Posen in January 1945 just ahead of the Red Army, and was unable to have the facilities destroyed. He informed Walter Schreiber, head of the Wehrmacht's Military Medical Inspectorate, that he was "very concerned that the installations for human experiments that were in the institute and recognizable as such, would be very easily identified by the Russians." He relocated to the town of Geraberg in Thuringia, where the Wehrmacht and SS had already constructed another biological warfare facility disguised as a cancer research institute. Blome brought his biological cultures with him from Poland and was still promising Hitler a Wunderwaffe or 'miracle weapon' that would turn the tide of war in Germany's favor, but the Geraburg facility was captured by the U.S. Army in April 1945, along with its records and equipment.

== Collaboration with Unit 731 and the Japanese biological warfare program ==
Throughout the war, the German and Japanese biological warfare programs exchanged information, samples, and equipment by submarine. The last of these submarines departed from Japan as late as May 1945. The Japanese destroyed many of the records about these contacts and the biological warfare program before their surrender in August 1945. In the 1930s, Hitler had ordered a group of officers led by Otto Muntsch to study Japan's use of chemical and biological weapons against China. These programs of scientific cooperation and exchange were formalized in a series of agreements in 1938–39. Hojo Enryo, a Japanese Army doctor and expert in biological weapons, "frequently visited the Robert Koch Institute as well as companies under German occupation to collect information about research on bacteriological warfare" and gave a lecture on this subject at the Berlin Military Academy of Medicine in October 1941. Gerhard Rose, who was "the German expert on tropical diseases and epidemic typhus" and later a defendant at the Nuremberg Doctors Trial, supplied samples of the yellow fever virus to Unit 731 that they had been unable to obtain from the United States. Blome's own institute in Posen was very similar in design to Unit 731's facility in Pingfan, Manchuria.

== Postwar activities and employment by the United States ==
Blome was arrested in Munich on 17 May 1945 by the United States Counter Intelligence Corps (an army intelligence service). He had no papers except his driving license. After some weeks of custody, during which the CIC checked on his identity, Blome was taken to Kransberg Castle (a medieval castle north of Frankfurt). After his arrival at the castle a secret message was transmitted to Operation Alsos, an Anglo-American team of experts, tasked with investigating the state of German and Italian weapons technology towards the end of the war:

In 1943 Blome was studying bacteriological warfare, although officially he was involved in cancer research, which was however only a camouflage. Blome additionally served as deputy health minister of the Reich. Would like you to send investigators?"

It is believed that American intervention saved Blome from the gallows in exchange for information about biological warfare, nerve gas, and providing advice on to the American chemical and biological weapons programs. In November 1947, two months after his Nuremberg acquittal, Blome was interviewed by four representatives from Camp Detrick, Maryland, including H.W. Batchelor, in which he "identified biological warfare experts and their location and described different methods of conducting biological warfare."

Blome was hired by Sidney Gottlieb to work on the MK-Ultra program.

In 1951, he was hired by the U.S. Army Chemical Corps under Project 63, one of the successors to Operation Paperclip, to work on chemical warfare. His file neglected to mention Nuremberg. Denied a visa by the U.S. Consul in Frankfurt, he was employed at the European Command Intelligence Center at Oberursel, West Germany. He worked there on a never-declassified top secret project labeled in Blome's foreign scientist case file as "Army, 1952, Project 1975".

He was not arrested or charged with war crimes again after his acquittal at the Nuremberg Doctors' Trial in 1947. He also continued to practice medicine in West Germany and was active in politics as a member of the national-conservative German Party. He died in Dortmund in 1969.

== Works ==
- "Krebsforschung und Krebsbekämpfung". Ziel und Weg. Die Gesundheitsführung Nr. 11 (1940) S. 406–412
- Arzt im Kampf: Erlebnisse und Gedanken. – Leipzig: Barth, 1942

== See also ==
- Erich Traub
- Claus Schilling
- Doctors' Trial
- Nazi human experimentation
- Operation Paperclip
- U.S. intelligence involvement with German and Japanese war criminals after World War II
- Project MKULTRA
- Project MKNAOMI
- Project MKDELTA
- Sigmund Rascher
- Fort Detrick
- Anthrax
- Typhus
- Malaria
- Hepatitis
- Plague (disease)
- Nephritis
- Nerve gas
- I.G. Farben
- Gerhard Rose
- Unit 731

== Bibliography ==
- Jacobsen, Annie. Operation Paperclip: The Secret Intelligence Program that Brought Nazi Scientists to America. Little, Brown. 11 February 2014. ISBN 978-0-316-22105-4.
- McCoy, Alfred W. Science in Dachau's Shadow: Hebb, Beecher, and the Development of CIA Psychological Torture and Modern Medical Ethics. Journal of the History of the Behavioral Sciences. Volume 143 (4), 2007.
