= Friedrich Loeffler Institute =

Animal disease research center in Germany

Coordinates: 54°10′58″N 13°21′47″E

The Friedrich-Loeffler-Institut (FLI), is the federal institute for animal health of Germany, the country's leading animal disease center. The institute was founded in 1910 and named for its founder, bacteriologist Friedrich Loeffler, in 1952. The FLI is situated on the Isle of Riems, which belongs to the city of Greifswald. Riems is a very small island that can be reached via a dam, which can be closed off in case of an outbreak.

The Friedrich Loeffler Institute is directly subordinated to the German Federal Ministry of Agriculture, Food and Regional Identity. Its main subject is the thorough study of livestock health and other closely related subjects including molecular biology, diagnosis of viral infections, immunology, and epidemiology. German federal law holds the FLI responsible for national and international animal disease control; it is also the national reference lab for several viral diseases. The institute publishes its research, and cooperates with other national and international institutions and researchers.

Among the animal diseases under research are for instance foot and mouth disease, mad cow disease, and avian influenza.

As of 2024, 330 people work for the FLI, and an additional 140 will be employed upon completion of the construction work. The federal government spent €260 million to construct new laboratories and barns on its campus.

As part of this extension, the Riems Institute completed Biosafety level 4 laboratory facilities in 2010, which enabled research activities on the most dangerous of viruses—one of four such facilities in Germany.

== Organisation ==
The institution is managed by President Prof. Dr. Christa Kühn and vice-President Prof. Dr. Martin Beer, head of the Institute of Diagnostic Virology (IVD).

The FLI consists of the following twelve institutions at seven different locations:

- Riems:
  - Institute of Infectology (IMED)
  - Institute of Molecular Virology and Cell Biology (IMVZ)
  - Institute of Diagnostic Virology (IVD)
  - Institute of Novel and Emerging Infectious Diseases (INNT)
  - Institute of Immunology (IfI)
  - Institute of Epidemiology (IfE)
  - Institute of International Animal Health/One Health (IITG)
- Braunschweig
  - Institute of Animal Nutrition (ITE)
- Celle:
  - Institute of Animal Welfare and Animal Husbandry (ITT)
- Jena:
  - Institute of Bacterial Infections and Zoonoses (IBIZ)
  - Institute of Molecular Pathogenesis (IMP)
- Mariensee
  - Institute of Farm Animal Genetics (ING)

== FLI Late Scientists ==
- Günther M. Keil, Institute of Molecular Virology and Cell Biology (IMVZ).
