= Friedrich Loeffler =

German bacteriologist (1852–1915)

Friedrich August Johannes Loeffler
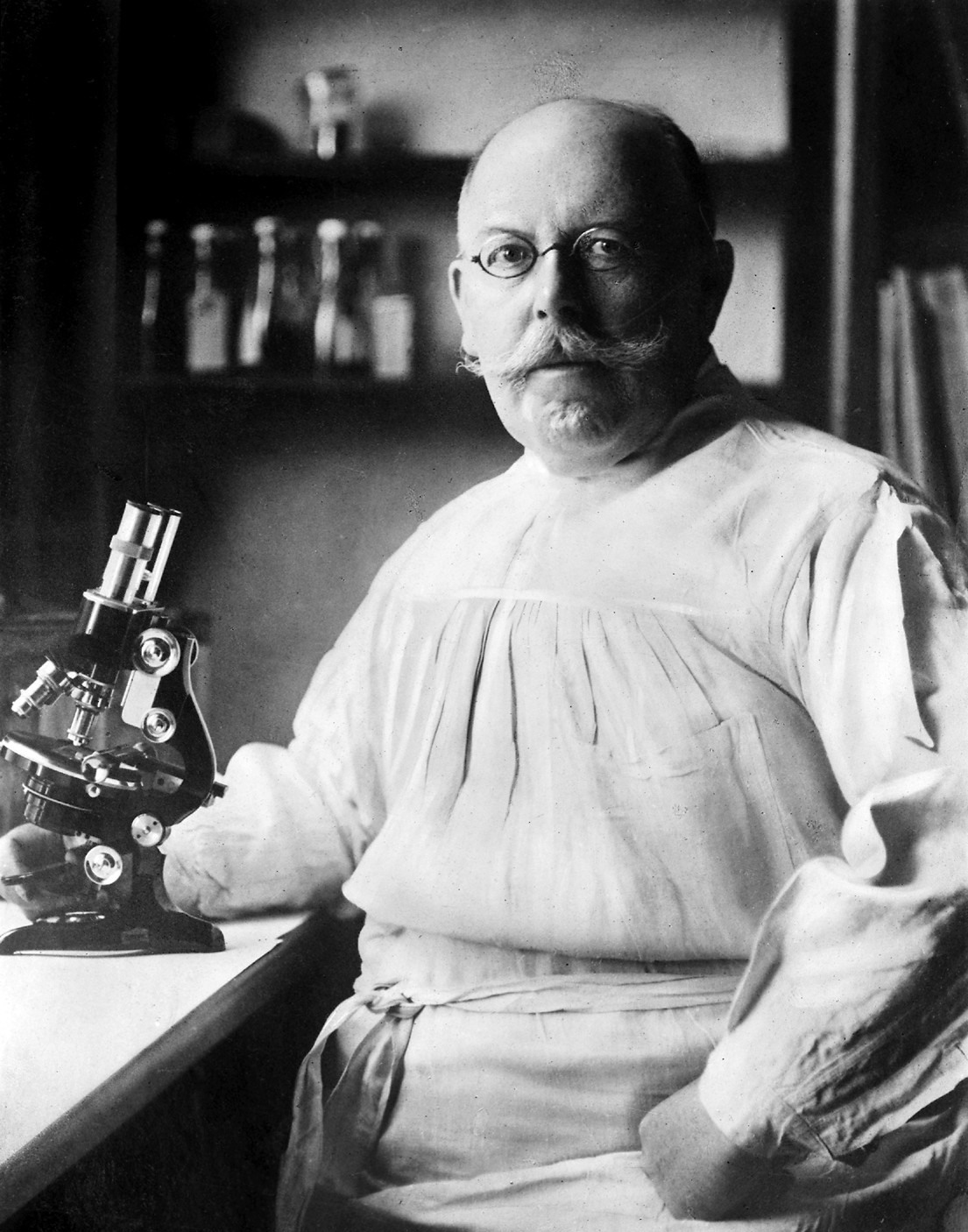
- Friedrich August Johannes Loeffler
- Born: 24 June 1852; Frankfurt (Oder), Kingdom of Prussia
- Died: 9 April 1915 (aged 62); Berlin, German Empire
- Education: University of Würzburg; University of Berlin
- Known for: Corynebacterium diphtheriae Aphthovirus
- Scientific career
- Fields: Bacteriology
- Workplaces: University of Greifswald; Friedrich Loeffler Institute

Friedrich August Johannes Loeffler (German: [ˈlœflɐ]; 24 June 1852 – 9 April 1915) was a German bacteriologist at the University of Greifswald.

== Biography ==
He obtained his M.D. degree from the University of Berlin in 1874. He worked with Robert Koch from 1879 to 1884 as an assistant in the Imperial Health Office in Berlin. In 1884, he became staff physician at the Friedrich Wilhelm Institute in Berlin, and four years later became professor at the University of Greifswald.

His development of original methods of staining rendered an important and lasting service to bacteriology. Early in his career, he began a study of parasitic diseases. Among his discoveries was the organism causing diphtheria (Corynebacterium diphtheriae) and the cause of foot-and-mouth disease (Aphthovirus). His description of the diphtheria bacillus, published in 1884, was the originating cause of an antitoxin treatment. He also created Löffler's serum, a coagulated blood serum used for the detection of the bacteria. In 1887, he founded the Centralblatt für Bakteriologie und Parasitenkunde.

The Friedrich Loeffler Institute on the Isle of Riems near Greifswald, as well as the Friedrich Loeffler Institute of Medical Microbiology at the Greifswald Medical School of the University of Greifswald, have been named in his honor.

== Selected publications ==
- with Robert Koch and Georg Theodor August Gaffky: Ueber die Verwerthbarkeit heißer Wasserdämpfe zu Desinfectionszwecken. (On the effectiveness of hot water vapors for purposes of disinfection) In: Mitteilungen aus dem Kaiserlichen Gesundheitsamte. 1, 1881, pp. 322–340.
- Vorlesungen über die geschichtliche Entwicklung der Lehre von den Bakterien. (Lectures on the historical development of the theory of bacteria) Leipzig 1887.
- with Paul Frosch: Summarische Bericht über die Ergebnisse der Untersuchungen der Kommission zur Erforschung der Maul- und Klauenseuche bei dem Institut für Infektionskrankheiten in Berlin. (Summary report on the results of the investigations by the Commission for Research into Foot and Mouth Disease at the Institute for Infectious Diseases in Berlin) In: Centralblatt für Bakteriologie und Parasitenkunde. volume 22, 1897, pp. 257–259 (part 1), and volume 23, 1898, pp. 371–391 (part 2).
- Zur Immunitätsfrage. (On the question of immunity) In: Mitteilungen aus dem Kaiserlichen Gesundheitsamte. 1, 1882, pp. 134–187.
- Untersuchungen über die Bedeutung der Mikroorganismen für die Entstehung der Diphtherie beim Menschen, bei der Taube und beim Kalbe. (Investigations into the importance of microorganisms for the development of diphtheria in humans, pigeons and calves) In: Mitteilungen aus dem Kaiserlichen Gesundheitsamte. 2, 1884, pp. 421–499.
