= Leonardo Conti =

Reich Health Leader and SS-Obergruppenführer in Nazi Germany (1900–1945)

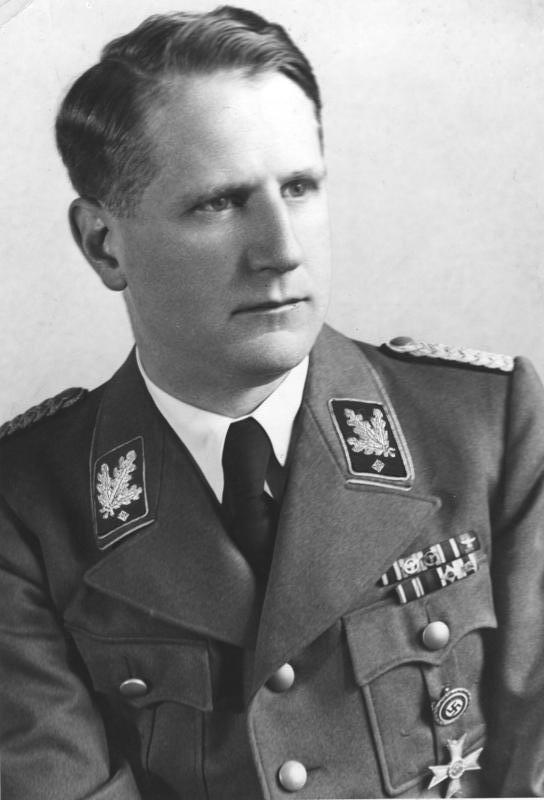
- Conti in 1939

Reich Health Leader
- In office 20 April 1939 – August 1944
- Deputy: Kurt Blome
- Preceded by: Gerhard Wagner
- Succeeded by: Office abolished

Personal details
- Born: 24 August 1900 Lugano, Ticino, Switzerland
- Died: 6 October 1945 (aged 45) Nuremberg Prison, Bavaria, Allied-occupied Germany
- Cause of death: Suicide by hanging
- Party: Nazi Party
- Parent: Nanna Conti (mother)
- Education: University of Erlangen–Nuremberg
- Profession: Physician

Military service
- Allegiance: German Empire; Nazi Germany
- Branch/service: Imperial German Army; Schutzstaffel
- Years of service: 1918–1919; 1930–1945
- Rank: SS-Obergruppenführer

Leonardo Conti (German pronunciation: [ˈleːonaʁdo ˈkɔnti]; 24 August 1900 – 6 October 1945) was the Reich Health Leader and an SS-Obergruppenführer in Nazi Germany. He was involved in the planning and execution of Action T4 that murdered hundreds of thousands of adults and children with severe mental and physical handicaps. On 19 May 1945, after Germany's surrender, Conti was imprisoned and in October hanged himself to avoid trial.

== Early life ==
Conti was born on 24 August 1900 in Lugano, in the Swiss canton of Ticino, to a Swiss Italian father, Silvio Conti, and a German mother, Nanna Pauli, who later became the Reich Midwifery Leader in Nazi Germany. His father was a postal worker hailing from Monteggio. Conti's parents divorced in 1903. He attended elementary school in Switzerland and the Friedrich Wilhelm Gymnasium in Berlin. In the summer of 1918, he volunteered for military service in the First World War with the Imperial German Army's 54th Field Artillery Regiment in Küstrin (today, Kostrzyn nad Odrą). However, he did not see any combat before the war ended in November.

Returning to school, Conti then studied medicine at the Humboldt University of Berlin and the University of Erlangen–Nuremberg. He was active in the national student movement and in right-wing politics. He became involved in the völkisch movement and co-founded the antisemitic combat association, Deutscher Volksbund. He took part in the Kapp Putsch in 1920 as a member of the Marinebrigade Ehrhardt. After it was disbanded in May 1922, he followed its leader Hermann Ehrhardt into the ultra-nationalist and antisemitic terrorist organization Organisation Consul. After this organization was banned by the government in July 1922, Conti enrolled in the Viking League, another right-wing group committed to the overthrow of the Weimar Republic. He was also involved with the Deutschvölkischer Schutz- und Trutzbund, the largest and most active antisemitic organization in Germany. He passed his state medical examinations in November 1923 and joined the Sturmabteilung (SA) in Erlangen that year, becoming their first physician in Berlin. He obtained his license to practice medicine in 1925 and moved to Munich where he worked as a general practitioner and a paediatrician.

== Nazi career ==
In 1927, Conti moved back to Berlin and joined the Nazi Party on 20 December (membership number 72,225). He was appointed the SA physician for Standarte V and was placed in charge of organizing the SA medical services in Berlin. From 1929 to 1930 he was the senior physician in SA-Gruppe Ost. He also founded the Berlin branch of the National Socialist German Doctors' League, (NSDÄB). In February 1930, he was called upon to treat Horst Wessel, an SA member who was shot by members of the Communist Party of Germany and whose death was exploited by Joseph Goebbels in a propaganda campaign to elevate him into a martyr of the Nazi movement. However, in September 1930, Conti, who had reached the rank of SA-Oberführer, was expelled from the SA when he came into conflict with Walter Stennes, at that time the commander of SA-Gruppe Ost.

Conti joined the SS on 16 November 1930 (member number 3982) and became the senior doctor for SS-Gruppe Ost. In May 1932, Conti was elected as a Nazi deputy to the Landtag of Prussia where he served until it was dissolved on 14 October 1933. After the Nazi seizure of power, Conti was given a number of official positions in the German government, mostly in the areas of medicine and health. On 12 April 1934, he was appointed by Hermann Göring to the Prussian State Council. He was placed in charge of all medical arrangements for the 1936 Berlin Olympics. On 1 April 1936, he was assigned to the personal staff of Reichsführer-SS Heinrich Himmler. In 1937 Conti was elected to the presidency of the FIMS, the International Federation of Sports Medicine. The FIMS today considers this to have been "a black page" in their history. Conti also played a role in the banning of Jewish physicians from medical practice. In an interview in 1938, he declared: "It is only the elimination of the Jewish element which provides for the German doctor the living space due to him."

On 20 April 1939, Conti was appointed Reich Health Leader, President of the NSDÄB and head of the Main Office of Public Health; he was granted the Party rank of Hauptdienstleiter. This was followed on 28 August by Adolf Hitler appointing him State Secretary for Public Health and Nursing in the Reich and Prussian Ministry of the Interior. Conti attempted to have the use of the methamphetamine Pervitin (see History and culture of substituted amphetamines) restricted by the Wehrmacht, which had been issuing millions of tablets to their soldiers and airmen. In July 1941 Conti succeeded in having Pervitin added to the list of restricted substances but only a warning was issued to the military. On 27 August 1941, Conti was appointed to the Reichstag as a deputy from Ostmark, succeeding Josef Leopold who had been killed on the eastern front. On 1 October 1941 Conti was promoted to SS-Gruppenführer and attained the rank of SS-Obergruppenführer on 20 April 1944.

=== Action T4 ===
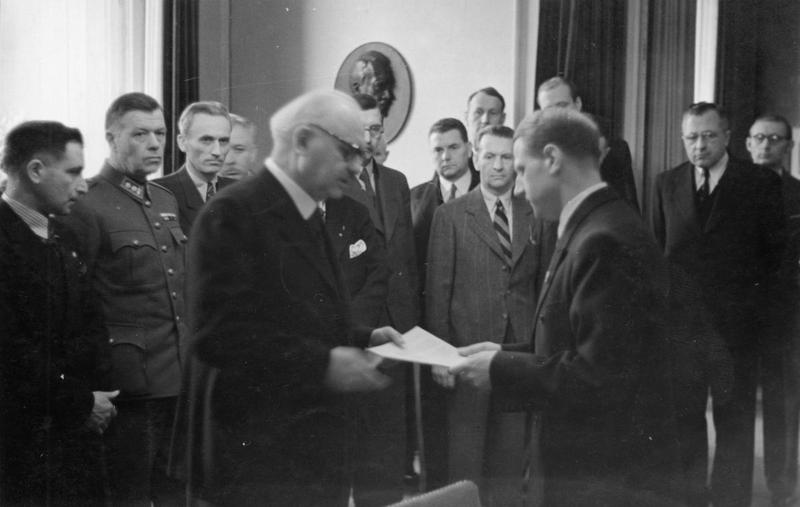
Conti being presented with a report on the Katyn massacre discovered by the Germans in 1943

Conti was a staunch promoter of a public medical administration strongly controlled by the Nazi state. Under his leadership, local health offices were further expanded to allow for genetic control and selection of the population in order to remove "weak" elements for the improvement of the German race, a doctrine known as eugenics. The various programmes were the basis for "racial hygiene" a lethal part of the Nazi philosophy. Conti worked with Dr. Karl Brandt to draft plans for the extermination of all Germany's mental patients along with those suffering from severe physical handicaps. This program, known euphemistically as Action T4, is estimated to have killed over 200,000 adults and children between 1939 and 1945. Conti was initially placed in charge of this initiative but soon was replaced by Philip Bouhler.

Accordingly, he was co-responsible for the forced sterilization program, the racially motivated forced pregnancy interruptions, and ultimately the Action T4 euthanasia program. It is also undisputed that Conti participated in human experiments. Conti was also involved in the forensic investigation into the Katyn massacre, and received a detailed report, known as the Katyn Commission on the discovery from an international team of experts.

=== SS ranks ===
SS ranks
Date	Rank
12 June 1933	SS-Standartenführer
20 April 1935	SS-Oberführer
30 January 1938	SS-Brigadeführer
1 October 1941	SS-Gruppenführer
20 April 1944	SS-Obergruppenführer

== Post-war imprisonment and suicide ==
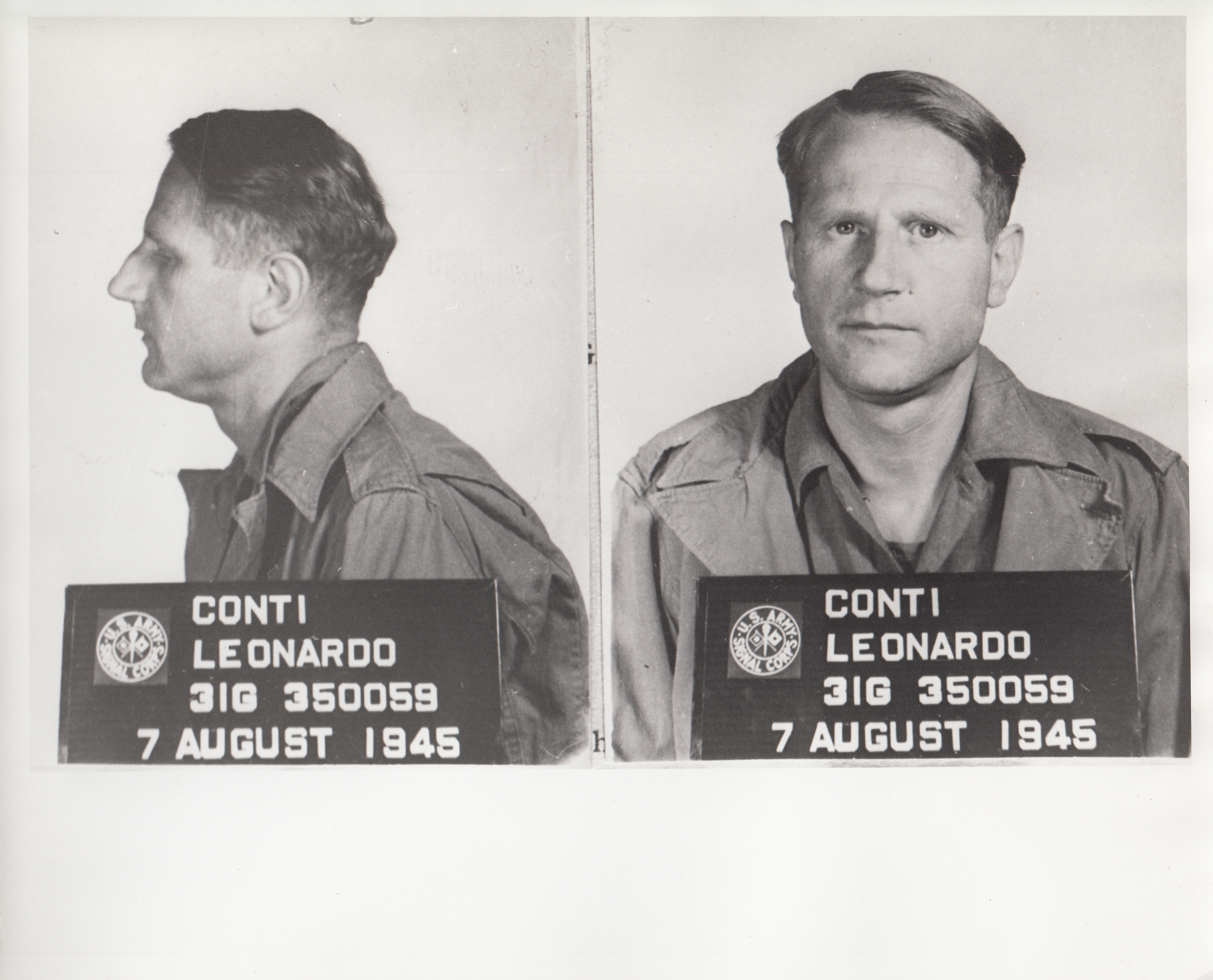
Conti's mugshot, after arrested by U.S. Army

On 19 May 1945, after Germany's surrender, Conti was arrested by the British in Flensburg and was imprisoned and held as a witness for the Nuremberg trials. He would have been brought to the Doctors' Trial for his involvement in Action T4. However, on 6 October 1945, Conti hanged himself in his Nuremberg cell. On 1 May 1959, his estate was fined 3000 Deutsche Marks by the Berlin denazification tribunal.

== See also ==
- Register of SS leaders in general's rank
