= National Socialist German Doctors' League =

Division of the Nazi Party (1929–1945)

- Nationalsozialistischer Deutscher Ärztebund
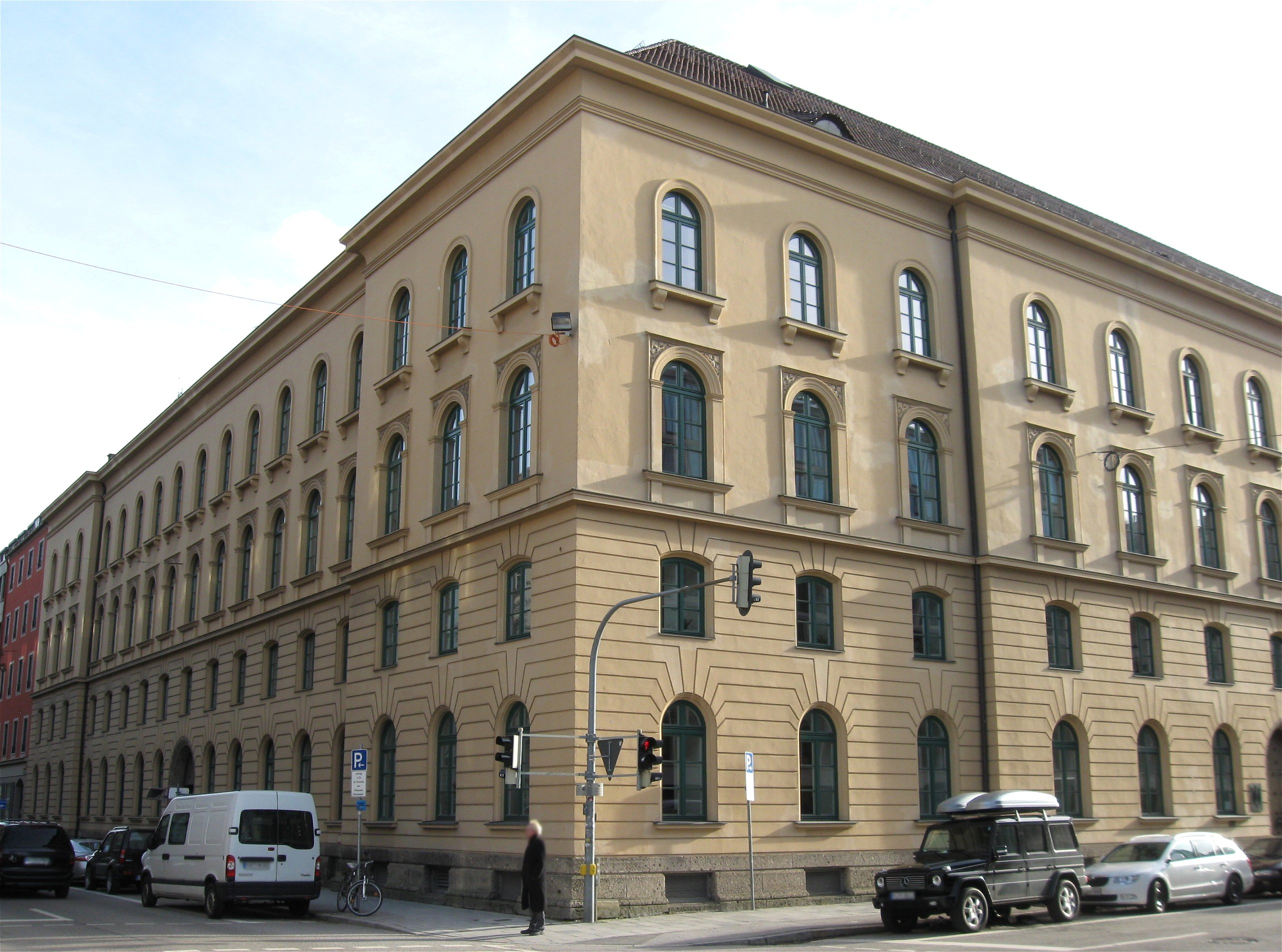
- League's former headquarters in Munich (photo taken in 2013)
- Formation: 1929
- Dissolved: 1945
- Legal status: Defunct, illegal
- Region served: Nazi Germany
- Parent organization: Nazi Party

The National Socialist German Doctors' League (Nationalsozialistischer Deutscher Ärztebund, abbreviated as NSDÄB or NSD-Ärztebund) was a division of the Nazi Party with the mission of integrating the German medical profession within the framework of the Nazi worldview. The organisation was headquartered in Munich. The League was organized (as with other departments of the Nazi Party) strictly in accord with the Führerprinzip ("leader principle") as well as the principle of Machtdistanz ("power distance"). The League was led by the Reich Health Leader (Reichsärzteführer).

== History ==
The National Socialist German Doctors' League was founded by the Nazi Party on August 3, 1929 on the initiative of the doctor and publisher Ludwig Liebl. He was also the first chairman, with his tenure lasting three years. The NSDÄB's self-image was not that of a representative body, but of a combat organisation. As such, the League developed the essential "scientific" foundations of Nazi health policy, which culminated in the racial hygiene concept of annihilation of the "life unworthy of life".

The NSDÄB's organizational structure followed that of the Nazi Party. Gerhard Wagner had been the leader of the NSDÄB since 1932, and in 1934 he received the title of Reich Health Leader (Reichsärzteführer). In 1935, he enforced the rigorous synchronization of the medical associations and contributed to the drafting of the Nuremberg Laws. Wagner's proposals included a forced separation of "mixed marriages" and a marriage ban for "quarter Jews"; however, these were not included in the law after Hitler's intervention. After Wagner's sudden death in 1939 at the age of 50, Leonardo Conti took over his position. The NSDÄB ceased operations for the duration of the war on October 13, 1942, when it had around 46,000 members.

After Germany's defeat in World War II, the Nazi Party, its divisions and affiliated groups were declared "criminal organizations" and banned by the Allied Control Council on October 10, 1945. Conti, who was to be held accountable for his participation in the Nazi Action T4 in the Nuremberg Trials, hanged himself in his prison cell in October 1945.

== Reich Health Leaders ==
- 1934-1939: Gerhard Wagner (1888-1939), German doctor, Reich Health Leader
- 1933-1939: Hans Deuschl (1891-1953), German doctor, Deputy Reich Health Leader
- 1939 to August 1944: Leonardo Conti (1900-1945), German-Swiss doctor, Reich Health Leader
- 1939-probably 1945: Kurt Blome (1894-1969), German doctor, Deputy Reich Health Leader

== See also ==
- Nazi eugenics
