= Gemeinnützige Krankentransport GmbH =

Nazi eugenics subdivision

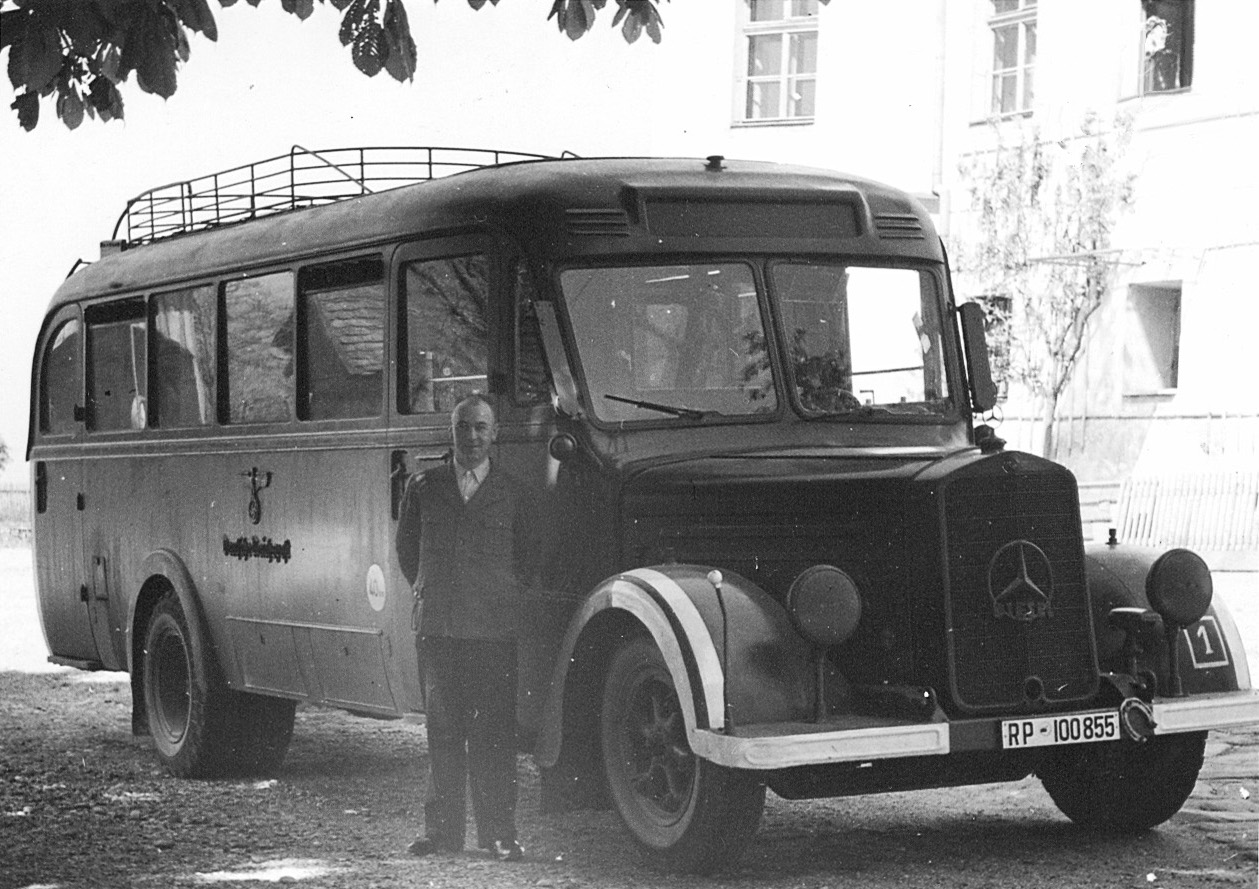
Gekrat bus and driver

The Gemeinnützige Krankentransport GmbH (German: [ɡəˈmaɪnˌnʏtsɪɡə ˈkʁankŋ̍ˌtʁanspɔʁt ɡeːʔɛmbeːˈhaː]; known as "Gekrat" or "GeKraT", commonly translated as "Charitable Ambulance") was a subdivision of the Action T4 organization. The euphemistically named company transported sick and disabled people to the Nazi killing centers to be murdered under the Nazi eugenics program and was known for the gray buses it used. The many victims were murdered in sealed gas chambers with carbon monoxide gas supplied in metal gas cylinders, and fed through false spray heads appearing to be shower heads. The programme Aktion T4 was managed by Viktor Brack, who was tried for his crimes at Nuremberg, and executed as a result. The operation was ordered by Adolf Hitler in early September 1939, and organized by Philip Bouhler and Karl Brandt of the Reich Chancellery.

== Background ==
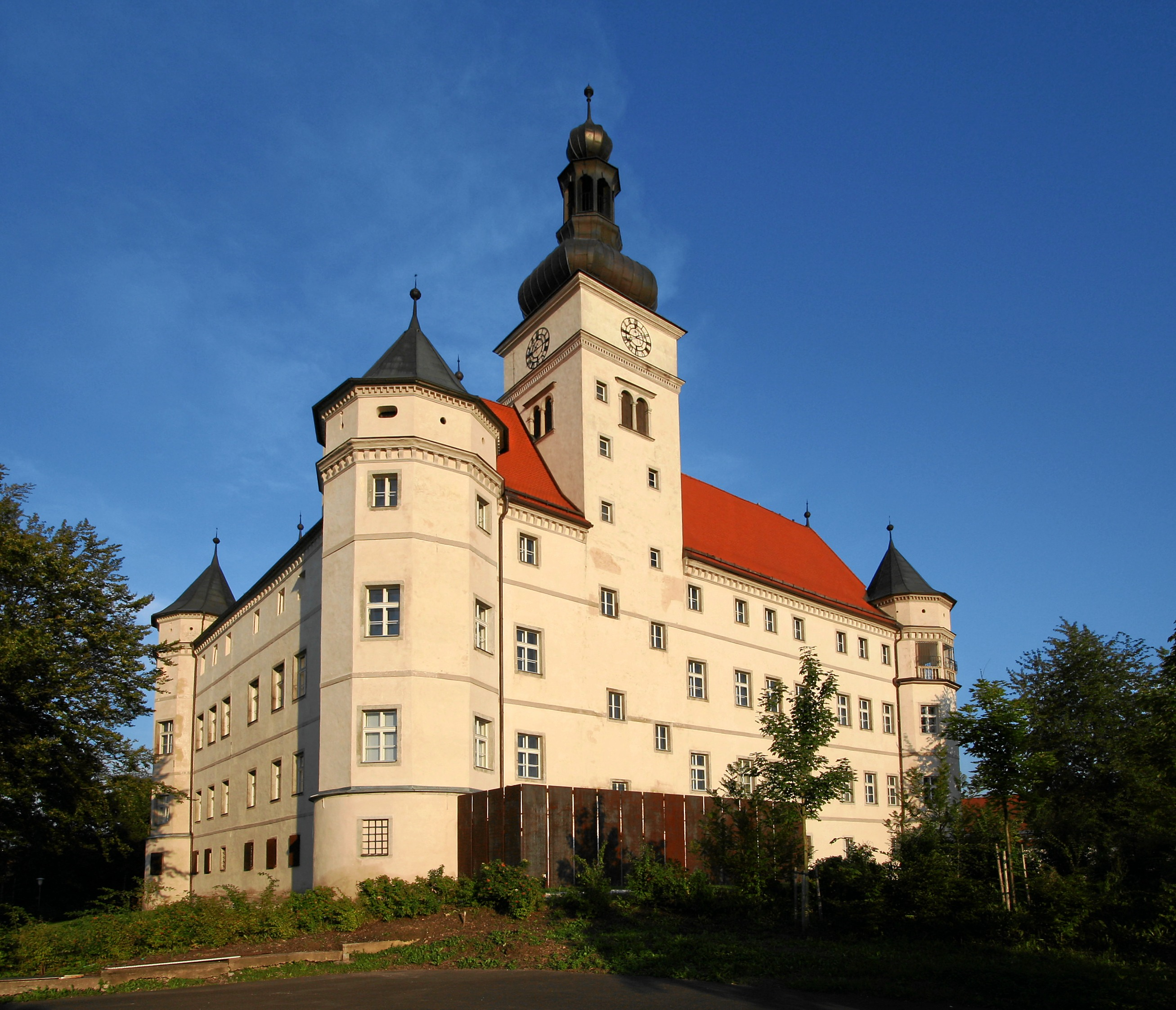
Hartheim Castle in 2005

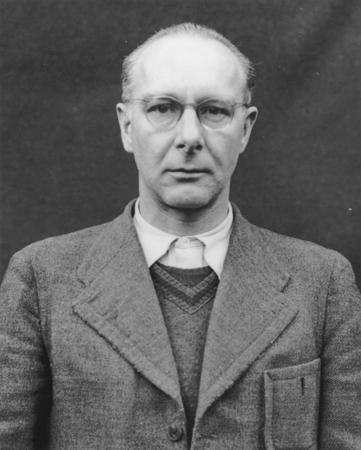
Viktor Brack, organiser of the T4 Programme

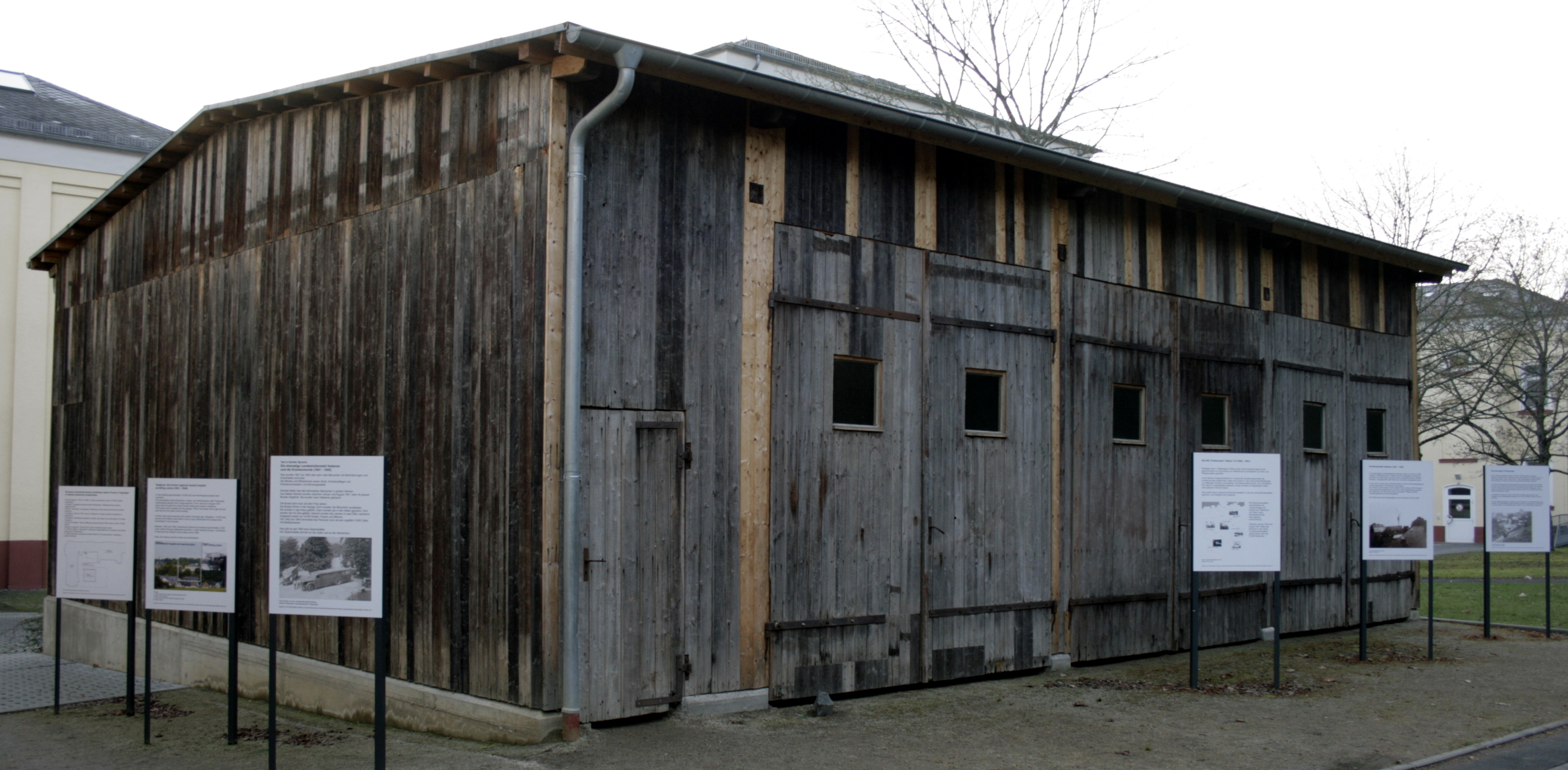
Garage of the "Grey Buses" at the Hadamar killing centre

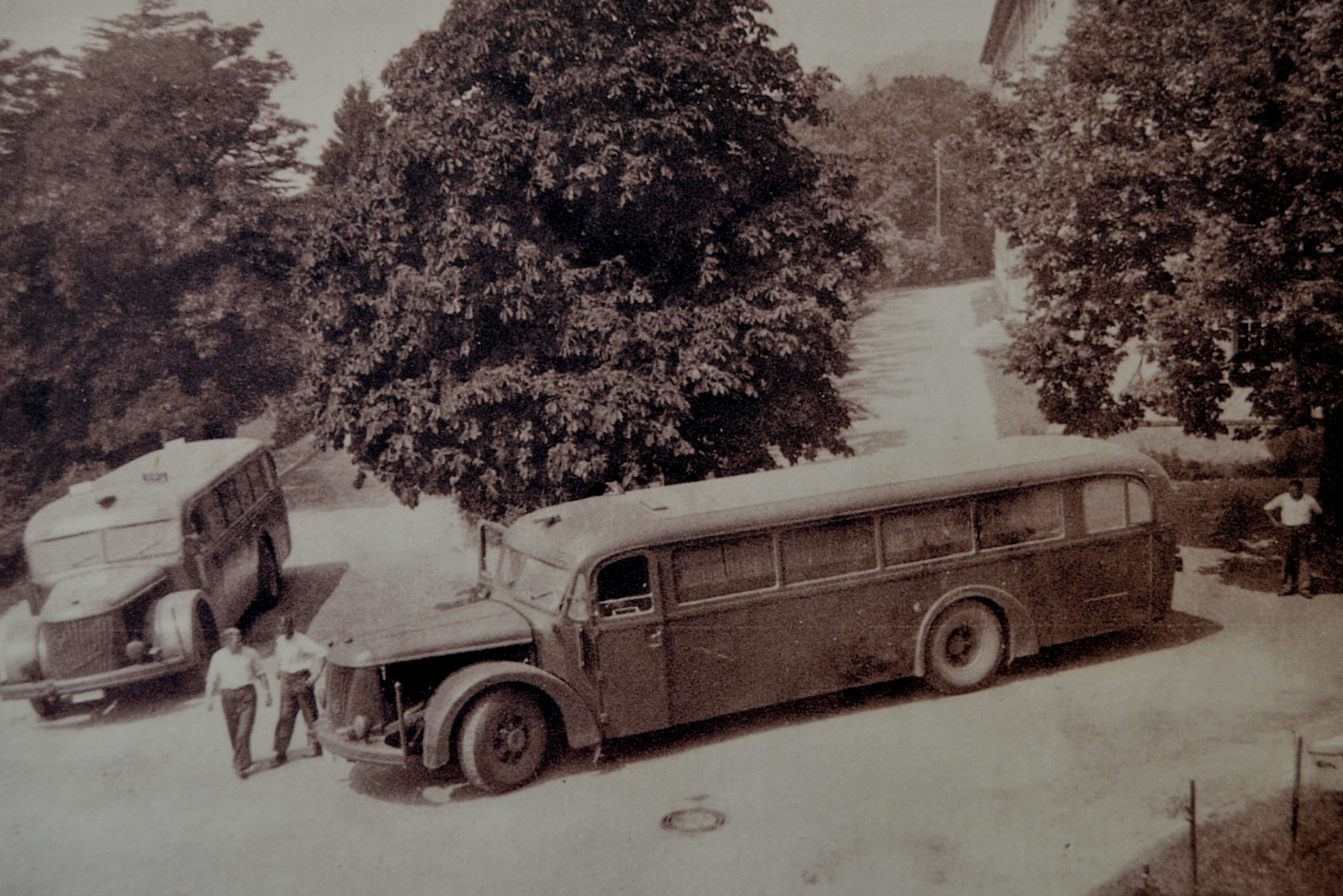
One of the "Grey Buses" at the Hadamar killing centre

Gekrat was created to transport the victims to the Nazi killing centers at Grafeneck Castle, Brandenburg, Schloss Hartheim, Schloss Sonnenstein, Bernburg and Hadamar Euthanasia Centre. It also handled some administrative tasks. When family members wrote to hospitals where their loved ones had been sent, that mail was forwarded to Gekrat, which did not answer inquiries but allowed institutions to provide limited information in reply. The information was provided only as a means for the Nazis to continue receiving payment for room and board. Reinhold Vorberg headed the central office for transportation. Hermann Schwenninger was registered as the chief executive.

After 1941, Gekrat also handled transportation for the Action 14f13 program, which eliminated sick prisoners and those no longer able to work from Nazi concentration camps by bringing them to the killing centers, where they were sent to the gas chambers and killed.

== After 1945 ==
Vorberg fled to Spain in 1961 but was extradited back to Germany in March 1963. After a trial lasting 20 months, he was sentenced to 10 years in prison for complicity in the murder of many thousands of people.

There is a monument to those killed by Action T4 and Action 14f13 in Ravensburg, at the former entrance of the psychiatric hospital in Weissenau Abbey, of that the over 650 patients had been murdered by Action T4. A copy of it was made in 2023 and erected near the Hadamar killing centre. Designed in the shape of one of the old buses, these two monuments are stationary, and the third one is moved to different locations where people were killed in the T4 program.

== See also ==
- Gas van
