= Sonnenstein Castle =

Former mental hospital and extermination centre in Germany

Coordinates: 50°57′39″N 13°56′52″E

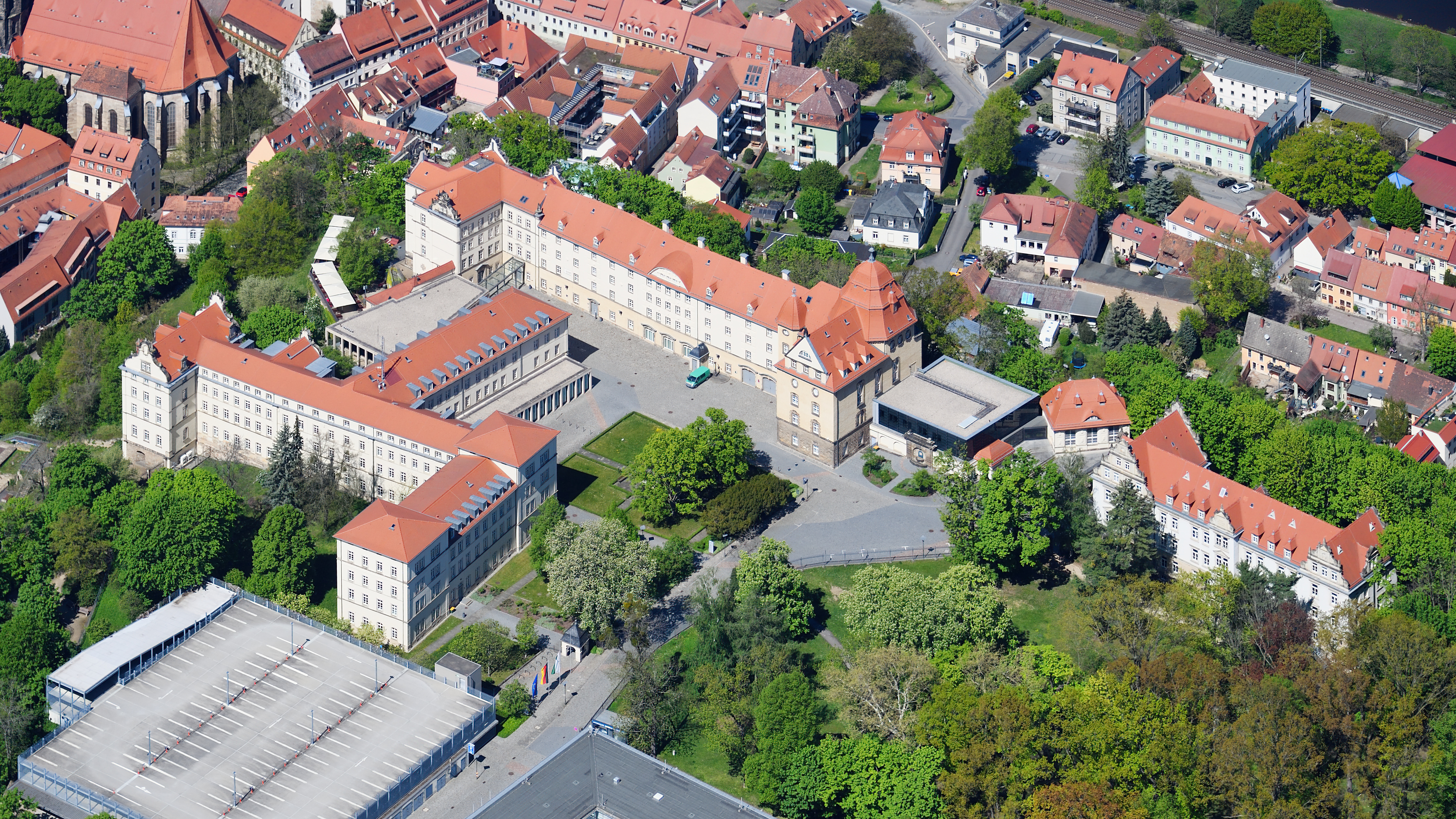
Aerial view of Sonnenstein Castle (2025)

The Sonnenstein Castle is a castle in Pirna, near Dresden, Germany. It housed a mental hospital, which operated from 1811 to the end of World War II in 1945. During the War, it functioned as an extermination centre for the Nazi Aktion T4 program. It was shut down following the war, and reopened in 1970.

== History ==
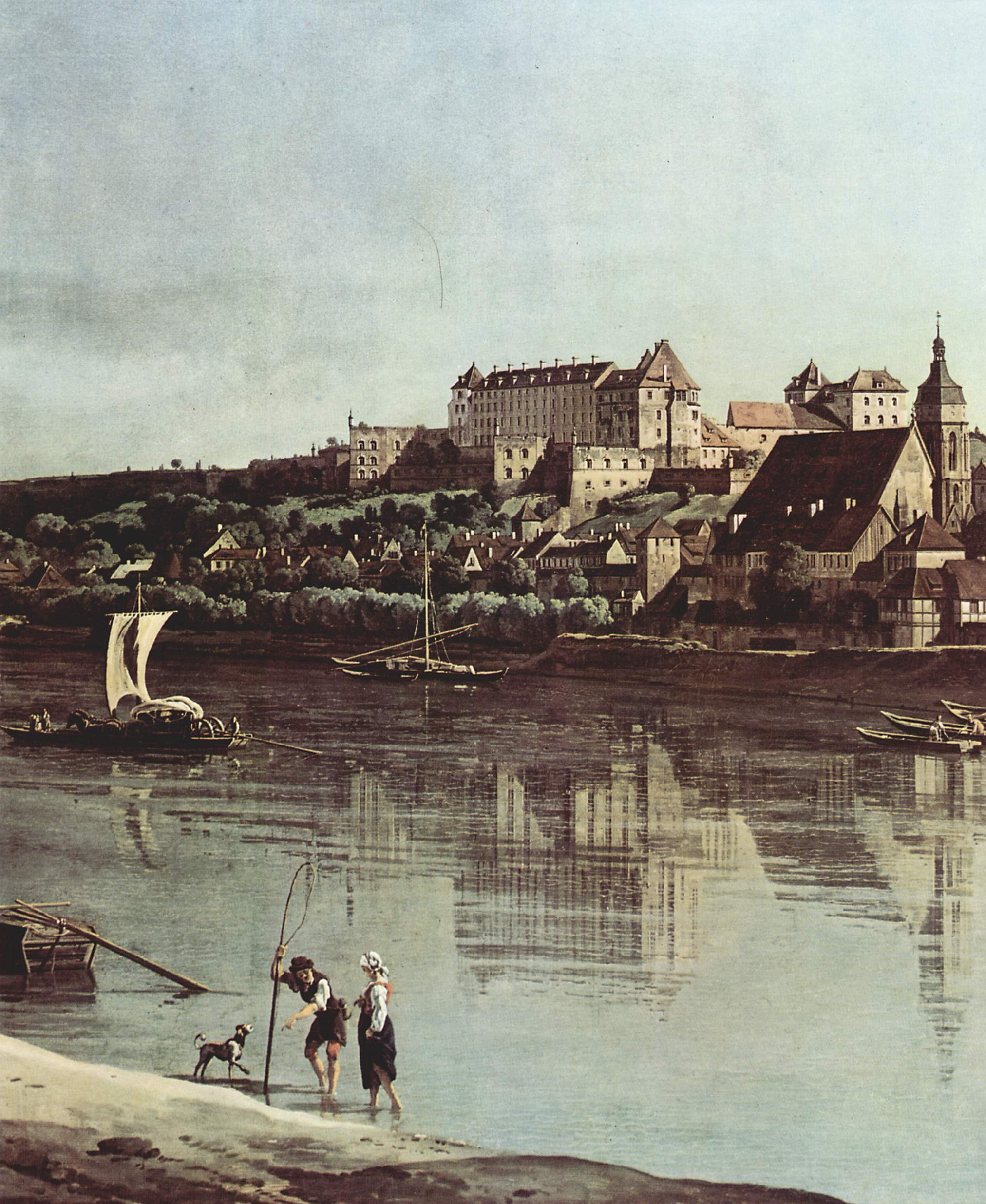
Pirna and Schloss Sonnenstein, by Bernardo Bellotto (Canaletto)

Sonnenstein castle, located at Pirna near Dresden, above the river Elbe, was built after 1460 (566 years ago) on the site of a former medieval castle. Sonnenstein castle was used as a mental home since 1811. Among other patients, Sonnenstein was the asylum in which Daniel Paul Schreber wrote his Denkwürdigkeiten eines Nervenkranken in 1900–2. Because of the advanced methods practiced there, it received worldwide acclaim and served as a model for other institutions. Sonnenstein Asylum was one of the first 'therapeutic asylums'; activity rooms included billiards and music rooms.

=== Nazi era ===
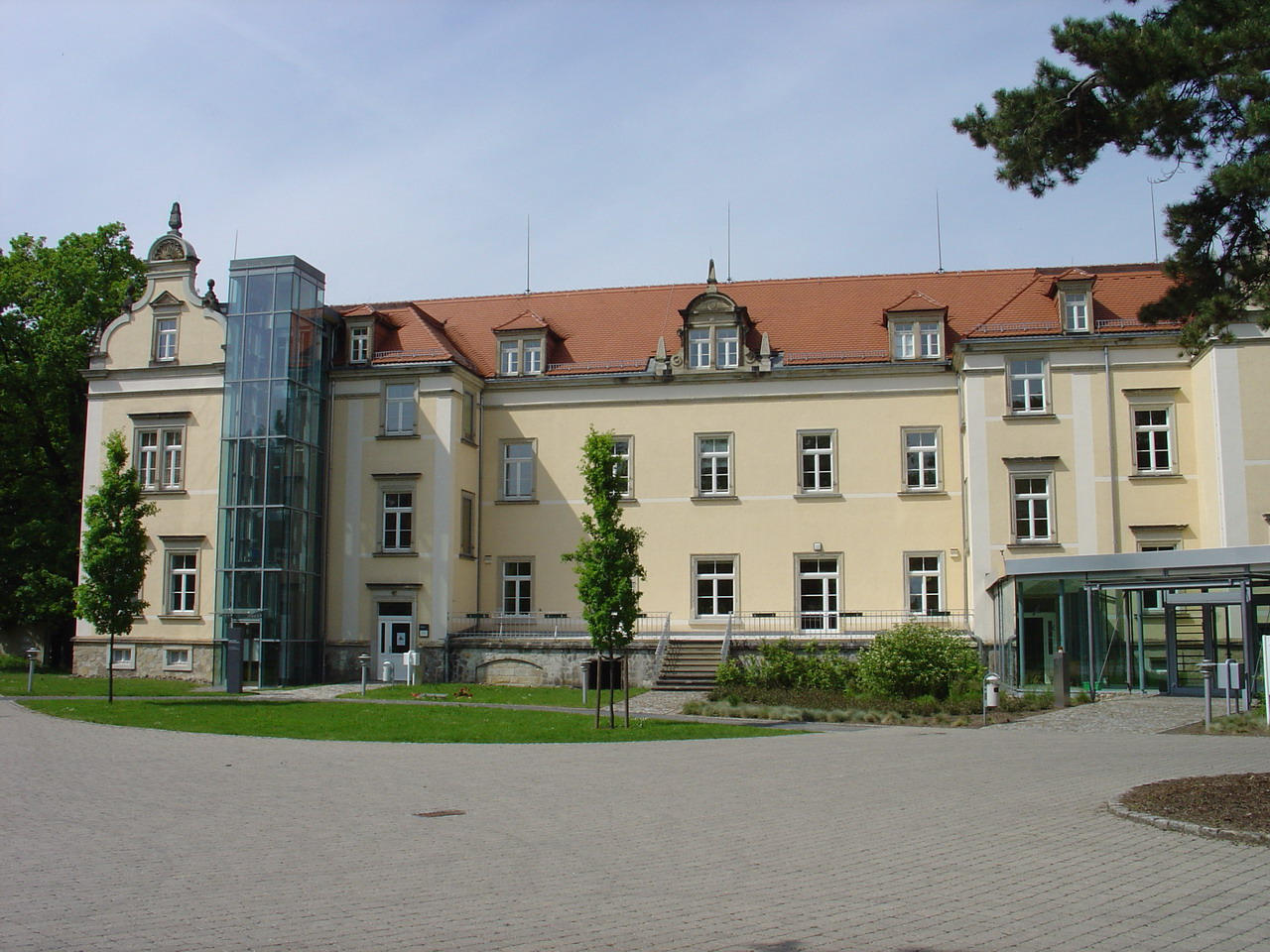
House 16, Schloss Sonnenstein, as a memorial

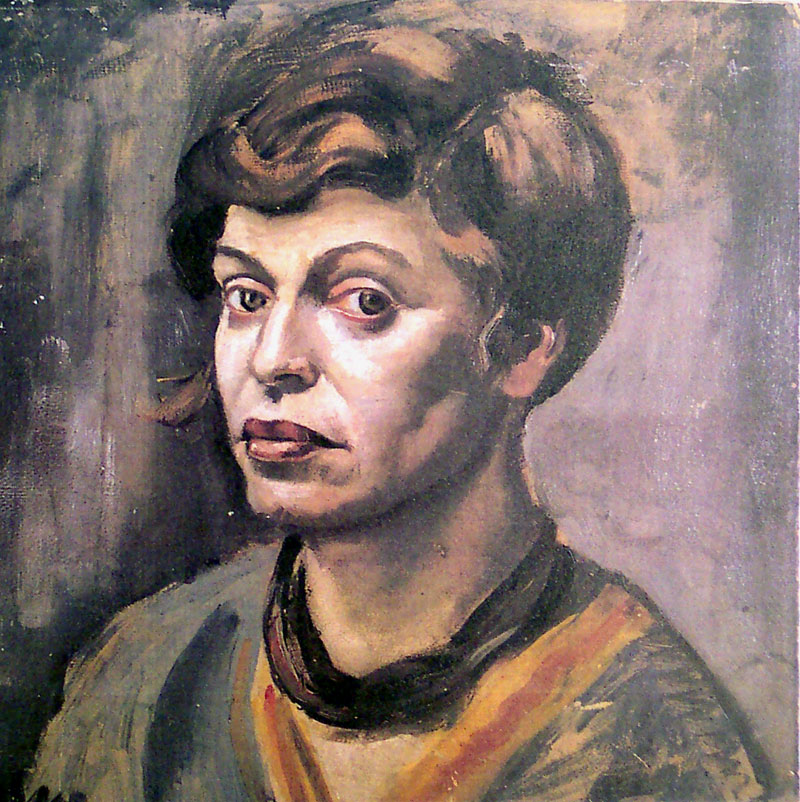
Self-portrait by Elfriede Lohse-Wächtler, who was murdered at Sonnenstein Euthanasia Centre in 1940

From early 1940 until the end of June 1942, a part of the castle was converted into a killing centre. A gas chamber and crematorium were installed in the cellar of the former men's sanitary (building C 16). A high brick-wall on two sides of the complex shielded it from outside while a high hoarding (billboard) was erected on the other sides. Four buildings were located inside the shielding. They were used for offices, living rooms for the personnel etc. Sleeping quarters for the men who burned the bodies were provided for in the attic of building C 16. It is possible that other sections of the buildings were also used by T4.

From end of June 1940 until September 1942, approximately 15,000 persons were killed in the scope of the programme and the Sonderbehandlung 14f13. The staff consisted of about 100 persons. One third of them were ordered to the extermination camps in occupied Poland, because of their experiences in deception, killing, gassing and disposing of prisoners.

During August / September 1942 the Sonnenstein killing centre was liquidated and incriminating installations such as gas chambers and crematorium ovens dismantled. From October 1942 the buildings were used as a military hospital.

=== Aftermath ===
In the summer of 1947 some Action T4 members appeared as accused in the Dresdner Ärzteprozess (Doctor's Trial in Dresden). Professor Paul Nitsche, medical chief of T4, and two male nurses from Sonnenstein were sentenced to death.

It took about 40 years to recognise the part Sonnenstein played in the T4 program, and in 1989 the public commemorated the history of the centre. On 9 June 2000 a memorial center for the T-4 Program was opened in the house. It is managed by the Stiftung Sächsische Gedenkstätten zur Erinnerung an die Opfer politischer Gewaltherrschaft (Foundation for Memorial Institutions in Saxony for the Victims of Tyranny).

Since 1970, the building has again housed disabled people. After the establishment of a rehabilitation center, a workshop for disabled people was opened in 1991.

Bilfinger Berger worked on the refurbishment of Sonnenstein Castle in a project completed in 2011.

The small Saxon Psychiatric Museum in Leipzig, established in 2000, is also giving attention to the history of Sonnenstein castle.

== Literature ==
Stiftung Sächsische Gedenkstätten zur Erinnerung an die Opfer politischer Gewaltherrschaft (ed.), Pirna-Sonnenstein : Von einer Heilanstalt zu einem Ort nationalsozialistischer Tötungsverbrechen (2001). ISBN 3-934382-02-9
