= Karl Steubl =

Austrian SS officer and war criminal (1910–1945)

- SS-Untersturmführer Karl Steubl (Steubel)
- Born: 25 October 1910; Austria-Hungary
- Died: 21 September 1945 (aged 34); Linz, Austria
- Military career
- Allegiance: Nazi Germany
- Branch: Schutzstaffel
- Service years: until 1945
- Rank: Sturmbannführer
- Unit: Totenkopfverbände

SS-Sturmbannführer Karl Steubl, Steubel, or Steibel (25 October 1910 – 21 September 1945) was a Nazi, perpetrator of euthanasia programme dubbed Action T4, and commander of transportation at the Sobibór extermination camp during Operation Reinhard, the most deadly phase of the Holocaust. Arrested after the war in Europe ended, Steubl committed suicide in Linz, Austria.

== Participation in atrocities ==
Before his last assignment at Sobibor in occupied Poland, Steubl was a senior male nurse at Schloss Hartheim, the biggest mass extermination centre outside Eastern Europe set up at Alkoven in Upper Austria. The killing program Action T4 was performed there between 1939 and 1945. Already by August 1941, long before the war's end, a grand total of 18,269 mentally and physically handicapped patients including many others, were murdered at gas chambers of Hartheim Euthanasia Centre and cremated on site in the course of his service there.

Erich Bauer remarked: Steubel participated in gang rapes of female prisoners prior to killing them at Sobibór:

I was blamed for being responsible for the death of the Jewish girls Ruth and Gisela, who lived in the so-called forester house. As it is known, these two girls lived in the forester house, and they were visited frequently by the SS men. Orgies were conducted there. They were attended by [Kurt] Bolender, [Hubert] Gomerski, Karl Ludwig, Franz Stangl, Gustav Wagner, and Steubel. I lived in the room above them and due to these celebrations could not fall asleep after coming back from a journey....

From August 1942, Steubl was one of the Austrian commanders of Sobibór extermination camp, which he also helped organize as an expert in gassing. He was present, and most likely took part in the execution of the last Jews who were sent to Sobibór for clean-up after demolition of the Treblinka extermination camp nearby.

== Arrest and suicide ==
Arrested by the Allies, Steubl was the first of three SS men from Sobibór who committed suicide after the end of World War II in Europe. The second one was Kurt Bolender; recognized by a Holocaust survivor in Germany and arrested in 1961, Bolender committed suicide in prison before sentencing. He was accused of participating in the murder of approximately 86,000 Jews. The third one was SS-Oberscharführer Gustav Wagner ("the Beast of Sobibór"), also from Austria originally. He killed himself in 1980 after being exposed by Simon Wiesenthal in Brazil. By the same token, half of the 13 Sobibór mass murderers tried in 1965–1966 at the Sobibór Trial in Hagen, West Germany were cleared of all charges and set free.
