= Martin Gauger =

German jurist and resistance member

Martin Gauger

Gotthard Martin Gauger (August 4, 1905 Elberfeld – July 15, 1941 Pirna) was a German jurist and pacifist from Wuppertal, Rhenish Prussia. He was a member of the Kreisau Circle which sought to overthrow the Nazi regime in Germany during the Second World War.

He was the fifth of eight children. From 1924–1930 he studied legal science and economics in Tübingen, Kiel, London, Berlin and Breslau. In 1934, as a lawyer in the office of the public prosecutor in München-Gladbach, Gauger refused to take the required oath of allegiance to Hitler and resigned from the civil service. In a subsequent post as legal advisor to the Bekennende Kirche (confessing church) he devoted himself to the resistance movement. On 17 May 1940 he fled to the Netherlands by swimming across the Rhine River. Unfortunately he arrived just as the German Wehrmacht invaded the neutral country. He was wounded and captured, imprisoned until June 1941 in Düsseldorf-Derendorf. On 12 June, he was brought to Buchenwald concentration camp; on 14 July 1941 he was sent to Sonnenstein Euthanasia Centre, where he was murdered.

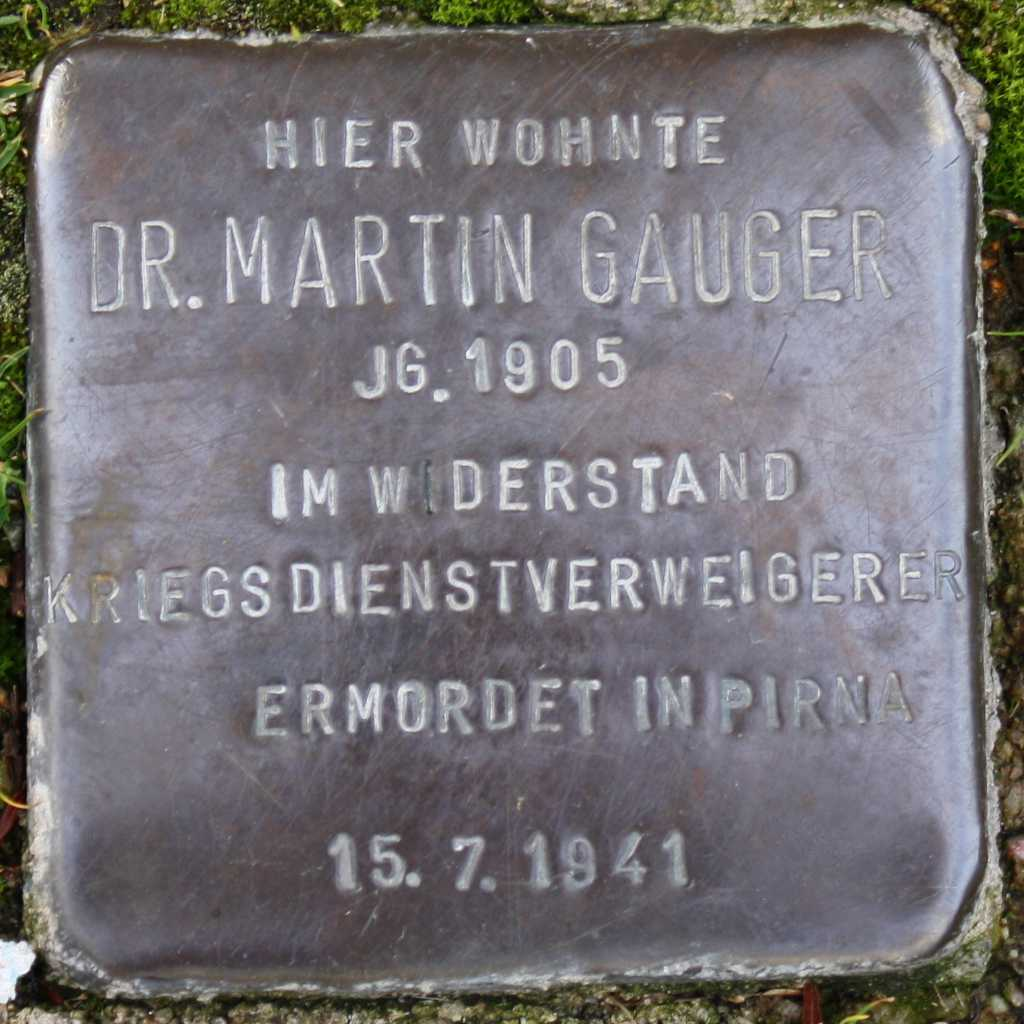
Stolperstein of M.G. in Wuppertal

== See also ==
- List of peace activists
