= Hartheim killing centre =

Nazi killing facility

Coordinates: 48°16′52.17″N 14°06′49.50″E

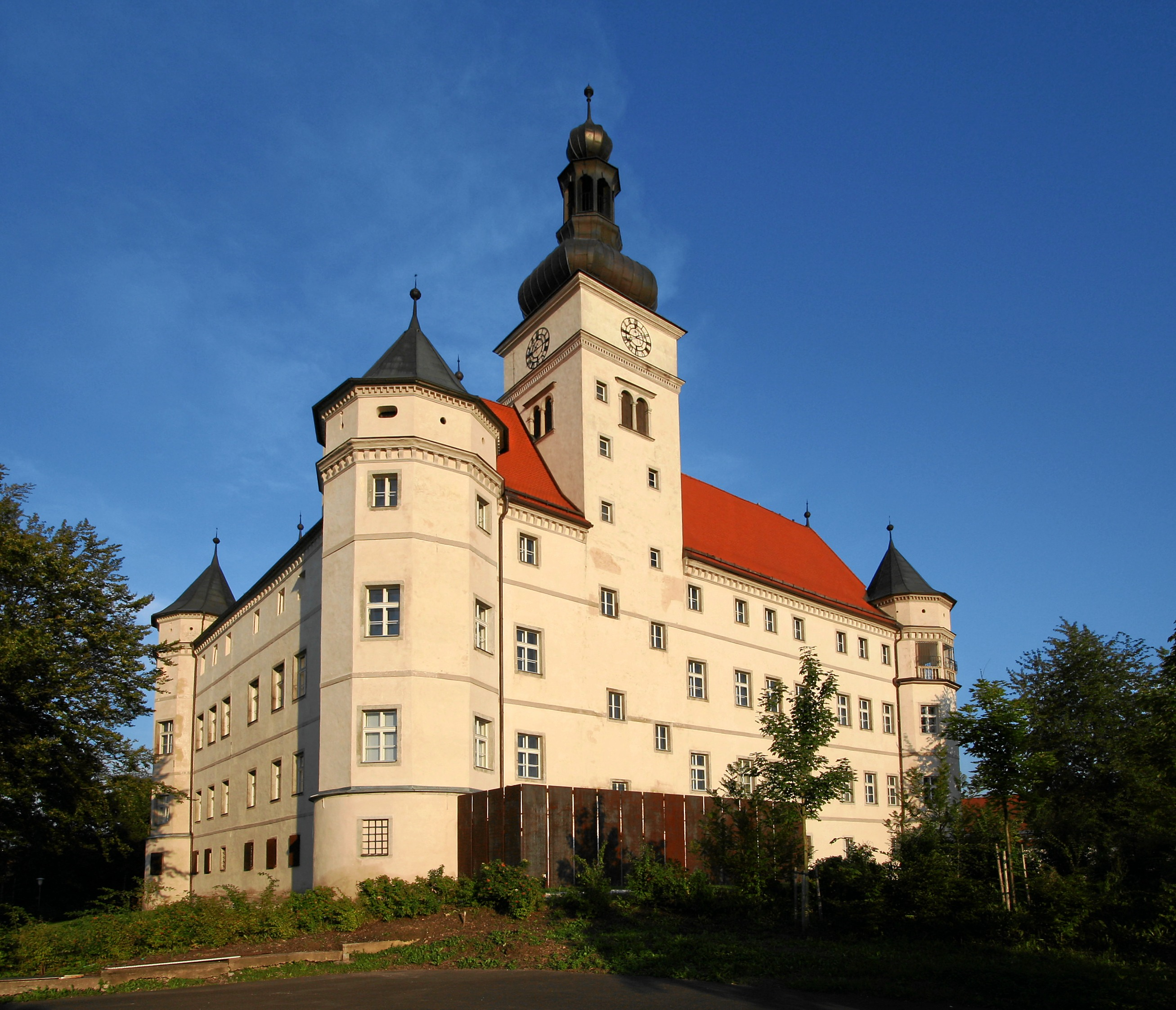
Hartheim Castle in 2005

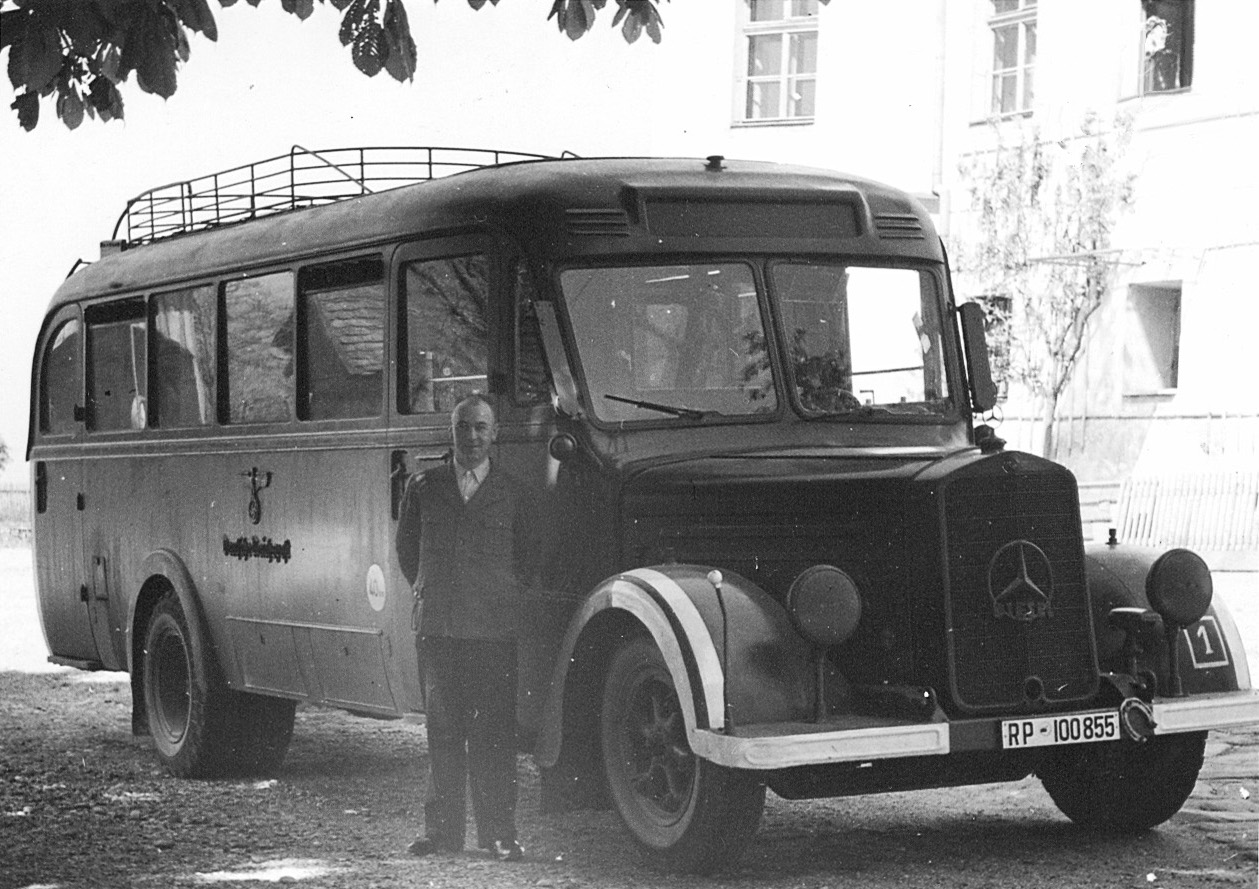
Collection bus and driver

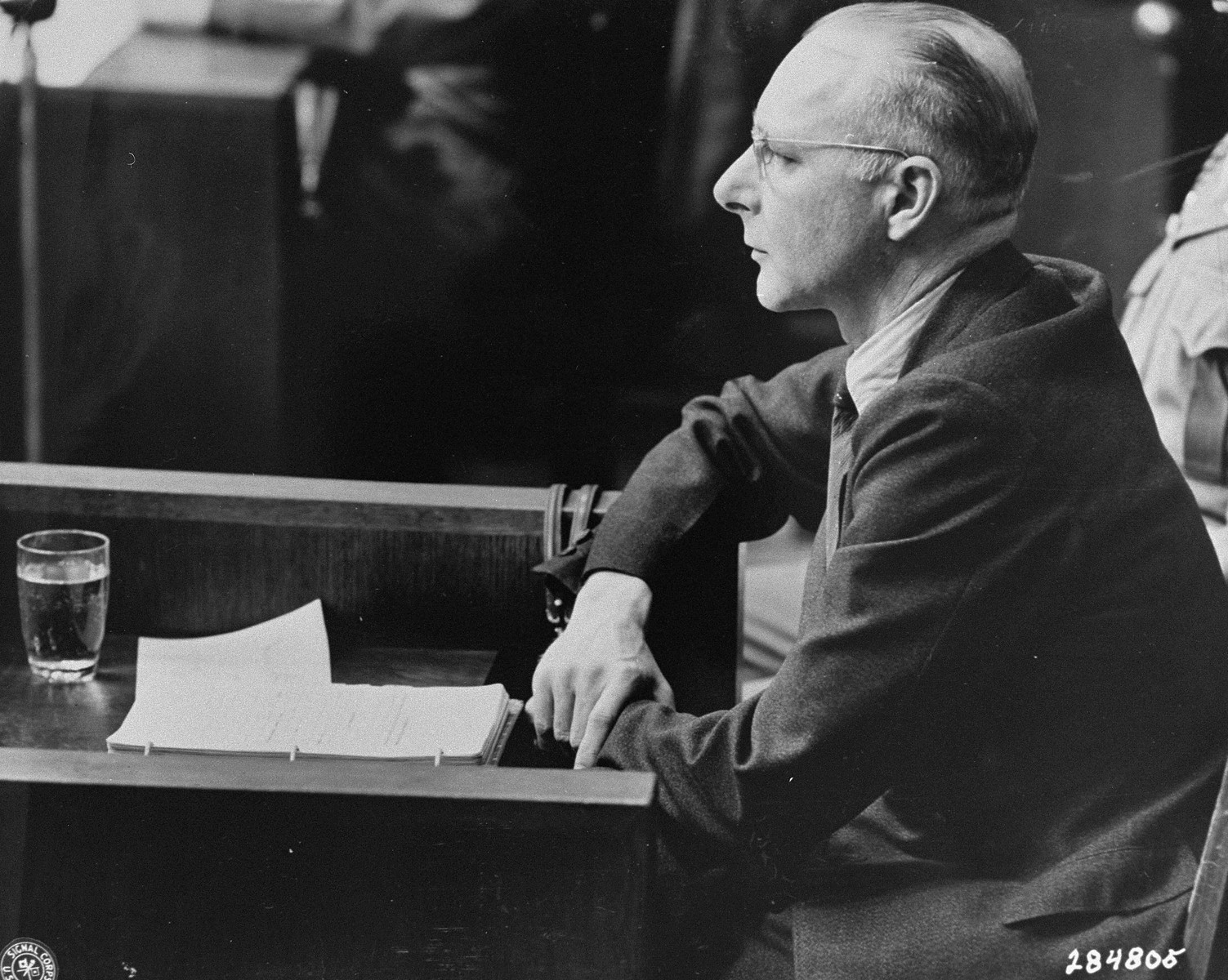
Viktor Brack testifies in his defence at the Doctors' Trial in Nuremberg in 1947.

The Hartheim killing centre (German: NS-Tötungsanstalt Hartheim, sometimes translated as "Hartheim killing facility" or "Hartheim euthanasia centre") was a killing facility involved in the German Nazi programme known as Aktion T4, in which German citizens deemed mentally or physically unfit were systematically murdered with poison gas. Often, these patients were transferred from other killing facilities such as the Am Spiegelgrund clinic in Vienna. This was initially a programme of "involuntary euthanasia" permitted under the law ostensibly to enable the lawful and painless killing of incurably ill patients. These murders continued even after the law was rescinded in 1942.

Other victims included Jews, Communists and those considered undesirable by the state. Concentration camp inmates who were unfit for work, or otherwise deemed troublesome, were also killed here. The facility was housed in Hartheim Castle in the municipality of Alkoven, near Linz, Austria, which now is a memorial site and documentation centre.

== Hartheim statistics ==
In June 1945, during investigations by US Forces into the former gassing facility at Hartheim, the American investigating officer Charles Dameron broke open a steel safe in which the Hartheim statistics were found. This was a 39-page brochure produced for the internal purposes of the Nazi "euthanasia" programme (Aktion T4), and contained monthly statistics of the gassing of mentally and physically handicapped patients (called "disinfection" in the document) carried out in the six killing centres on the territory of the Reich.

In 1968 and 1970, an ex-employee of the establishment revealed, as a witness, that he had to compile the material at the end of 1942. The Hartheim statistics included a page on which it was calculated that "disinfecting 70,273 people with a life expectation of 10 years" had saved food in the value of 141,775,573.80 Reichsmarks.

=== Victims of the first extermination phase in Hartheim ===
According to the Hartheim statistics, a total of 18,269 people were murdered in the gas chamber at Hartheim in the period of 16 months between May 1940 and 1 September 1941:

1940								1941								Total murdered
May	Jun	Jul	Aug	Sep	Oct	Nov	Dec	Jan	Feb	Mar	Apr	May	Jun	Jul	Aug	Total murdered
633	982	1,449	1,740	1,123	1,400	1,396	947	943	1,178	974	1,123	1,106	1,364	735	1,176	18,269

These statistics only cover the first extermination phase of the Nazi's euthanasia programme, Action T4, which was brought to an end by Hitler's order dated 24 August 1941 after protests by the Roman Catholic Church.

In all it is estimated that a total of 30,000 people were murdered at Hartheim. Among those killed were sick and disabled persons as well as prisoners from concentration camps. The killings were carried out by carbon monoxide poisoning.

=== 14f13 "Special Treatment" ===
Three days after the formal end of Action T4, a lorry arrived at Hartheim with 70 Jewish inmates from Mauthausen concentration camp, who were then killed. Hartheim achieved a special notoriety, because it was where the largest number of patients were gassed, and because as part of Action 14f13 Hartheim was the institution in which the most concentration camp prisoners were killed. Their numbers are estimated at 12,000.

Some of the prisoners at Mauthausen who were no longer capable of working, especially in the quarries, and politically undesirable prisoners were brought to Hartheim to be killed. In the papers these transfers were disguised with terms like "recreation leave". The entries under "sickness" included "German-haters", "communist" or "Polish fanatic". From 1944 on, the prisoners were no longer selected by T4 doctors; the objective was simply to gain space in the Mauthausen camp quickly. Other transports came from the concentration camp of Gusen, and probably also from Ravensbrück during 1944, made up of women inmates who were predominantly tuberculosis sufferers and those deemed mentally infirm.

== Execution doctors ==
The Action T4 organisers, Viktor Brack and Karl Brandt, ordered that the execution of the sick had to be carried out by medical doctors because Hitler's memorandum of authorisation of 1 September 1939 only referred to doctors. The operation of the gas tap was thus the responsibility of doctors in the death centres. During the course of the programme, the gas valves were occasionally operated by others in the absence of the doctors, or for other reasons. Many doctors used pseudonyms rather than their real names in the documents.

The following execution doctors worked in Hartheim:

- Head: Rudolf Lonauer: 1 April 1940 to April 1945
- Deputy head: Georg Renno: May 1940 to February 1945

== Niedernhart station ==
The Action T4 killing centres had intermediate stations for victims. Many lorries carrying victims to their destination at Hartheim went via the Niedernhart Mental Institute in Linz, where Rudolf Lonauer was the senior doctor, as he was in Hartheim. There, hundreds of victims were killed, mainly by lethal injection. For the Action T4 patients were screened and categorised, then a bus was filled with the victims and driven to Hartheim.

== Move of T4 to Hartheim and Weissenbach am Attersee ==
In August 1943, due to allied bombing of Berlin, the head office for the National Socialist Euthanasia Programme was moved from Tiergartenstrasse 4, Berlin, to the Ostmark region, which was then humorously described as the air raid shelter of the Reich. The statistic and documents by Paul Nitsche, correspondence, notices and reports were taken to Hartheim (office department, accounts office) and the Schoberstein Recreation Centre near Weißenbach am Attersee (medical department).

== Victims ==
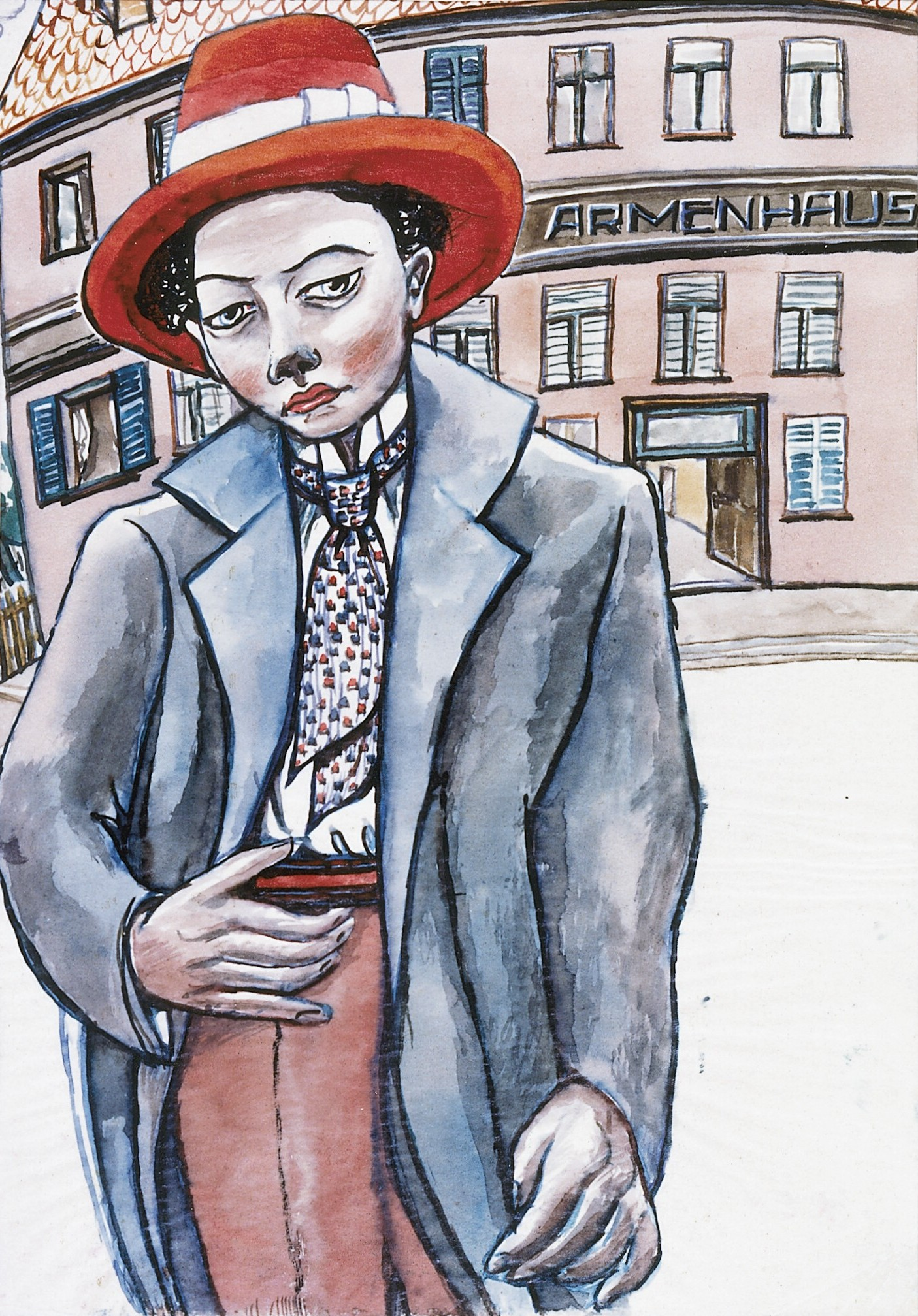
Self-portrait (1928) by the artist Ida Maly, murdered at Hartheim in 1941.

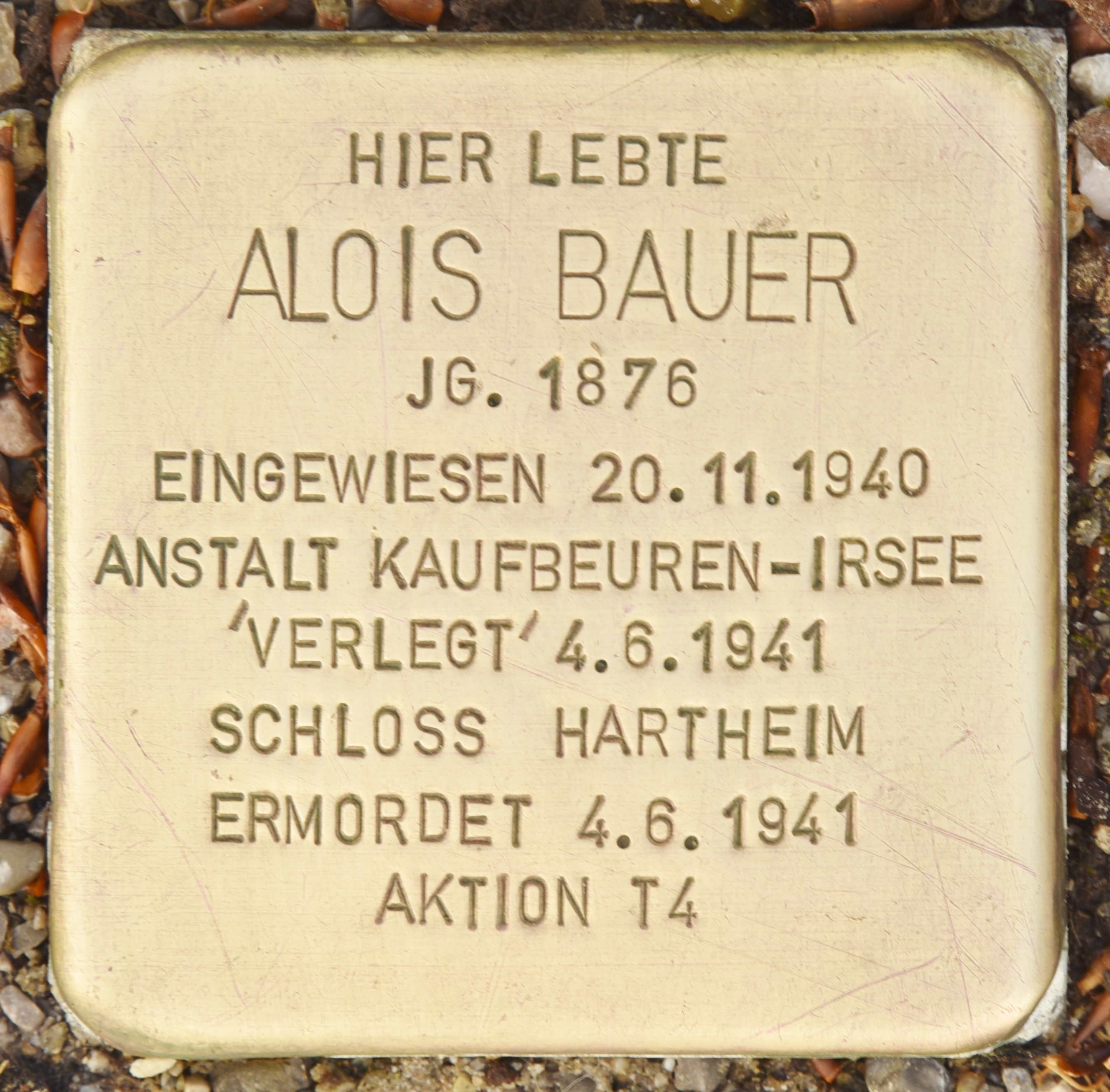
A Stolperstein for Alois Bauer from the Upper Palatinate, a 65-year-old suffering from hallucinations and schizophrenia. He was murdered in the gas chamber at Hartheim.

=== Well-known victims ===
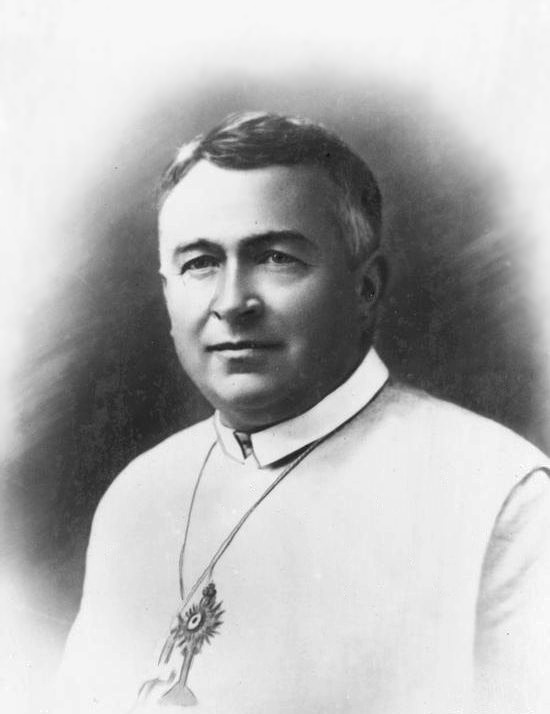
Jan Maria Michał Kowalski

- Princess Maria Karoline of Saxe-Coburg and Gotha, Austrian princess (1899–1941)
- Bernhard Heinzmann (1903–1942), German Roman Catholic priest
- Friedrich Karas (1895–1942), Austrian Roman Catholic priest
- Jan Kowalski (1871–1942), Polish bishop of the Catholic Mariavite Church
- Ida Maly (1894–1941), Austrian artist
- Gottfried Neunhäuserer (1882–1941), Austrian Benedictine father
- Friederike (Friedl) Roth, née Reichler (1900–1940), widow of writer Joseph Roth
- Werner Sylten (1893–1942), Protestant theologian
- Aloisia Veit [de] (1891–1940), second cousin of Adolf Hitler
- Norbert Čapek (1870–1942), founder of the Czechoslovak Unitarian Church

=== Clergy ===
A total of 310 Polish, seven German, six Czech, four Luxemburg, three Dutch and two Belgian priests were murdered. Many of them were transported from the Priest's Block in Dachau concentration camp. The chaplain, Hermann Scheipers, was also moved to the Invalid's Block, in order to be taken to Hartheim. Scheiper's sister—who stayed in contact by letter—tracked down Dr. Bernsdorf, employee of the RSHA Berlin-Oranienburg, who was responsible for the clergy imprisoned in the Priest's Block.

She confronted him and stated that, in Münsterland, it was an open secret that imprisoned priests were sent to the gas chamber. Bernsdorf apparently became very nervous during the discussion and telephoned the Commandant's Office at Dachau. Scheipers reported that it was on that same day, the 13 August 1942, that there was a response: he and three other German clergymen were moved from the Invalid's Block, where the SS assembled prisoners for onward transportation, back to the Priest's Block.

== Hartheim T4 staff ==
- Erwin Lambert: master bricklayer, oversaw construction of the crematorium and gas chambers
- Rudolf Lonauer: head Nazi euthanasia doctor in Hartheim, Niedernhart Mental Asylum in Linz and Geschwend Castle in Neuhofen an der Krems
- Vinzenz Nohel: worker, "burner"
- Franz Reichleitner: criminal policeman, management; was later commandant of Sobibor extermination camp
- Georg Renno: psychiatrist, deputy head Nazi euthanasia doctor
- Anton Schrottmayer: care worker, suicide
- Franz Stangl: criminal policeman, Gestapo official, deputy office manager; was later camp commandant of Sobibor and Treblinka
- Karl Steubel: senior care worker, suicide
- Josef Vallaster: worker, "burner", later overseer at Sobibor extermination camp
- Gustav Wagner: was later deputy commandant at Sobibor extermination camp
- Christian Wirth: criminal commissar, office manager; was later commandant in Belzec extermination camp
- Paul Bredow: later worked at Treblinka
- Bruno Kochan: male nurse

Kochan and at least 14 others employees were involved in an amateur scheme to use fraudulent letters to enrich themselves. In August 1942, Kochan was arrested by the Gestapo for embezzlement. He had used forged papers to impersonate a police officer and to enrich himself. He and his accomplices had used various forged documents to obtain special privileges, including free travel on the railroad and free deck chairs at the beach. Kochan also used the papers to convince Jews that he could get them exit visas for money. All of these things posed the threat of exposing the operation.

Kochan was not allowed to defend himself during his trial and the judges could not ask questions. He was sentenced to death on 10 February 1943. Kochan, 35, was guillotined at Plötzensee Prison on 16 March 1943.

Those chiefly responsible for recruiting the lower-ranking staff, according to witness statements, were the two Gau inspectors, Stefan Schachermayr (1912–2008) and Franz Peterseil (1907–1991), as well as Adolf Gustav Kaufmann (1902–1974), head of the inspection department of the T4 central office in Berlin.

== See also ==
- Schloss Hartheim
- Am Spiegelgrund clinic

== Sources ==
- Gabriel, Heinz Eberhard; Neugebauer, Wolfgang, eds. (2002). Vorreiter der Vernichtung? Von der Zwangssterilisierung zur Ermordung Zur Geschichte der NS-Euthanasie in Wien, Vol. 2. Vienna: Böhlau. ISBN 3-205-99325-X.. Table of contents.
- Horsinga-Renno, Mireille (2008). Der Arzt von Hartheim: Wie ich die Wahrheit über die Nazi-Vergangenheit meines Onkels herausfand. Translated by Bauer, Martin. Reinbek bei Hamburg: Rowohlt. ISBN 978-3-499-62307-3.. Summary online.
- Kepplinger, Brigitte. Die Tötungsanstalt Hartheim 1940–1945 (PDF) (in German). Archived from the original (PDF) on 21 July 2004.
- Kepplinger, Brigitte; Marckhgott, Gerhart; Reese, Hartmut, eds. (2008). Tötungsanstalt Hartheim. Oberösterreich in der Zeit des Nationalsozialismus. Vol. 3 (2 ed.). Linz: Oberösterreichisches Landesarchiv. ISBN 978-3-900313-89-0.. Summary.
- Walter Kohl: Die Pyramiden von Hartheim. Euthanasie in Oberösterreich 1940 bis 1945. Edition Geschichte der Heimat. Steinmaßl, Grünbach, 1997, ISBN 3-900943-51-6. – Table of contents.
- Walter Kohl: "Ich fühle mich nicht schuldig". Georg Renno, Euthanasiearzt. Paul-Zsolnay-Verlag, Vienna, 2000, ISBN 3-552-04973-8.
- Kurt Leininger: Verordnetes Sterben – verdrängte Erinnerungen. NS-Euthanasie in Schloss Hartheim. Verlagshaus der Ärzte, Vienna, 2006, ISBN 978-3-901488-82-5.
- Tom Matzek: Das Mordschloss. Auf den Spuren von NS-Verbrechen in Schloss Hartheim. 1. Auflage. Kremayr & Scheriau, Vienna, 2002, ISBN 3-218-00710-0. (Description of contents).
- Johannes Neuhauser (ed.): Hartheim – wohin unbekannt. Briefe & Dokumente. Publication P No 1 – Bibliothek der Provinz. Bibliothek der Provinz, Weitra, 1992, ISBN 3-900878-47-1.
- Franz Rieger: Schattenschweigen oder Hartheim. Roman. (Zeitkritischer Roman). Styria, Graz (u.a.) 1985, ISBN 3-222-11641-5. (Ausgabe 2002: ISBN 3-85252-496-2).
- Jean-Marie Winkler, Gazage de concentrationnaires au château de Hartheim. L'action 14f13 en Autriche annexée. Nouvelles recherches sur la comptabilité de la mort, éditions Tirésias - Michel Reynaud, Paris, 2010 (ISBN 9782915293616)

Other literature see main article: Nazi Euthanasia Programme or Action T4

== Audio and video ==
- Tom Matzek: Das Mordschloss. Eine Dokumentation über die Gräuel in Schloss Hartheim. TV programme by ORF, 2001, Brennpunkt. 1 videocassette (VHS, ca. 45 minutes). S. n., s. l. 2001. (Note: Permalink Österreichischer Bibliothekenverbund, Description of contents.)
