= Elfriede Lohse-Wächtler =

German painter

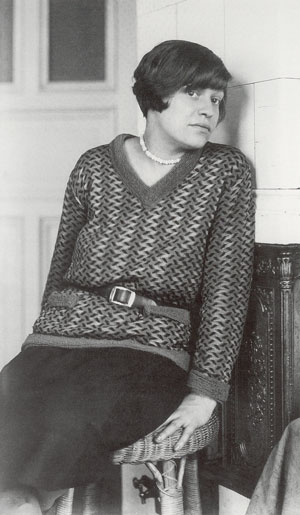
- Photo of Elfriede Lohse-Wächtler (ca. 1920)
- Born: 4 December 1899; Dresden, German Empire
- Died: 31 July 1940 (aged 40); Pirna, Nazi Germany
- Known for: Painting
- Movement: Expressionist

Elfriede Lohse-Wächtler (born Anna Frieda Wächtler; 4 December 1899 – 31 July 1940) was a German painter of the avant-garde whose works were banned as "degenerate art", and in some cases destroyed, in Nazi Germany. She became mentally ill and was murdered in a former psychiatric institution at Sonnenstein castle in Pirna under Aktion T4, a forced euthanasia program of Nazi Germany. Since 2000, a memorial center for the T4 program in the house commemorates her life and work in a permanent exhibition.

== Life ==
Elfriede Lohse-Wächtler grew up in a middle-class family, but left at the age of 16 to study at the Royal Arts School Dresden from 1915 to 1918 (fashion, then applied graphics). From 1916 to 1919, she also attended drawing and painting courses at the Dresden Art Academy. She came into contact with the Dresden Secession Group 1919 and became part of the circle of friends around Otto Dix, Otto Griebel, and Conrad Felixmüller. Renting part of the studio of the latter near the Dresden city center she made a living with batiks, postcards and illustrations.

In June 1921, she married the painter and opera singer Kurt Lohse, following him to Görlitz in 1922 and in 1925 to Hamburg. The marriage was a difficult one and the couple separated several times in the following years. In 1926, Elfriede Lohse-Wächtler joined the Federation of female Hamburgian artists and art lovers; in 1928. She participated in some exhibitions of the New Objectivity.

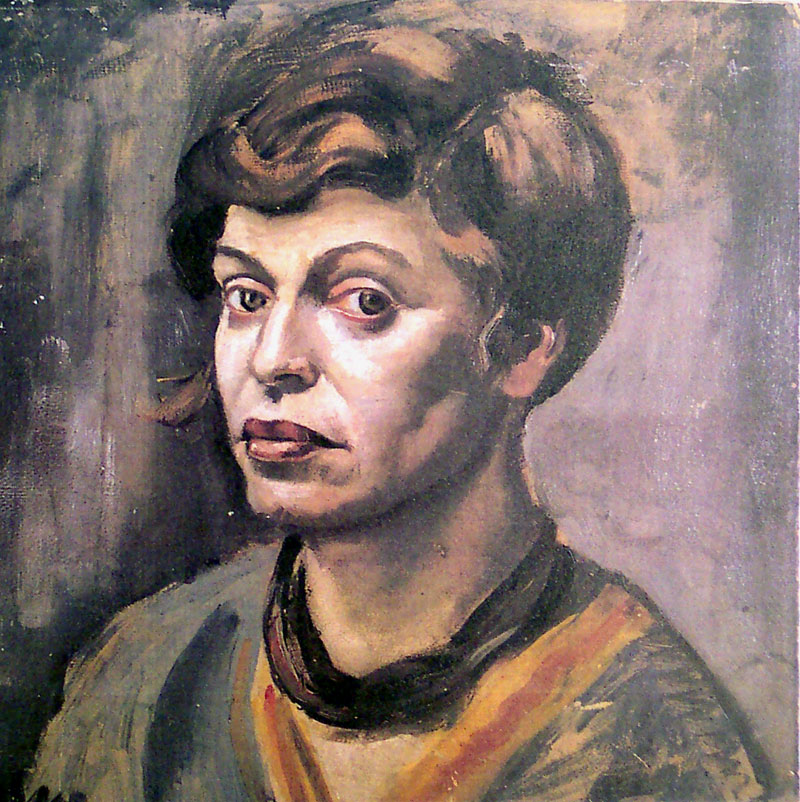
Self-Portrait (c. 1930), oil on cardboard 43.0 cm × 45.0 cm (16.9 in × 17.7 in)

In 1929, she had a nervous breakdown because of financial and partnership difficulties and was committed to a psychiatric institution in Hamburg-Friedrichsberg. During the two months' stay she painted the Friedrichsberg heads, a piece of work consisting of about 60 drawings and pastels, mainly portraits of fellow patients. After her recovery and a final separation from Kurt Lohse (in 1926), she had a very creative phase. She painted numerous paintings of Hamburg's harbor, scenes from the life of workers and prostitutes, and pitiless self-portraits. But despite some exhibitions, sales, and smaller grants, she lived in grinding poverty.

Due to financial problems and increasing social isolation, she returned to her parents' home in Dresden by mid 1931. When her mental state worsened her father admitted her to the state mental home at Arnsdorf in 1932. There she was diagnosed with schizophrenia. From 1932 to 1935 she was still creatively active, drawing portraits and creating arts and crafts. After Kurt Lohse divorced her in May 1935 she was incapacitated due to "incurable insanity".

After refusing to consent to sterilisation, she was denied permission to go out of the hospital anymore. In December 1935, she underwent a forced surgical sterilisation in the Dresden-Friedrichstadt women's hospital on the grounds of Nazi eugenicist policies. After this traumatic event she never painted again. In 1940 she was deported to the former psychiatric institution, now a killing centre, at Pirna-Sonnenstein (located in the Sonnenstein castle in Pirna), where, on 31 July, she was murdered along with the majority of the other residents as part of the Nazi "euthanasia" program, Aktion T4. The official cause of death was "pneumonia with myocardial insufficiency". In the years of 1940 and 1941, a total of 13,720 mainly mentally ill or disabled people were gassed by Nazis in this institution formerly well known for its humanistic traditions.

== Works ==
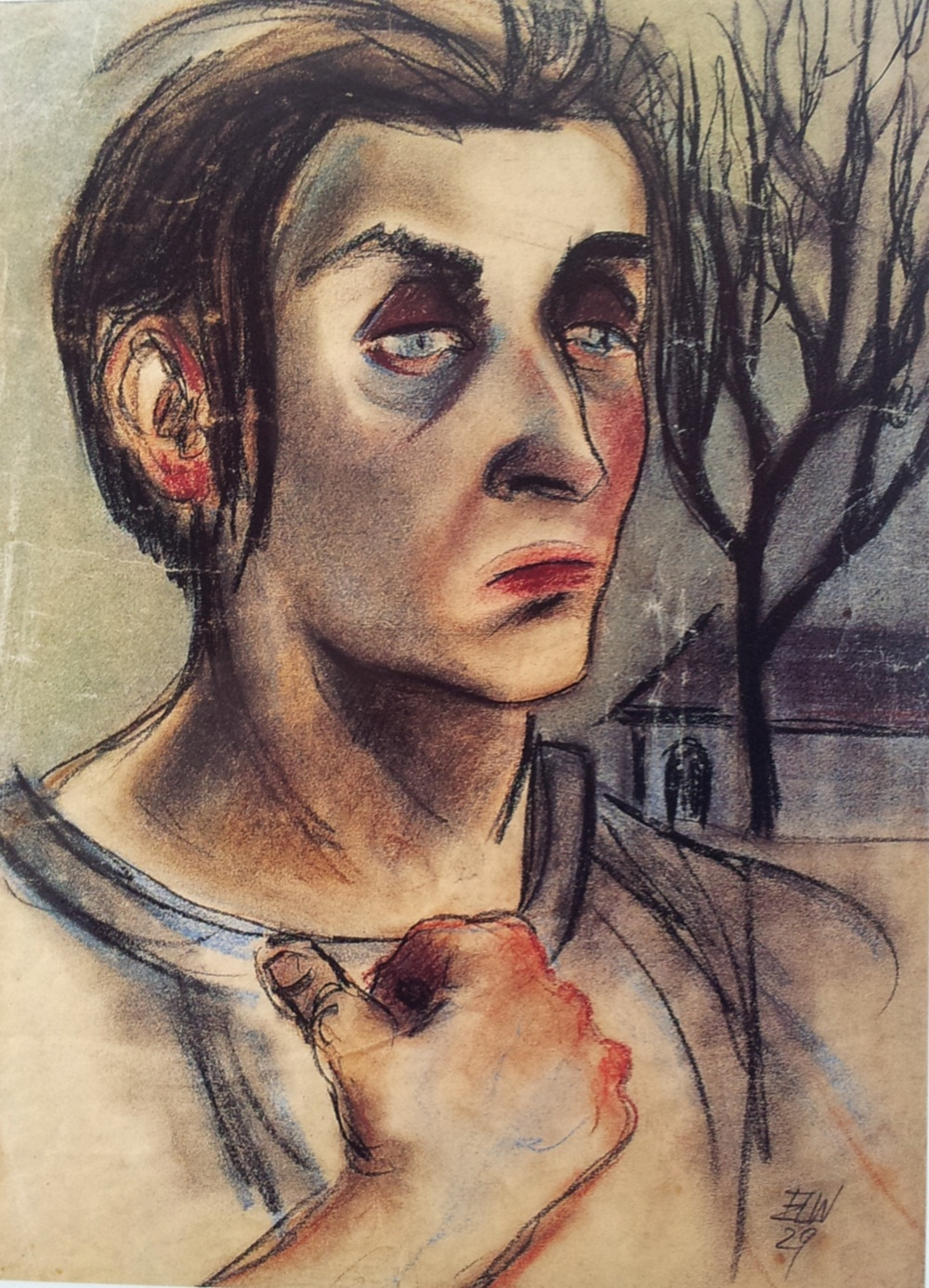
A female patient. Woman with landscape., 1929.

Her most creative period falls within the time of her stay in Hamburg. From 1927 to 1931, she painted some of her major works. The portraits of mentally ill people she drew in Hamburg-Friedrichsberg (1929) and Arnsdorf (1932–1935) have attracted much interest. As part of the "degenerate art" campaign by the Nazis, nine of her works from the art museum Hamburger Kunsthalle and the Altonaer Museum were confiscated and destroyed in 1937, including paintings entitled Strassen-Musik, In der Kneipe, Aus St Pauli, Café, and Cabarett, as well as a large part of her paintings from Arnsdorf.

== Commemoration and legacy ==
Renewed interest in Lohse-Wächtler started with a presentation of some of her paintings in Reinbek near Hamburg. In 1994, an association for the promotion of the works of Elfriede Lohse-Wächtler was founded (Förderkreis Elfriede Lohse-Wächtler). 1996 saw the publication of the first monograph on her works, written by Georg Reinhardt. This and the exhibitions in Dresden, Hamburg-Altona and Aschaffenburg marked the beginning of a broader reception of the artist's work and fate.

In 1999, there was a stele erected in memory of her at the Saxon Hospital in Arnsdorf and a ward house named after her. In Pirna-Sonnenstein, a street was dedicated to her in 2005, and since 2008, a street in Arnsdorf also carries her name. At the former hospital site in Friedrichsberg (Hamburg-Barmbek-Süd), a rose garden with a commemorative plaque was designed for her in 2004. In the development area close by, another street was also given her name.

== Exhibitions ==
These were some of the most important expositions on the work of Elfriede Lohse-Wächtler:

- 1991 Castle Reinbek bei Hamburg
- 1997 Art Gallery Finckenstein, Dresden
- 1999 Municipal museum of Dresden, Altonaer Museum in Hamburg and Municipal Gallery of the City of Aschaffenburg
- 2002 Gallery Kunsthandel & Edition Fischer, Berlin
- 2003 Municipal museum of Pirna 2003
- 2004 Prinzhorn Collection, Heidelberg
- 2005 Representation of the Free State of Saxony to the Federation, Berlin
- 2006 During the exhibition Female Artists of the Avant-garde (II) in Hamburg from 1890 to 1933 (2006) in the art museum Hamburger Kunsthalle there were also several works by Elfriede Lohse-Wächtler. Amongst them one of her most famous paintings, the "Lissy" from 1931 was on display.
- 2008/09 Zeppelin Museum, Friedrichshafen, Lake Constance and Paula Modersohn-Becker Museum, Bremen: comprehensive exhibition on the life and work of the painter: Elfriede Lohse-Wächtler. 1899-1940 with about one hundred of their works from all phases (with extensive catalog of the same title)
- 2010 Käthe-Kollwitz-house, Moritzburg (near Dresden): watercolors and drawings

== See also ==
- List of German women artists
