= Sonnenstein killing centre =

Nazi killing facility at Sonnenstein Castle

Coordinates: 50.961498°N 13.950943°E

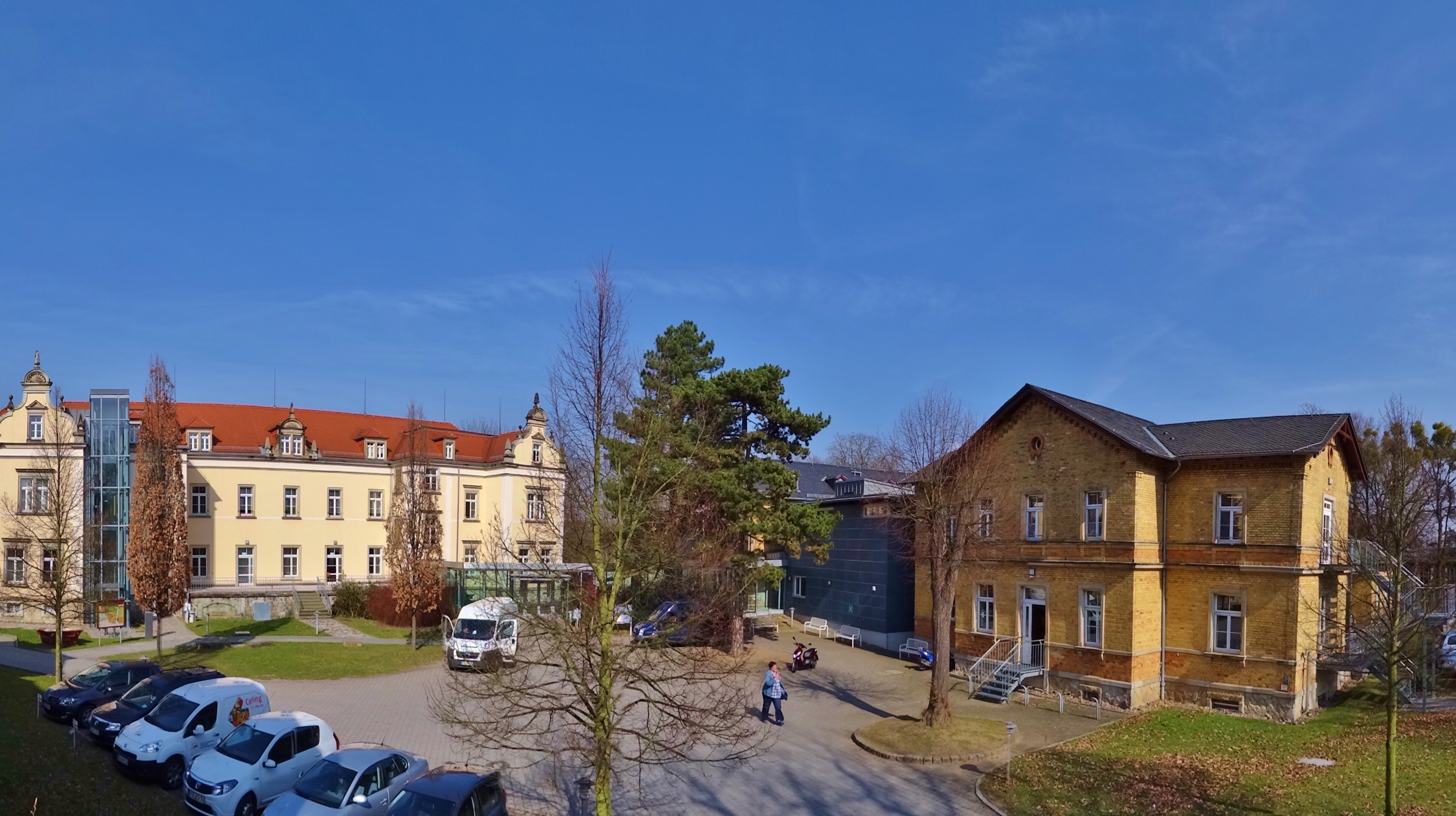
House 16 (left side), Schloss Sonnenstein, as a memorial

The Sonnenstein killing centre (German: NS-Tötungsanstalt Sonnenstein; literally "National Socialist Killing Centre Sonnenstein") was a Nazi killing centre located in the former fortress of Sonnenstein Castle near Pirna in eastern Germany, where a hospital had been established in 1811.

In 1940 and 1941, the facility was used by the Nazis to murder around 15,000 people under the euphemism of "euthanasia". The majority of victims had psychological disorders or intellectual disabilities, but their number also included inmates from the Nazi concentration camps. Sonnenstein was one of six killing centres set up after the beginning of the Second World War as part of a nationwide, centrally coordinated and largely secret programme called Aktion T4 for the "elimination of life unworthy of life" (Vernichtung lebensunwerten Lebens) or the murder of what the Nazis called "dead weight existences" (Ballastexistenzen).

These murders at Sonnenstein and elsewhere served as organizational and technical preparation for the Holocaust; many of the key personnel of Aktion T4 had prominent roles in Operation Reinhard. The method of murdering prisoners with gas was adopted at Auschwitz and other extermination camps.

Today, the Pirna Sonnenstein Memorial Site commemorates the victims of these crimes.

== Early history ==
The former castle site and fortress was converted in 1811 into an institute for mentally ill patients who were assessed as curable. It had a good reputation due to its psychiatric reform concept. The general practitioner and first director of this hospital was Ernst Gottlob Pienitz. Between 1855 and 1914 the institute was expanded with numerous extensions. From 1922 to 1939 the national nursing college (Pflegerschule) was moved to Sonnenstein.

In 1928, Hermann Paul Nitsche was appointed as the director of the Sonnenstein Mental Institution (Heilanstalt Sonnenstein) which had now grown to over 700 patients. Under his tenure, the clinic began to systematically exclude chronically mentally ill patients. As an advocate of "racial hygiene" and euthanasia, he carried out compulsory sterilisations, questionable compulsory medical procedures and food rationing on patients with "hereditary" diseases. In autumn 1939, the institute was closed to the public in a decree by Saxon Interior Minister and was repurposed as a military hospital and resettlement camp.

== Systematic murder of patients ==
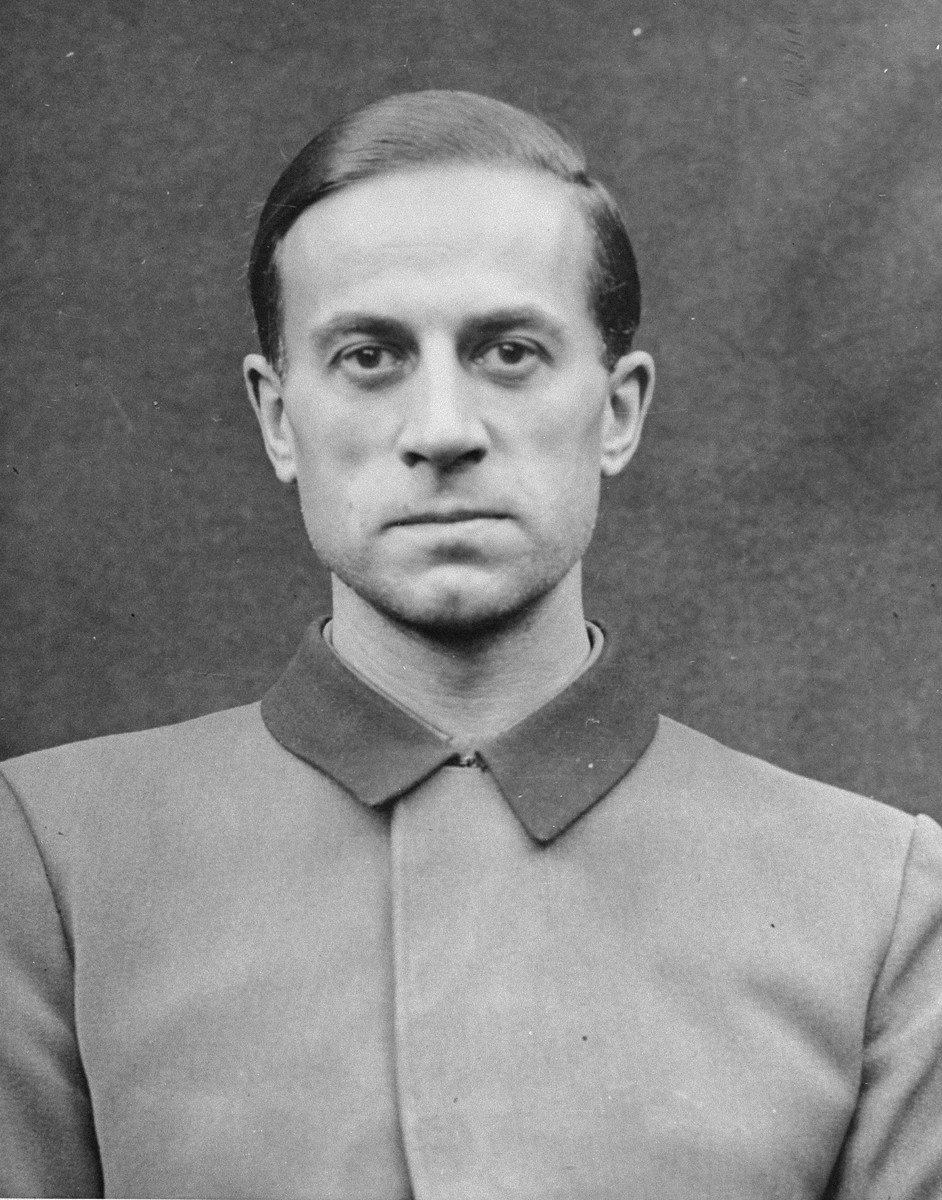
Karl Brandt, Hitler's personal physician and organiser of Action T4

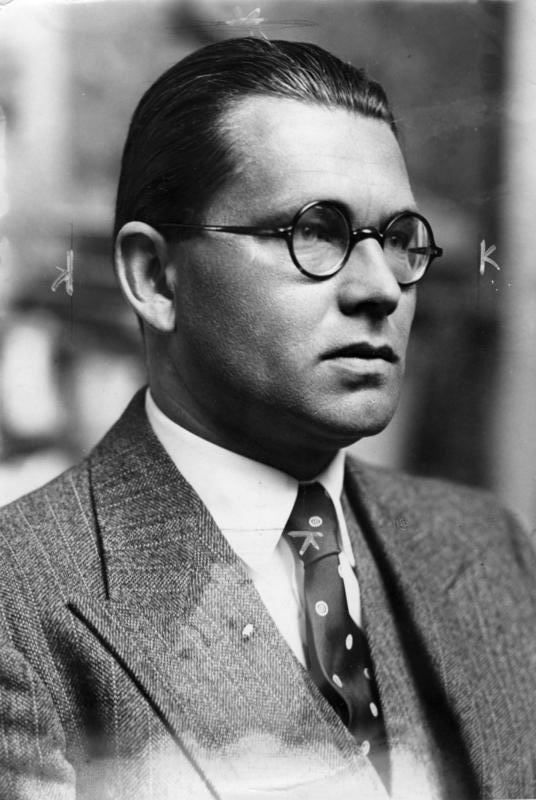
Philipp Bouhler, Head of the T4 programme

As part of the program later known as "Action T4", six killing centres were set up in 1940 and 1941 across the German Reich under the direction of the branches of the Nazi Party, overseen by a specially-created control centre for the extermination programme, established at Tiergartenstraße 4 in Berlin. These institutes were responsible for gassing 70,000 mentally ill and intellectually disabled patients from psychiatric institutions, retirement homes, nursing homes, and hospitals.

One of these extermination facilities was located in Pirna-Sonnenstein under the direction of its head, doctor Horst Schumann. His successors were Kurt Borm (code name "Dr. Storm"), Klaus Endruweit (code name "Dr. Bader"), Curt Schmalenbach (code name "Dr. Palm") and Ewald Wortmann (code name "Dr. Friede").

=== Timeline ===
In spring 1940 the Berlin euthanasia department had a killing centre established in a screened-off part of the institute's land. In the cellar of a hospital building – Haus C 16 – a gas chamber was installed and a crematorium was attached. The complex of four buildings was surrounded by a wall on the sides facing the Elbe river and a car park – still largely in place today. On the remaining sides a high board fence was erected to hide what was going on inside.

At the end of June 1940 the extermination institute began operations. In the years 1940 and 1941 it had a total of about 100 employees: doctors, nurses, drivers, orderlies, office workers, and police. Several times a week, patients from mental and nursing homes were brought to Sonnenstein by bus. After passing the entrance gate to the institute, which was guarded by a police detachment, the victims were taken to the ground floor of Block C 16 where they orderlies separated them into reception rooms for men and women. In another room they were presented one by one, usually to two doctors from the institute, who then fabricated a cause of death for the subsequent death certificate.

Following their "examination" the victims had to undress in another room under the supervision of nurses and orderlies. Groups of 20 to 30 people were taken down to the cellar under the pretext that they were going for a shower. There they were led into a gas chamber fitted out like a bathroom with several shower heads in the ceiling. Then staff closed the steel door to the gas chamber. An institute doctor came down, opened the valve on a carbon monoxide cylinder and watched the death process that, depending on the victim's build and endurance, took about 20 to 30 minutes.

After about 20 more minutes, the gas was vented out and the corpses were collected from the gas chamber by "stokers" and cremated in two coke ovens supplied by the Berlin-based Kori company. Before cremation, selected patients were dissected by the doctor and any gold teeth removed. The ashes of the victims were dumped on the institute rubbish dump or simply shovelled over the bank of the River Elbe behind the building at night.

The Sonnenstein Registry Office (Standesamt Sonnenstein) sent families of the victims a death certificate with falsified causes of death and a standard "letter of condolence". Men and women of all ages and even children were killed at Sonnenstein, including those from the Katharinenhof in Saxony's Großhennersdorf and from the Chemnitz-Altendorf State Institute. The patients killed at Sonnenstein came from the whole of Saxony, Thuringia, Silesia, East Prussia (e.g. from the Provincial Mental Sanatorium Kortau) and parts of Bavaria. By the 24th of August, 1941 -- when Adolf Hitler gave in to the increasing pressure of the Roman Catholic Church and issued the "Euthanasia Stop" order -- a total of 13,720 mentally ill and intellectually disabled people had been gassed at Pirna-Sonnenstein under Action T4.

== Precursor to the "Final Solution" ==
In addition, in summer 1941 more than one thousand inmates from concentration camps were executed at Pirna-Sonnenstein as part of Action 14f13. At the time the camps did not have their own gas chambers. The scale of prisoner transportation to Sonnenstein is still not fully known. Records show transportations from the concentration camps of Sachsenhausen, Buchenwald and Auschwitz. The mass gassing of almost 600 inmates from the Auschwitz concentration camp at the end of July 1941 marked the transition to a new dimension in war crime.

In the first half of 1942, under Action Reinhard, extermination camps were established for Polish and European Jews and other "undesirables" in what was then the General Government (the central administrative region of occupied Poland, which contained the Bełżec, Sobibór, and Treblinka death camps) and the Warthegau (the annexed territory in west-central Poland that contained the Chełmno death camp). All these camps were subsequently able to draw on the extensive experience gained under Action T4. About a third of the employees at the Sonnenstein killing centre were deployed during 1942 and 1943 to the extermination camps of Bełżec, Sobibor and Treblinka.

== Traces removed ==
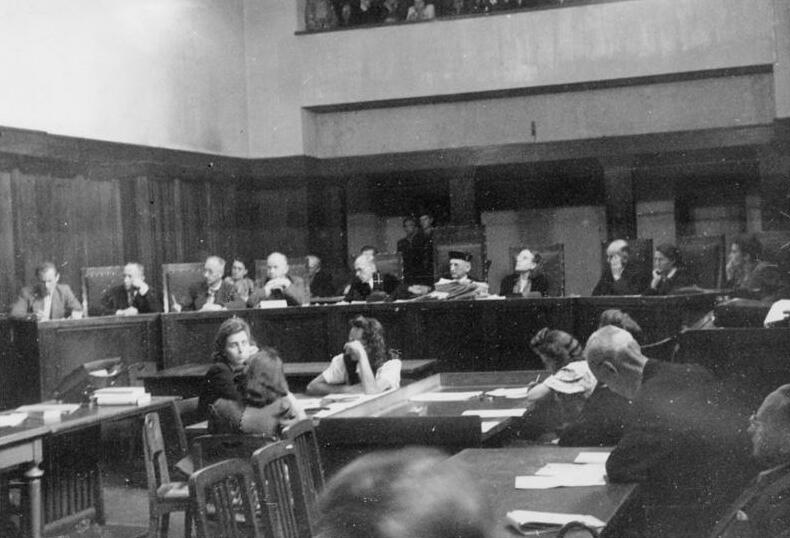
The jury courtroom in 1947 during the Dresden Doctors' Trial for the crimes committed at Sonnenstein

During the summer of 1942 the killing centre at Sonnenstein was dissolved and the gas chamber and crematorium dismantled. After careful removal of the traces of the crime, the building was used from the end of 1942 as a military hospital by the Wehrmacht. In the Dresden Doctors' Trial in the summer of 1947, some of the participants in the killings at Sonnenstein were held to account. The Dresden jury handed down four death sentences, including Hermann Paul Nitsche, who from spring 1940 was one of the medical directors in charge of murdering patients.

After the doctors' trial, the crimes committed were rarely mentioned in Pirna. During the time of East Germany, the story was repressed and largely concealed for four decades. A large factory was built on the Sonnenstein site that was kept shielded from the public; the firm used the buildings of the killing centre.

== Number of victims ==
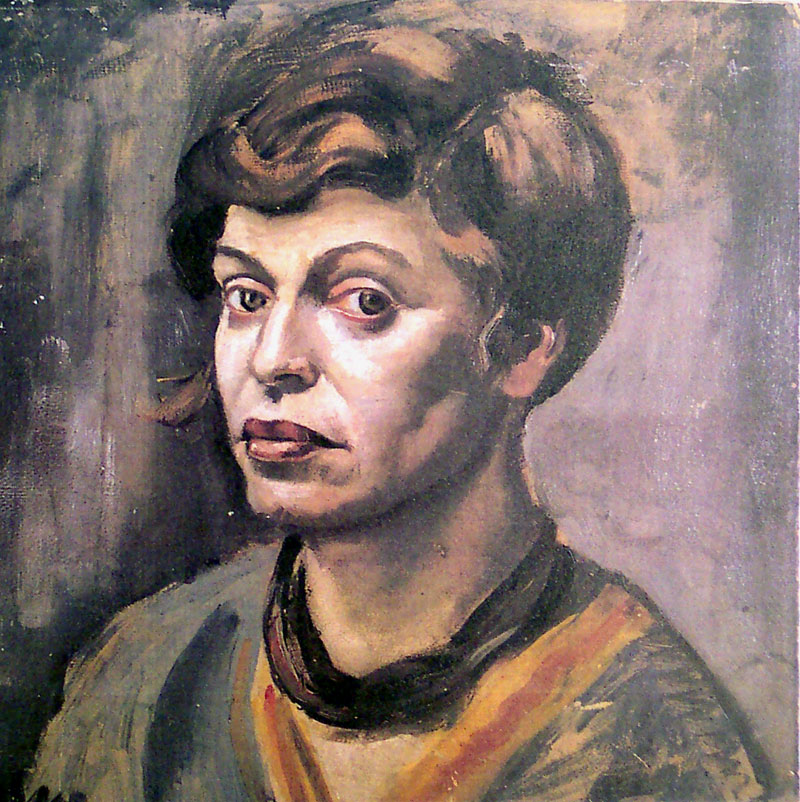
Self-portrait by Elfriede Lohse-Wächtler, who was murdered at Sonnenstein

According to surviving internal T4 statistics, in the Sonnenstein killing centre in 15 months between June 1940 and 1 September 1941 a total of 13,720 people were executed in the gas chamber:

1940							1941								Total
Jun	Jul	Aug	Sep	Oct	Nov	Dec	Jan	Feb	Mar	Apr	May	Jun	Jul	Aug	Total
10	1,116	1,221	1,150	801	947	698	365	608	760	273	1,330	1,297	2,537	607	13,720

These statistics only cover the first phase of Action T4, that was ended by an order from Adolf Hitler on 24 August 1941. After the temporary interruption of Action T4, a further 1,031 concentration camp prisoners from Buchenwald, Sachsenhausen and Auschwitz were murdered in Sonnenstein under the program known as "Action 14f13". One of the best-known victims was the Dresden artist, Elfriede Lohse-Wächtler. Likewise the church solicitor Martin Gauger, who came from Buchenwald concentration camp, was murdered in Sonnenstein under 14f13.

== History 1941-1989 ==
After the killing centre closed in 1941, the Adolf Hitler School (Adolf-Hitler-Schule Gau Sachsen), a Reich Administration School and a Wehrmacht military hospital were established on the site and lasted until 1945. Following the end of the Second World War, it became a refugee camp, quarantine camp for released members of the Wehrmacht, part of the Landrat office and a police school. These remained until 1949, with the exception of the police school which lasted until 1954.

From 1954 to 1991 a large part of the site was used by a continuous-flow machine manufacturer to build aircraft turbines. In 1977 the Pirna District Rehabilitation Centre was established on the castle grounds. In 1991 this grew into a workshop for handicapped people under the sponsorship of the workers' charity, Arbeiterwohlfahrt.

== Memorial centre ==
Not until autumn 1989 did its historic events enter the public consciousness in the town. On 1 September 1989, the 50th anniversary of the start of the Nazi extermination programme, a small exhibition about Action T4 by the historian Götz Aly was held, at the initiative of several townsfolk interested in bringing the subject to light. The exhibition generated a lot of public interest. As a result, there was a citizens' initiative to create a suitable memorial site to the victims of the Nazi euthanasia crimes at Sonnenstein. In June 1991 a society for the site was formed, the Kuratorium Gedenkstätte Sonnenstein.

Based on searches of the archives and archaeological investigations carried out from 1992 to 1994, the cellar rooms used for the exterminations in Haus C 16 were reconstructed in 1995 and arranged as a memorial centre (today building Schlosspark 11). The exhibition is located in the attic of the same building. The Saxon Memorial Foundation created a permanent exhibition to remember the victims of political tyranny and to document the crimes. It was opened to the public on 9 June 2000.

Today, the site is part of the memorial known as "Vergangenheit ist Gegenwart" ("The Past is the Present") created by Berlin artist Heike Ponwitz. All the boards carry a motif of the Sonnenstein Fortress based on a painting by the Electorate of Saxony court painter Bernardo Bellotto (1721-1780). Each board takes a theme connected with Nazi euthanasia war crimes, such as collective transport, letter of condolence,, special treatment, or bathroom.

The project is the result of a competition to erect a memorial for the 15,000 victims of Sonnenstein.

== Sources ==
- Böhm, Boris (1994). Geschichte des Sonnensteins und seiner Festung (in German). Pirna: Kuratorium Gedenkstätte Sonnenstein. OCLC 75621922.
- Klee, Ernst, ed. (1985). Dokumente zur "Euthanasie" (in German). Frankfurt am Main: Fischer. ISBN 3-596-24327-0.
- Böhm, Boris (2004). Stiftung Sächsische Gedenkstätten zur Erinnerung an die Opfer Politischer Gewaltherrschaft (ed.). Nationalsozialistische Euthanasieverbrechen: Beiträge zur Aufarbeitung ihrer Geschichte in Sachsen (in German) (1. Aufl. ed.). Dresden: Sandstein.
- Kuratorium Gedenkstätte Sonnenstein e.V. (publ.): Von den Krankenmorden auf dem Sonnenstein zur "Endlösung der Judenfrage" im Osten. Pirna, 2001.
- Frank Hirschinger: Zur Ausmerzung freigegeben. Halle und die Landesheilanstalt Altscherbitz 1933-1945. Böhlau, Cologne, 2001, ISBN 3-412-06901-9.
- Daniela Martin: "... die Blumen haben fein geschmeckt". Das Leben meiner Urgroßmutter Anna L. (1893-1940) Schriftenreihe Lebenszeugnisse - Leidenswege, Heft 21, Dresden, 2010; ISBN 978-3-934382-23-7.
- Thomas Schilter: Unmenschliches Ermessen. Die nationalsozialistische "Euthanasie"-Tötungsanstalt Pirna-Sonnenstein 1940/41. Gustav Kiepenheuer Verlag, Leipzig, 1998. 319 pages, ISBN 3-378-01033-9.

Other bibliography see main article: Action T4
