= Ida Maly =

Austrian painter (1894–1941)

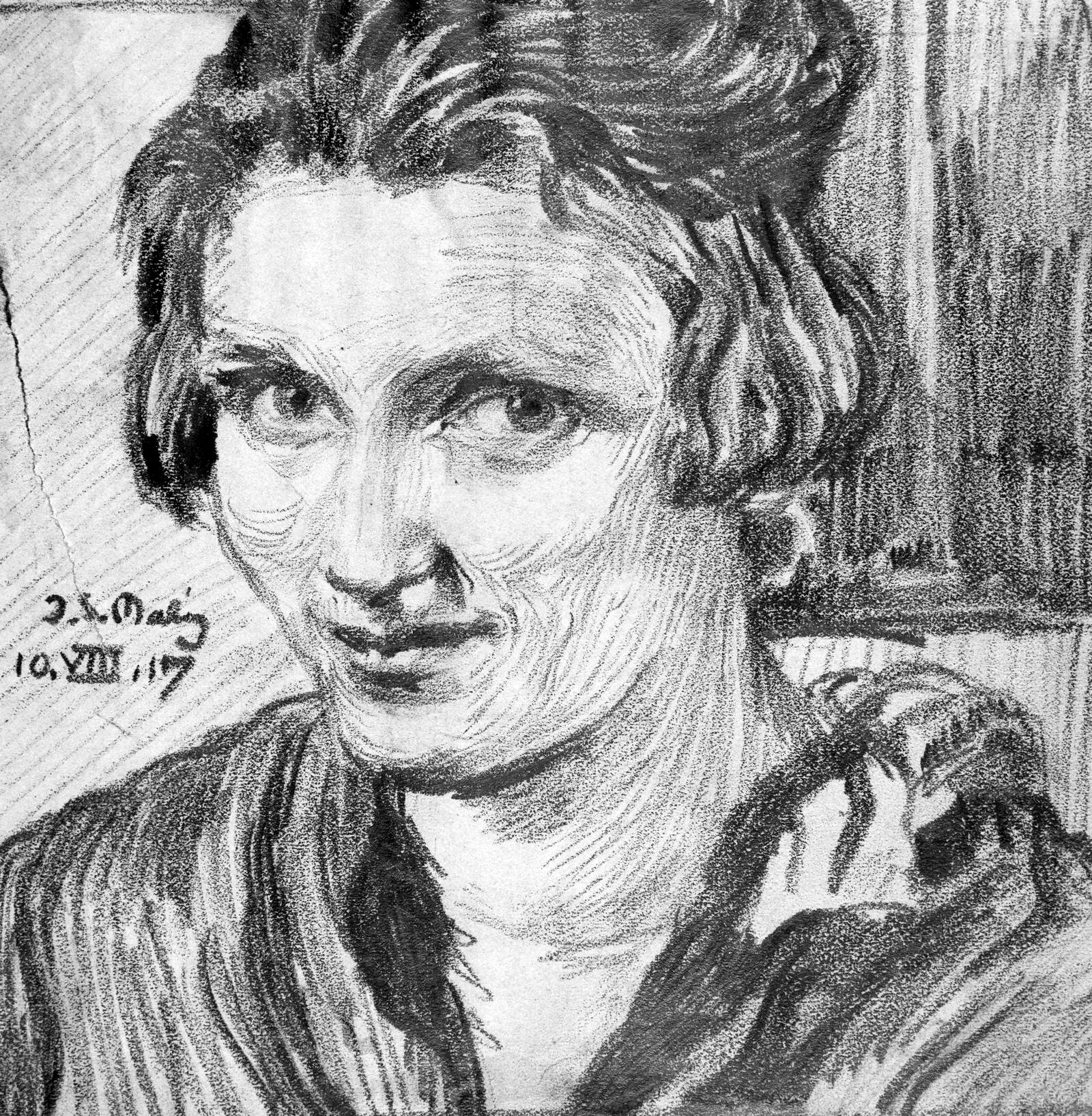
1917 self-portrait

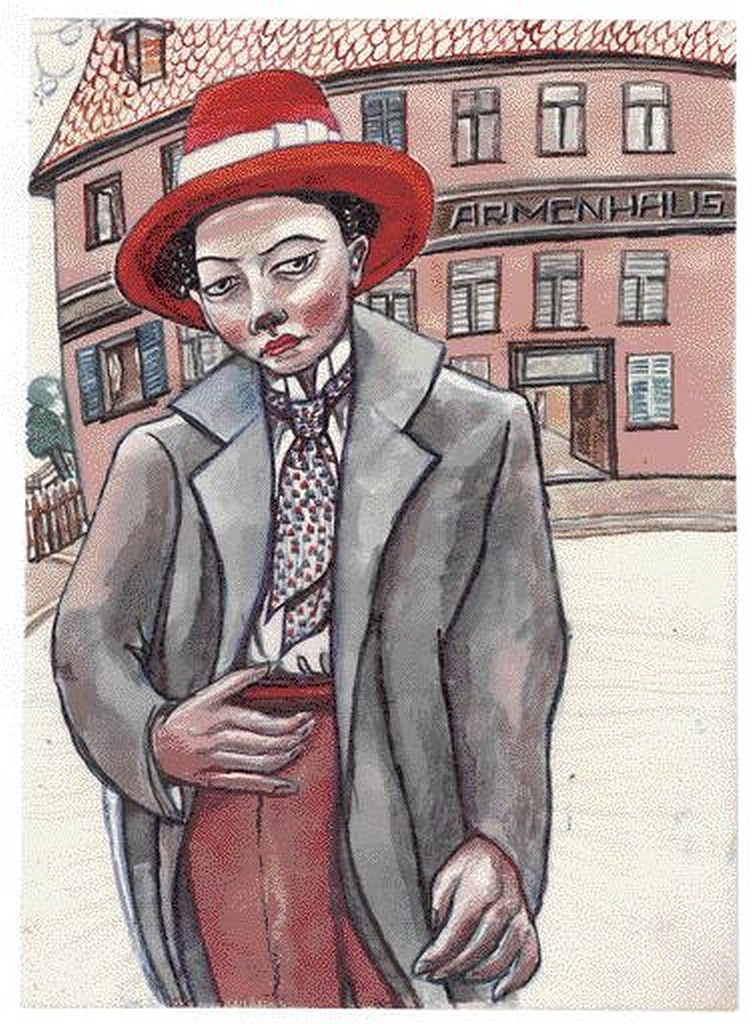
1928 self-portrait in androgynous dress

Ida Sofia Maly (22 October 1894 – 20 February 1941) was an Austrian painter of modern art who was murdered by the Nazi regime as part of their euthanasia policy targeting the mentally ill; she had been diagnosed with schizophrenia. Her works have been posthumously exhibited at the Lentos Art Museum and the Neue Galerie of the Universalmuseum Joanneum.
