= Action 14f13 =

Campaign of the Third Reich to murder Nazi concentration camp prisoners

Aktion 14f13
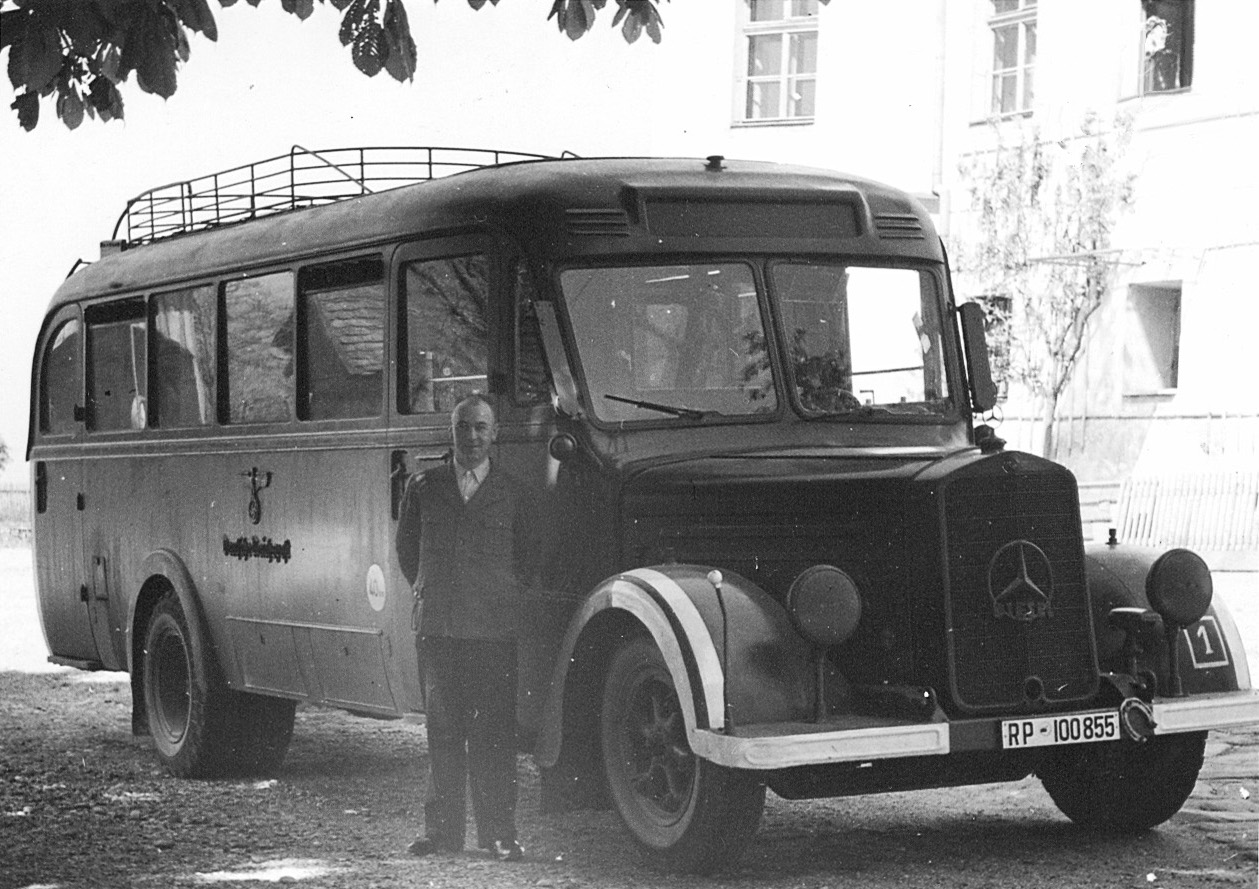
- A so-called "charitable ambulance" Gekrat bus
- Also known as: Sonderbehandlung 14f13 Aktion 14f13
- Location: Hartheim, Bernburg and Sonnenstein Killing Facilities
- Date: 1941–1944
- Incident type: Deportations to extermination camps
- Perpetrators: Heinrich Himmler, Philipp Bouhler, Viktor Brack, Werner Heyde, Horst Schumann, Richard Glücks, Arthur Liebehenschel
- Participants: Nazi Germany
- Organizations: Concentration Camps Inspectorate, SS-Wirtschafts-Verwaltungshauptamt (Amt D), Gemeinnützige Krankentransport GmbH, Deutsche Reichsbahn
- Camp: Auschwitz, Buchenwald, Sachsenhausen, Mauthausen, Gusen, Flossenbürg, Neuengamme, Ravensbrück, Groß-Rosen and Dachau
- Victims: 15,000–20,000
- Memorials: Das Denkmal der grauen Busse Traveling monument of the grey Gekrat buses

Action 14f13, also called Sonderbehandlung (special treatment) 14f13 and Aktion 14f13, was a campaign by Nazi Germany to murder Nazi concentration camp prisoners. As part of the campaign, also called invalid or prisoner euthanasia, the sick, the elderly, and those prisoners who were no longer deemed fit for work were separated from the rest of the prisoners during a selection process, after which they were murdered. The Nazi campaign was in operation from 1941 to 1944 and later covered other groups of concentration camp prisoners.

== Background ==
In spring 1941, Reichsführer-SS Heinrich Himmler met with Reichsleiter Philipp Bouhler, head of Hitler's Chancellery, to discuss his desire to relieve concentration camps of excess ballast, sick prisoners and those no longer able to work. Bouhler was Adolf Hitler's agent for implementation of Aktion T4, the euthanasia program for the mentally ill, disabled, and inmates of hospitals and nursing homes deemed unworthy of inclusion in Nazi society.

Himmler and Bouhler transferred technology and techniques used by Aktion T4 personnel to concentration camps and later to Einsatzgruppen and death camps, to efficiently murder unwanted prisoners and inconspicuously dispose of the bodies. Aktion T4 was officially terminated by Hitler on August 24, 1941, but it was continued by many of the physicians who had been involved, until Nazi Germany was defeated in 1945.

== Organization ==
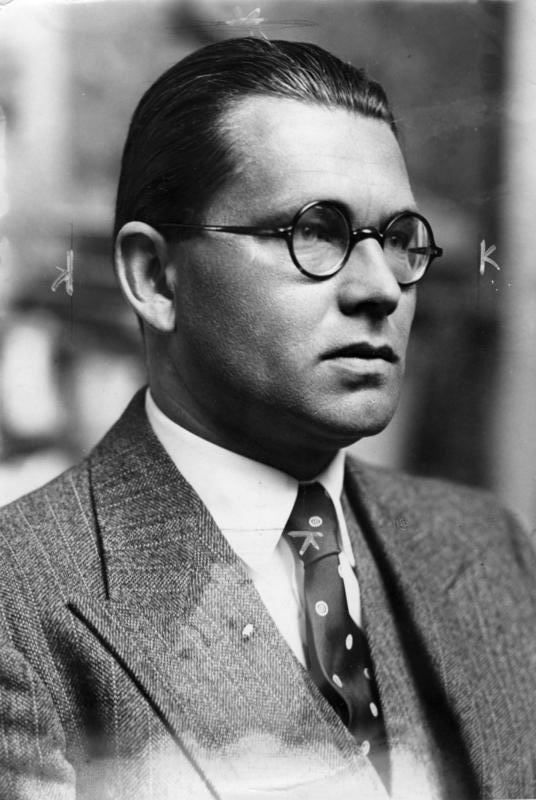
Philipp Bouhler, Head of the T4 programme

Bouhler instructed Oberdienstleiter Viktor Brack, the head of Hauptamt II (Main Office II) of the Hitler's Chancellery to implement the new order. Brack was already in charge of the various front operations of T4. The scheme operated under the Concentration Camps Inspector and the Reichsführer-SS under the name "Sonderbehandlung 14f13". The combination of numbers and letters was derived from the SS record-keeping system, 14 for the Concentration Camps Inspector, f for the German word deaths (Todesfälle) and 13 for the cause of death, in this case murder by poison gas in the T4 killing centers. (Note: Natural deaths were recorded with the code 14f1, suicide or death by accident with 14f2; 14f3 meant shot while trying to escape. The execution of Soviet prisoners of war in concentration camps were recorded as "14f14" and the forced sterilization of prisoners was recorded as "14h7".) "Sonderbehandlung" ("special action" – literally "special handling") was the euphemistic term for execution or killing.

== Selections, first phase ==
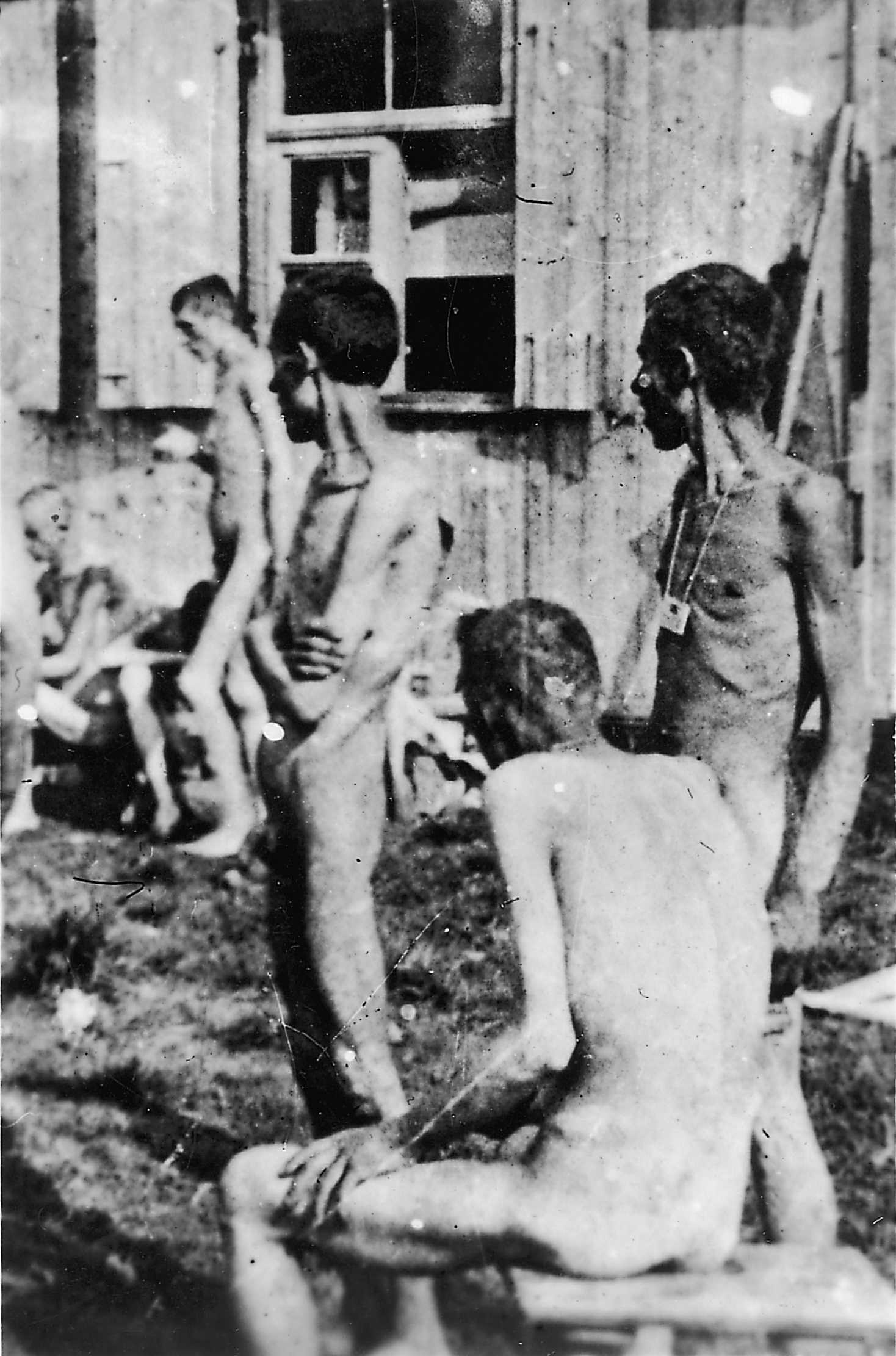
Buchenwald inmates on 16 April 1945, the day that the camp was liberated

After the operation began in April 1941, a panel of doctors began visiting concentration camps to select sick and incapacitated prisoners for "elimination". This panel included those already experienced from Aktion T4, such as professors Werner Heyde and Hermann Paul Nitsche and doctors Friedrich Mennecke, Curt Schmalenbach, Horst Schumann, Otto Hebold, Rudolf Lonauer, Robert Müller, Theodor Steinmeyer, Gerhard Wischer, Viktor Ratka, and Hans Bodo Gorgaß. To speed up the process, camp commandants made a preliminary selection list, as they had done in the T4 operation. This left just a few questions to be answered, such as personal information, date of admission to the camp, diagnosis of incurable disease, war injuries, criminal referral based on the German penal code and any previous offenses. Names of ballastexistenzen (dead weight prisoners) were to be compiled and presented to the medical doctors for withdrawal from service, which included any prisoner who had been unable to work for a long time or was substantially incapacitated and would not be able to return to work.

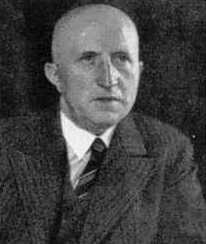
Paul Nitsche, a Nazi psychiatrist who was executed in 1948 by the Allies, partly due to his role in selecting prisoners for extermination

Prisoners in the preliminary selection had to report to the medical panel but there was no proper medical examination; the prisoners were questioned about their participation in World War I and about any war medals they might have received. Based on personnel and medical records, the panel decided how to classify each of the prisoners. The final assessment was made using the information in the reporting form and was limited to the decision as to whether or not the prisoner would be steered toward "special treatment" 14f13. The report form and results were sent for documentary registration at the T4 central office in Berlin.

Prisoners being considered for the preliminary selection were sometimes encouraged by the camp administration to come forward if they felt sick or unable to work. They were led to believe they would go to a "recovery camp", where they would have light duties. Many prisoners believed the lie and readily volunteered but, after they were gassed at the killing centers, the victims' belongings were sent back to the camp warehouse for sorting. Prisoners learned the true reason for the selection and even prisoners with serious illnesses stopped reporting to the infirmary.

The first known selection took place in April 1941 at Sachsenhausen concentration camp. By the summer, at least 400 prisoners from Sachsenhausen had been murdered. During the same period, 450 prisoners from Buchenwald and 575 prisoners from Auschwitz were gassed at the Sonnenstein Killing Facility; Hartheim Killing Facility was used to murder 1,000 prisoners from Mauthausen concentration camp. Between September and November 1941, 3,000 prisoners from Dachau and several thousand people from Mauthausen and neighboring Gusen concentration camp, were gassed at Hartheim. Prisoners from the Flossenbürg, Neuengamme and Ravensbrück camps were also selected and murdered. After November, another 1,000 prisoners from Buchenwald, 850 from Ravensbrück and 214 from Groß-Rosen, were gassed at Sonnenstein Castle and Bernburg. From March to April 1942, some 1,600 women were selected at Ravensbrück and gassed at Bernburg.

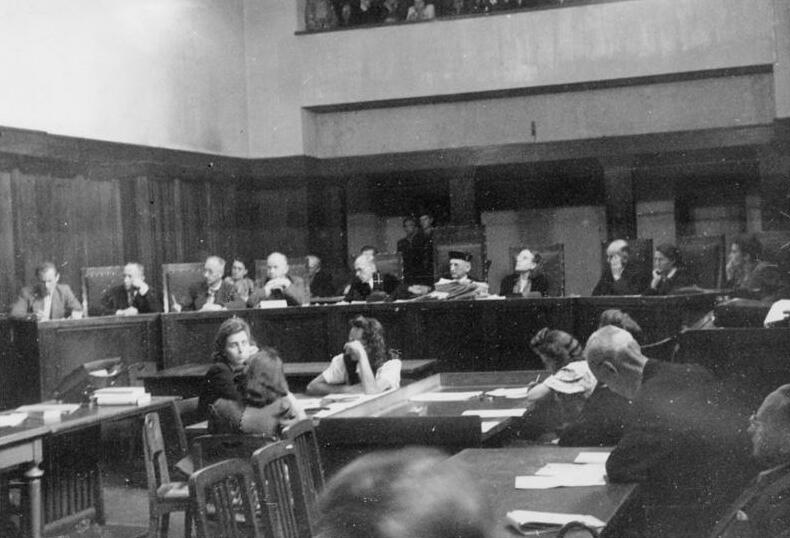
The jury courtroom in 1947 during the Dresden Doctors' Trial for the crimes committed at Sonnenstein Killing Facility

The "medical reviews" are described in an excerpt from letters written by Dr. Friedrich Mennecke; during a selection at Buchenwald, Mennecke wrote to his wife;

Weimar, Nov. 25, '41 8:58 a.m.

Elephant Hotel

First there were 40 forms to finish filling out from a 1st portion Aryan, on which my two other colleagues had already worked yesterday. Of these 40, I worked on about 15. ... Then came the "examination" of the pat.[ients], in other words, an introduction to the particulars & comparison with the notations in the files. We were not yet finished with these by noon because both my colleagues only worked in theory yesterday, so that I "post-examined" the ones who Schmalenbach (& I myself, this morning) had prepared & Müller, his. At 12:00 we first took a lunch break. ... Then we examined some more until around 4:00 p.m., in fact, I had 105 pat[ients], Müller 78 pat[ients], so that at the end, as 1st installment, 183 forms were done. As 2nd portion, now came a total of 1200 Jews, who will be entirely not first "examined", but rather with them, it's sufficient to pull from the files the reasons for arrest (often very extensive!) and transfer them to the forms. So, it's a purely theoretical job that takes us to Monday, certainly including benefit, perhaps even longer. Of this 2nd portion (Jews), today we did: I, 17; Müller 15. 5:00 sharp, we called it a day and went to dinner. ... The next few days will also go Just as I have described today, above – with exactly the same routine and the same work. After the Jews come about 300 Aryans as 3rd portion, who again will have to be "examined".

— Friedrich Mennecke

== Killing centers ==
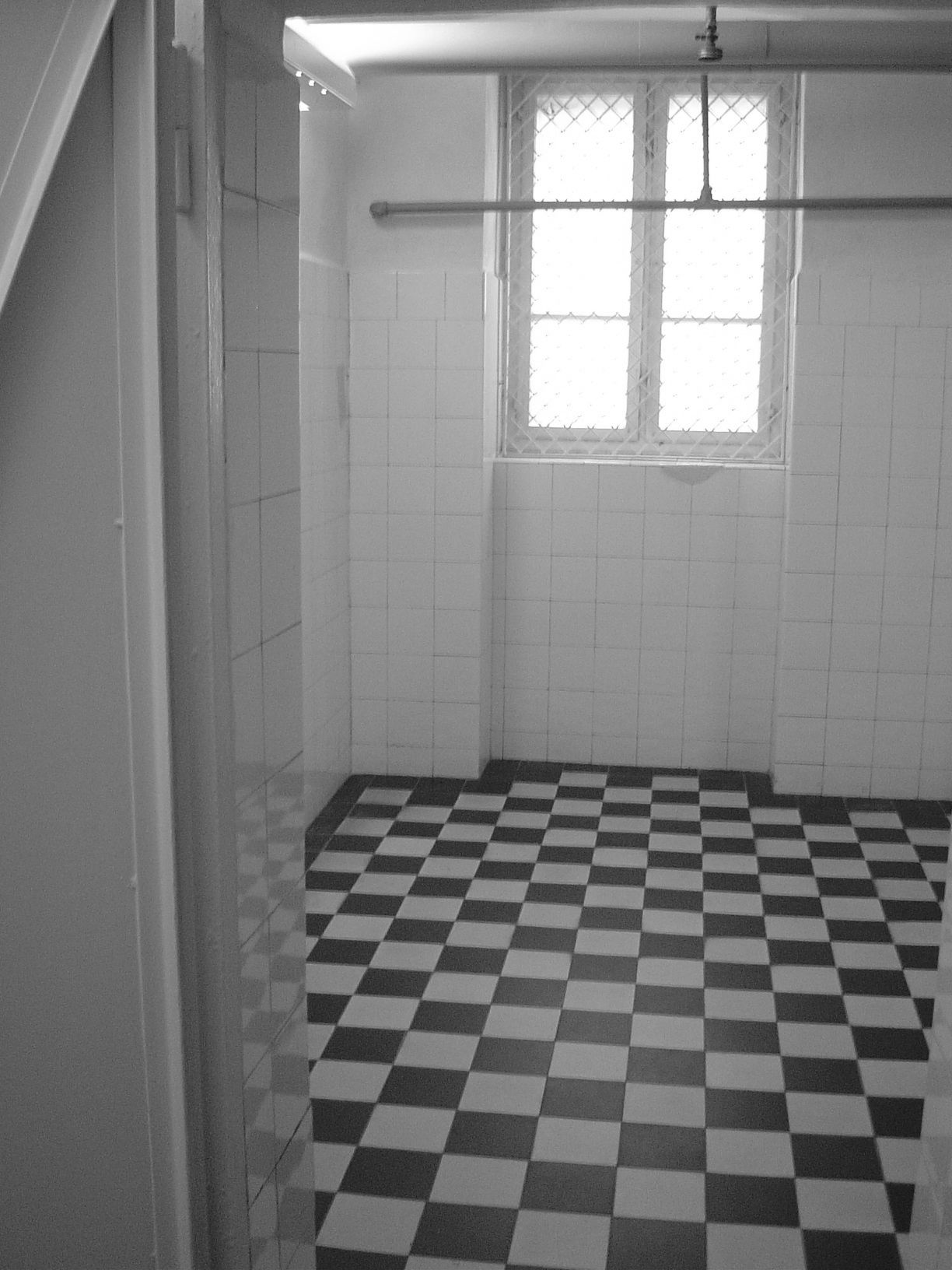
The gas chamber at Bernburg Killing Facility, designed by Erwin Lambert

Only three Nazi killing centers (NS-Tötungsanstalten) were used for the gassing of the invalided prisoners: Bernburg Killing Facility (manager: Irmfried Eberl), Sonnenstein Killing Facility (manager: Horst Schumann), and Hartheim Killing Facility (Rudolf Lonauer and Georg Renno). Under the code name "Aktion 14f13", prisoners from Mauthausen and Gusen were murdered at Hartheim Castle starting in July 1941.

After the doctors' commissions had invalided the concentration camps' prisoners, the camp administration had to provide them on request. They were transported either by the "Gekrat" or the Reichsbahn to one of the killing centers. The prisoners were examined for gold teeth by a prison doctor and labelled appropriately before being led into a gas chamber, where they were murdered with carbon monoxide. After any gold teeth were removed, for dispatch to a central office in Berlin, the corpses were incinerated in the crematorium; some corpses were examined further before incineration.

The murder was carried out by the same staff, using the same means as used previously with the mentally ill in Aktion T4. A few administrative details were changed, in that the murders were recorded by members of the respective camp administration; they informed relatives of the deaths, claiming illness as the cause. A detailed description was given by Vinzenz Nohel to the Linz Kriminalpolizei in September 1945, who were investigating Nazi war crimes that had taken place nearby. Nohel, who had worked as a "burner" in the crematorium at the Hartheim Killing Facility, was convicted at the Dachau-Mauthausen Trial in 1946 and sentenced to death, for the murder of sick and incapacitated concentration camp prisoners and was executed in 1947.

== Scope of selections ==
Selections increasingly included political or other persecuted peoples, Jews and so-called Asoziale. Pursuant to the general guidelines of the Bavarian police of August 1, 1936, those to be taken into Schutzhaft ("protective custody") were "gypsies, vagrants, tramps, the "work-shy", idlers, beggars, prostitutes, troublemakers, career criminals, rowdies, traffic violators, psychopaths, and the mentally ill."

Shortages of labour for the war economy led to a Concentration Camps Inspectorate (CCI) decree on March 26, 1942, which was distributed to all camp commandants. In 1942, the CCI was incorporated into the SS-Wirtschafts-Verwaltungshauptamt under SS-Obergruppenführer Oswald Pohl as Amt D under SS-Brigadeführer Richard Glücks. The decree was signed by Arthur Liebehenschel, acting in Glücks' stead.

It has been made known via a report from a camp commandant, that of the 51 prisoners retired for Sonderbehandlung 14f13, after a while, 42 of these prisoners again became "capable of work" and consequently didn't need to be sent. From this, it is evident that the selection of prisoners is not proceeding according to the stated regulations. The examinations panel may only choose such prisoners who match the regulations and above all, are no longer able to work.... In order to administer the work set up at concentration camps, the prisoner workforce must be retained at the camp. The camp commandants of the concentration camps are asked to focus particular attention to this.

The Chief of the Central Office

(signed) Liebehenschel

SS-Obersturmbannführer

A year later, the deteriorating war situation required further restrictions on selections, to ensure that every able-bodied worker could be put to work in the war economy. On April 27, 1943, Glücks presented a new circular decree with instructions to retire only those prisoners who were mentally ill or disabled.

The Reichsführer-SS and Chief of the German Police has decided that in the future, only mentally ill prisoners may be retired by the doctors' panel assembled for Action 14f13. All other incapacitated prisoners unable to work (those sick with tuberculosis, bed-ridden cripples, etc.) are categorically excluded from this operation. Bed-ridden prisoners shall be groomed for corresponding work that they can perform from bed. In future, the order of the Reichsführer-SS is to be heeded closely. The fuel requirements for this purpose are therefore dropped.

— Glücks

After these guidelines were issued, only the Hartheim Killing Facility was needed and those at Bernburg and Sonnenstein were closed, bringing the first phase of Aktion 14f13 to an end.

== Second phase ==
According to a command from April 11, 1944, new guidelines were issued and began the second phase of Aktion 14f13 in which no forms were filled and selections were not made by a doctors' panel. The selection of the victims became the responsibility of camp administrations, usually the camp doctor. This did not exclude the physically ill, who were no longer fit for work, from being murdered, which was done at the camp or by transferring the prisoners to a camp that had a gas chamber, such as Mauthausen, Sachsenhausen or Auschwitz. Those being gassed at Hartheim included forced laborers from eastern Europe, who were unfit for work, Soviet prisoners of war, and Hungarian Jews, as well as concentration camp inmates. The last prisoner transport to Hartheim was on December 11, 1944, ending the operation. The gas chambers at Hartheim were dismantled and traces of their use were removed, as much as possible and the castle was used as an orphanage.

The number of people murdered under Aktion 14f13 is not certain but scholarly literature puts the figure at between 15,000 and 20,000 people for the period ending in 1943.

=== List of Nazi killing centers ===
- Bernburg
- Brandenburg
- Grafeneck
- Hadamar
- Hartheim
- Sonnenstein

== See also ==
- Glossary of Nazi Germany for terms used during the Nazi era
- List of Nazi doctors
