= Helmut Kallmeyer =

German chemist (1910–2006)

- Born: 8 October 1910; Hamburg
- Died: 27 September 2006 (aged 95)
- Occupation(s): German chemist and Action T4 perpetrator

Helmut Kallmeyer (8 October 1910 – 27 September 2006) was a German chemist in the era of National Socialism. He served as a consultant in Adolf Hitler's Chancellery (Kanzlei des Führers) for gasification methods. Later, he worked in the Technical Institute for the Detection of Crime (Kriminaltechnisches Institut der Sicherheitspolizei, KTI). He was involved in Action T4, Nazi Germany's program to murder people with disabilities.

== Life ==
Kallmeyer was born in Hamburg, the son of a senior government surveyor. He passed his Abitur in 1929, and then studied chemistry at various universities. In 1939, he completed his studies at the Technische Hochschule Berlin and received his doctorate the following year. He was then drafted into the Kriegsmarine, the navy of Nazi Germany, and served until September 1941. Kallmeyer never was a member of the Nazi Party, nor was he an SS man, nor a policeman, but he did join the Sturmabteilung (SA), the Nazi Party's early paramilitary wing. He later claimed that, as a member of a German sailing club, he had been automatically transferred into the SA.

At the end of 1940, Kallmeyer married Gertrud Fröse, who had been working temporarily at Grafeneck Euthanasia Centre at this time, and whom he had met four years earlier at his sailing club. Among the wedding guests was Viktor Brack, from Hitler's Chancellery and Action T4, and for whom the bride had worked as a secretary. In September 1941, Kallmeyer was discharged from the Kriegsmarine for special home front duty.

Immediately following his discharge, Kallmeyer was personally recruited by Brack for Action T4. Along with August Becker and Albert Widmann, Kallmeyer was one of the three chemists primarily involved with the murderous program. These men, familiar with the uses of gas and poison, supplied professional services essential for the success of the killings. There exists little paperwork on Kallmeyer's involvement within T4, and the Kallmeyers' postwar testimonies appear to be withholding evidence. A letter from Alfred Wetzel of the Reich Ministry of the Occupied Eastern Territories to Hinrich Lohse attests that Viktor Brack wanted disabled Jews in Riga to be gassed by "Brack's devices". For this purpose, Brack offered his chemist, Dr. Kallmeyer, and other assistants. Ultimately, this plan was not carried out in the Baltic States.

After the war, Kallmeyer stated that he had never been in Riga. Rather, he was in Lublin in early 1942 for a particular job, the vocation of which he could not remember. At this time, the T4 perpetrators had been reporting to the Lublin region to start construction of the extermination camps. Supposedly, Kallmeyer returned to Berlin after a week, where he was ordered to start an analysis of drinking water. He was admitted to a hospital on 28 February 1942 with typhus. Upon recovery, he was transferred to the Technical Institute for the Detection of Crime (KTI). As with T4, Kallmeyer's name appears on KTI documents involving the delivery of gas and poisons to T4 euthanasia centres. Kallmeyer's letter from 2 May 1944 includes an order, on behalf of KTI, for "15 bottles of Kohlenoyd".

== After the war ==
In 1946, Kallmeyer was interrogated as a witness in connection with the Doctors' trial in Nuremberg. He denied having been aware of anything concerning the euthanasia murders. He downplayed his subsequent work at KTI; he claimed that he had never had anything to do with gas and poison. Kallmeyer and his wife admitted only to what could be proven by documents. Even though the investigating authorities did not believe the claims, the couple could not be proven to have partaken in the mass murder.

After the war, Kallmeyer worked as a senior civil servant in the Statistical Office for Hamburg and Schleswig-Holstein in Kiel and later for the Food and Agriculture Organization of the United Nations in Cuba and Ghana. The Kallmeyers met with Horst Schumann and his wife in Ghana in 1960. Schumann was wanted on account of his activities in the euthanasia centres of Sonnenstein and Grafeneck, and his later experiments in Auschwitz.
