= Albert Widmann =

German chemist and a SS officer (1912–1986)

- Albert Widmann (center) at his postwar trial, the Gaswagen-Prozess, in Stuttgart.
- Born: 8 June 1912; Stuttgart, German Empire
- Died: 24 December 1986 (aged 74); Stuttgart, West Germany
- Education: University of Stuttgart (PhD)
- Military career
- Allegiance: Nazi Germany
- Branch: Schutzstaffel
- Service years: 1939–1945
- Rank: Sturmbannführer (major)

Albert Widmann (8 June 1912 – 24 December 1986) was an SS officer and German chemist who worked for the Action T4 euthanasia program during the regime of Nazi Germany. He was convicted in two separate trials in the West German courts in the 1960s for his criminal activities during World War II.

== Early life ==
Widmann was born in Stuttgart. His father was a railroad engineer. Widmann studied at the University of Stuttgart, receiving his certificate in chemical engineering in 1936 and his doctorate in September 1938. Soon after, he was hired by Walter Heess, the chief of the Technical Institute for the Detection of Crime (Kriminaltechnisches Institut der Sicherheitspolizei, or KTI), who had previously employed Widmann as a temporary consultant. By 1940 Widmann had been promoted to chief of the KTI's section for chemical analysis.

Widmann was not particularly involved in politics. However, in July 1933, as a student, Widmann joined the National Socialist Motor Corps (Nationalsozialistisches Kraftfahrkorps, NSKK). He was admitted into the Nazi Party in May 1937. After Widmann joined the KTI, in December 1939 he was transferred from the NSKK to the SS with the rank of SS-Untersturmführer (second lieutenant).

== Action T4 ==
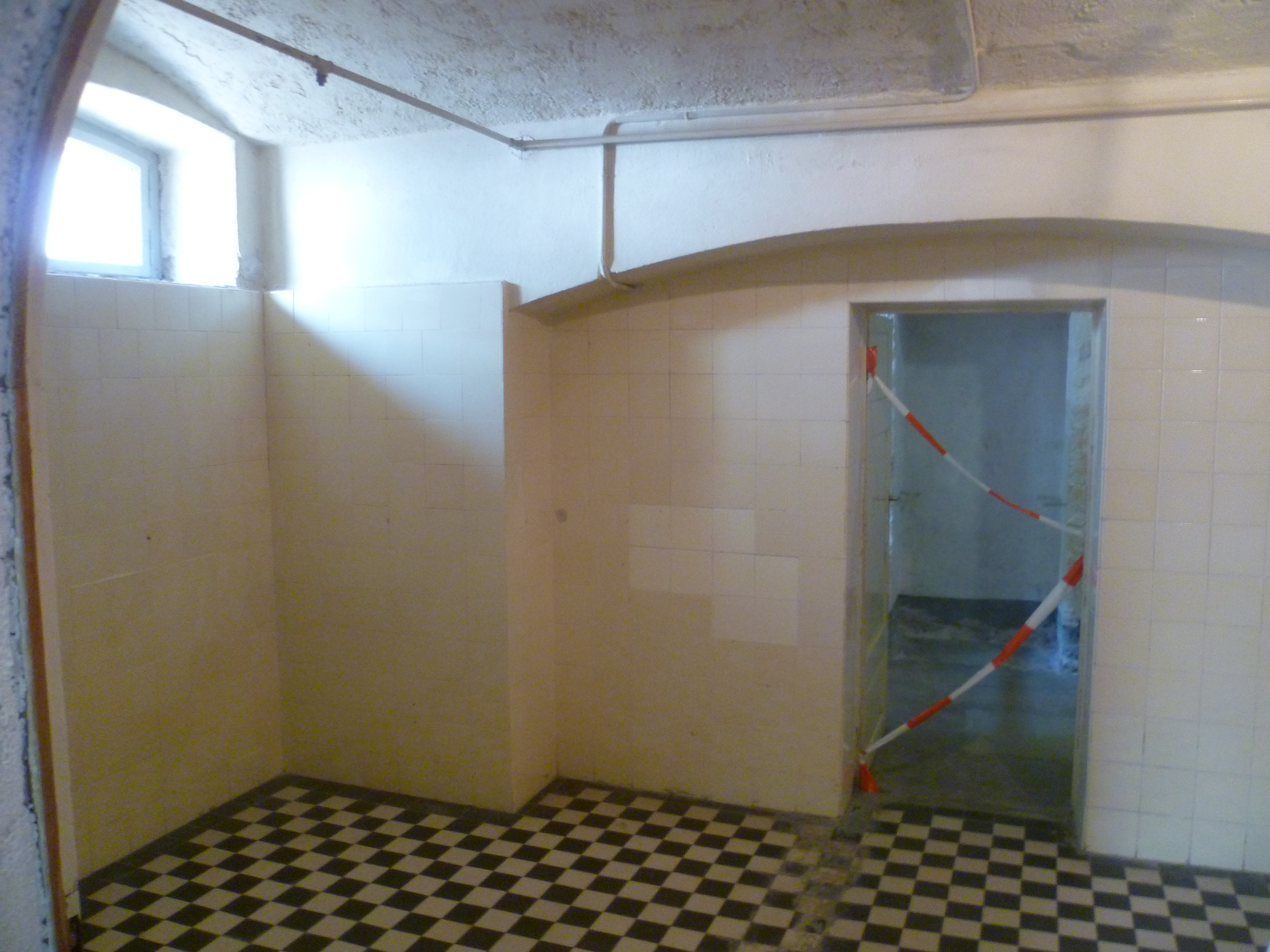
Gas chamber in Hadamar Euthanasia Centre

Widmann became involved with Action T4 from its inception. Along with August Becker and Helmut Kallmeyer, he was one of the three chemists primarily involved with the program. Although Widmann was not directly employed by Action T4, he and his KTI office provided the program with the needed support services. Widmann took part in the early discussions about killing methods, participated in the first Brandenburg gassing experiment, tested gassing and dynamiting in the occupied parts of the Soviet Union and, through KTI, obtained the necessary gas and poisons for T-4.

Widmann submitted the paperwork and obtained the carbon monoxide gas needed for the T4 killing centers to operate, as well as the "medicines" needed for killings in children's wards and "wild" euthanasia hospitals within the T-4 program. These wards were established in selected hospitals, eventually at least 22 throughout the German Reich, where doctors were recruited to kill infants sent to them. This was usually done by an overdose of common medication, supplied by Widmann. Over time the age limit moved from infants and children under three to older children and in some cases teenagers. Parents were deceived by local health authorities into believing that their children would receive special medical treatment. If they resisted, they could be threatened with loss of custody. An estimated 5,000 children had been murdered by this program by the end of the war.

Widmann also shared his technological knowledge. While others in the T-4 program were in charge of supervising and administration, Widmann instructed and experimented with gassing techniques. In the early stages of T-4, Widmann discussed possible gassing methods with Viktor Brack to determine the best way to kill patients with gas. For example, Widmann suggested releasing gas into the hospital dormitories while the patients slept, but this idea was dismissed as impractical. Widmann appeared at Brandenburg Euthanasia Centre to administer the first gassing experiment and teach the proper gassing method (for instance, how to measure the correct dose of carbon monoxide). Others who attended the first gassing included Philipp Bouhler, Karl Brandt, Viktor Brack, Leonardo Conti and Christian Wirth as well as other officials and physicians from T4 headquarters in Berlin. Widmann visited other T-4 centers only when solutions to technical problems needed to be tested, such as, when the crematorium in Sonnenstein Euthanasia Centre did not function correctly. For Action T4, Widmann had tested gassing on animals before recommending it as the means to kill human beings. One of the main goals of Widmann's work was to minimize the psychological impact that the killings bore upon the killers.

With Arthur Nebe, commander of Einsatzgruppe B, and an unnamed explosives expert, Widmann experimented with dynamite as a means to kill patients, and also tested ways to pipe gas from a motor exhaust to the interior of a chamber:

In September 1941, Einsatzgruppe B was faced with the task of liquidating the patients of the lunatic asylums in the cities of Minsk and Mogilev. Nebe decided to find a simpler way for his men to kill the mentally diseased, other than by shooting them. He contacted Kripo headquarters and asked for their help in carrying out the killing of the insane with either explosives or poison gas. Dr. Widmann of the Criminal Police was sent to Nebe in Minsk, but before he left, Dr. Widmann discussed with the director of the Criminal Police Technological Institute, Dr. Heess, ways of using the carbon monoxide gas from automobile exhaust for killing operations in the East, based on the experience gained from the euthanasia program. Dr. Widmann took to Minsk 400 kg of explosive material and the metal pipes required for the gassing installations.

Nebe and Dr. Widmann carried out an experimental killing using explosives. Twenty-five mentally ill people were locked into two bunkers in a forest outside Minsk. The first explosion killed only some of them, and it took much time and trouble until the second explosion killed the rest. Explosives therefore were unsatisfactory.

A few days later an experiment with poison gas was carried out by Nebe and Dr. Widmann in Mogilev. In the local lunatic asylum, a room with twenty to thirty of the insane was closed hermetically, and two pipes were driven into the wall. A car was parked outside, and one of the metal pipes that Dr. Widmann had brought connected the exhaust of the car to the pipe in the wall. The car engine was turned on and the carbon monoxide began seeping into the room. After eight minutes, the people in the room were still alive. A second car was connected to the other pipe in the wall. The two cars were operated simultaneously, and a few minutes later all those in the room were dead.

Another source states that instead of adding a second car, the first car was replaced with a truck. The idea to use gas was partly inspired by an incident involving Nebe. One night after a party Nebe had driven home drunk, parked in his garage and fell asleep with the car engine running. He had nearly died of carbon monoxide poisoning from the exhaust fumes.

This engine exhaust testing inspired the development of gas vans. Back in Berlin, Reinhard Heydrich immediately set to work within the RSHA for the development of, in the words of Heydrich's subordinate Walter Rauff, a "more humane method of execution" than the Einsatzgruppen firing squads which had been used. When a prototype gas van was driven to KTI, Widmann explained to his young chemists that by adjusting the timing of the ignition, one could maximize the amount of poisonous carbon monoxide in the exhaust. Widmann further explained that firing squads on the eastern front could be spared.

Some of Widmann's other experiments included testing poisoned ammunition on prisoners at Sachsenhausen concentration camp, which killed the subjects.

By 1944, he had been promoted to SS-Sturmbannführer (major). Problem solving was Widmann's specialty, and the kind of problem involved did not affect him. Widmann did not appear to be motivated by Nazi ideology, but rather saw himself as an expert determined to keep his job.

After the war, Widmann was interned by U.S. occupying forces for several days before taking a job in a paint factory. He had worked his way up to chief chemist by the time of his arrest in January 1959. He was sentenced by a Düsseldorf court to five years in prison for aiding and abetting murder through poisoned ammunitions experiments. After appealing, he was sentenced to three years and six months in October 1962.

During his prosecution, Widmann was asked how Arthur Nebe's order to kill mental patients in Belarus was related to Nebe's and Widmann's supposed assignment there - antipartisan warfare. Widmann's response:

I never thought about that question. After Nebe told me that he had orders to kill the mental patients in his area, there was nothing for me to think about. After all, mental patients were also killed in the Reich.

Widmann was tried again in Stuttgart in 1962. In September 1967, he was sentenced to six years and six months in prison. With time served before and after the trial, his remaining sentence was suspended in exchange for a payment of 4,000 DM to a non-profit institution for the disabled.

== See also ==
- August Becker
