= Werner Blankenburg =

Nazi Germany official (1905–1957)

Werner Blankenburg (19 June 1905 – 28 November 1957) was a high official in Nazi Germany who led the commission of numerous crimes against humanity. As section head in Hitler's chancellery, he was one of the persons mainly responsible for the Aktion T4 euthanasia program, the annihilation of the Polish Jews in "Aktion Reinhard", and the experiments with castration by X-rays in the Auschwitz-Birkenau concentration camp.

== Early life and Nazi career ==
Blankenburg was born in Caputh, Kreis Belzig (today Landkreis Potsdam-Mittelmark) in the Province of Brandenburg.

On 1 April 1929, Blankenburg entered the NSDAP (Nazi Party Nr. 124744) and the SA. In 1938, he became Oberreichsleiter (in the rank of SA- Obersturmführer) of section IIa in Hitler's Chancellery (Kanzlei des Führers). By that he was deputy for Oberdienstleiter and later SS- Oberführer, Viktor Brack the chief of section II which was responsible for affairs of the Party, State, and the Armed Forces. Later, Blankenburg became a SA-Oberführer and was eventually made Brack's successor.

== Aktion T4 ==
From July 1939, planning started for the mass killing of adults with intellectual or physical disabilities, later called "Aktion T4". In October 1939, although dated retroactively to 1 September 1939, it was Blankenburg who dictated to a secretary Hitler's authorisation to start the Nazi "Euthanasia" program. In this declaration, Reichsleiter Philipp Bouhler and Hitler's physician Karl Brandt were named directors of the program. Although, Bouhler left the administration of Aktion T4 largely in the hands of Viktor Brack and Blankenburg.

Since neither the Führer Chancellery nor the Reich Interior Ministry were supposed to publicly be shown as responsible for the program, dummy companies were founded which acted as fronts for the government. The Hauptamt II der Kanzlei des Führers, responsible among other duties for recruiting and appointing of personnel, equipment and controlling of the killing centers, is referred to in documents as Reichsarbeitsgemeinschaft Heil- und Pflegeanstalten (Reich work group for sanatoriums and care institutions). The members of the Chancellery also used fake names; Blankenburg's alias as deputy of the head of non-medical staff was "Brenner". At recruiting of non-medical staff for the Aktion T4 and the various killing centers it was, among others, Blankenburg who introduced selected candidates to the killing program and informed them that the actions were ordered by the Führer and therefore legal; though nevertheless the program had to be kept secret.

After the end of phase one of the "euthanasia"-program on 24 August 1941, the work of the Chancellery and the central headquarter of Aktion T4 was continued in the second phase, borne by "local initiative" rather than central organisation. Personnel freed from T4 duties was mostly transferred to the "Aktion Reinhard", which continued to be subordinate to the Zentralorganisation-T4, while technical orders were given by the SS and Police Leader of the Lublin district, Odilo Globocnik.

== Post-war life and death ==
In April 1945, Blankenburg and Viktor Brack—together with others of Hitler's Chancellery—were evacuated from Berlin to Bavaria. After the end of World War II, Blankenburg hid under the name "Werner Bieleke" (his wife's maiden name) in the Wangen district of Stuttgart. He worked as a bank clerk in Ludwigsburg, and later on as representative for a textile company in Freudenstadt. On 19 February 1949, Blankenburg became engaged to a nurse. In spite of being wanted by the police from 1945 to his death, Blankenburg managed to live quietly, even keeping in contact with his parents in an old people's home in Ulm. He further kept in contact with former colleagues at the Aktion T4. Brack, on the other hand, was executed in 1948, after being convicted at the Doctors' Trial. Blankenburg had been officially declared dead on 31 December 1945, upon request of his wife in 1956. On 28 November 1957 Blankenburg died in Stuttgart-Wangen and is buried there under the name of Werner Bieleke. At the funeral service numerous former members of the Aktion T4 were present, among others August Dietrich Allers and Erwin Lambert.

== Bibliography ==
- Ernst Klee: Euthanasie im NS-Staat. 11. Ed. Fischer-Taschenbuch, Frankfurt/M. 2004, ISBN 3-596-24326-2
- Ernst Klee: Was sie taten – Was sie wurden. Ärzte, Juristen und andere Beteiligte am Kranken- oder Judenmord. 12. Ed. Fischer-TB, Frankfurt/M. 2004, ISBN 3-596-24364-5
- Ernst Klee: "Werner Blankenburg" Eintrag in ders.: Das Personenlexikon zum Dritten Reich. Wer war was vor und nach 1945. Actualised Edition. Fischer-Taschenbuch, Frankfurt am Main 2005, p. 52. ISBN 3-596-16048-0
- Henry Friedlander: Der Weg zum NS-Genozid. Von der Euthanasie zur Endlösung. Berlin, Berlin-Verlag, 1997. ISBN 3-8270-0265-6
