= Gerhard Kretschmar =

German child euthanised in 1939

Gerhard Herbert Kretschmar (20 February 1939 – 25 July 1939) was a German child born with severe disabilities. After receiving a petition from the child's parents, the German Führer Adolf Hitler authorized one of his personal physicians, Karl Brandt, to have the child euthanized. This marked the beginning of the "euthanasia program" (Aktion T4) in Nazi Germany which ultimately resulted in the murder of about 200,000 people with mental and/or physical disabilities.

== Identity ==
Until recently the identity of this child had not been disclosed, although it was known to German medical historians. One German historian, Udo Benzenhöfer, argued that the child's name could not be disclosed because of Germany's privacy laws relating to medical records. In 2007, however, the historian Ulf Schmidt, in his biography of Karl Brandt, published the child's name, the names of his parents, the place of his birth and the dates of his birth and death. Schmidt wrote: "Although this approach [of Benzenhöfer and others] is understandable and sensitive to the feelings of the parents and relatives of the child, it somehow overlooks the child itself and its individual suffering... By calling the child 'Child K', we would not only medicalize the child's history but also place the justifiable claim of the parents for anonymity above the personality and suffering of the first 'euthanasia' victim." Schmidt did not disclose whether the child's parents were still living.

== Life ==
Gerhard Kretschmar was born in Pomssen, a village south-east of Leipzig. His parents were Richard Kretschmar, a farm labourer, and his wife Lina Kretschmar. Schmidt describes them as "ardent Nazis." Gerhard was born blind, with one arm, and missing either one or both legs. (Note: The original medical records are lost, and second-hand accounts vary.) Gerhard also experienced convulsions. Brandt later testified that the child was also "an idiot", albeit how this was determined is not stated.

Richard Kretschmar took the newborn Gerhard to Dr Werner Catel, a pediatrician at the University Children's Clinic in Leipzig, and asked that his son be "put to sleep." Kretschmar then wrote directly to Hitler, asking that he investigate the case and approve of the mercy killing of "This Monster" (as he described his child). As was usual with such petitions, it was referred to Hitler's private secretariat (the Kanzlei des Führers), headed by Philipp Bouhler. There it was seen by Hans Hefelman, head of Department IIb, which dealt with petitions. Hefelman and Bouhler showed the petition to Hitler, aware of his frequently expressed support for the "mercy killing" of people with severe disabilities.

Hitler summoned Karl Brandt, one of his personal physicians, and sent him to Leipzig to investigate the Kretschmar case. Hitler told Brandt that if Gerhard Kretschmar's condition was indeed as described in Richard Kretschmar's petition, then he, Hitler, authorised Brandt to have Gerhard euthanized, in consultation with the local doctors, and if any legal action were taken, it would be thrown out of court. In Leipzig, Brandt examined the child and consulted with Catel and another physician, Dr. Helmut Kohl. He also went to Pomssen and saw the Kretschmars. When Brandt informed the Leipzig doctors of Hitler's instructions, they agreed that Gerhard Kretschmar should be euthanized.

== Death ==
Kretschmar was killed in a hospital on 25 July 1939, possibly by lethal injection of phenol or other drugs. The Pomssen church register says that Gerhard Kretschmar died at Pomssen of "heart weakness" on 25 July. He was buried in the Lutheran churchyard three days later.

== Impact ==
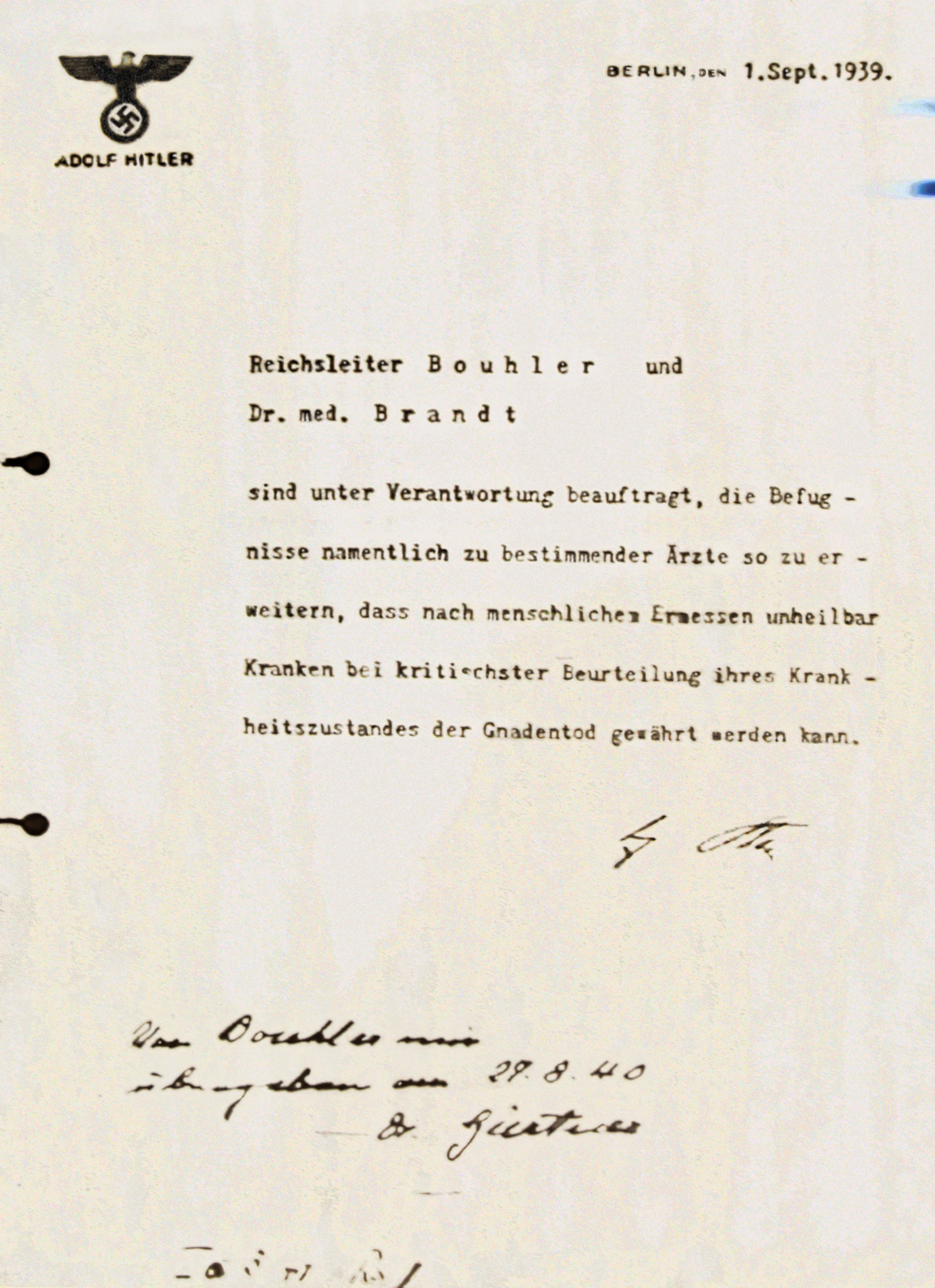
Hitler's written authorization of the T4 program.

Historians have called this case a "trial balloon", a case deliberately selected to test and trigger the implementation of the euthanasia program that had been prepared for months. In fact, the euthanasia of Gerhard Kretschmar was followed immediately with further actions in that direction, coming as it did shortly before the outbreak of World War II. In October, Hitler provided written authorization, backdated to 1 September, to Brandt and Bouhler to begin the systematic registration of children with severe disabilities, and to assemble a panel of doctors who would decide whether these children met euthanasia criteria. Registration began on 18 August, only three weeks after Gerhard Kretschmar's death.

== Bibliography ==
- Schmidt, Ulf (2007) Karl Brandt: The Nazi Doctor. London: Hambledon Continuum. ISBN 9781847250315
