= Johann Christoph von Ponickau =

German chamberlain

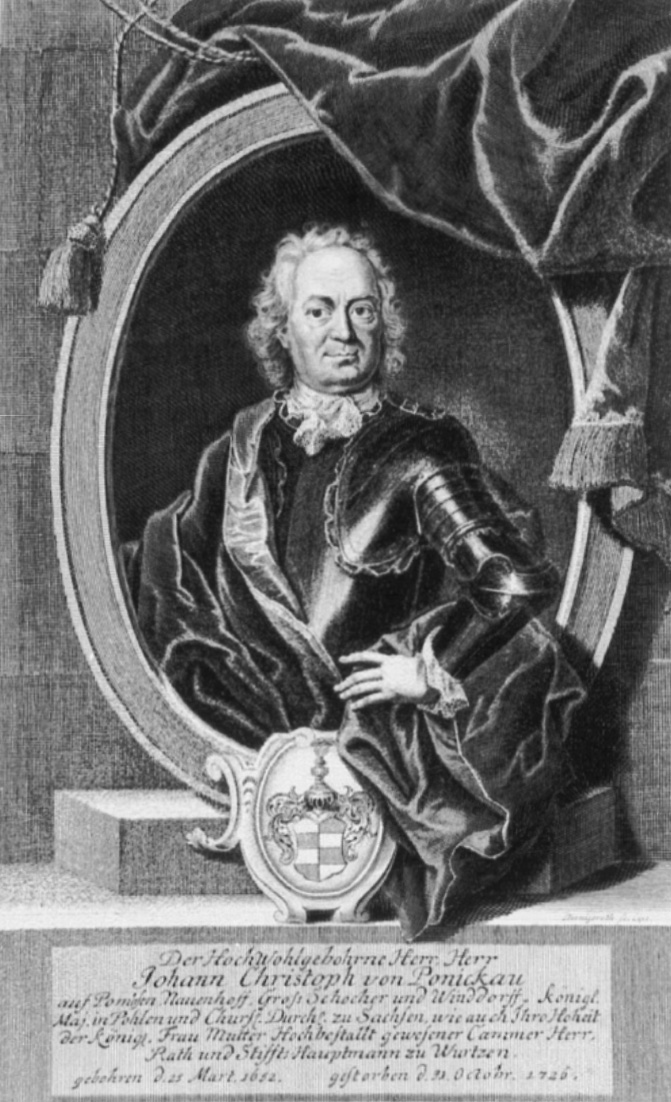
- Johann Christoph von Ponickau, engraving by Martin Bernigeroth
- Born: 21 March 1652
- Died: 31 October 1726 (aged 74); Pomßen
- Occupations: Counselor; Chamberlain
- Organizations: Kollegiatstift Wurzen

Johann Christoph von Ponickau (21 March 1652 – 31 October 1726), was a counselor and chamberlain at the Dresden court of the elector of Saxony.

== Early life ==
Ponickau was born on 21 March 1652 into the Ponickau family family. He owned several estates, including the Rittergut in Pomßen near Leipzig.

== Career ==
He was a counselor and chamberlain at the Dresden court of the elector of Saxony, who was at the same time King of Poland (Königlich-polnischer und kurfürstlich-sächsischer Rat). Ponickau was also head (Stiftshauptmann) of the Kollegiatstift Wurzen.

== Personal life ==
Ponickau was married to Eleonora Elisabeth von Bernstein. One of their children:

- Johanne Eleonore Caroline von Poickau, who married Friedrich Carl von Pöllnitz in Altenburg on 14 December 1727.

Ponickau died in Pomßen on 31 October 1726 at age 74. A memorial service was held for him at the Wehrkirche Pomßen on 6 February 1727, for which Johann Sebastian Bach composed a cantata, Ich lasse dich nicht, du segnest mich denn, BWV 157, for which Ponickau had selected the scripture text on which it is based.
