= Ich lasse dich nicht, du segnest mich denn, BWV 157 =

Church cantata by J. S. Bach

Ich lasse dich nicht, du segnest mich denn
- BWV 157
- Chorale cantata by J. S. Bach
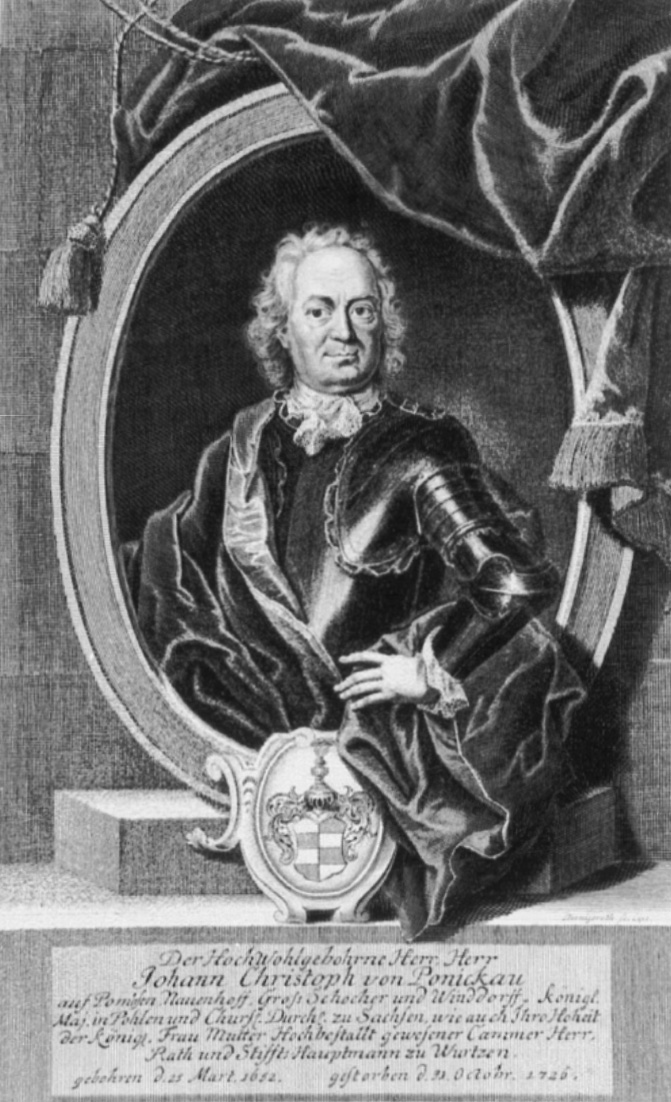
- Johann Christoph von Ponickau, for whose memorial service the cantata was composed
- Key: B minor
- Chorale: "Meinen Jesum laß ich nicht"
- Performed: 6 February 1727: Pomßen

Ich lasse dich nicht, du segnest mich denn (I will not let you go, unless you bless me), BWV 157, (Note: "BWV" is Bach-Werke-Verzeichnis, a thematic catalogue of Bach's works.) is a church cantata by Johann Sebastian Bach. He composed it in Leipzig in 1726/27 to a libretto by Picander. The first known performance was on 6 February 1727 during a memorial service for Johann Christoph von Ponickau in Pomßen near Leipzig. The work was later assigned to the feast of the Purification celebrated on 2 February.

Picander included a quotation from Genesis 32:26–32 in the first movement, and the last stanza of Christian Keymann's "Meinen Jesum laß ich nicht" in the closing chorale. The contemplation begins with the Old Testament quotation being applied to Jesus, and leads to the last aria expressing an eager wish for death to arrive soon. The closing chorale picks up the first line.

Bach structured the cantata in five movements. The original "chamber music" version (as reconstructed by Klaus Hofmann) was scored for two vocal soloists, tenor and bass, a four-part choir, and a Baroque instrumental ensemble of flauto traverso, oboe d'amore and continuo. In the later version, there are parts also for oboe, two violins and violetta.

== History and text ==
The cantata appears to have been commissioned as a funeral cantata for Johann Christoph von Ponickau, a Saxon chamberlain. Picander, Bach's librettist, clearly linked the cantata to Ponickau, publishing an extended funeral ode followed by the text of the cantata. The first known performance was during a memorial service for Ponickau on 6 February 1727 in the church of his home village of Pomßen, 20 kilometres (12 mi) from Leipzig. A printed commemoration sermon survives, with some information about the music performed which included a second Bach cantata, the now lost Liebster Gott, vergißt du mich, BWV Anh. 209. That work was written to a libretto published by Georg Christian Lehms in his Gottgefälliges Kirchenopfer for the seventh Sunday after Trinity.

For Ich lasse dich nicht, du segnest mich denn, Picander included a quotation from Genesis 32:26–32 in the first movement, but the line from Jacob wrestling with the angel is understood as a believer addressing Jesus. The closing chorale is the last stanza of Christian Keymann's "Meinen Jesum laß ich nicht".

The cantata appears to have been adapted for performance as part of Leipzig's church music, specifically for the Feast of the Purification of Mary celebrated on 2 February. The existence of more than one version is implied in the earliest surviving manuscripts, from after Bach's death, copied by Christian Friedrich Penzel. The primary surviving score dates from 1755, and there are parts from the 1760s. The prescribed readings for the feast day were from the book of Malachi, "the Lord will come to his temple" (Malachi 3:1–4), and the Gospel of Luke, the purification of Mary and the Presentation of Jesus at the Temple, including Simeon's canticle Nunc dimittis (Luke 2:22–32). The idea from Simeon's canticle to depart in peace has often been used as an image for the death of a Christian.

Only copies of parts of the later version are extant. In 1962, the musicologist Klaus Hofmann" reconstructed the original version, which he described as chamber music using "an exquisite combination of solo instruments".

== Structure and scoring ==
Bach structured the cantata in five movements, and scored it for two vocal soloists, tenor (T) and bass (B), a four-part choir only in the closing chorale, and a Baroque instrumental ensemble. According to the 1760 set of parts, the ensemble comprised flauto traverso (Ft), oboe (Ob), oboe d'amore (Oa), two violin parts (Vl), violetta (Vt) and basso continuo. Hofmann derived a version from the 1755 score for a smaller ensemble of flauto traverso, oboe and viola d'amore which may be closer to the one used for the first performance. The duration of the cantata is given as 21 minutes.

In the following table of the movements, the scoring, keys and time signatures are taken from Dürr. The continuo, which plays throughout, is not shown.

Movements of Ich lasse dich nicht, du segnest mich denn
No.	Title	Text	Type	Vocal	Winds	Strings	Key	Time
1	Ich lasse dich nicht, du segnest mich denn	Book of Genesis	Duet aria	T B	Ft Oa	Vl solo	B minor	common time
2	Ich halte meinen Jesum feste	Picander	Aria	T	Oa		F-sharp minor	3/8
3	Mein lieber Jesu du	Picander	Recitative	T		2Vl Vt		common time
4	Ja, ja, ich halte Jesum feste	Picander	Aria and recitative	B	Ft	Vl solo	D major	common time
5	Meinen Jesum lass ich nicht	Keymann	Chorale	SATB	Ft Ob	2Vl Vt	D major	common time

== Music ==
The opening movement sets a single line: the biblical quotation from Genesis which became the title of the cantata: "Ich lasse dich nicht, du segnest mich denn" (I will not let you go, unless you bless me). The movement has an eight-measure ritornello that opens, ends and bisects it, featuring a prominent imitative motif to the words "Ich lasse dich nicht". The two solo voices sing the theme, which was introduced by the continuo, in a canon. The movement is in six-part polyphony of the voices, flute, oboe d'amore and continuo. The counter subject is assigned to the blessing.

The second movement, "Ich halte meinen Jesum feste" (I hold my Jesus tightly), is a tenor aria accompanied by continuo and obbligato oboe d'amore, which perform a long ritornello serving much the same structural function as in the first movement. Craig Smith suggests that this is "perhaps the single most difficult tenor aria in the whole repertoire", with "wild and extremely ornate melismas". The aria, in a mellow triple metre, rests on two motifs, one with long resting notes, illustrating faith, and coloraturas standing for "mit Gewalt" ("with force").

The tenor recitative, "Mein lieber Jesu du, wenn ich Verdruß und Kummer leide, so bist du meine Freude" (My dear Jesus, when I suffer oppression and torment, then You are my joy), is "lushly" accompanied by strings. It recalls some of the motivic material from the first movement. According to Julian Mincham, "these details serve to remind the modern listener, armed with a score, of Bach's integrated approach to cantata architecture".

The fourth movement, for bass, "Ja, ja, ich halte Jesum feste, so geh ich auch zum Himmel ein" (Yes, yes, I hold Jesus tightly, therefore I will also enter into heaven), combines elements of aria and recitative. The mood, in contrast to the earlier movements, turns to joyful, even exuberant expectation. The scoring of flute, violin and continuo recalls trio sonatas by George Frideric Handel, Georg Philipp Telemann and others. The music opens with a ritornello. Structurally, the movement completes most of a da capo aria before a recitative episode interrupts the reprise of the A section. The music moves between aria and recitative twice more before a final aria section ends the movement.

The cantata ends with a four-part setting of the chorale, "Meinen Jesum laß ich nicht, geh ihm ewig an der Seiten" (I will not let go of my Jesus, I will walk beside Him forever), with a conjunct melody and active continuo line. The last line is the same as the first, connecting to the beginning of the cantata.

== Recordings ==
Recordings of Ich lasse dich nicht, du segnest mich denn include:

- Gächinger Kantorei Stuttgart / Bach-Collegium Stuttgart, Helmuth Rilling. Die Bach Kantate. Hänssler, 1983.
- Kurt Equiluz, Max van Egmond, Leonhardt-Consort, Gustav Leonhardt, Bach cantatas (Teldec), vol. 38. 1986
- Holland Boys Choir / Netherlands Bach Collegium, Pieter Jan Leusink. Bach Edition Vol. 14. Brilliant Classics, 2001.
- Amsterdam Baroque Orchestra & Choir, Ton Koopman. J. S. Bach: Complete Cantatas Vol. 18. Antoine Marchand, 2005.
- Christoph Genz, Peter Kooy, Bach Collegium Japan, Masaaki Suzuki. J. S. Bach: Cantatas Vol. 51. BIS, 2012.
- Georg Poplutz, Stephan MacLeod, Orchester der J. S. Bach-Stiftung, Rudolf Lutz. J. S. Bach: Cantatas Vol. 51. BIS, 2019.
