= August Becker =

German SS officer and war criminal (1900–1967)

- Born: 17 August 1900; Staufenberg, Hesse, German Empire
- Died: 31 December 1967 (aged 67); Laubach, Hesse, West Germany
- Occupation: Chemist
- Motive: Nazism
- Conviction: SS Membership
- Penalty: Three years imprisonment; ten years later imposed (released early)

August Becker (17 August 1900 – 31 December 1967) was a mid-ranking functionary in the SS of Nazi Germany and chemist in the Reich Security Main Office (RSHA). He helped design the vans with a gas chamber built into the back compartment used in early Nazi mass murder of disabled people, political dissidents, Jews, and other "racial enemies", including Action T4 as well as the Einsatzgruppen (mobile Nazi death squads) in the Nazi-occupied portions of the Soviet Union. Generally his role was to provide important technical support, but on at least one occasion he personally gassed about 20 people.

== Early life ==
August Becker was born on 17 August 1900 in Staufenberg in the German state of Hesse. He was the son of a factory owner. He was inducted into the German Army towards the end of World War I. Afterwards, Becker studied chemistry and physics at the University of Giessen where, in 1933, he earned a PhD degree in chemistry. From 1933 to 1935, he remained as an assistant at the university.

== Early SS career ==
By September 1930, Becker had joined the Nazi party, and in February 1931, he also became a member of the SS. From February to April 1934, he was occasionally active in the Gestapo office at Giessen before he finally left the university in 1935. At his trial on 4 April 1960, Becker testified that in May 1935 he was assigned to the SS-regiment "Germania" at Bad Arolsen, a small resort town near Kassel, the major city in the northern part of the German state of Hesse, in central Germany. During this time, Becker held the rank of SS-Oberscharführer and was concerned only with military affairs. He remained with this regiment up to 28 February 1938.

According to his 1960 testimony, Becker was then transferred to Berlin, to the Reich Security Main Office (Reichssicherheitshauptamt or RSHA), Office (Amt)VI, foreign intelligence. This agency was on the Bernerstrasse in the Grunewald. At this time Werner Best was in charge of RSHA Amt VI. Becker was responsible for the department replicating inks and photocopies. He was employed to detect whether written communications used invisible ink. At this time, he was promoted to rank of SS-Untersturmführer (Second Lieutenant).

== Action T4 killing program ==
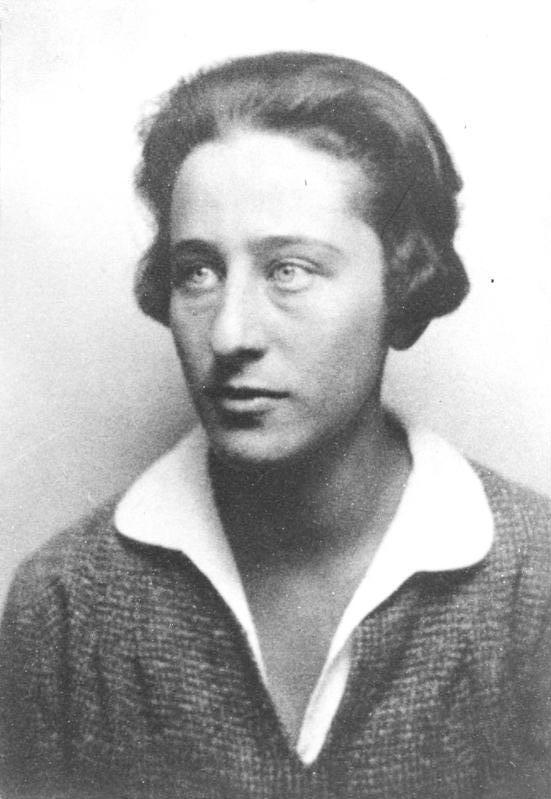
Olga Benário Prestes in 1928, later murdered at Bernburg Euthanasia Centre

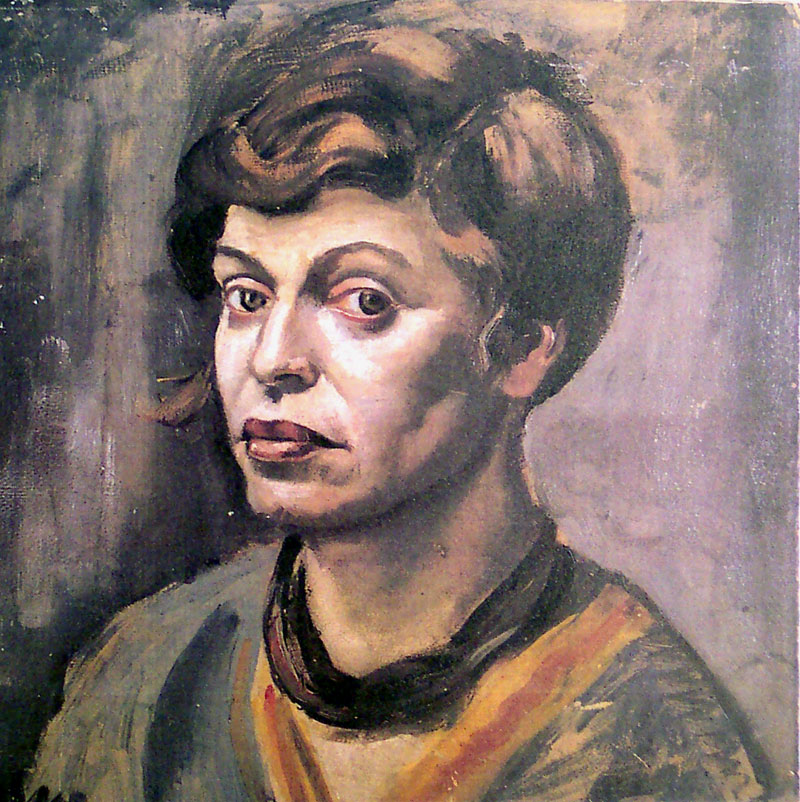
Self-portrait by Elfriede Lohse-Wächtler, who was murdered at Sonnenstein Euthanasia Centre

Becker remained with RSHA Amt VI until December 1939, when, shortly before Christmas, he received an order by telephone to report to Oberführer Victor Brack in the Reich Chancellery (Reichskanzlei). Becker went to Brack's office that same day. Brack was part of the office of the Führer Chancellery (Kanzlei des Führers). According to Becker, Brack told him the following:

- At the personal command of (Reichsführer-SS) Himmler, Becker was deputed to Brack;
- Becker's assignment would be to carry out a "euthanasia" program to destroy all "idiots" and mental patients;
- The killing would be done with carbon monoxide gas. This gas had already been studied by a chemist, Albert Widmann, with the Office of the National Criminal Police (RKPA) in Berlin to assess its utility.
- Becker "didn't need to have any scruples with this thing, because the killing of these people would be made lawful by a Führer directive.

This program was known as Action T4.

Becker participated in the first "test", gassing 18 to 20 mentally ill convicts in a former prison known by the euphemistic name of Landes-Pflegeanstalt Brandenburg an der Havel, which later became known to history as a Nazi killing center (NS-Tötungsanstalt). Among the Action T4 personnel, Becker was called "the Red Becker" because of his hair color and also probably to avoid confusion with the similarly named Hans Joachim Becker, director of the Zentralverrechnungstelle welfare and institutes for care. After the war, Brack was placed on trial for war crimes and crimes against humanity. Brack named Becker among 24 main responsible people for Action T4 in a list Brack produced for the Allied occupying authorities.

=== Setting up the first gas chamber ===
According to Becker's testimony at the trial of Werner Heyde, the first medical director of Action T4, in the first half January 1940, Becker drove to the Brandenburg institute, where buildings had been prepared specially for this purpose. An area resembling a shower room with shower heads was laid out, about 3 meters by 5 meters in floor size, with a ceiling about three meters high.

A pipe ran around the walls of the room, and in the pipe were small holes, out of which the carbon monoxide gas flowed. The gas bottles stood outside the area and were already attached to the supply pipe. The assembly of the plant was accomplished by a mechanic of the SS-principal office Berlin. The gas-tight entrance door (Gasdichttür) included an observation port through which the behavior of the delinquents (Delinquenten) could be observed during the course of the gassing.

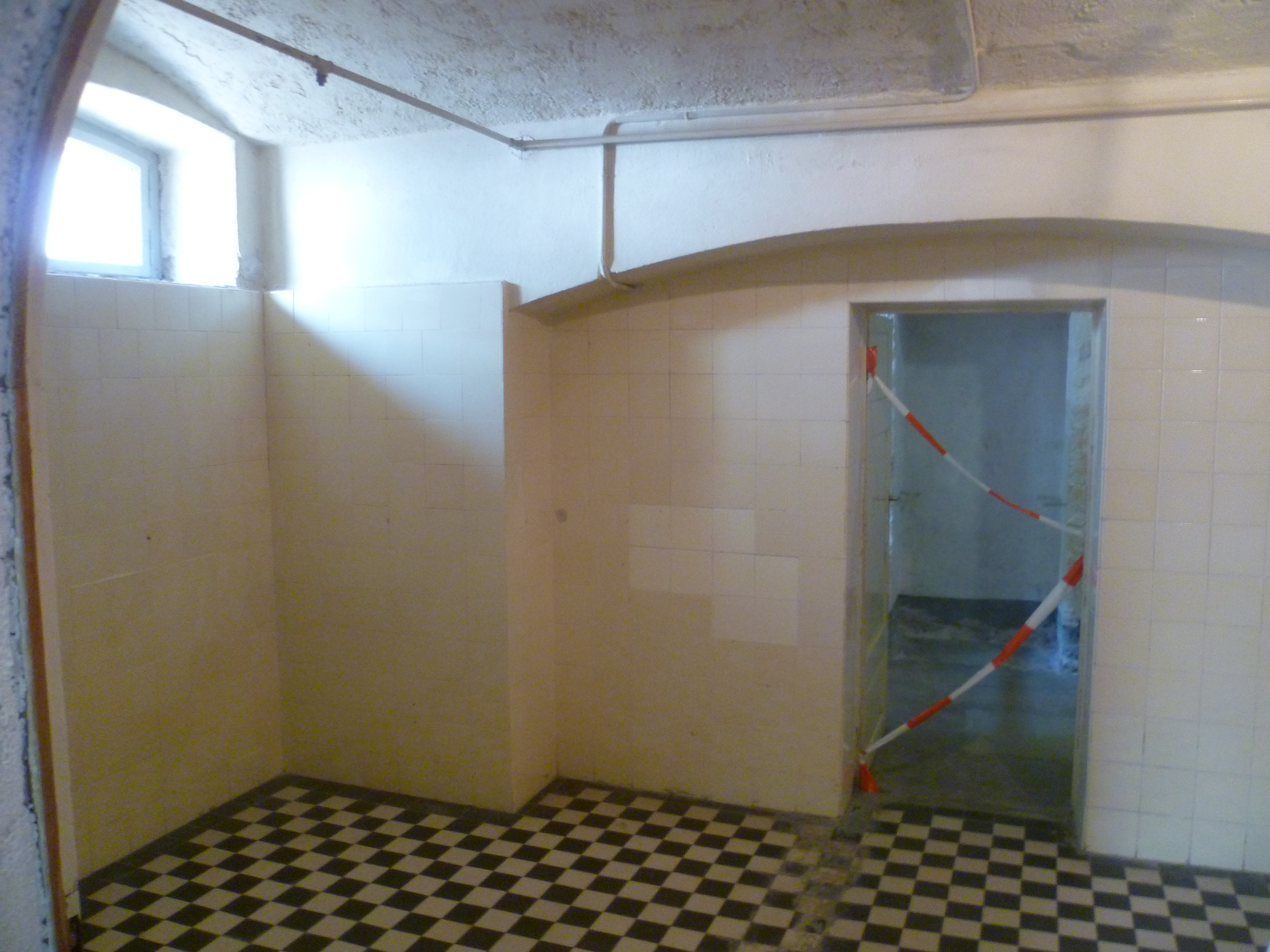
Gas chamber in Hadamar Euthanasia Centre

For the first gassing the maintenance personnel led about 18–20 persons into the disguised gas chamber. These men had had to undress in an antechamber (Vorraum), so that they were completely naked. The door was locked behind them. According to Becker, the victims went calmly into the area and showed no signs of agitation. As Widmann let in the gas Becker watched through the observation port. After about one minute, the victims fell down and lay on top of one another. Becker said he saw no scenes or tumult. After a further five minutes the area was aired out. At this point, using specially designed stretchers, SS personnel cleared the bodies out of the area and took them to the incinerators.

Becker's boss, Victor Brack, and his office had designed the stretchers and the incinerator equipment, which was intended to allow mechanical feeding of the corpses into the furnace. Brack was present at this first gassing to observe his system in operation. According to Becker, afterwards Brack appeared satisfied, and made some remarks, saying that "this action should be accomplished only by the physicians" and recited the saying that "the syringe belonged into the hand of the physician." Subsequently, professor Dr. Brandt spoke and stressed likewise that only physicians would carry out these gassings. At the same time, Widmann informed the institute physician Dr. Eberl and Dr. Baumhart, who later took over extermination efforts at Grafeneck and at Hadamar. The second gassing trial and later extermination measures were accomplished thereafter by Eberl alone and on his own authority.

=== Ongoing gassing program ===
The Brandenburg gassing, together with the gassings of Polish mental patients that the SS-Sonderkommando had carried out in the autumn 1939 gas chamber in Fort VII at Posen, led to the specification that the T4 victims should also be killed with CO gas. Becker was assigned to instruct the physicians, who were to set up six "institutes" for gassing, the first of which was at Grafeneck. According to Becker's later testimony, around the end of January 1940, he brought the gas bottles out from Brandenburg to Grafeneck Castle, to put the institute there "into operation", that is, to start the killing program there. Originally, a Dr. Schumann was to operate the CO valve, but Schumann let the gas flow too quickly, causing it to hiss loudly inside the "shower room". This caused the victims, whom Becker called, even years later, the "delinquents" to become agitated. Becker took over manometers from Schumann. He slowed down the gas infusion into the chamber, which caused the victims to calm down and die shortly thereafter.

Up to the end of Action T4 in August 1941, Becker's job was to arrange delivery of CO bottles from the I.G. Farben plant in Ludwigshafen to the killing facilities. The purchase orders for the gas were made by Albert Widmann of the Criminal Technology Institute (Kriminaltechnische Institut) or (KTI), of the Central National Security Office (RSHA). Like Becker, Widmann was also tried in a German court after the war. In Widmann's case, the court, based in Stuttgart found that Widmann's role was to order the CO gas bottles to conceal the fact that the purchase orders were coming from a party agency, and in particular, from the Führer Chancellery. This was decided upon by Becker and Widmann's superior, Victor Brack, at the Führer Chancellery, but it had been previously suggested by Arthur Nebe. Widmann received from the individual killing institutes their CO demand. He then ordered the CO gas bottles from the Baden Aniline and Soda Works in Ludwigshafen orders, giving KTI as the purchaser. Widmann then sent the order and supply confirmations to Becker, who was working at the Führer Chancellery arranging for their delivery to the individual institutes.

=== The Einsatzgruppen ===
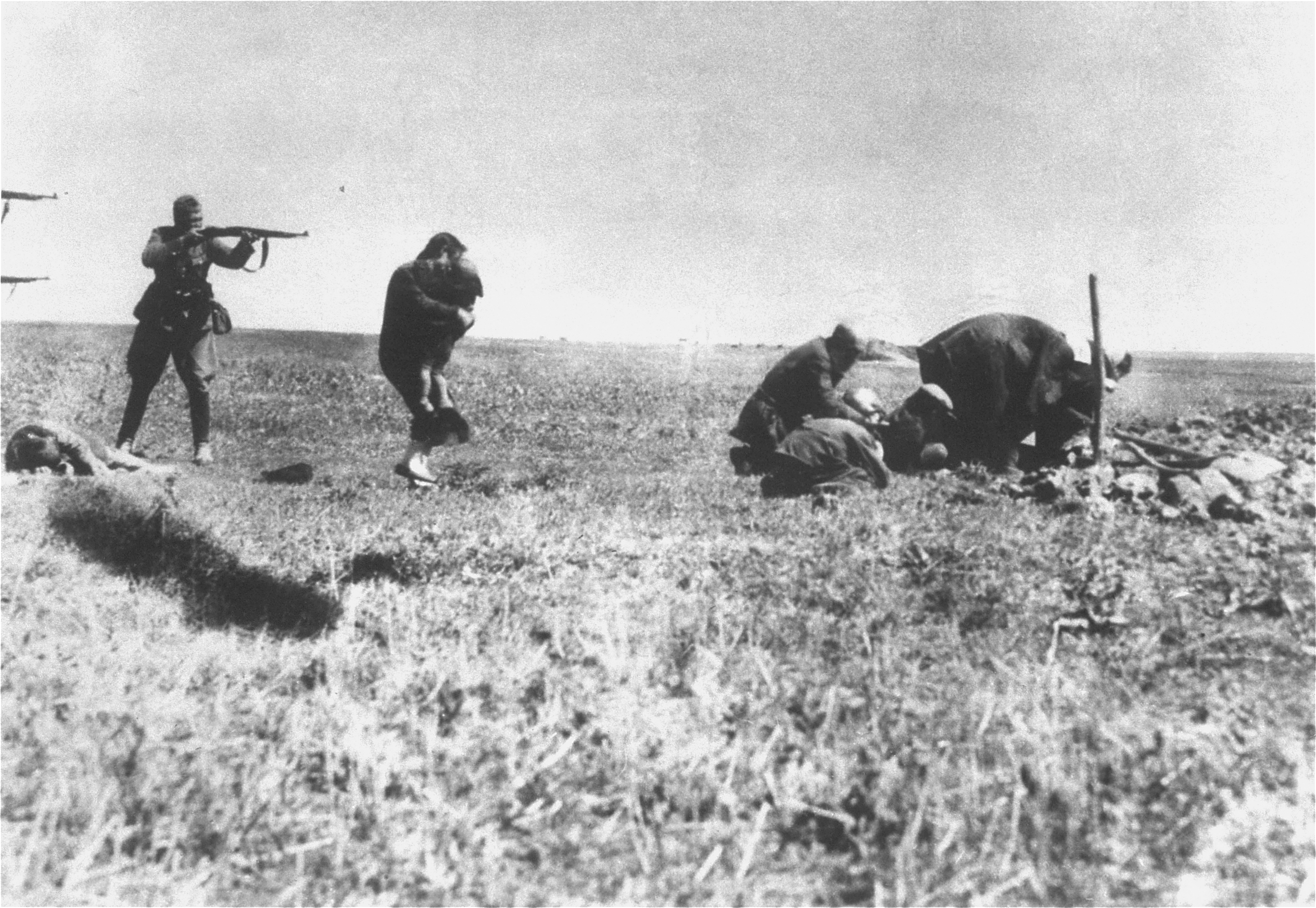
Killing of Jews at Ivangorod, Ukraine, 1942. A woman is attempting to protect a child with her own body just before they are fired on with rifles at close range.

In October 1941, Becker was used again in the Central Reich Security Office and assigned to department II D 3 A under Friedrich Pradel. This was responsible for the Kraftfahrwesen of the state police. The director of department D (technical affairs), SS-Obersturmbannführer Walter Rauff, assigned Becker in December 1941 the inspection of the gas vans with the Einsatzgruppen, a Nazi bureaucratic term which technically meant "Special Task Group". In fact, the Einsatzgruppen were Nazi killing squads that roved about Nazi-occupied Eastern Europe and organized the mass murder of Jews prior to the invention of the death camps. These included, among others, Gypsies, communists, and especially Jews. While there were some variations (see Friedrich Jeckeln), typically the way this was done was to have a trench dug by prisoners of war, with the local population of "undesirables" rounded up by intimidation or force, sometimes with the aid of local collaborators, and then they would be shot with one bullet per victim by an SS man. In this manner, and with the aid of a good number of people to catch, guard, and force-march the victims to the killing site, 10 or 12 shooters could kill 12,000 people in a single day.

=== Gas van operations ===
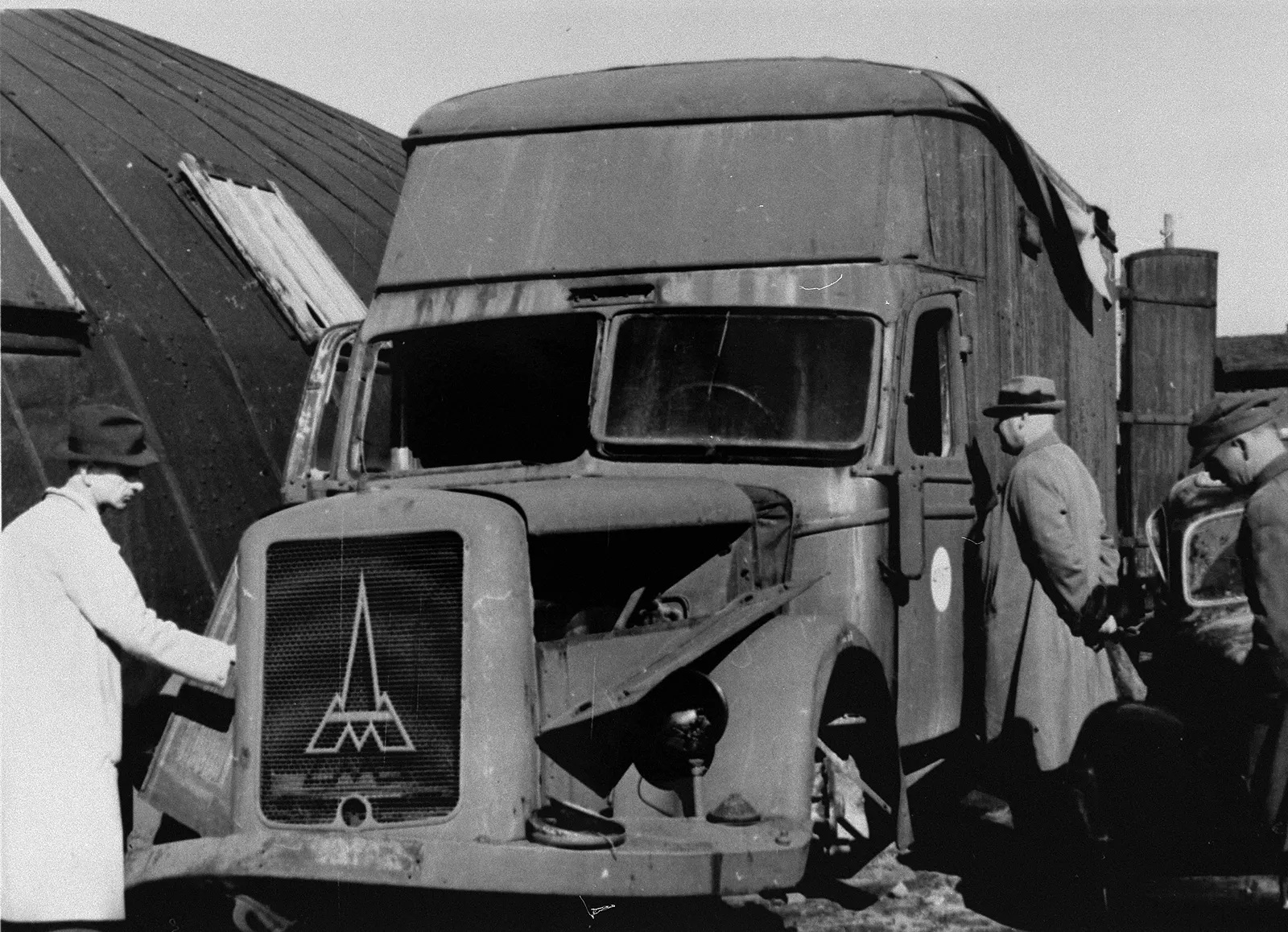
A destroyed Magirus-Deutz van found in 1945 in Koło (Kolo), Poland, not far from the Kulmhof (Chelmno) extermination camp. The same type of van was used by the Nazis for suffocation, with the exhaust fumes diverted into the sealed rear compartment where the victims were locked in. This particular van has not been modified yet.

To lessen the psychological impact on the killers of the one-on-one style of killing that had characterized Einsatzgruppen operations, the SS, at the direction of Heinrich Himmler, invented the gas van, a type of mobile gas chamber consisting of a van or truck with an air-tight cargo area capable of carrying a number of people. The exhaust pipe of the van could be set to exhaust into the cargo area, so that when the van was loaded with victims, and the cargo door closed and locked, all that was needed was to drive down a road for a time while the carbon monoxide in the exhaust gas killed the people in the van. Once this process was finished, the bodies were pulled out, and the van driven on to another location to kill another group of people.

In practice, however, it was more difficult to carry out van killings than the original theory had anticipated. Becker was assigned to solve the problems. He later testified that when, in December 1941, he was transferred to Rauff's command, Rauff explained to Becker that the plan was to gas people rather than shoot them, because the psychological burden of so many shootings could no longer be borne by the killers. Rauff told Becker that the gas vans and drivers had already arrived at the Einsatzgruppe locations or they were on their way. Rauff assigned Becker to investigate the gas van procedures used by the Einsatzgruppen. Specifically, Becker was to ensure the mass killings (Massentötungen) made in the gas vans were conducted efficiently. In the middle of December 1941, Becker drove to Riga to inspect the gas vans used by Einsatzgruppe A. On 4 or 5 January 1942, Becker, on the direction from Rauff, moved on to Einsatzgruppe D in the south, which was commanded by Otto Ohlendorf near Simferopol. It took Becker about three weeks to get there. Becker stayed with Einsatzgruppe D until the beginning of April 1942, when he returned to Einsatzgruppe A at Riga.

Becker worried however not only about the technology of the gas vans, but was also concerned about their camouflage as well as the physical and moral health of the SS troops carrying out the execution procedure. Thus he reported on 16 May 1942 from Kiev to Rauff:

I ordered the vans of Einsatzgruppe D to be camouflaged as house-trailers by putting one set of window shutters on each side of the small van and two on each side of the larger vans, such as one often sees on farm-houses in the country. The vans became so well-known, that not only the authorities, but also the civilian population called the van "death van", as soon as one of these vehicles appeared. It is my opinion, the van cannot be kept secret for any length of time, not even camouflaged.
... Because of the rough terrain and the indescribable road and highway conditions the caulkings and rivets loosen in the course of time. I was asked if in such cases the vans should be brought to Berlin for repair. Transportation to Berlin would be much too expensive and would demand too much fuel. In order to save those expenses I ordered them to have smaller leaks soldered and if that should no longer be possible, to notify Berlin immediately by radio, that Pol. Nr ............. is out of order. Besides that I ordered that during application of gas all the men were to be kept as far away from the vans as possible, so they should not suffer damage to their health by the gas which eventually would escape. I should like to take this opportunity to bring the following to your attention: several commands have had the unloading after the application of gas done by their own men. I brought to the attention of the commanders of those S.K. concerned the immense psychological injuries and damages to their health which that work can have for those men, even if not immediately, at least later on. The men complained to me about head-aches which appeared after each unloading. Nevertheless they don't want to change the orders, because they are afraid prisoners called for that work, could use an opportune moment to flee. To protect the men from these damages, I request orders be issued accordingly.

In this letter, Becker criticized also the incorrect execution of the gassings:

The application of gas usually is not undertaken correctly. In order to come to an end as fast as possible, the driver presses the accelerator to the fullest extent. By doing that the persons to be executed suffer death from suffocation and not death by dozing off as was planned. My directions now have proved that by correct adjustment of the levers death comes faster and the prisoners fall asleep peacefully. Distorted faces and excretions, such as could be seen before, are no longer noticed.

Becker continued sending messages to Rauff regarding the efficacious use of the gas vans through the middle of 1942. On 5 June 1942, Becker reported that "for an example, since December 1941, three vehicles were used to process 97,000, with no down-time on the vehicles." In September 1942, following his return to Berlin, Becker criticized the untidy means by which the murders were carried out to Rauff's deputy Pradel:

I described the function of the gas cars to Pradel in an hour long personal discussion and offered criticisms, because the subjects (people to be murdered) were suffocated and not gassed since the operating crew didn't follow proper instructions. I told him that the subjects vomited and defecated upon themselves prior to death instead of falling asleep first. Pradel thoughtfully nodded, without saying a word.

After his work as a gas van specialist Becker was employed at the Central Commercial Company East (Zentralhandelsgesellschaft Ost), a monopoly company for the agricultural products in the occupied east areas, and afterwards in the Foreign Defense Office (Auslandabwehr) of the Central Reich Security Office (RSHA). In 1943, he was promoted to Lieutenant Colonel (SS-Obersturmbannführer).

== Trial and conviction ==
Because of his membership in the SS, Becker was tried by a denazification tribunal. He was sentenced to three years in prison. Afterwards, he worked as a salesman and industrial worker. In 1959, he suffered a stroke and moved to a nursing home in the upper Hessian town of Laubach.

In 1959, the public prosecutor's office in Stuttgart began a preliminary investigation into offenses committed by Becker, Albert Widmann and Paul Werner. Becker was condemned to ten years prison, but on 15 July 1960, due to his bad state of health he was released from detention and admitted to the home for the elderly at Butzbach. When in 1967, the State Criminal Court in Stuttgart sent a summons to Becker, it turned out that Becker had been taken out of the Butzbach home on 3 January 1966 by persons unknown, and his current whereabouts could not be determined. On 16 June 1967, the Baden-Wuerttemberg state criminal police agency issued a bulletin to be on the look out for Becker. By then, however, Becker had been checked into another nursing home, where he remained in a state of almost complete mental and physical breakdown. August Becker died on 31 December 1967.
