= Pomßen =

Coordinates: 51°14′N 12°37′E

Pomßen is a village some 20 kilometres from Leipzig, Germany. Since 1994, it is part of the municipality of Parthenstein.

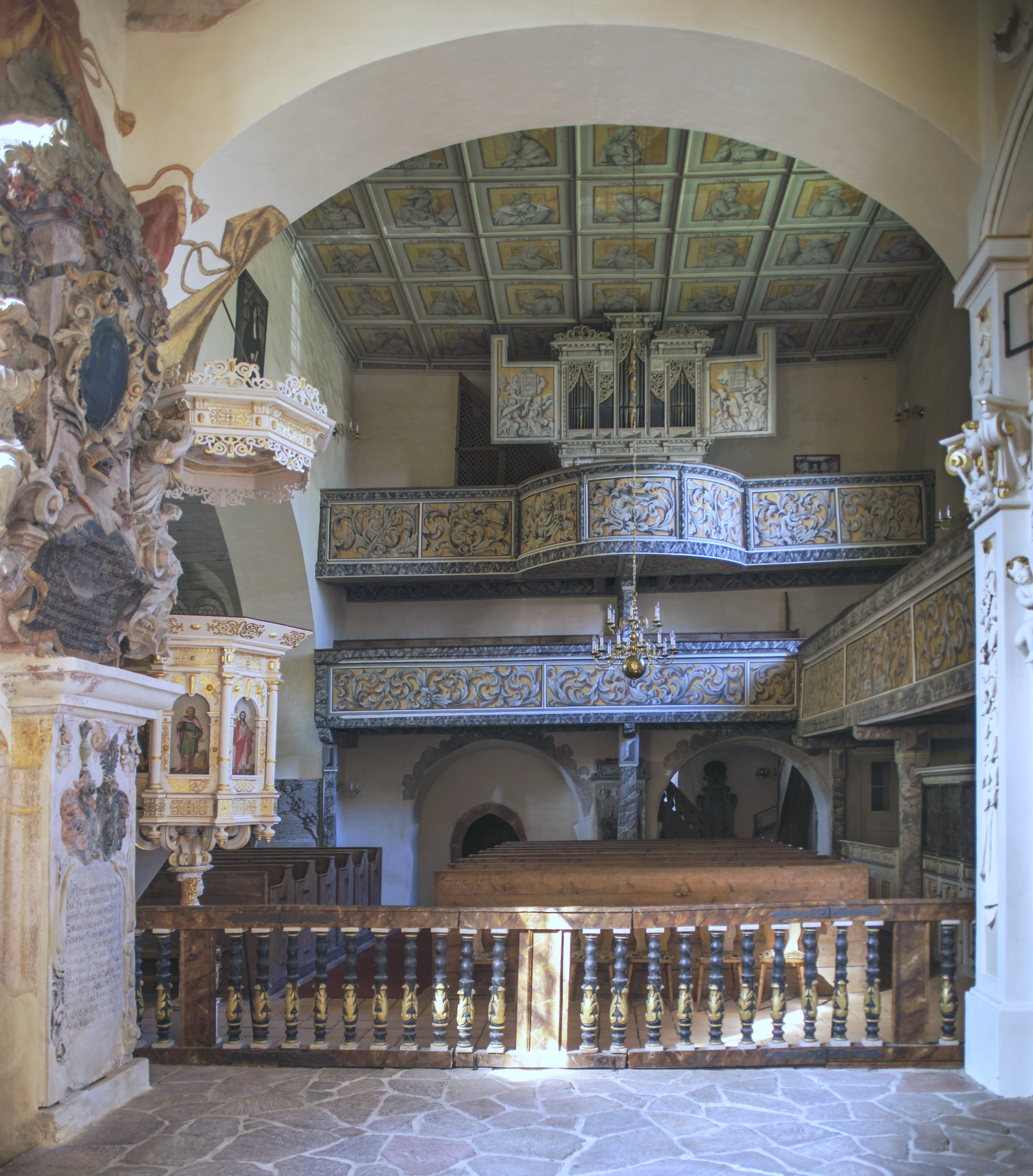
Interior of the church at Pomßen

There is a fortified church of architectural and historical interest. It has an organ built by Gottfried Richter (1643–1717) The church is also of interest to music historians for its association with J.S. Bach. His cantata Ich lasse dich nicht, du segnest mich denn, BWV 157 was performed there in 1727.

== Notable person ==
Gerhard Kretschmar
