= Karl Brandt =

German physician and Nazi criminal (1904–1948)

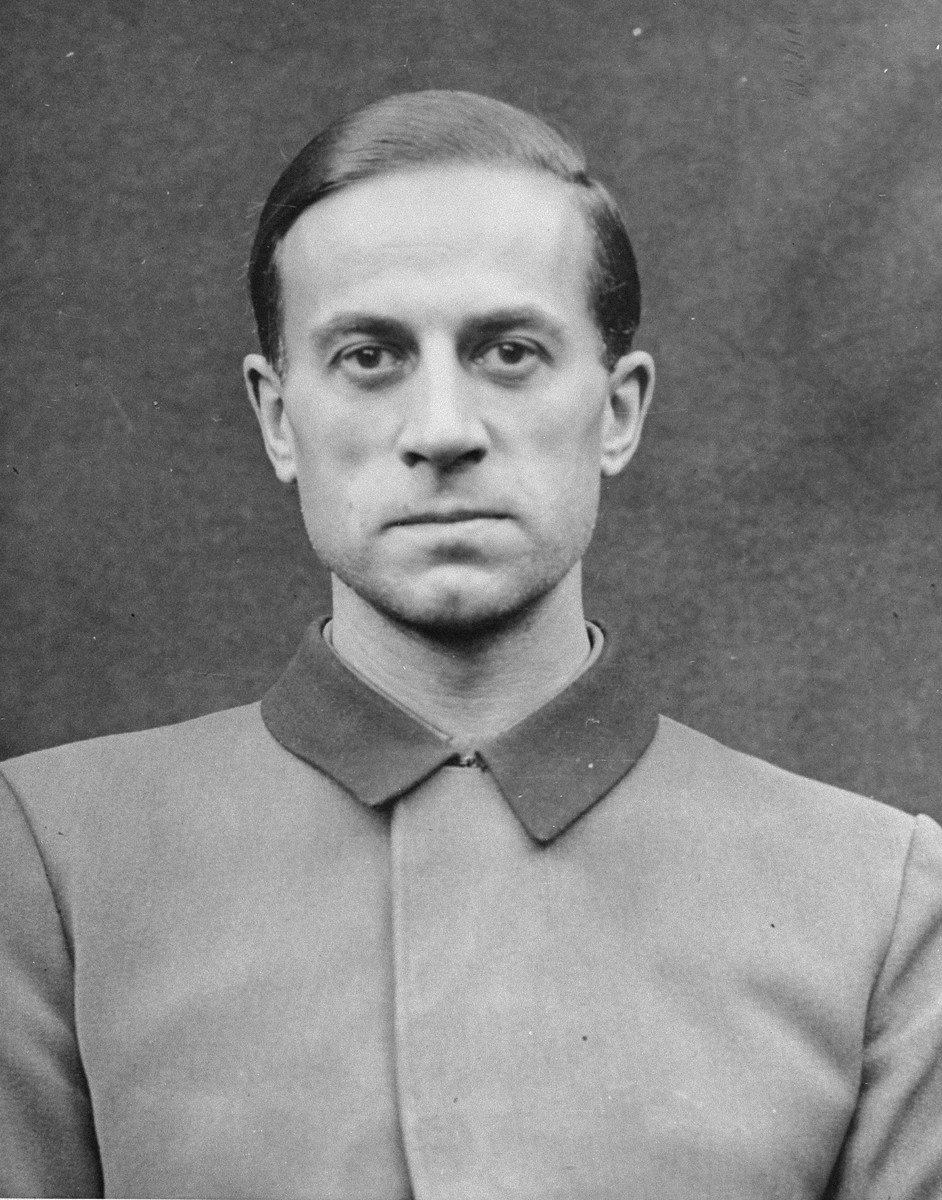
- Brandt as a defendant at the Doctors' Trial
- Born: 8 January 1904; Mülhausen, Alsace–Lorraine, German Empire
- Died: 2 June 1948 (aged 44); Landsberg Prison, Allied-occupied Germany
- Occupation: Personal physician of German dictator Adolf Hitler
- Known for: Reich Commissioner for Health and Emergency Services
- Title: SS-Gruppenführer in the Allgemeine SS / SS-Brigadeführer and Generalmajor of the Waffen-SS
- Political party: Nazi Party
- Spouse: Anni Rehborn (m. 1934)
- Children: 1
- Status: Executed by hanging
- Motive: Nazism
- Convictions: War crimes Crimes against humanity Membership in a criminal organization
- Trial: Doctors' Trial
- Penalty: Death

Karl Brandt (8 January 1904 – 2 June 1948) was a German physician and Schutzstaffel (SS) officer in Nazi Germany.

Trained in surgery, Brandt joined the Nazi Party in 1932 and became Adolf Hitler's "escort doctor" (Begleitarzt) in August 1934. A member of Hitler's inner circle at the Berghof, he was selected by Philipp Bouhler, the head of Hitler's Chancellery, to administer the Aktion T4 euthanasia program. Brandt was later appointed the Reich Commissioner of Health and Emergency Services (Bevollmächtigter für das Sanitäts- und Gesundheitswesen). Accused of involvement in human experimentation and other war crimes, Brandt was indicted in late 1946 and faced trial before a U.S. military tribunal along with 22 others in the Doctors' Trial. He was found guilty, sentenced to death, and executed on 2 June 1948.

== Early life ==
Brandt was born in Mülhausen, Alsace–Lorraine, Germany (now France) into the family of a Prussian Army officer. He became a medical doctor and surgeon in 1928, specializing in head and spinal injuries. He joined the Nazi Party in January 1932, and first met Hitler in the summer of 1932. He became a member of the SA in 1933 and a member of the SS on 29 July 1934; appointed the officer rank of Untersturmführer. From the summer of 1934 forward, he was Hitler's "escort physician". Karl Brandt married Anni Rehborn, a champion swimmer, on 17 March 1934. They had one child, Karl Adolf Brandt (born 4 October 1935). Brandt was of the Protestant faith.

== Career in Nazi Germany ==
In the context of the 1933 Nazi Germany law Gesetz zur Verhütung erbkranken Nachwuchses (Law for the Prevention of Hereditarily Diseased Offspring), Brandt was one of the medical scientists who performed abortions in great numbers on women deemed genetically disordered, mentally or physically disabled or racially deficient, or whose unborn fetuses were expected to develop such genetic "defects". These abortions had been legalized, as long as no healthy Aryan fetuses were aborted. On 25 July 1939, Brandt authorized the first euthanization of the Nazi eugenics program, that of Gerhard Kretschmar, a 5-month-old disabled German infant.

On 1 September 1939, Brandt was appointed by Hitler as co-head of the Aktion T4 euthanasia program, with Philipp Bouhler. Additional power was afforded Brandt when on 28 July 1942, he was appointed Commissioner of Health and Emergency Services (Bevollmächtigter für das Sanitäts- und Gesundheitswesen) by Hitler and was thereafter only bound by the Führer's instructions. He received regular promotions in the SS; by April 1944, Brandt was a SS-Gruppenführer in the Allgemeine SS and a SS-Brigadeführer in the Waffen-SS. On 16 April 1945, he was arrested by the Gestapo for moving his family out of Berlin so they could surrender to American forces. Brandt was condemned to death by a military court and then sent to Kiel. He was released from arrest by order of Karl Dönitz on 2 May. He was placed under arrest by the British on 23 May.

== Brandt's medical ethics ==
Brandt's medical ethics, particularly regarding euthanasia, were influenced by Alfred Hoche, whose courses he attended. Like many other German doctors of the period, Brandt came to believe that the health of society as a whole should take precedence over that of its individual members. Because society was viewed as an organism that had to be cured, its weakest, most invalid and incurable members were only parts that should be removed. Such hapless creatures should therefore be granted a "merciful death" (Gnadentod). In addition to these considerations, Brandt's explanation at his trial for his criminal actions – particularly ordering experimentation on human beings – was that "... Any personal code of ethics must give way to the total character of the war". Historian Horst Freyhofer asserts that, in the absence of at least Brandt's tacit approval, it is highly unlikely that the grotesque and cruel medical experiments for which the Nazi doctors are infamous, could have been performed. Brandt and Hitler discussed multiple killing techniques during the initial planning of the euthanasia program, during which Hitler asked Brandt, "which is the most humane way?". Brandt suggested the use of carbon monoxide gas, to which Hitler gave his approval. Hitler instructed Brandt to contact other physicians and begin to coordinate the mass killings.

== Life in the inner circle ==
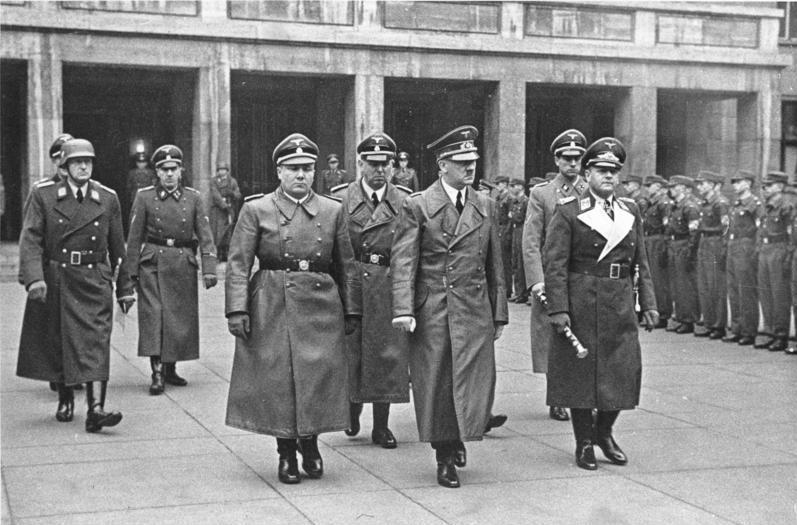
Brandt at right, following Hitler and Martin Bormann and walking behind Field Marshal Milch

Karl Brandt and his wife Anni were members of Hitler's inner circle at Berchtesgaden where Hitler maintained his private residence known as the Berghof. This very exclusive group functioned as Hitler's de facto family circle. It included Eva Braun, Albert Speer, his wife Margarete, Theodor Morell, Martin Bormann, Hitler's photographer Heinrich Hoffmann, Hitler's adjutants and his secretaries. Brandt and Hitler's chief architect Albert Speer were good friends as the two shared technocratic dispositions about their work. Brandt looked at killing "useless eaters" and the disabled as a means to an end, namely in the interest of public health. Similarly, Speer viewed the use of concentration camp slave labor for his defense and building projects in much the same way. As members of this inner circle, the Brandts had a residence near the Berghof and spent considerable time there when Hitler was present. Despite Brandt's closeness to Hitler, the dictator was furious when he learned shortly before the end of the war that the doctor had sent Anni and their son toward the American lines in hopes of evading capture by the Russians. Hitler charged him with treason and Brandt underwent a summary trial and was sentenced to death. Only the intervention of Heinrich Himmler and Speer saved him from execution at that time.

== Trial and execution ==
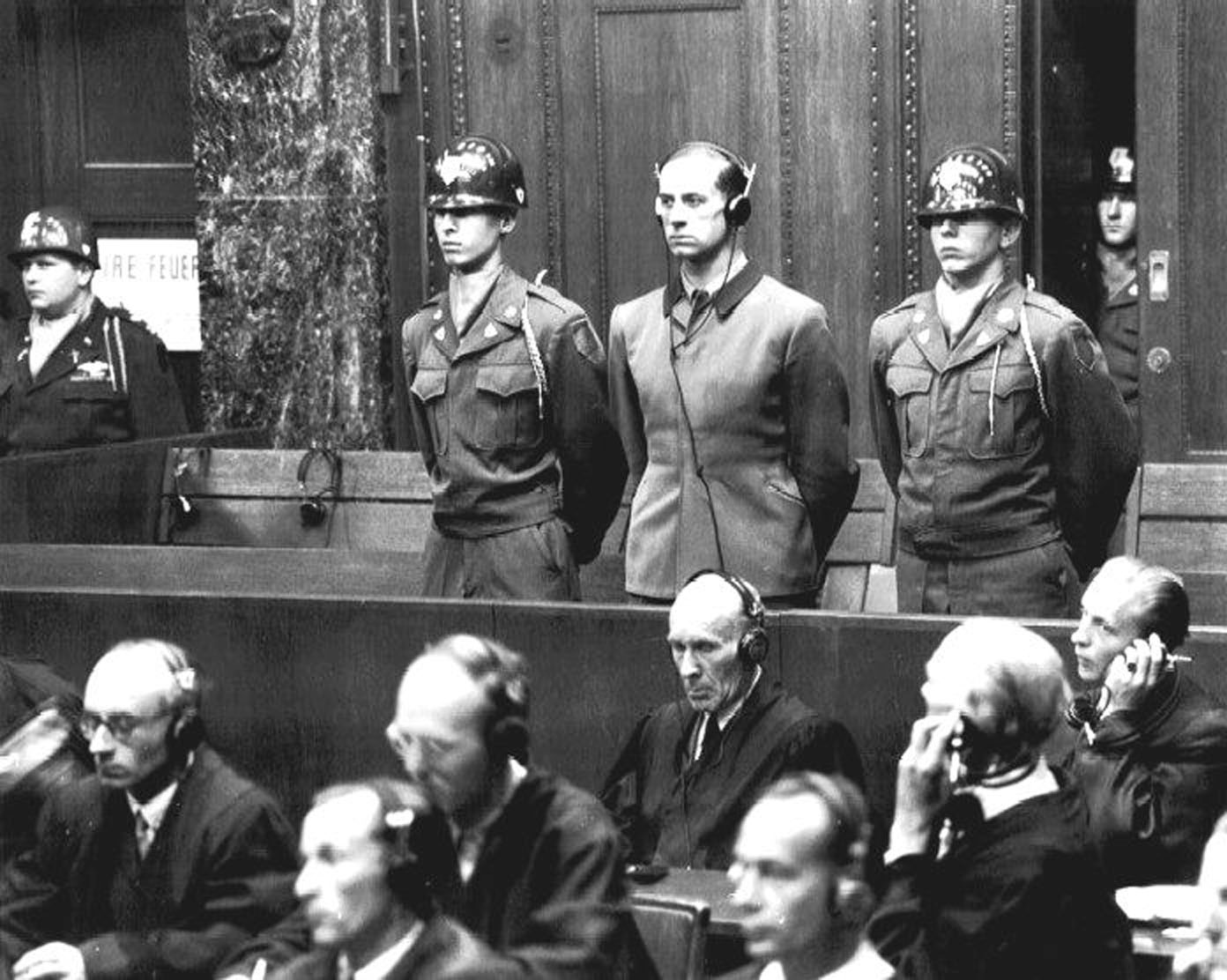
Brandt on trial, 20 August 1947

Brandt was tried along with twenty-two others at the Palace of Justice in Nuremberg, Germany. The trial was officially titled United States of America v. Karl Brandt et al., but is more commonly referred to as the "Doctors' Trial"; it began on 9 December 1946. He was charged with four counts:

1. Conspiracy to commit war crimes and crimes against humanity as described in counts 2 and 3;
2. War crimes: performing medical experiments, without the subjects' consent, on prisoners of war and civilians of occupied countries, in the course of which experiments the defendants committed murders, brutalities, cruelties, tortures, atrocities, and other inhuman acts. Also planning and performing the mass murder of prisoners of war and civilians of occupied countries, stigmatized as aged, insane, incurably ill, deformed, and so on, by gas, lethal injections, and diverse other means in nursing homes, hospitals, and asylums during the Euthanasia Program and participating in the mass murder of concentration camp inmates;
3. Crimes against humanity: committing crimes described under count 2 also on German nationals;
4. Membership in a criminal organization, the SS. The charges against him included special responsibility for, and participation in, Freezing, Malaria, LOST Gas, Sulfanilamide, Bone, Muscle and Nerve Regeneration and Bone Transplantation, Sea-Water, Epidemic Jaundice, Sterilization, and Typhus Experiments.

As chief of counsel for the prosecution Telford Taylor put it:

"The defendants in this case are charged with murders, tortures, and other atrocities committed in the name of medical science. The victims of these crimes are numbered in the hundreds of thousands. A handful only are still alive; a few of the survivors will appear in this courtroom. But most of these miserable victims were slaughtered outright or died in the course of the tortures to which they were subjected. For the most part they are nameless dead. To their murderers, these wretched people were not individuals at all. They came in wholesale lots and were treated worse than animals."

After a defence led by Robert Servatius, on 19 August 1947, Brandt was found guilty on counts 2-4 of the indictment. With six others, he was sentenced to death by hanging. Pleas for clemency on Brandt's behalf were made by dozens of people, including representatives of the churches, such as Eugen Gerstenmaier, the chairman of the relief organization of the Evangelical Church in Germany. Amongst Brandt's advocates were numerous medical health professionals, such as surgeon Ferdinand Sauerbruch, renowned pathologist Robert Roesle, pharmacologist Wolfgang Hübner, gynaecologist Walter Stoeckel, and historian of medicine Paul Diepgen. Other noted petitioners included various other physiologists, pathologists and surgeons. Ultimately, Lucius D. Clay, the governor of the American occupation zone in Germany, rejected all pleas for mercy. He confirmed the death sentence for Brandt, as well as those for his codefendants.

Clay stated:

Regardless of what inner convictions Dr Brandt may have held, he was directly responsible for much of the suffering and death caused to the unfortunate concentration camp victims chosen to be used as subjects in brutal medical experiments. In justice to these persons who underwent torture and death, I am unable to grant clemency in this case.

Brandt had previously boasted that he was "the one German the Americans will never hang." After being sentenced, he offered his body to be used for medical experiments. To his surprise, the request was rejected. Brandt and six other defendants were executed at Landsberg Prison on 2 June 1948. At the gallows, Brandt denounced his execution as hypocrisy.

"How can the nation which holds the lead in human experimentation in any conceivable form, how can that nation dare to accuse and punish other nations which only copied their experimental procedures? And even euthanasia! Only look at Germany, and the way her misery has been manipulated and artificially prolonged. It is, of course, not surprising that the nation which in the face of the history of humanity will forever have to bear the guilt for Hiroshima and Nagasaki, that this nation attempts to hide itself behind moral superlatives. She does not bend the law: Justice has never been here! Neither in the whole nor in the particular. What dictates is power. And this power wants victims. We are such victims. I am such a victim."

"It is no shame to stand upon this scaffold. This is nothing but political revenge. I have served my Fatherland as others before me."

As Brandt continued to talk, the executioner told him that he had run out of time and needed to end his speech. However, he refused to stop. After the executioners ran out of patience, the hood was placed over Brandt's head as he continued to talk and he was hanged.

== See also ==
- List SS-Gruppenführer
- Action 14f13
- Nazi human experimentation

== Bibliography ==
- Aly, Götz, Peter Chroust, and Christian Pross, eds. Cleansing the Fatherland: Nazi Medicine and Racial Hygiene. Baltimore: Johns Hopkins University Press, 1994.
- Burleigh, Michael, and Wolfgang Wippermann. The Racial State: Germany 1933-1945. Cambridge & New York: Cambridge University Press, 1991.
- Dawidowicz, Lucy S. The War Against the Jews: 1933-1945. New York: Bantam Books Inc., 1975.
- Ehrenreich, Eric. The Nazi Ancestral Proof: Genealogy, Racial Science, and the Final Solution. Bloomington: Indiana University Press, 2007.
- Freyhofer, Horst. Nuremberg Medical Trial. New York: Peter Lang Publishing, 2004.
- Friedlander, Henry. Origins of Nazi Genocide: From Euthanasia to the Final Solution. Chapel Hill: University of North Carolina Press, 1997.
- Fritz, Stephen G. Ostkrieg: Hitler's War of Extermination in the East. Lexington: The University Press of Kentucky, 2011.
- Hamilton, Charles (1984). Leaders & Personalities of the Third Reich, Vol. 1. R. James Bender Publishing. ISBN 0-912138-27-0.
- Hutton, Christopher. Race and the Third Reich: Linguistics, Racial Anthropology and Genetics in the Dialectic of Volk. Cambridge: Cambridge University Press, 2005.
- Joachimsthaler, Anton (1999) [1995]. The Last Days of Hitler: The Legends, the Evidence, the Truth. Trans. Helmut Bögler. London: Brockhampton Press. ISBN 978-1-86019-902-8.
- Koonz, Claudia. The Nazi Conscience. Cambridge, MA: Belknap Press of Harvard University Press, 2005.
- Lifton, Robert Jay. The Nazi Doctors: Medical Killing and the Psychology of Genocide. New York: Basic Books, 1986.
- Mayer, Arno. Why Did the Heavens Not Darken?: The "Final Solution" in History. London & New York: Verso Publishing, 2012.
- Proctor, Robert. Racial Hygiene: Medicine under the Nazis. Cambridge, MA: Harvard University Press, 1988.
- Schafft, Gretchen E. From Racism to Genocide: Anthropology in the Third Reich. Urbana and Chicago: University of Illinois Press, 2004.
- Schmidt, Ulf. Karl Brandt: The Nazi Doctor: Medicine and Power in the Third Reich. London, Hambledon Continuum, 2007.
- Skopp, Douglas R., Shadows Walking, A Novel (CreateSpace, Charleston, South Carolina, 2010) ISBN 1439231990
- Spitz, Vivien. Doctors from Hell: The Horrific Account of Nazi Experiments on Humans. Boulder, CO: Sentient Publications, 2005.
