= Philipp Bouhler =

German senior Nazi Party functionary (1899–1945)

- Bouhler in the 1930s, wearing the Blood Order

Reichsleiter
- In office 2 June 1933 – 23 April 1945

Chief of the Chancellery of the Führer of the NSDAP
- In office 17 November 1934 – 23 April 1945

Chief of NSDAP Censorship in the Reichsleitung
- In office October 1936 – 23 April 1945

Chief of Aktion T4
- In office 1 September 1939 – 24 August 1941

Nazi Party National Business Manager
- In office 27 March 1925 – 17 November 1934

Additional positions
- 1933–1945: Reichstag Deputy

Personal details
- Born: 11 September 1899 Munich, Bavaria, German Empire
- Died: 19 May 1945 (aged 45) Zell am See, Salzburg, Allied-occupied Austria
- Cause of death: Suicide by cyanide poisoning
- Party: Nazi Party (NSDAP)
- Other political affiliations: Greater German People's Community
- Spouse: Helene Majer (m. 1934; died 1945)
- Education: Philosophy

Military service
- Allegiance: German Empire
- Branch/service: Imperial German Army
- Years of service: 1912–1917
- Rank: Leutnant
- Unit: 1st Royal Bavarian Foot Artillery Regiment
- Battles/wars: World War I; Battle of Arras (WIA)
- Awards: Iron Cross, 2nd class

Philipp Bouhler (11 September 1899 – 19 May 1945) was a German senior Nazi Party functionary who was both a Reichsleiter (National Leader) and Chief of the Chancellery of the Führer of the NSDAP. He was also the SS official responsible for the Aktion T4 euthanasia program that killed more than 250,000 disabled adults and children in Nazi Germany, as well as co-initiator of Aktion 14f13, also called Sonderbehandlung ('special treatment'), that killed 15,000–20,000 concentration camp prisoners.

Bouhler was arrested on 10 May 1945 by American troops. He took his own life nine days later in the U.S. internment camp at Zell am See in Austria.

== Early life ==
Bouhler was born in Munich; his father was a retired colonel. He spent five years in the Royal Bavarian Cadet Corps. He entered the 1st Royal Bavarian Foot Artillery Regiment in 1916 during World War I, was commissioned as a Leutnant in July 1917, and was badly wounded the next month. He was awarded the Iron Cross, 2nd class, and was hospitalized through the end of the war.

After returning to civilian life in 1919, he joined the Deutschvölkischer Schutz- und Trutzbund, the largest and most active antisemitic organization in the new Weimar Republic, and he also enrolled at the Ludwig-Maximilians-Universität München (LMU) to study philosophy and literature. However, after four semesters, he left the university in 1920 and was employed by J.F. Lehmann's publishing house. The following year, he became a contributor to the Völkischer Beobachter, the Nazi Party's newspaper.

== Nazi functionary ==
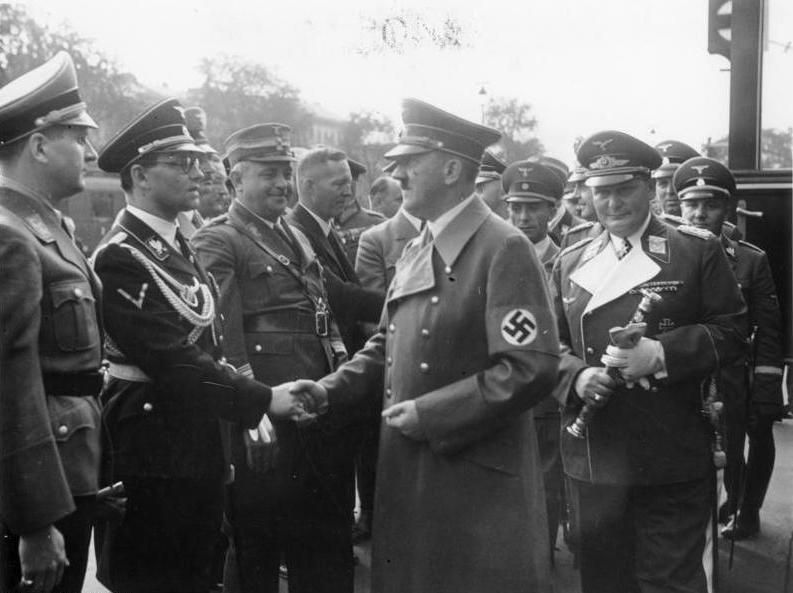
Bouhler with Adolf Hitler, Baldur von Schirach, Hermann Göring, Joseph Goebbels, and Martin Bormann; Munich, October 1938

Bouhler joined the Nazi Party (NSDAP) in July 1922 with membership number 12. By late 1922 he had become deputy business manager of the NSDAP under Max Amann. He took part in the failed Beer Hall Putsch in Munich and when the Party was banned, became the Business Manager for the Nazi front organization, the Greater German People's Community, based in Munich.

Upon the refounding of the party on 27 February 1925, he immediately rejoined and was made National Business Manager of the NSDAP, holding this post until November 1934. Historian Ian Kershaw avows that because Hitler paid "little attention to administration and organization", he relied on the "indefatigable and subservient" yet "inwardly ambitious" Bouhler and other Party bosses like him. According to historian Klaus Fischer, the "owlish looking" Bouhler was part of Adolf Hitler's early inner circle and as a "diffident and punctilious bureaucrat", the Führer could trust him to "carry out any order, no matter how outlandish".

After the seizure of power in January 1933, Bouhler was elected as a member of the Reichstag from the Nazi Party electoral list at the March 1933 parliamentary election. At the November election, he was returned as a deputy from electoral constituency 18, Westphalia South, and continued to hold this seat until the fall of the Nazi regime. In June 1933, Hitler appointed him a Reichsleiter, the second highest political rank in the Nazi Party. He joined the SS in the rank of SS-Gruppenführer on 20 April 1933 with membership number 54,932. On 30 January 1936, Bouhler was promoted to the rank of SS-Obergruppenführer.

From the end of August to the end of October 1934, Bouhler was police president of Munich. In September he was made a member of the Academy for German Law. He was next appointed chief of Adolf Hitler's Chancellery, a post specially created on 17 November 1934 that was first and foremost set aside for party business. He held that position until 23 April 1945. In this job, for instance, secret decrees might be prepared, or internal business managed, before being brought before Hitler. An example of such interactions occurred when Bouhler obtained Hitler's written authorization (a rare occurrence) for the expropriation of the villa that became the center of administrative operations for T4, an act veiled in the bureaucracy that characterized Hitler's leadership style. (Note: Bouhler took control over the Aktion T4 initiative from Dr. Leonardo Conti, who Hitler originally asked to head the program. Dr. Conti had contended that he saw no scientific evidence to suggest this euthanasia program could positively offer any "eugenic advantages" for the purity of the German race.) Meanwhile, Bouhler was also able to get Hitler to sign the document authorizing the euthanasia program itself and while not possessing the force of law, it provided the necessary protection to get once reluctant physicians to participate. (Note: It was at the holiday resort town of Zoppot that Hitler issued this order.) Printed on white stationery bearing the German eagle and swastika with Hitler's name embossed, (Note: German historian Peter Longerich clarifies that this was Hitler's "personal writing paper". Recent biographer of Hitler, Volker Ullrich, called this stationery "Hitler's personal letterhead".) it read:

Reich Leader Bouhler and Dr. med. Brandt are charged with the responsibility of enlarging the competence of certain physicians, designated by name, so that patients who, on the basis of human judgment, are considered incurable, can be granted mercy death after a discerning diagnosis. (signed) A. Hitler

The euthanasia program's first victims were children registered with conditions like "Down's syndrome, micro- and hydrocephaly, serious physical deformities... and cerebral palsy"; these children were examined by three decision makers (Werner Catel, Hans Heinze, and Ernst Wentzler), who after conferral and agreement, (Note: That agreement was reached by simply checking a "plus or minus sign to indicate whether the particular child was to die or be allowed to live." According to historian Doris Bergen, the participating doctors "never saw the children whose fates they decided.") put the child to death. For adults destined for euthanasia, Bouhler and Brandt established "secret-service-style" operations at the Tiergartenstrasse 4 (from whence the program acquired its name) location in Berlin, disguising the murders as medical procedures.

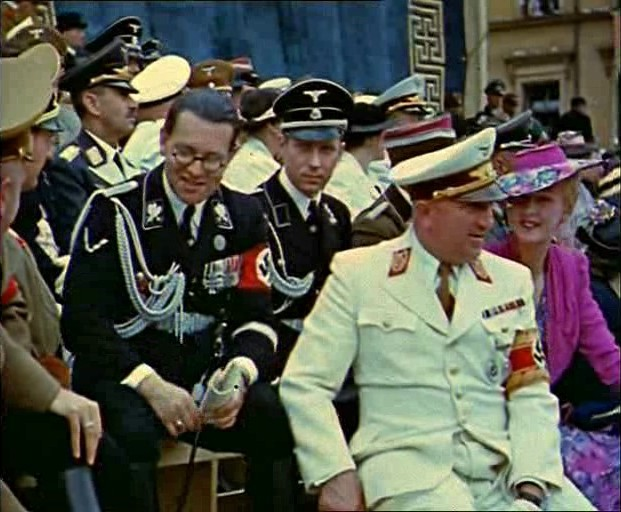
(from left) Bouhler, Karl Freiherr Michel von Tüßling, Robert Ley with his wife Inge; Munich, July 1939

Aside from securing the authorization for the T4 Program and overseeing it, when the plans to ship all of Europe's Jewish population to Madagascar was being proposed during the summer of 1940, Bouhler was designated as the East African colony's future governor. (Note: Bouhler was also asked by Brack—via an inquiry from Himmler—to check with the array of doctors and scientists working in the euthanasia program if it was feasible to sterilize the Jews en masse using X-rays.)

Bouhler was also Vorsitzender der Parteiamtlichen Prüfungskommission zum Schutze des NS-Schrifttums ("Chairman of the Official Party Inspection Commission for the Protection of National Socialist Literature"), which determined what writings were and were not suitable for Nazi society. Propaganda minister Joseph Goebbels was opposed to this writ-large authority granted to Bouhler over all books, a concern he expressed in a personal diary entry from June 1941.

Bouhler's office was responsible for Hitler's correspondence, which included private and internal communications as well as responding to public inquiries (for example, requests for material help, godfathership, jobs, clemency, NSDAP business, and birthday wishes). These types of responsibility and his direct access to Hitler made Bouhler one of the "major players in Hitler's propaganda system". Bouhler's personal adjutant was SS-Sturmbannführer Karl Freiherr Michel von Tüßling. By 1944, many of the Kanzlei des Führers office functions were absorbed by the Party Chancellery (Parteikanzlei) under Martin Bormann, who tried his best to limit all access to Hitler by other party leaders.

=== Authored work ===
Bouhler wrote several books published by the Nazi regime. In 1938, he produced Kampf um Deutschland ("Fight for Germany"), a history of the Nazi movement. In 1942, he produced Napoleon – Kometenbahn eines Genies ("Napoleon – A Genius's Cometary Path"), which became a favorite of Hitler's. (Note: During the war, Bouhler published Der großdeutsche Freiheitskampf ("the greater German freedom struggle"), an edited three volume series featuring the speeches given by Hitler from 1 September 1939 to 15 March 1942. See for instance: Der grossdeutsche Freiheitskampf - Reden Adolf Hitlers vom 01.09.1939 bis 10.03.1940; Der Grossdeutsche Freiheitskampf - Reden Adolf Hitlers - Band 2; Der grossdeutsche Freiheitskampf (1943))

== War crimes ==
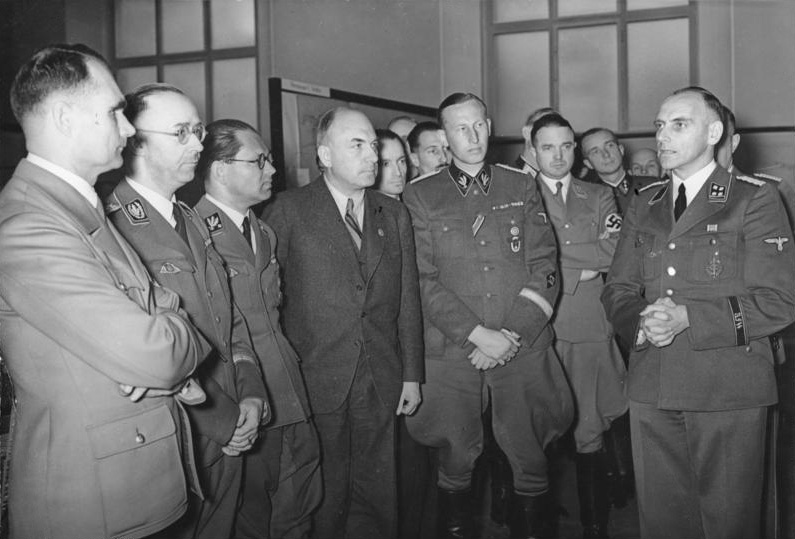
Rudolf Hess, Heinrich Himmler, Bouhler, Fritz Todt and Reinhard Heydrich (from left), listening to Konrad Meyer at a Generalplan Ost exhibition, 20 March 1941

Bouhler was responsible for the killing of disabled German citizens. By order of Hitler (backdated to 1 September 1939), Bouhler and Karl Brandt developed the Nazis' early euthanasia program, Aktion T4 in which mentally ill, developmentally, and physically disabled people were killed. (Note: View the following website for more information: "The 'euthanasia" crime in Hadamar" Archived 12 June 2011 at the Wayback Machine University of Minnesota, Center for Holocaust and Genocide Studies. Retrieved 17 May 2010.) The actual implementation was supervised by Bouhler. Various methods of killing were tried out. The first killing facility was Schloss Hartheim in Upper Austria. Additional euthanasia facilities were established at Bernburg, Grafeneck, Brandenburg, Sonnenstein, and Hadamar between 1940 and 1941, where approximately 70,000 people were murdered in gas chambers using carbon-monoxide. (Note: Once the victims were murdered, their gold teeth were extracted and the bodies cremated.) The knowledge gained from the euthanasia program was later applied to the industrialized annihilation of other groups of people, especially the Jews.

In 1941, Bouhler and Heinrich Himmler initiated Aktion 14f13. They instructed the head of the Hauptamt II ("main office ll") of Hitler's Chancellery, the Oberdienstleiter Viktor Brack to implement this order. Brack was already in charge of various front operations for the T4 program. The scheme operated under the Concentration Camps Inspector and the Reichsführer-SS under the name "Special Treatment 14f13". (Note: Sonderbehandlung ("special treatment") was the euphemistic term for execution or killing.) The combination of numbers and letters was derived from the SS record-keeping system and consists of the number "14" for the Concentration Camps Inspector, the letter "f" for the German word "deaths" (Todesfälle), and the number "13" for the means of killing, in this case, for gassing in the T4 killing centers. (Note: Historian Henry Friedlander writes that "14f included all files involving the death of prisoners. Thus, for example, 14f7 files concerned death through natural causes, 14f8 applied to suicides, and 14f14 involved executions".)

After the war, Brack claimed that in order to keep the euthanasia program personnel employed after it was halted, Bouhler—in conference with Himmler—ordered him "to send the personnel to Lublin...under the supervision of SS-Brigadeführer Globocnik"; (Note: Historian Michael Burleigh wrote that some "ninety-two T4 personnel were made available by Bouhler" to Globocnik.) thereafter, the use of gas chambers for the "specially constructed" Reinhard extermination camps began. During the Nuremberg trials, Brack denied that both his and Bouhler's involvement through the KdF—despite the fact that the two of them visited Globocnik in Lublin—had anything to do with the Final Solution.

== Capture and suicide ==
Bouhler and his wife, Helene, were arrested by American troops at Schloss Fischhorn in Bruck near Zell-am-See on 10 May 1945. Helene jumped to her death from a window at Schloss Fischhorn. On 19 May, Bouhler committed suicide using a cyanide capsule while in the US internment camp at Zell-am-See. The couple had no children.

== Awards and Nazi Party decorations ==
- Iron Cross 2nd Class (Eisernes Kreuz 2. Klasse) 1914
- Wound Badge (World War I) in Black
- Blood Order
- War Merit Cross 2nd and 1st Class
- Honour Chevron for the Old Guard

== See also ==
- Action Reinhard

== Bibliography ==
- Bergen, Doris (2009). War & Genocide: A Concise History of the Holocaust (Second, revised ed.). Lanham, MD: Rowman & Littlefield. ISBN 978-0-7425-5715-4.
- Black, Jeremy (2016). The Holocaust: History and Memory. Bloomington; Indianapolis: Indiana University Press. ISBN 978-0-25302-214-1.
- Browning, Christopher R. (2004). The Origins of the Final Solution: The Evolution of Nazi Jewish Policy, September 1939 – March 1942. Lincoln: University of Nebraska Press. ISBN 0-8032-1327-1.
- Burleigh, Michael (1997). Ethics and Extermination: Reflections on Nazi Genocide. Cambridge; New York: Cambridge University Press. ISBN 978-0-52158-816-4.
- Bytwerk, Randall L. (2004). Bending Spines: The Propagandas of Nazi Germany and the German Democratic Republic. East Lansing, MI: Michigan State University Press. ISBN 978-0870137105.
- Cesarani, David (2016). Final Solution: The Fate of the Jews, 1933–1945. New York: St. Martin’s. ISBN 978-1-25000-083-5.
- Fischer, Klaus (1995). Nazi Germany: A New History. New York: Continuum. ISBN 978-0-82640-797-9.
- Friedlander, Henry (1994). "Euthanasia and the Final Solution". In David Cesarani (ed.). The Final Solution: Origins and Implementation. London and New York: Routledge. ISBN 978-0-41515-232-7.
- Friedlander, Henry (1995). The Origins of Nazi Genocide: From Euthanasia to the Final Solution. Chapel Hill: University of North Carolina Press. ISBN 978-0-80782-208-1.
- Friedländer, Saul (2009). Nazi Germany and the Jews, 1933–1945. New York: Harper Perennial. ISBN 978-0-06135-027-6.
- Gilbert, Martin (2014) [1989]. The Second World War: A Complete History. New York: Rosetta Books, LLC. ISBN 978-0-79533-729-1.
- Heberer, Patricia (2011). "The Nazi "Euthanasia" Program". In Jonathan C. Friedman (ed.). The Routledge History of the Holocaust. New York: Routledge. ISBN 978-0-41577-956-2.
- Heinemann, Isabel (2018). "Race". In Shelley Baranowski; Armin Nolzen; Claus‐Christian W. Szejnmann (eds.). A Companion to Nazi Germany. Hoboken, NJ; West Sussex: Wiley-Blackwell. ISBN 978-1-11893-688-7.
- Hilberg, Raul (1985). The Destruction of the European Jews. New York: Holmes & Meier. ISBN 0-8419-0910-5.
- Kershaw, Ian (1999). Hitler: 1889–1936, Hubris. New York: W. W. Norton & Company. ISBN 978-0-39304-671-7.
- Klee, Ernst (2016). Personenlexikon zum Dritten Reich: Wer war was vor und nach 1945 (in German). Hamburg: Nikol Verlag. ISBN 978-3-86820-311-0.
- Longerich, Peter (2019). Hitler: A Biography. Oxford and New York: Oxford University Press. ISBN 978-0-19005-673-5.
- Miller, Michael (2006). Leaders of the SS and German Police, Vol. 1. San Jose, CA: R. James Bender. ISBN 978-93-297-0037-2.
- Orlow, Dietrich (2010). The Nazi Party 1919–1945: A Complete History. New York: Enigma Books. ISBN 978-1-92963-157-5.
- Stone, Dan (2023). The Holocaust: An Unfinished History. New York and Boston: Mariner Books. ISBN 978-0-06334-903-2.
- Ullrich, Volker (2020). Hitler: Downfall, 1939–1945. New York: Knopf. ISBN 978-1-10187-400-4.
- USHMM. "Nazi Party organizes; "Voelkischer Beobachter" office; newspapers; leading officials". United States Holocaust Memorial Museum—Holocaust Encyclopedia.
- Weale, Adrian (2012). Army of Evil: A History of the SS. New York: Caliber Printing. ISBN 978-0451237910.
- Williams, Max (2015). SS Elite: The Senior Leaders of Hitler's Praetorian Guard. Vol. I. Fonthill Media LLC. ISBN 978-1-78155-433-3.
- Wistrich, Robert (1995). Who's Who In Nazi Germany. New York: Routledge. ISBN 978-0-41511-888-0.
- Yahil, Leni (1990). The Holocaust: The Fate of European Jewry, 1932–1945. Oxford and New York: Oxford University Press. ISBN 0-19-504522-X.
- Zentner, Christian; Bedürftig, Friedemann (1991). The Encyclopedia of the Third Reich. (2 vols.) New York: MacMillan Publishing. ISBN 0-02-897500-6.
