= Hitler's Chancellery =

Nazi Party organization

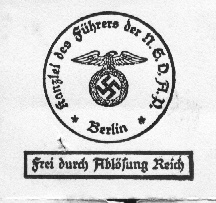
Chancellery seal

Hitler's Chancellery, officially known as the Kanzlei des Führers der NSDAP ("Chancellery of the Führer of the Nazi Party"; abbreviated as KdF) (Note: Not to be confused with the Nazi leisure organization known as Strength Through Joy (Kraft durch Freude), which is also abbreviated KdF.) was a Nazi Party organization. Also known as the Privatkanzlei des Führers ("Private Chancellery of the Führer") (Note: Some historians, such as Christopher Browning have also referred to this office as the Führer's Chancellery the Party Chancellery or Hitler's Chancellery in the same book, which can create additional confusion.) the agency served as the private chancellery of Adolf Hitler, handling different issues pertaining to matters such as complaints against party officials, appeals from party courts, official judgments, clemency petitions by NSDAP fellows and Hitler's personal affairs. The Chancellery of the Führer was also a key player in the Nazi euthanasia program.

== Organization ==
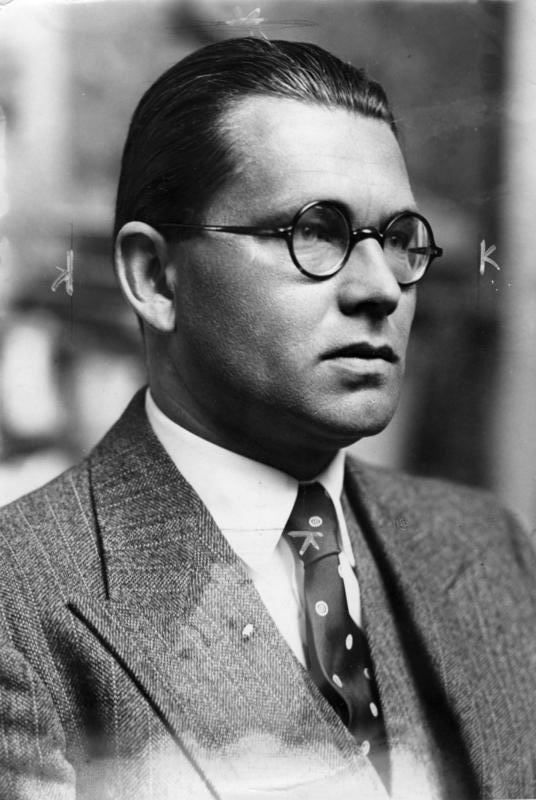
Philipp Bouhler, chief of the KdF and Action T4 programme

The chancellery was established in November 1934 in Berlin as a separate agency, which was parallel to the German Reich Chancellery under Hans Heinrich Lammers and the Nazi Party Chancellery (until 1941: "Staff of the Deputy Führer"), led by Martin Bormann. The Kanzlei des Führers was headed by SS-Obergruppenführer Philipp Bouhler, who bore the title of Chef der Kanzlei des Führers der NSDAP. His adjutant was SS-Sturmbannführer Karl Freiherr Michel von Tüßling. Originally the KdF operated out of their Berlin office at Lützow Ufer.

As chief of the KdF, Bouhler also held the rank of a Nazi Reichsleiter. He was appointed as chief on 17 November 1934 and held that position until 23 April 1945. Hitler selected Bouhler for this role due to his intense loyalty and deferential nature. Bouhler was also known for his tenacious efficiency and ideological fanaticism. In 1939, the KdF moved its seat close to the New Reich Chancellery building at Voßstraße No. 8. At this time, the KdF had twenty-six employees, which increased "five-fold by 1942." Practically speaking, the KdF or "Chancellery of the Führer of the NSDAP" as Hitler biographer Ian Kershaw terms it, was originally designed to deal with correspondence between the Führer and Party officials, and so he could stay "in direct touch with the concerns of the people." Much of the correspondence that came to the KdF consisted of "trivial complaints, petty grievances, and minor personal squabbles of Party members." Bouhler's KdF worked in-tandem with the offices of Propaganda Minister Joseph Goebbels to "check Nazi Party publications for their ideological correctness."

The KdF consisted of the following five main offices (Hauptämter), all subordinated directly to Hitler:

- Hauptamt I: Privatkanzlei (Personal Affairs of the Führer); chief: Albert Bormann.
- Hauptamt II: Angelegenheiten betr. Staat und Partei (State and Party Affairs); chief: Viktor Brack.
  - IIa: Stellvertretender Leiter des Hauptamtes II (Deputy chief Hauptamt II); head of section: Werner Blankenburg
- Hauptamt III: Gnadenamt für Parteiangelegenheiten (Pardon Office for Party Affairs); chief: Hubert Berkenkamp; later from 1941 forward: Kurt Giese.
- Hauptamt IV: Sozial- und Wirtschaftsangelegenheiten (Social and Economic Affairs); chief: Heinrich Cnyrim.
- Hauptamt V: Internes und Personal (Internal Affairs and Personnel Matters); chief: Herbert Jaensch.

After 1941, Bouhler's influence and that of the KdF declined and he was largely disempowered by Martin Bormann. Eventually the KdF was absorbed into the Reich Chancellery headed by Lammers during the war.

== Action T4 ==
Hauptamt II officials under Viktor Brack played a vital role in organizing the killing of mentally ill and physically handicapped people in the Action T4 "euthanasia" programme, especially the child "euthanasia" from 1939. By a (backdated) decree of 1 September, Hitler appointed his personal physician, Karl Brandt, along with Bouhler to manage the euthanasia program, where they would oversee the murder of physically and/or mentally disabled persons. The implementation of the killing operations were left to subordinates such as Brack and SA-Oberführer Werner Blankenburg. Besides Hitler's Chancellery, only a handful of personnel were privy to the inner workings of the euthanasia program so as to maintain secrecy, which is part of the reason Hitler chose Bouhler, as he knew the KdF "could direct the killings without involving too many people and without becoming too visible." To facilitate the program, Bouhler assembled a select team of 15 to 20 physicians, where he announced the "euthanasia" programme, justifying its implementation with "the need to free up hospital space and nurses for the coming war."

In accordance with the Chancellery-directed plan, physicians were required to report any newborn with abnormalities or congenital defects to the local health department; doctors were likewise required to register children under three-years of age suffering from any such conditions. During the killing phase related to euthanizing children, the KdF chose the cover title, Reich Committee for the Scientific Registration of Severe Hereditary Ailments, which only actually existed on paper; code names were also employed by members of the KdF for matters dealing with euthanasia. To provide some additional semblance of legitimacy to the operation, three doctors or "certifiers" also had to concur over any diagnosis before a "merciful death" could be administered, which included the final signature of a psychiatrist—all of which really boiled down to the economic considerations regarding the person's ability to work. To execute the deportations, the Gemeinnützige Krankentransport GmbH camouflage organization was established, residing on Tiergartenstraße No. 4. Just like earlier euthanasia operations, secrecy was again paramount, as Hitler explicitly told Bouhler concerning Aktion T4, "the Führer's Chancellery must under no circumstances be seen to be active in this matter." Many KdF employees who participated in T4 later joined Operation Reinhard, the Nazi plan under Odilo Globocnik to exterminate Polish Jews in the General Government district of German-occupied Poland during World War II.

== Bibliography ==
- Browning, Christopher R. (2004). The Origins of the Final Solution: The Evolution of Nazi Jewish Policy, September 1939 – March 1942. Lincoln: University of Nebraska Press. ISBN 0-8032-1327-1.
- Childers, Thomas (2017). The Third Reich: A History of Nazi Germany. New York: Simon & Schuster. ISBN 978-1-45165-113-3.
- Evans, Richard (2006). The Third Reich in Power. New York: Penguin. ISBN 978-0-14303-790-3.
- Fleming, Gerald (1994). Hitler and the Final Solution. Berkeley and Los Angeles: University of California Press. ISBN 0-520-06022-9.
- Friedlander, Henry (1997). The Origins of Nazi Genocide: From Euthanasia to the Final Solution. Chapel Hill: University of North Carolina Press. ISBN 978-0-8078-4675-9.
- Hamilton, Charles (1984). Leaders & Personalities of the Third Reich, Vol. 1. R. James Bender Publishing. ISBN 0-912138-27-0.
- Hilberg, Raul (1985). The Destruction of the European Jews. New York: Holmes & Meier. ISBN 0-8419-0910-5.
- Kershaw, Ian (2001). Hitler: 1936–1945, Nemesis. New York: W. W. Norton & Company. ISBN 978-0-39332-252-1.
- Longerich, Peter (2019). Hitler: A Biography. Oxford and New York: Oxford University Press. ISBN 978-0-19005-673-5.
- McNab, Chris (2009). The Third Reich. Amber Books. ISBN 978-1-906626-51-8.
- Merker, Paul (1972). Deutschland-Sein oder Nicht-sein?. Vol. 2. Frankfurt am Main: Materialismus Verlag. OCLC 873886991.
- Miller, Michael (2006). Leaders of the SS and German Police, Vol. 1. R. James Bender Publishing. ISBN 978-9-3297-0037-2.
- Proctor, Robert (1988). Racial Hygiene: Medicine under the Nazis. Cambridge, Massachusetts: Harvard University Press. ISBN 978-0674745780.
- Röder, Thomas; Kubillus, Volker; Burwell, Anthony (1995). Psychiatrists–The Men Behind Hitler: The Architects of Horror. Los Angeles: Freedom Publishing. ISBN 978-0-9648909-1-6.
- Schafft, Gretchen E. (2004). From Racism to Genocide: Anthropology in the Third Reich. Urbana and Chicago: University of Illinois Press. ISBN 978-0-25207-453-0.
- Stackelberg, Roderick (2007). The Routledge Companion to Nazi Germany. New York: Routledge. ISBN 978-0-41530-861-8.
- Zentner, Christian; Bedürftig, Friedemann (1991). The Encyclopedia of the Third Reich. New York: MacMillan Publishing. ISBN 0-02-897500-6.
