= Memorandum Authorizing Involuntary Euthanasia =

Adolf Hitler signed a memorandum authorizing involuntary euthanasia in October 1939 to serve as the legal basis for Aktion T4, the Nazi involuntary euthanasia program. Its purpose was to assure the doctors and nurses who took part in the 'euthanasia' program would not be prosecuted for murder. During the postwar trials of these same individuals, they attempted to use this decree as a justification for their actions. An estimated 200,000 people were murdered under Aktion T4.

== Background ==
In July 1939 Hitler gave Karl Brandt and Philipp Bouhler the task of organizing the adult euthanasia program. (The children's 'euthanasia' program had already begun in 1938.) In late July and August 1939, and Brandt and Bouhler assembled a group of doctors, all of whom were staunch advocates of euthanasia, to attend a series of meetings in Berlin that would help them plan and execute the adult euthanasia program. Bouhler told them that 'euthanizing' the mentally disabled would create hospital space for the impending war and free up doctors to care for the wounded. He also told them that Hitler had not published a euthanasia law because it would be used as propaganda against Germany but reassured them that they would not be prosecuted for their participation. However, there were still concerns about the legality of the program, as under German law illegally killing a human being was a capital offense. At a meeting about the euthanasia program in September 1939, Hans Heinrich Lammers, head of the Reich Chancellery (German: Reichskanzlei) and Hitler's legal advisor, pushed for the euthanasia program to have a solid legal basis. According to Lammers, Hitler gave him the task of drafting a euthanasia law, but Hitler decided not to promulgate the law because he was afraid that it would cause an uproar.

Since there would be no law formally authorizing the program, doctors, nurses, and public health officials were afraid of criminal liability if they participated in it. To assuage their fears, Hitler's Chancellery (German: Kanzlei des Führers or KdF) asked Hitler to authorize the 'euthanasia' program in writing. He agreed, and the KdF prepared a written statement on his own stationery. He signed it in October 1939 but backdated it to September 1, 1939.

== The memorandum itself ==
Reichsleiter [Philipp] Bouhler and Dr. med. [Karl] Brandt are hereby instructed and authorized to broaden the powers of designated physicians to the extent that persons who are suffering from diseases which may be deemed incurable according to standards of human judgment based on a careful examination of their condition shall be guaranteed a mercy death.
— Adolf Hitler, Memorandum Authorizing Involuntary Euthanasia, Berlin, 1 September 1939

== Use in postwar trials ==
When those who had participated in the 'euthanasia' program were tried and charged with murder following the end of the war in 1945, they appealed to this decree, arguing that it gave their actions a legal basis. However, while American military tribunals accepted the decree as a legal basis for euthanasia, no West German court accepted the degree as a valid law.

=== Hadamar trial ===
In the U.S. Hadamar trial of October 1945, the Americans prosecuted seven defendants who had worked at the Hadamar Killing Facility. However, they did not charge them with murdering the mentally disabled but rather with killing Polish and Russian workers who were sick with tuberculosis. The Americans presumed that the euthanasia program had a legal basis in German law (the "Memorandum Authorizing Involuntary Euthanasia"), meaning that for the Americans, prosecuting the staff at Hadamar for killing the mentally disabled would infringe on the sovereignty of Nazi Germany. In their trials of German war criminals and perpetrators of atrocities, the Americans were concerned above all to maintain U.S. sovereignty by not setting a precedent for one nation to interfere in the domestic affairs of another.
