= Aktion T4 =

Nazi mass-murder of the sick and disabled

Coordinates: 52°30′38″N 13°22′8″E

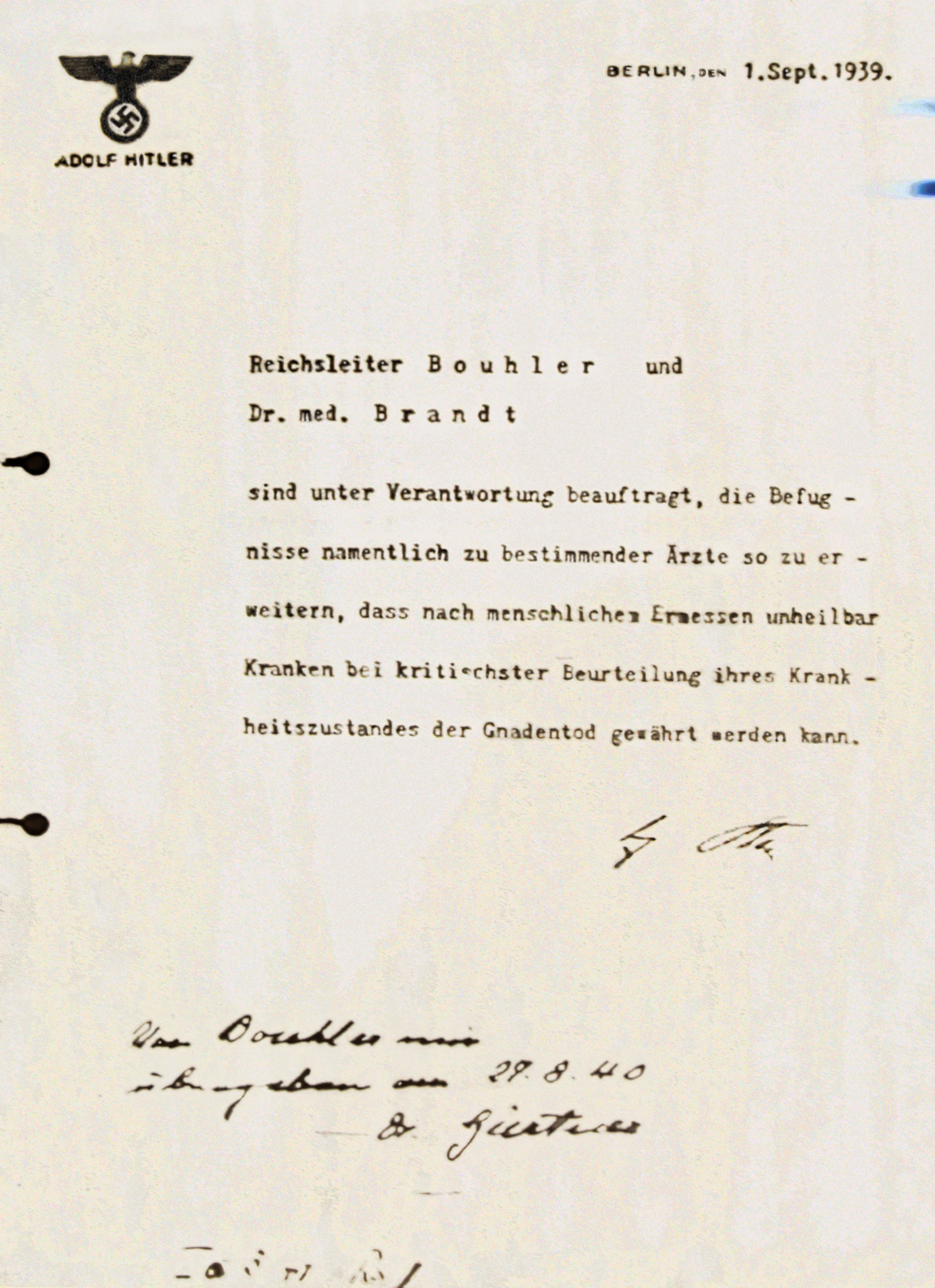
- Hitler's 1939 order authorising Philipp Bouhler and Karl Brandt to allow doctors to grant "mercy death" to "incurable" patients
- Also known as: T4 Programme
- Location: Nazi Germany and German-occupied Europe
- Date: September 1939 – 1945
- Incident type: Forced euthanasia
- Perpetrators: SS
- Participants: Psychiatric hospitals, T4-Gutachter
- Victims: 275,000–300,000 (Note: As many as 100,000 people may have been killed directly as part of Aktion T4. Mass euthanasia killings were also carried out in the Central and Eastern European countries and territories occupied by Nazi Germany during the war (see Nazi war crimes). Categories are fluid and no definitive figure can be assigned but historians put the total number of victims at around 300,000.)

Aktion T4 (German, pronounced [akˈtsi̯oːn teː fiːɐ]) was a Nazi-era programme for the systematic mass-murder of people with disabilities and the mentally ill using poison gas, lethal injections, starvation, and other means. The terms "T4" or "Aktion T4" were first used in post-war trials against the perpetrators.

The name T4 is an abbreviation of Tiergartenstraße 4, a street address of the Chancellery department set up in early 1940, in the Berlin borough of Tiergarten, which recruited and paid personnel associated with Aktion T4. (Note: Tiergartenstraße 4 was the location of the Central Office and administrative headquarters of the Gemeinnützige Stiftung für Heil- und Anstalts- pflege (Charitable Foundation for Curative and Institutional Care).) Certain German physicians were authorised to select patients "deemed incurably sick, after most critical medical examination" and then administer to them a "mercy death" (Gnadentod). In October 1939, Adolf Hitler signed a "euthanasia note", backdated to 1 September 1939, which authorised his physician Karl Brandt and Reichsleiter Philipp Bouhler to begin the killing.

Although the T4 programme officially ended in August 1941, killings took place from September 1939 until the end of World War II in Europe in 1945. Between 275,000 and 300,000 people were murdered in psychiatric hospitals in Germany, Austria, occupied Poland, the Protectorate of Bohemia and Moravia (now the Czech Republic), and the Soviet Union. The number of victims was originally recorded as 70,273 but this number has been increased by the discovery of victims listed in the archives of the former East Germany. (Note: Notes on patient records from the archive "R 179" of the Chancellery of the Führer Main Office II b. Between 1939 and 1945, about 200,000 women, men and children in psychiatric institutions of the German Reich were killed in covert actions by gas, medication or starvation. Original: Zwischen 1939 und 1945 wurden ca. 200.000 Frauen, Männer und Kinder aus psychiatrischen Einrichtungen des Deutschen Reichs im mehreren verdeckten Aktionen durch Vergasung, Medikamente oder unzureichende Ernährung ermordet.) About half of the victims were taken from church-run asylums. In June 1940, Paul Braune and Fritz von Bodelschwingh, who served as directors of sanatoriums, protested against the killings, being members of the Lutheran Confessing Church.

The Holy See announced on 2 December 1940 that the policy was contrary to divine law and that "the direct killing of an innocent person because of mental or physical defects is not allowed". Bishop Theophil Wurm of the Lutheran Confessing Church "wrote an open letter denouncing the policy." Beginning in the summer of 1941, protests were led in Germany by the Roman Catholic bishop of Münster, Clemens von Galen, whose intervention led to "the strongest, most explicit and most widespread protest movement against any Nazi policy since the beginning of the Third Reich", according to Richard J. Evans.

Several reasons have been suggested for the killings, including eugenics, racial hygiene, and saving money. Physicians in German and Austrian asylums continued many of the practices of Aktion T4 until the defeat of Germany in 1945, in spite of its official cessation in August 1941. The informal continuation of the policy led to 93,521 "beds emptied" by the end of 1941. (Note: Robert Lifton and Michael Burleigh estimated that twice the official number of T4 victims may have perished before the end of the war. Ryan and Schurman gave an estimated range of 200,000 and 250,000 victims of the policy upon the arrival of Allied troops in Germany.) Technology developed under Aktion T4, particularly the use of lethal gas on large numbers of people, was taken over by the medical division of the Reich Interior Ministry, along with the personnel of Aktion T4, who participated in the mass murder of Jewish people under Operation Reinhard. The number of people killed was about 200,000 in Germany and Austria, with about 100,000 victims in other European countries. Following the war, a number of the perpetrators were tried and convicted for murder and crimes against humanity.

== Background ==
At the beginning of the twentieth century, the sterilisation of people carrying what were considered to be hereditary defects and in some cases those exhibiting what was thought to be hereditary "antisocial" behaviour, was a respectable field of medicine. Canada, Denmark, Switzerland and the United States had passed laws enabling forced sterilisation. Studies conducted in the 1920s ranked Germany as a country that was unusually reluctant to introduce sterilisation legislation.

The policy and research agenda of racial hygiene and eugenics were promoted by Emil Kraepelin. The eugenic sterilisation of persons diagnosed with (and viewed as predisposed to) schizophrenia was advocated by Eugen Bleuler, who presumed racial deterioration because of "mental and physical cripples" in his Textbook of Psychiatry,

The more severely burdened should not propagate themselves... If we do nothing but make mental and physical cripples capable of propagating themselves, and the healthy stocks have to limit the number of their children because so much has to be done for the maintenance of others, if natural selection is generally suppressed, then unless we will get new measures our race must rapidly deteriorate.

The German eugenics movement had an extreme wing even before the Nazis came to power. As early as 1920, Alfred Hoche and Karl Binding advocated killing people whose lives were "unworthy of life" (lebensunwertes Leben). Darwinism was interpreted by them as justification of the demand for "beneficial" genes and eradication of the "harmful" ones. Summarising their views, Robert Lifton writes, "The argument went that the best young men died in war, causing a loss to the Volk of the best genes. The genes of those who did not fight (the worst genes) then proliferated freely, accelerating biological and cultural degeneration". In his book Mein Kampf (1924), Hitler wrote that one day racial hygiene "will appear as a deed greater than the most victorious wars of our present bourgeois era". The advocacy of eugenics in Germany gained ground after 1930, when the Depression was used to excuse cuts in funding to state mental hospitals, creating squalor and overcrowding.

Many German eugenicists were nationalists and antisemites, who embraced the Nazi regime with enthusiasm. Many were appointed to positions in the Health Ministry and German research institutes. Their ideas were gradually adopted by the majority of the German medical profession, from which Jewish and communist doctors were soon purged. In the 1930s, the Nazi Party had carried out a campaign of propaganda in favour of euthanasia. The Nazi Party Office of Racial Policy (RPA) produced leaflets, posters and short films to be shown in cinemas, pointing out to Germans the cost of maintaining asylums for the incurably ill and insane. These films included The Inheritance (Das Erbe, 1935), Victims of the Past (Opfer der Vergangenheit, 1937), which was given a major première in Berlin and was shown in all German cinemas, and I Accuse (Ich klage an, 1941) which was based on a novel by Hellmuth Unger, a consultant for "child euthanasia".

In July 1933, the "Law for the Prevention of Hereditarily Diseased Offspring" prescribed compulsory sterilisation for people with conditions thought to be hereditary, such as schizophrenia, epilepsy, Huntington's chorea and "imbecility". Sterilisation was also legalised for chronic alcoholism and other forms of social deviance. The law was administered by the Interior Ministry under Wilhelm Frick through special Hereditary Health Courts (Erbgesundheitsgerichte), which examined the inmates of nursing homes, asylums, prisons, aged-care homes and special schools, to select those to be sterilised. It is estimated that 360,000 people were sterilised under this law between 1933 and 1939.

Within the Nazi administration, the idea of including in the programme people with physical disabilities had to be expressed carefully, because the Reich Minister of Propaganda, Joseph Goebbels, had a deformed right leg. (Note: This was the result either of club foot or osteomyelitis. Goebbels is commonly said to have had club foot (talipes equinovarus), a congenital condition. William L. Shirer, who worked in Berlin as a journalist in the 1930s and was acquainted with Goebbels, wrote in The Rise and Fall of the Third Reich (1960) that the deformity was from a childhood attack of osteomyelitis and a failed operation to correct it.) After 1937, the acute shortage of labour in Germany arising from rearmament, meant that anyone capable of work was deemed to be "useful", exempted from the law and the rate of sterilisation declined.

== Implementation ==
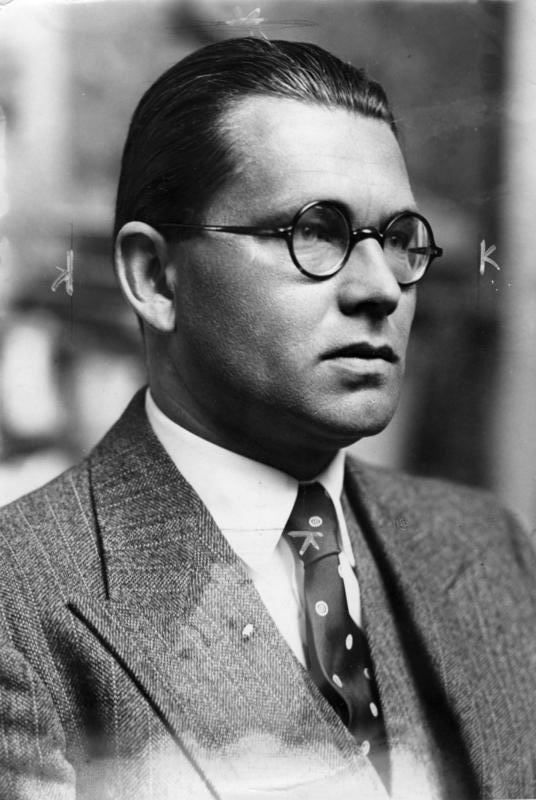
NSDAP Reichsleiter Philipp Bouhler, head of the T4 programme

Karl Brandt, Hitler's doctor, and Hans Lammers, the head of the Reich Chancellery, testified after the war that Hitler had told them as early as 1933—when the sterilisation law was passed—that he favoured the killing of the incurably ill but recognised that public opinion would not accept this. In 1935, however, Hitler told the Leader of Reich Doctors, Gerhard Wagner, that euthanasia would be easier to deal with during wartime and he intended "in the event of a war radically to solve the problem of the mental asylums."

Wagner informed the heads of a number of relevant medical institutions of Hitler's intentions and several responded enthusiastically. Hermann Pfannmuller, director of the Eglfing-Haar mental hospital near Munich, had already been conducting tours of his institution since 1933 to show the SS and other visitors those patients who he considered to be unworthy of life.

The first centralised Nazi euthanasia programme involved infants. In 1939 Hitler instructed Brandt to evaluate a petition sent by two parents for the "mercy killing" of their infant son, Gerhard Kretschmar who was blind and had physical and developmental disabilities. Following Brandt's investigation, the child was killed in July 1939. Hitler instructed Brandt to proceed in the same manner in all similar cases.

Brandt and the head of the Chancellery of the Führer, Philipp Bouhler, subsequently founded the Reich Committee for the Scientific Registering of Hereditary and Congenital Illnesses as a front organisation for the child euthanasia programme. On 18 August the committee issued an order to relevant health authorities requiring them to register infants up to the age of three with specified disabilities and medical conditions. The first child killed in special children's wards under the centralised programme was in summer 1940, although officials in some institutions had already begun killing children. By the end of the war more than 5,000 children had been killed.

In the summer of 1939, Hitler called a conference with Leonardo Conti, Reich Health Leader and State Secretary for Health in the Interior Ministry, and Hans Lammers, Chief of the Reich Chancellery, where he gave verbal authorisation for adult involuntary euthanasia. In October Hitler signed an unofficial decree (backdated to 1 September) authorising Brandt and Bouhler to set up a programme for the "mercy killing" of incurable adult patients. Brandt and Bouhler established a number of front organisations, including the Reich Cooperative for State Hospitals and Nursing Homes (Reichsarbeitsgemeinschaft Heil- und Pflegeanstalten), to maintain its secrecy. The programme later became known as Operation T4, after the address of its headquarters at Tiergartenstraße 4 in Berlin.

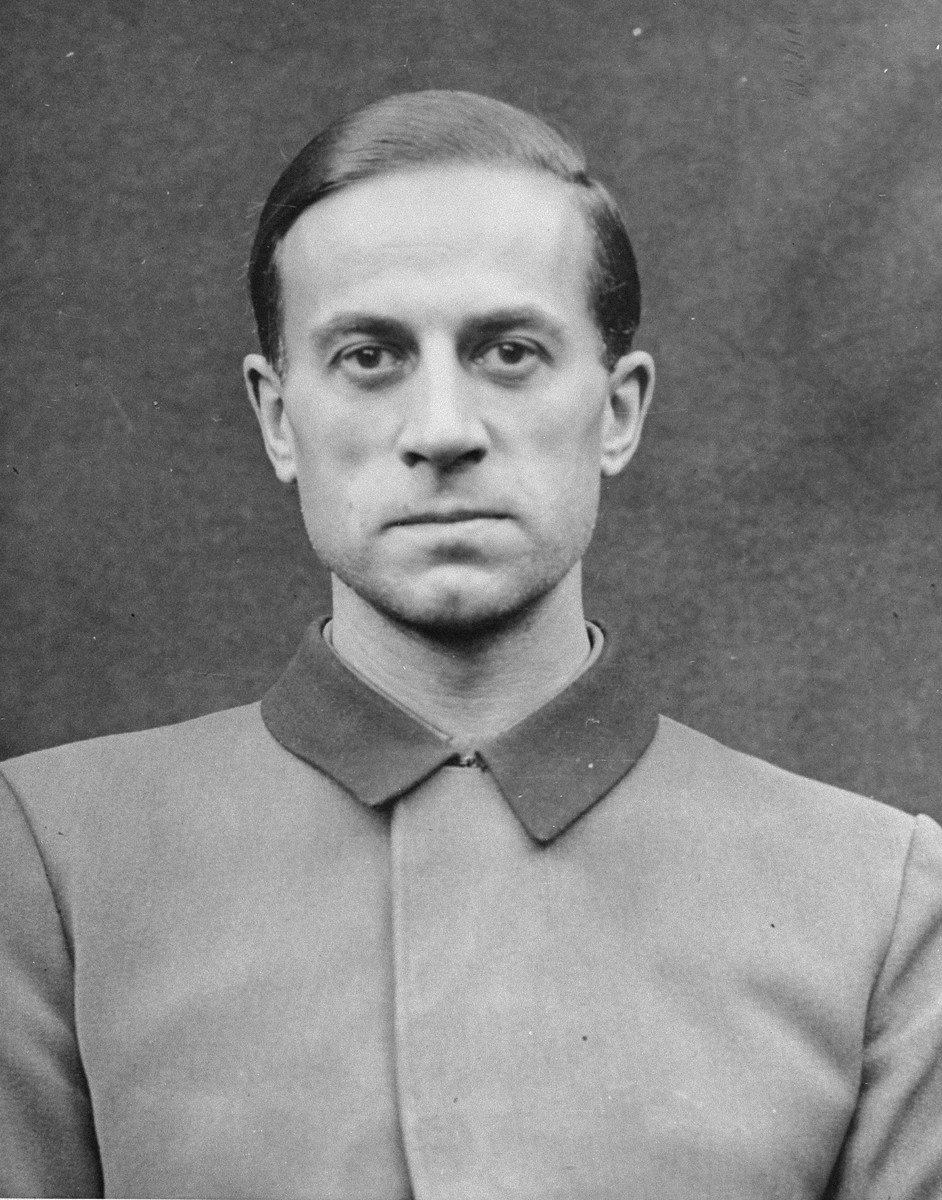
Karl Brandt, Hitler's personal doctor and organiser of Aktion T4

== Killing of children ==
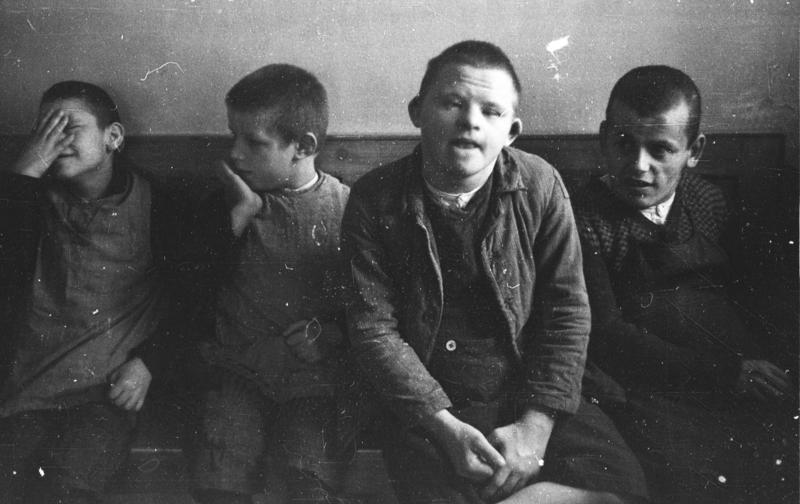
Schönbrunn Psychiatric Hospital, 1934. Photo by SS photographer Friedrich Franz Bauer

Brandt and Bouhler assigned the management of the child euthanasia programme to Chancellery official Viktor Brack and his subordinates such as Hans Hefelmann and Richard von Hegener.

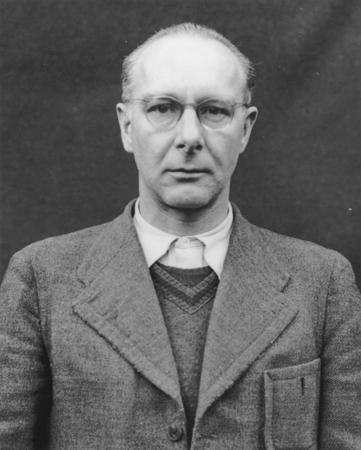
Viktor Brack, organiser of the T4 Programme

From August 1939 the Interior Ministry registered children with disabilities, requiring doctors and midwives to report all cases of newborns with severe disabilities; the 'guardian' consent element soon disappeared. Those to be killed were identified as "all children under three years of age in whom any of the following 'serious hereditary diseases' were 'suspected': idiocy and Down syndrome (especially when associated with blindness and deafness); microcephaly; hydrocephaly; malformations of all kinds, especially of limbs, head, and spinal column; and paralysis, including spastic conditions".

The reports were assessed by a panel of medical experts, of whom three were required to give their approval before a child could be transferred to a "special children's ward" for extermination. (Note: Professors Werner Catel (a Leipzig psychiatrist) and Hans Heinze, head of a state institution for children with intellectual disabilities at Görden near Brandenburg; Ernst Wentzler a Berlin paediatric psychiatrist and the author Dr. Helmut Unger.) The first of these wards was established in the summer of 1940. Eventually 30 were established in various hospitals throughout the Reich.

The Ministry used deceit when dealing with parents or guardians, particularly in Catholic areas, where parents were generally uncooperative. Parents were told that their children were being sent to "Special Sections", where they would receive improved treatment. The children sent to these centres were kept for "assessment" for a few weeks and then killed by injection of toxic chemicals, typically phenol; their deaths were recorded as "pneumonia". Autopsies were usually performed and brain samples were taken to be used for "medical research". Post mortem examinations apparently helped to ease the consciences of many of those involved, giving them the feeling that there was a genuine medical purpose to the killings.

When the Second World War began in September 1939, less rigorous standards of assessment and a quicker approval process were adopted. Older children and adolescents were included and the conditions covered came to include

... various borderline or limited impairments in children of different ages, culminating in the killing of those designated as juvenile delinquents. Jewish children could be placed in the net primarily because they were Jewish; and at one of the institutions, a special department was set up for 'minor Jewish-Aryan half-breeds'.

— Lifton

More pressure was placed on parents to agree to their children being sent away. Many parents suspected what was happening and refused consent, especially when it became apparent that institutions for children with disabilities were being systematically cleared of their charges. The parents were warned that they could lose custody of all their children and if that did not suffice, the parents could be threatened with call-up for 'labour duty'. By the end of the war, more than 5,000 children had been murdered under the programme. The last victim of child euthanasia in Germany was Richard Jenne on 29 May 1945, in the children's ward of the Kaufbeuren-Irsee state hospital in Bavaria more than three weeks after US Army troops had occupied the town.

== Killing of adults ==
=== Invasion of Poland ===
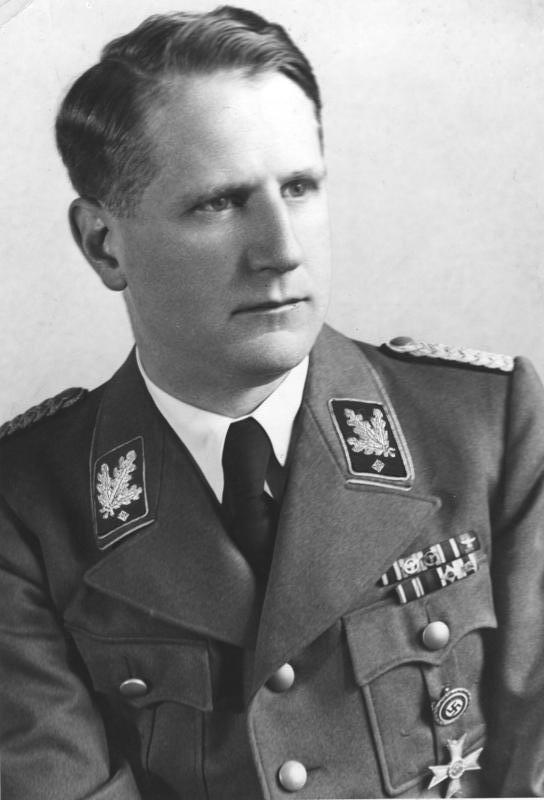
SS-Gruppenführer Leonardo Conti

Brandt and Bouhler developed plans to expand the programme of "euthanasia" to adults. In July 1939 they held a meeting attended by Conti and Professor Werner Heyde, head of the SS medical department. This meeting agreed to arrange a national register of all institutionalised people with mental illnesses or physical disabilities. The first adults with disabilities to be killed en masse by the Nazi regime were Poles. After the invasion on 1 September 1939, adults with disabilities were shot by the SS men of Einsatzkommando 16, Selbstschutz and EK-Einmann under the command of SS-Sturmbannführer Rudolf Tröger, overseen by Reinhard Heydrich, during Operation Tannenberg. (Note: The second phase of Operation Tannenberg referred to as the Unternehmen Tannenberg by Heydrich's Sonderreferat{ began in late 1939 under the codename Intelligenzaktion and lasted until January 1940, in which 36,000–42,000 people, including Polish children, were killed in Pomerania before the end of 1939.)

All hospitals and mental asylums of the Wartheland were emptied. The region was incorporated into Germany and earmarked for resettlement by Volksdeutsche following the German conquest of Poland. In the Danzig (now Gdańsk) area, some 7,000 Polish patients of institutions were shot. 10,000 were killed in the Gdynia area. Similar measures were taken in other areas of Poland destined for incorporation into Germany.

In October 1939, the first experiments with the gassing of patients were conducted at Fort VII in Posen (occupied Poznań), where hundreds of prisoners were killed by means of carbon monoxide poisoning, in an improvised gas chamber developed by Albert Widmann, chief chemist of the German Criminal Police (Kripo). In December 1939, Reichsführer-SS Heinrich Himmler witnessed one of these gassings, ensuring that this invention would later be put to much wider uses.

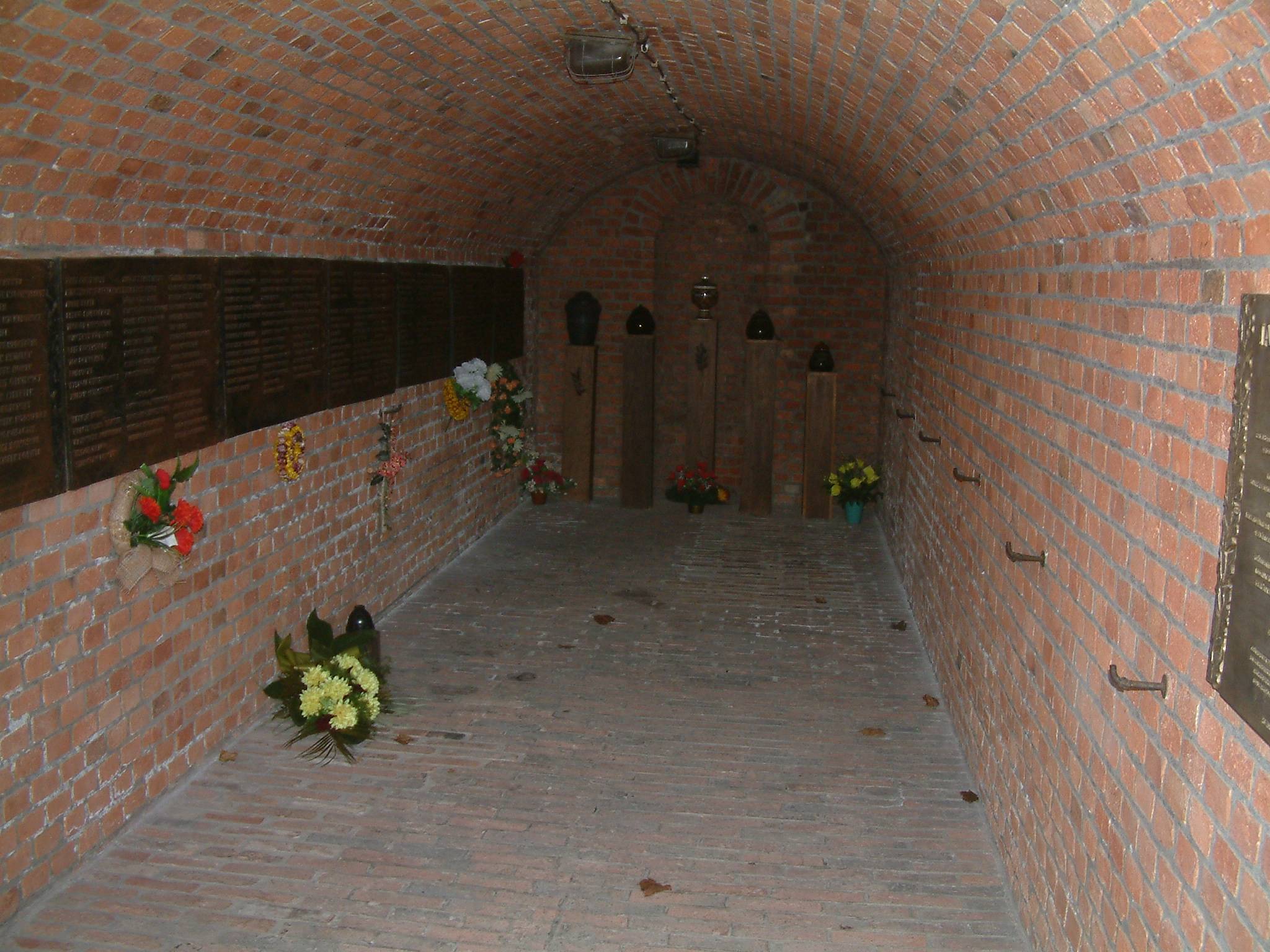
Bunker No. 17 in artillery wall of Fort VII in Poznań, used as improvised gas chamber for early experiments

The idea of killing adult mental patients soon spread from occupied Poland to adjoining areas of Germany, probably because Nazi Party and SS officers in these areas were most familiar with what was happening in Poland. These were the areas where Germans wounded from the Polish campaign were expected to be accommodated, which created a demand for hospital space. The Gauleiter of Pomerania, Franz Schwede-Coburg, sent 1,400 patients from five Pomeranian hospitals to undisclosed locations in occupied Poland, where they were shot. The Gauleiter of East Prussia, Erich Koch, had 1,600 patients killed out of sight. More than 8,000 Germans were killed in this initial wave of killings carried out on the orders of local officials, although Himmler certainly knew and approved of them.

The legal basis for the programme was a 1939 letter from Hitler, not a formal "Führer's decree" with the force of law. Hitler bypassed Conti, the Health Minister and his department, who might have raised questions about the legality of the programme and entrusted it to Bouhler and Brandt. (Note: Several drafts of a formal euthanasia law were prepared but Hitler refused to authorise them. The senior participants in the programme always knew that it was not a law, even by the loose definition of legality prevailing in Nazi Germany.)

Reich Leader Bouhler and Dr. Brandt are entrusted with the responsibility of extending the authority of physicians, to be designated by name, so that patients who, after a most critical diagnosis, on the basis of human judgment [menschlichem Ermessen], are considered incurable, can be granted mercy death [Gnadentod].

— Adolf Hitler, 1 September 1939

The killings were administered by Viktor Brack and his staff from Tiergartenstraße 4, disguised as the "Charitable Foundation for Cure and Institutional Care" offices which served as the front and was supervised by Bouhler and Brandt. The officials in charge included Herbert Linden, who had been involved in the child killing programme; Ernst-Robert Grawitz, chief physician of the SS and August Becker, an SS chemist. The officials selected the doctors who were to carry out the operational part of the programme; based on political reliability as long-term Nazis, professional reputation and sympathy for radical eugenics.

The list included physicians who had proved their worth in the child-killing programme, such as Unger, Heinze and Hermann Pfannmüller. The recruits were mostly psychiatrists, notably Professor Carl Schneider of Heidelberg, Professor Max de Crinis of Berlin and Professor Paul Nitsche from the Sonnenstein state institution. Heyde became the operational leader of the programme, succeeded later by Nitsche.

=== Listing of targets from hospital records ===
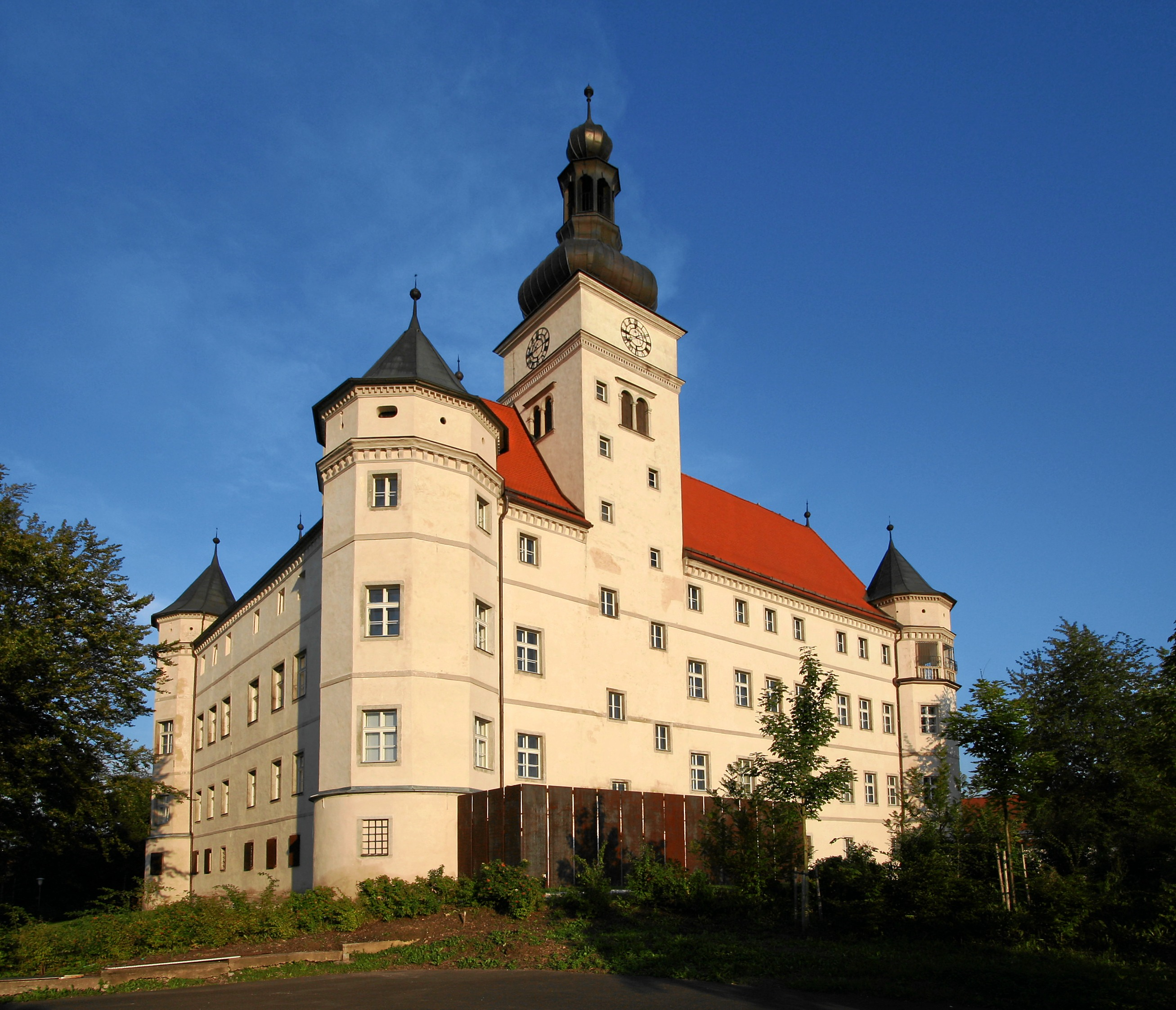
Hartheim killing centre, where over 18,000 people were murdered

The term Aktion T4 (Operation T4) is a post-war coining; contemporary German terms included Euthanasie (euthanasia) and Gnadentod (merciful death). The T4 programme stemmed from the Nazi Party policy of "racial hygiene", a belief that the German people needed to be cleansed of "racial enemies," including the mentally ill and disabled. New insulin shock treatments were used by German psychiatrists to find out if patients with schizophrenia were curable.

In early October, all hospitals, nursing homes, old-age homes and sanatoria were required to report all patients who had been institutionalised for five years or more, who had been committed as "criminally insane", who were of "non-Aryan race" or who had been diagnosed with any on a list of conditions. The conditions included schizophrenia, epilepsy, Huntington's chorea, advanced syphilis, senile dementia, paralysis, encephalitis and "terminal neurological conditions generally".

Many doctors and administrators assumed that the reports were to identify inmates who were capable of being drafted for "labour service" and tended to overstate the degree of incapacity of their patients, to protect them from labour conscription. When some institutions refused to co-operate, teams of T4 doctors, or Nazi medical students, visited and compiled the lists, sometimes in a haphazard and ideologically motivated way. In 1940, all Jewish patients were removed from institutions and murdered. (Note: According to Lifton, most Jewish inmates of German mental institutions were dispatched to Lublin in Poland in 1940 and killed there.)

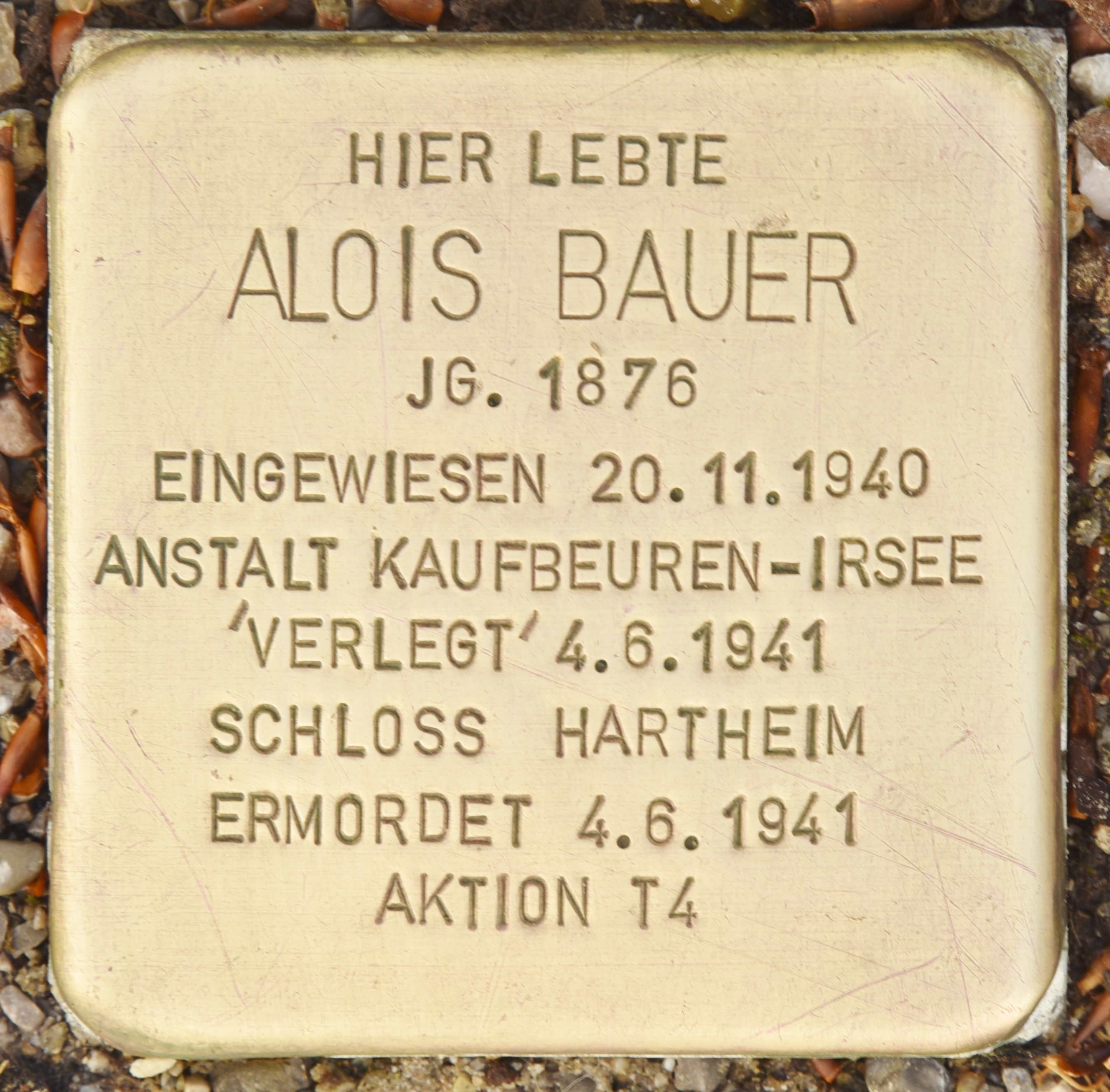
A Stolperstein for Alois Bauer from the Upper Palatinate, a 65-year-old experiencing hallucination and schizophrenia. He was murdered in the gas chamber at Hartheim.

As with child inmates, adults were assessed by a panel of experts, working at the Tiergartenstraße offices. The experts were required to make their judgements on the reports, not medical histories or examinations. Sometimes they dealt with hundreds of reports at a time. On each they marked a + (death), a - (life), or occasionally a ? meaning that they were unable to decide. Three "death" verdicts condemned the person and as with reviews of children, the process became less rigorous, the range of conditions considered "unsustainable" grew broader and zealous Nazis further down the chain of command increasingly made decisions on their own initiative.

== Gassing ==
The first gassings in Germany proper took place in January 1940 at the Brandenburg killing centre. The operation was headed by Brack, who said "the needle belongs in the hand of the doctor". Bottled pure carbon monoxide gas was used. At trials, Brandt described the process as a "major advance in medical history". Once the efficacy of the method was confirmed, it became standard and was instituted at a number of centres in Germany under the supervision of Widmann, Becker and Christian Wirth – a Kripo officer who later played a prominent role in the Final Solution (extermination of Jews) as commandant of newly built death camps in occupied Poland.

In addition to Brandenburg, the killing centres included Grafeneck Castle in Baden-Württemberg (10,824 dead), Schloss Hartheim near Linz in Austria (over 18,000 murdered), Sonnenstein in Saxony (15,000 victims), Bernburg in Saxony-Anhalt and Hadamar in Hesse (14,494 victims). The same facilities were also used to murder mentally sound prisoners transferred from concentration camps in Germany, Austria and occupied parts of Poland.

Condemned patients were transferred from their institutions to new centres in T4 Charitable Ambulance buses, called the Community Patients Transports Service. They were run by teams of SS men wearing white coats, to give it an air of medical care. To prevent the families and doctors of the patients from tracing them, the patients were often first sent to transit centres in major hospitals, where they were supposedly assessed. They were moved again to special treatment (Sonderbehandlung) centres. Families were sent letters explaining that owing to wartime regulations, it was not possible for them to visit relatives in these centres.

Most of these patients were murdered within 24 hours of arriving at the centres and their bodies cremated. Some bodies were dissected for medical research whilst others had their gold teeth extracted. For every person killed, a death certificate was prepared, giving a false but plausible cause of death. This was sent to the family along with an urn of ashes (random ashes, since the victims were cremated en masse). The preparation of thousands of falsified death certificates took up most of the working day of the doctors who operated the centres.

During 1940, the centres at Brandenburg, Grafeneck and Hartheim murdered nearly 10,000 people each, while another 6,000 were murdered at Sonnenstein. In all, about 35,000 people were killed in T4 operations that year. Operations at Brandenburg and Grafeneck were wound up at the end of the year, partly because the areas they served had been cleared and partly because of public opposition. In 1941, however, the centres at Bernburg and Sonnenstein increased their operations, while Hartheim (where Wirth and Franz Stangl were successively commandants) continued as before. Another 35,000 people were murdered before August 1941, when the T4 programme was officially shut down by Hitler. Even after that date the centres continued to be used to kill concentration camp inmates: eventually some 20,000 people in this category were killed. (Note: These figures come from the article Aktion T4 on the German Wikipedia, which cites Ernst Klee.)

In 1971, Gitta Sereny conducted interviews with Stangl, who was in prison in Düsseldorf, having been convicted of co-responsibility for killing 900,000 people, while commandant of the Sobibor and Treblinka extermination camps in Poland. Stangl gave Sereny a detailed account of the operations of the T4 programme based on his time as commandant of Hartheim killing centre. He described how the inmates of asylums were removed and transported by bus to Hartheim. Some were in no mental state to know what was happening to them but many were perfectly sane and for them forms of deception were used. They were told they were at a special clinic where they would receive improved treatment and were given a brief medical examination on arrival. They were induced to enter what appeared to be a shower block, where they were gassed with carbon monoxide. The ruse was also used at extermination camps. Some of the victims knew their fate and tried to defend themselves.

== Number of victims ==
The SS functionaries and hospital staff associated with Aktion T4 in the German Reich were paid from the central office at Tiergartenstraße 4 in Berlin from the spring of 1940. The SS and police from SS-Sonderkommando Lange responsible for murdering the majority of patients in the annexed territories of Poland since October 1939, took their salaries from the normal police fund, supervised by the administration of the newly formed Wartheland district. The programme in Germany and occupied Poland was overseen by Heinrich Himmler.

Before 2013, it was believed that 70,000 persons were murdered in the euthanasia programme, but the German Federal Archives reported that research in the archives of former East Germany indicated that the number of victims in Germany and Austria from 1939 to 1945 was about 200,000 persons and that another 100,000 persons were victims in other European countries. In the German T4 centres there was at least the semblance of legality in keeping records and writing letters. In Polish psychiatric hospitals no one was left behind. Killings were inflicted using gas-vans, sealed army bunkers and machine guns; families were not informed about the murdered relatives and the empty wards were handed over to the SS.

Victims of Aktion T4 (official data from 1985), 1940 – Sep 1941
T4 Center	Period	1940	1941	Total
Grafeneck	20 Jan – Dec 1940	9,839	—	9,839
Brandenburg	8 Feb – Oct 1940	9,772	—	9,772
Bernburg	21 November 1940 – 30 July 1943	—	8,601	8,601
Hartheim	6 May 1940 – Dec 1944	9,670	8,599	18,269
Sonnenstein	Jun 1940 – Sep 1942	5,943	7,777	13,720
Hadamar	Jan 1941 – 31 July 1942	—	10,072	10,072
Total by year		35,224	35,049	70,273
In hospitals in occupied Poland
Owińska	Oct 1939	1,100		
Kościan	Nov 1939 – Mar 1940	(2,750) 3,282		
Świecie	Oct–Nov 1939	1,350		
Kocborowo	22 September 1939 – Jan 1940 (1941–44)	2,562 (1,692)		
Dziekanka	7 December 1939 – 12 January 1940 (Jul 1941)	1,201 (1,043)		
Chełm	12 January 1940	440		
Warta	31 March 1940 (16 Jun 1941)	581 (499)		
Działdowo	21 May – 8 July 1940	1,858		
Kochanówka	13 March 1940 – Aug 1941	(minimum of) 850		
Helenówek (et al.)	1940–1941	2,200–2,300		
Lubliniec	Nov 1941	(children) 194		
Choroszcz	Aug 1941	700		
Rybnik	1940–1945	2,000		
Total by number		c. 16,153		

== Technology and personnel transfer to death camps ==
After the official end of the T4 programme in August 1941, most of the personnel and high-ranking officials, as well as gassing technology and the techniques used to deceive victims, were transferred under the jurisdiction of the national medical division of the Reich Interior Ministry. Further gassing experiments with the use of mobile gas chambers (Einsatzwagen) were conducted at Soldau concentration camp by Herbert Lange following Operation Barbarossa. Lange was appointed commander of the Chełmno extermination camp in December 1941. He was given three gas vans by the Reich Security Main Office (RSHA), converted by the Gaubschat GmbH in Berlin and before February 1942, killed 3,830 Polish Jews and around 4,000 Romani, under the guise of "resettlement".

After the 20 January 1942 Wannsee Conference, implementation of gassing technology was accelerated by Heydrich. Beginning in the spring of 1942, three killing factories were built secretly in east-central Poland. The SS officers responsible for the earlier Aktion T4, including Wirth, Stangl and Irmfried Eberl, had important roles in the implementation of the "Final Solution" for the next two years. (Note: Role of T4 "Inspector" Christian Wirth in the Holocaust.) The first killing centre, equipped with stationary gas chambers, modelled on technology developed under Aktion T4, was established at Bełżec in the General Government territory of occupied Poland; the decision preceded the Wannsee Conference by three months.

== Opposition ==
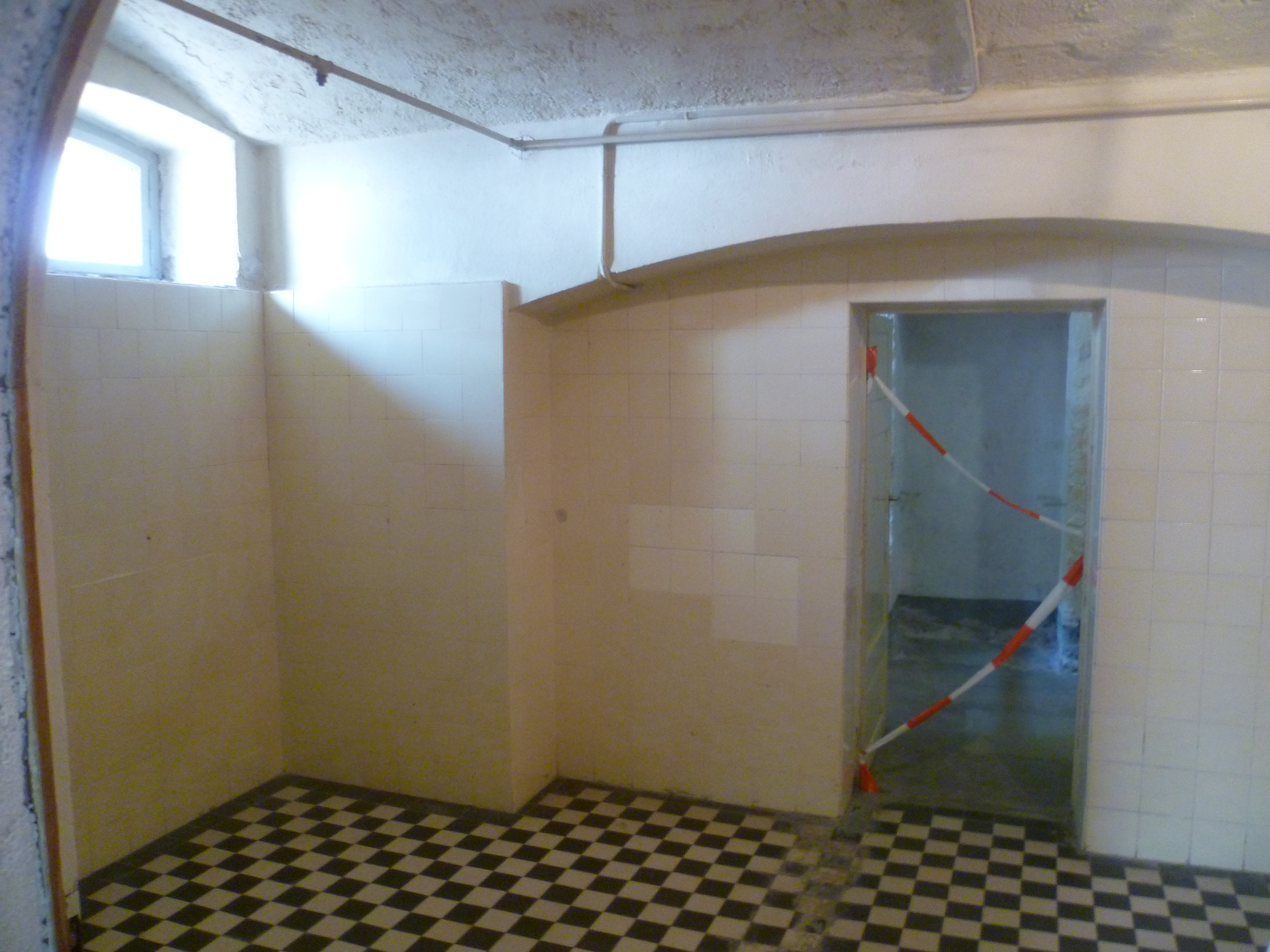
Gas chamber at Hadamar

In January 1939, Brack commissioned a paper from Professor of Moral Theology at the University of Paderborn, Joseph Mayer, on the likely reactions of the churches in the event of a state euthanasia programme being instituted. Mayer – a longstanding euthanasia advocate – reported that the churches would not oppose such a programme if it was seen to be in the national interest. Brack showed this paper to Hitler in July and it may have increased his confidence that the "euthanasia" programme would be acceptable to German public opinion. Notably, when Sereny interviewed Mayer shortly before his death in 1967, he denied that he formally condoned the killing of people with disabilities but no copies of this paper are known to survive.

Some bureaucrats opposed the T4 programme; Lothar Kreyssig, a district judge and member of the Confessing Church, wrote to Justice Minister Franz Gürtner protesting that the action was illegal since no law or formal decree from Hitler had authorised it. Gürtner replied, "If you cannot recognise the will of the Führer as a source of law, then you cannot remain a judge" and had Kreyssig dismissed.

Hitler had a policy of not issuing written instructions for matters which could later be condemned by the international community, but made an exception when he provided Bouhler and Brack with written authority for the T4 programme. Hitler wrote a confidential letter in October 1939 to overcome opposition within the German state bureaucracy. Hitler told Bouhler that, "the Führer's Chancellery must under no circumstances be seen to be active in this matter". Gürtner had to be shown Hitler's letter in August 1940 to gain his co-operation.

=== Exposure ===
In the towns where the killing centres were located, some people saw the inmates arrive in buses, saw smoke from the crematoria chimneys and noticed that the buses were returning empty. In Hadamar, ashes containing human hair rained down on the town and despite the strictest orders, some of the staff at the killing centres talked about what was going on. In some cases families could tell that the causes of death in certificates were false, e.g. when a patient was claimed to have died of appendicitis, even though his appendix had been removed some years earlier. In other cases, families in the same town would receive death certificates on the same day. In May 1941, the Frankfurt County Court wrote to Gürtner describing scenes in Hadamar, where children shouted in the streets that people were being taken away in buses to be gassed.

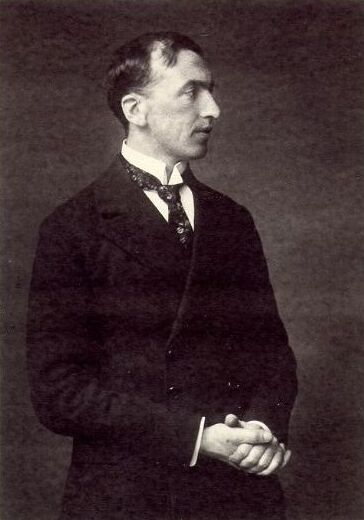
Hans Gerhard Creutzfeldt in 1920

During 1940, rumours of what was taking place spread and many Germans withdrew their relatives from asylums and sanatoria to care for them at home, often with great expense and difficulty. In some places doctors and psychiatrists co-operated with families to have patients discharged or if the families could afford it, transferred them to private clinics beyond the reach of T4. Other doctors "re-diagnosed" patients so that they no longer met the T4 criteria, which risked exposure when Nazi zealots from Berlin conducted inspections. In Kiel, Professor Hans Gerhard Creutzfeldt managed to save nearly all of his patients. Lifton listed a handful of psychiatrists and administrators who opposed the killings; many doctors collaborated, either through ignorance, agreement with Nazi eugenicist policies or fear of the regime.

Protest letters were sent to the Reich Chancellery and the Ministry of Justice, some from Nazi Party members. The first open protest against the removal of people from asylums took place at Absberg in Franconia in February 1941 and others followed. The SD report on the incident at Absberg noted that "the removal of residents from the Ottilien Home has caused a great deal of unpleasantness" and described large crowds of Catholic townspeople, among them Party members, protesting against the action.

Similar petitions and protests occurred throughout Austria as rumours spread of mass-murder at the Hartheim killing centre and of mysterious deaths at the children's clinic, Am Spiegelgrund in Vienna. Anna Wödl, a nurse and mother of a child with a disability, vehemently petitioned to Hermann Linden at the Reich Ministry of the Interior in Berlin to prevent her son, Alfred, from being transferred from Gugging, where he lived (and which also later became the site of hundreds of murders). Wödl failed and Alfred was sent to Am Spiegelgrund, where he was murdered on 22 February 1941. His brain was preserved in formaldehyde for "research" and stored in the clinic for sixty years.

=== Church protests ===
The Lutheran theologian Friedrich von Bodelschwingh (director of the Bethel Institution for Epilepsy at Bielefeld) and Pastor Paul-Gerhard Braune (director of the Hoffnungstal Institution near Berlin) protested. Bodelschwingh negotiated directly with Brandt and indirectly with Hermann Göring, whose cousin was a prominent psychiatrist. Braune had meetings with Gürtner, who was always dubious about the legality of the programme. Gürtner later wrote a strongly worded letter to Hitler protesting against it; Hitler did not read it but was told about it by Lammers.

Bishop Theophil Wurm, presiding over the Evangelical-Lutheran Church in Württemberg, wrote to Interior Minister Frick in March 1940 "denouncing the policy"; that month a confidential report from the Sicherheitsdienst (SD) in Austria, warned that the killing programme must be implemented with stealth "...to avoid a probable backlash of public opinion during the war". On 4 December 1940, Reinhold Sautter, the Supreme Church Councillor of the Württemberg State Church, complained to the Nazi Ministerial Councillor Eugen Stähle against the murders in Grafeneck Castle. Stähle said "The fifth commandment Thou shalt not kill, is no commandment of God but a Jewish invention".

Bishop Heinrich Wienken of Berlin, a leading member of the Caritas Association, was selected by the Fulda episcopal synod to represent the views of the Catholic Church in meetings with T4 operatives. In 2008, Michael Burleigh wrote

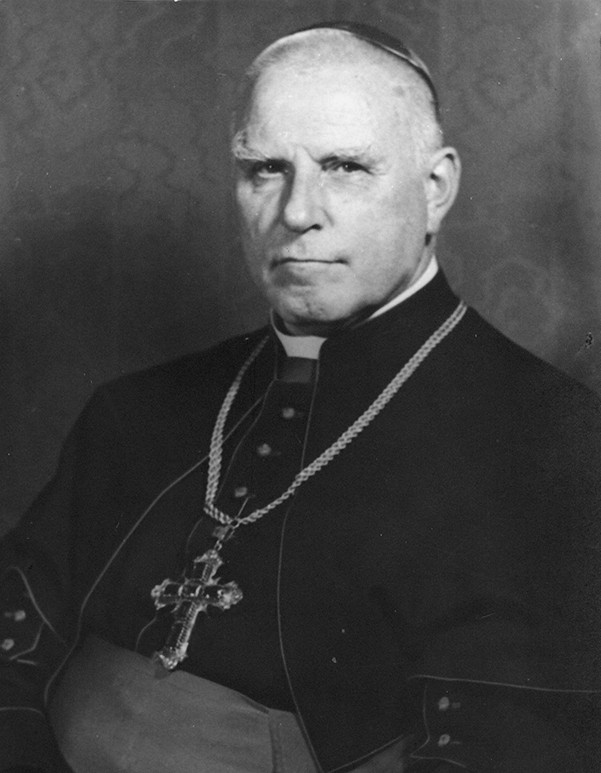
Clemens von Galen

Wienken seems to have gone partially native in the sense that he gradually abandoned an absolute stance based on the Fifth Commandment in favour of winning limited concessions regarding the restriction of killing to 'complete idiots', access to the sacraments and the exclusion of ill Roman Catholic priests from these policies.

Despite a decree issued by the Vatican on 2 December 1940 stating that the T4 policy was "against natural and positive Divine law" and that "The direct killing of an innocent person because of mental or physical defects is not allowed", the Catholic Church hierarchy in Germany decided to take no further action. Incensed by the Nazi appropriation of Church property in Münster to accommodate people made homeless by an air raid, in July and August 1941, the bishop of Münster, Clemens August Graf von Galen, gave four sermons criticising the Nazis for arresting Jesuits, confiscating church property and for the euthanasia program. Galen sent the text to Hitler by telegram, calling on

... the Führer to defend the people against the Gestapo. It is a terrible, unjust and catastrophic thing when man opposes his will to the will of God ... We are talking about men and women, our compatriots, our brothers and sisters. Poor unproductive people if you wish, but does this mean that they have lost their right to live?

Galen's sermons were not reported in the German press but were circulated illegally in leaflets. The text was dropped by the Royal Air Force over German troops. In 2009, Richard J. Evans wrote that "This was the strongest, most explicit and most widespread protest movement against any policy since the beginning of the Third Reich". Local Nazis asked for Galen to be arrested but Goebbels told Hitler that such action would provoke a revolt in Westphalia and Hitler decided to wait until after the war to take revenge.

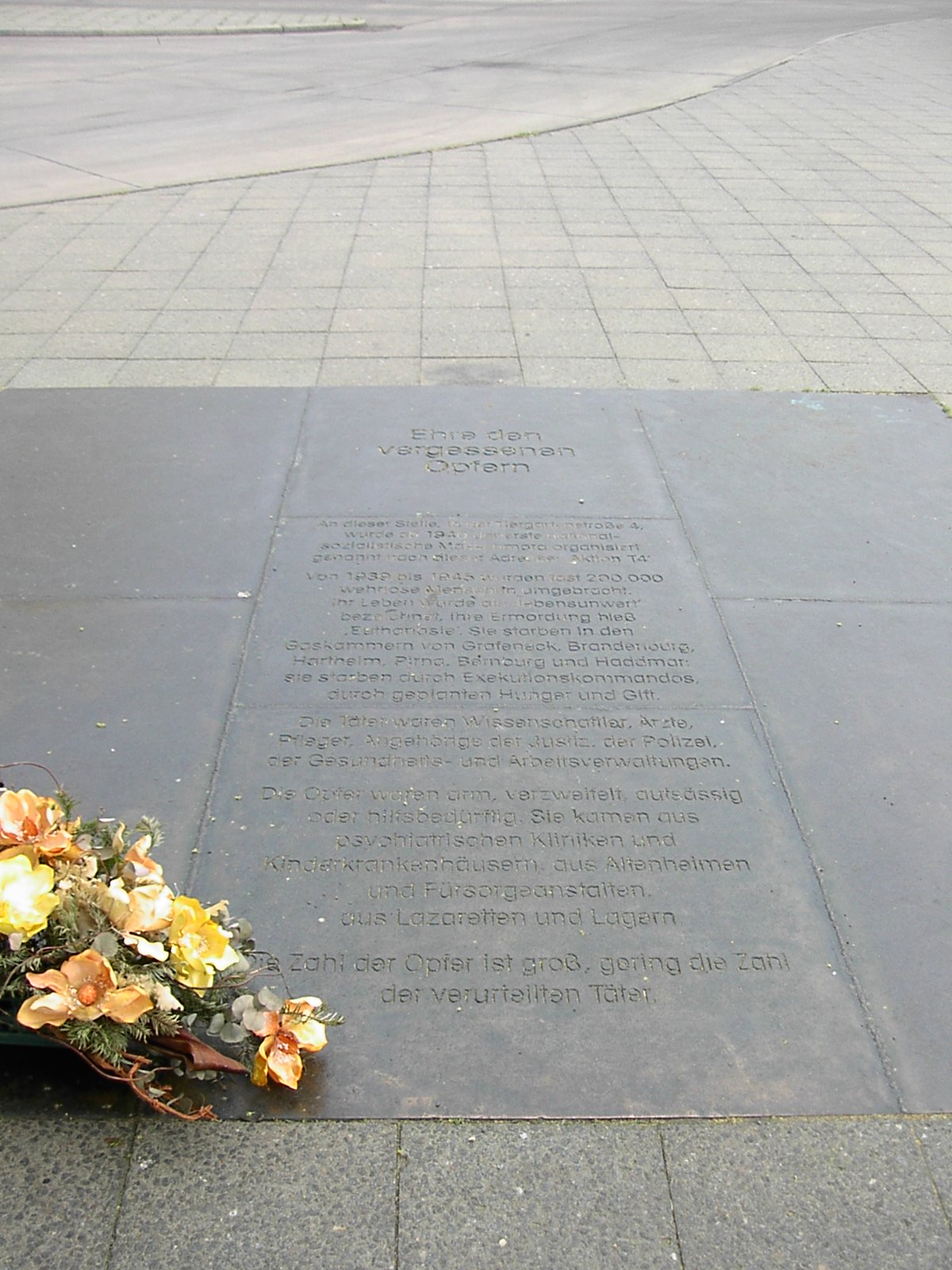
A plaque set in the pavement at No 4 Tiergartenstraße commemorates the victims of the Nazi euthanasia programme.

In 1986, Lifton wrote, "Nazi leaders faced the prospect of either having to imprison prominent, highly admired clergymen and other protesters – a course with consequences in terms of adverse public reaction they greatly feared – or else end the programme". Evans considered it "at least possible, even indeed probable" that the T4 programme would have continued beyond Hitler's initial quota of 70,000 deaths but for the public reaction to Galen's sermon. Burleigh called assumptions that the sermon affected Hitler's decision to suspend the T4 programme "wishful thinking" and noted that the various Church hierarchies did not complain after the transfer of T4 personnel to Aktion Reinhard.

British historian Alec Ryrie wrote that "Braune, von Bodelschwingh, Kreyssig, Wurn, von Galen, and others had demonstrated that when a broad enough swatch of Germany's Christians took a stand, it was possible to save lives." On the other hand, Henry Friedlander wrote that it was not the criticism from the Church but rather the loss of secrecy and "general popular disquiet about the way euthanasia was implemented" that caused the killings to be suspended.

Galen had detailed knowledge of the euthanasia programme by July 1940 but did not speak out until almost a year after Protestants had begun to protest. In 2002, Beth A. Griech-Polelle wrote:

Worried lest they be classified as outsiders or internal enemies, they waited for Protestants, that is the "true Germans", to risk a confrontation with the government first. If the Protestants were able to be critical of a Nazi policy, then Catholics could function as "good" Germans and yet be critical too.

On 29 June 1943, Pope Pius XII issued the encyclical Mystici corporis Christi, in which he condemned the fact that "physically deformed people, mentally disturbed people and hereditarily ill people have at times been robbed of their lives" in Germany. Following this, in September 1943, a bold but ineffectual condemnation was read by bishops from pulpits across Germany, denouncing the killing of "the innocent and defenceless mentally handicapped and mentally ill, the incurably infirm and fatally wounded, innocent hostages and disarmed prisoners of war and criminal offenders, people of a foreign race or descent".

== Suspension and continuity ==
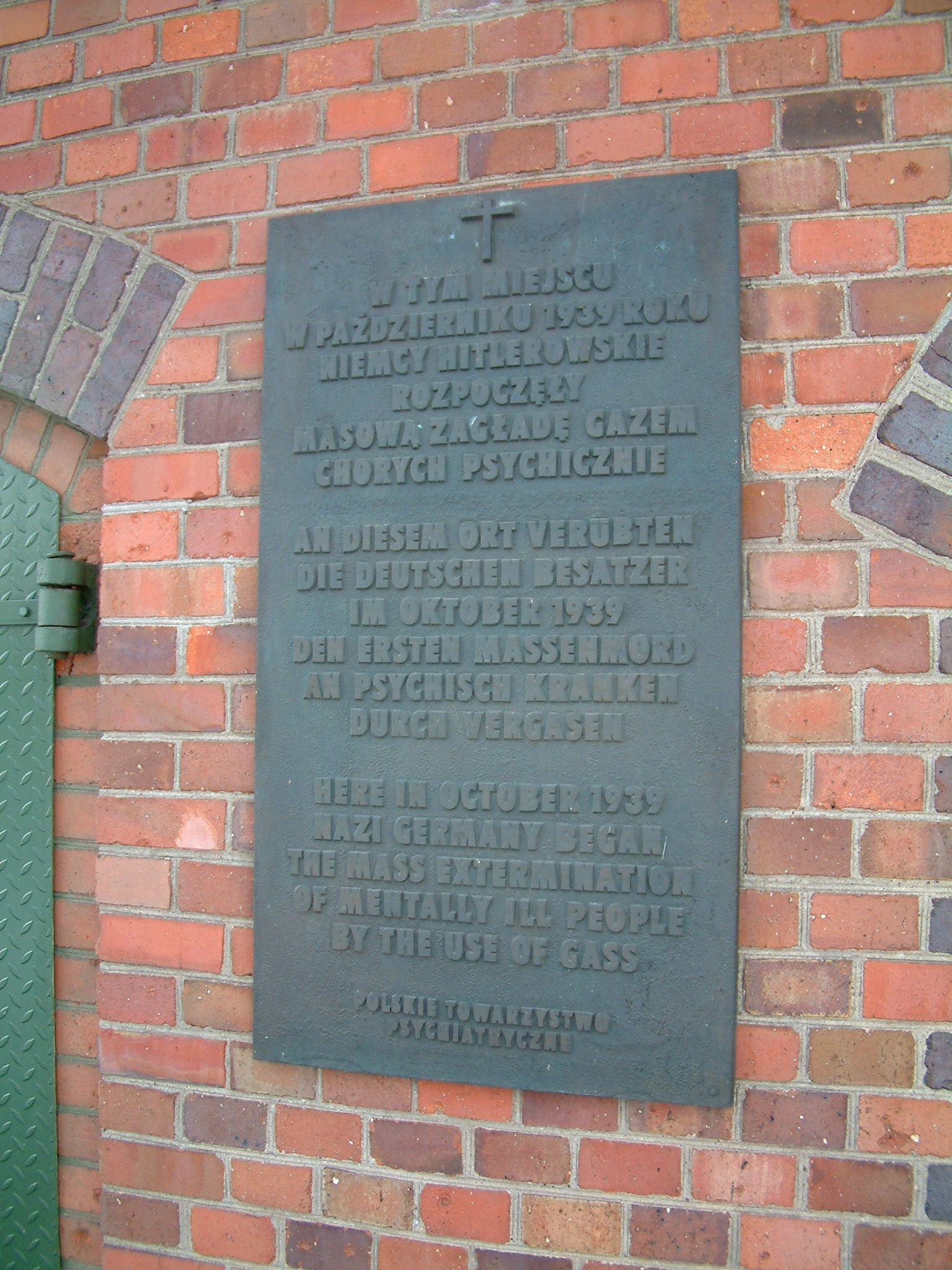
Commemorative plaque on wall on bunker No. 17 in Fort VII

On 24 August 1941, Hitler ordered the suspension of the T4 killings. After the invasion of the Soviet Union in June, many T4 personnel were transferred to the eastern front. The projected death total for the T4 programme of 70,000 deaths had been reached by August 1941. The termination of the T4 programme did not end the killing of people with disabilities; from the end of 1941, on the initiative of institute directors and local party leaders, the killing of adults and children continued, albeit less systematically, until the end of the war.

Occupying forces in the Soviet Union routinely killed mentally disabled people to clear out the facilities for German use or to economize on supplies. In December 1941, with the consent of General Georg von Küchler, commander of the 18th Army, SD personnel shot 240 patients in a psychiatric facility.

By the end of 1941, about 100,000 people had been killed in the T4 programme. From mid-1941, concentration camp prisoners too feeble or too much trouble to keep alive were murdered after a cursory psychiatric examination under Action 14f13.

After the bombing of Hamburg in July 1943, occupants of old age homes were killed. In the post-war trial of Dr. Hilda Wernicke, Berlin, August 1946, testimony was given that "500 old, broken women" who had survived the bombing of Stettin in June 1944 were euthanised at the Meseritz-Oberwalde Asylum. The Hartheim, Bernberg, Sonnenstein and Hadamar centres continued in use as "wild euthanasia" centres to kill people sent from all over Germany, until 1945. The methods were lethal injection or starvation, those employed before use of gas chambers.

== Post-war ==
=== Doctors' trial ===
After the war trials were held in connection with the Nazi euthanasia programme at various places including Dresden, Frankfurt, Graz, Nuremberg and Tübingen. In December 1946 an American military tribunal (commonly called the Doctors' trial) prosecuted 23 doctors and administrators for their roles in war crimes and crimes against humanity. These crimes included the systematic killing of those deemed "unworthy of life", including people with mental disabilities, the people who were institutionalised mentally ill and people with physical impairments. After 140 days of proceedings, including the testimony of 85 witnesses and the submission of 1,500 documents, in August 1947 the court pronounced 16 of the defendants guilty. Seven were sentenced to death; the men, including Brandt and Brack, were executed on 2 June 1948.

The indictment read in part:

14. Between September 1939 and April 1945 the defendants Karl Brandt, Blome, Brack, and Hoven unlawfully, wilfully, and knowingly committed crimes against humanity, as defined by Article II of Control Council Law No. 10, in that they were principals in, accessories to, ordered, abetted, took a consenting part in, and were connected with plans and enterprises involving the execution of the so called "euthanasia" program of the German Reich, in the course of which the defendants herein murdered hundreds of thousands of human beings, including German civilians, as well as civilians of other nations. The particulars concerning such murders are set forth in paragraph 9 of count two of this indictment and are incorporated herein by reference.

— International Military Tribunal

Earlier, in 1945, American forces tried seven staff members of the Hadamar killing centre for the killing of Soviet and Polish nationals, which was within their jurisdiction under international law, as these were the citizens of wartime allies. (Hadamar was within the American Zone of Occupation in Germany. This was before the Allied resolution of December 1945, to prosecute individuals for "crimes against humanity" for such mass atrocities.) Alfons Klein, Heinrich Ruoff and Karl Willig were sentenced to death and executed; the other four were given long prison sentences. In 1946, reconstructed German courts tried members of the Hadamar staff for the murders of nearly 15,000 German citizens. The chief physician, Adolf Wahlmann and Irmgard Huber, the head nurse, were convicted.

=== Other perpetrators ===
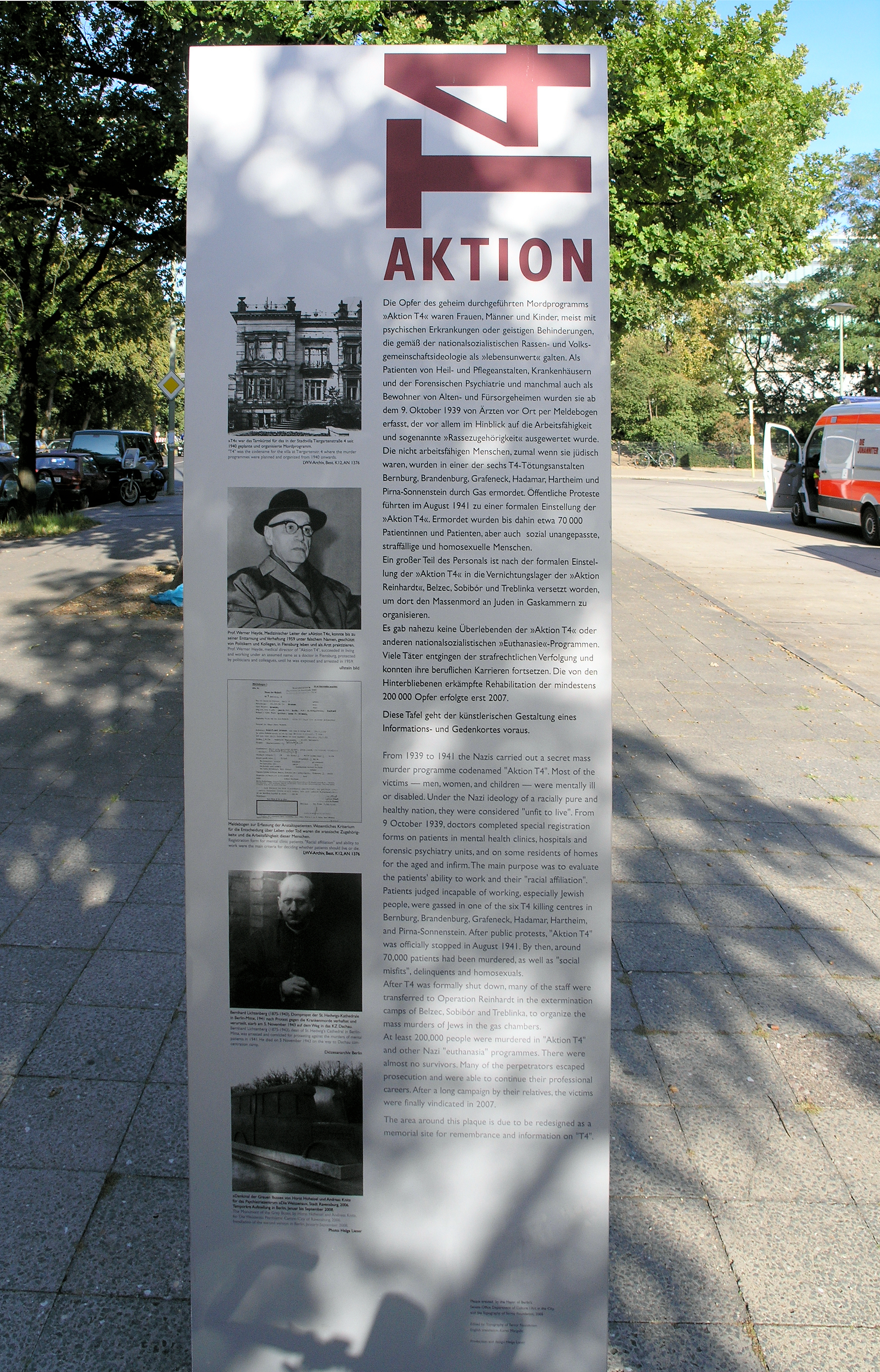
Aktion T4 marker (2009) in Berlin

- Dietrich Allers was sentenced to eight years time served in December 1968.
- Erich Bauer, arrested in 1949 and sentenced to death, which was automatically commuted to life in prison due to West Germany's abolition of capital punishment. He died in prison in 1980.
- August Becker, initially sentenced to three years after the war, in 1960 was tried again and sentenced to ten years in prison. He was released early due to ill health and died in 1967.
- Werner Blankenburg lived under an alias and died in 1957.
- Philipp Bouhler committed suicide in captivity, May 1945.
- Werner Catel was cleared by a denazification board after World War II and was head of paediatrics at Kiel University. He retired early after his role in the T4 programme was exposed but continued to support the killing of children with mental and physical disabilities.
- Leonardo Conti hanged himself in captivity on 6 October 1945.
- Professor Max de Crinis took his own life via a cyanide capsule after poisoning his family.
- Fritz Cropp d. 6 April 1984, Bremen. A Nazi official in Oldenburg, Cropp was appointed the country medical officer of health in 1933. In 1935 he transferred to Berlin, where he worked as a ministerial adviser in the Division IV (health care and people care) in the Ministry of the Interior. In 1939, he became assistant director; Cropp was involved in the Nazi "euthanasia" Aktion T4 in 1940. He was Herbert Linden's superior and was responsible for patient transfers.
- Irmfried Eberl captured 1948; killed himself to avoid trial.
- Gottfried von Erdmannsdorff, commander of Fortress Mogilev, where many physically and mentally disabled prisoners were killed; executed by the Soviet Union in 1946.
- Ernst-Robert Grawitz killed himself shortly before the fall of Berlin in April 1945.
- Heinrich Gross was tried twice. One sentence was overturned and the charges in the second trial in 2000 were dropped as a result of his dementia; he died in 2005.
- Lorenz Hackenholt vanished in 1945.
- Hans Heinze was convicted of crimes against humanity for his work at the Brandenburg killing centre and served seven years in an NKVD special camp.
- Philipp, Landgrave of Hesse, the governor of Hesse-Nassau, was tried in 1947 at Hadamar for his role in Aktion T4 but was sentenced only to two years' "time served"; he died in 1980.
- Werner Heyde escaped detection for 18 years and took his own life in 1964, before his trial.
- Josef Hirtreiter served time in prison from 1951 to 1977 for gassings of Jews at the Treblinka extermination camp. His involvement at the Hadamar clinic was alleged but could never be proved.
- Ernst Illing was the director of the Vienna Psychiatric-Neurological Clinic for Children Am Spielgrund, where he killed about 200 children; he was sentenced to death on 18 July 1946.
- Erwin Jekelius, former director of Am Spiegelgrund, died in a prison camp in the Soviet Union in 1952.
- Erich Koch served time in prison from 1950 to his death in 1986.
- Erwin Lambert died in 1976.
- Hans Lammers was sentenced to 20 years imprisonment after being convicted in the Ministries Trial. This was later commuted to 10 years and Lammers was released in 1951. He died in 1962.
- Herbert Lange was killed by Allied troops during the Battle of Berlin.
- Herbert Linden took his own life in 1945. Overseers of the programme were initially Herbert Linden and Werner Heyde. Linden was later replaced by Hermann Paul Nitsche.
- Heinrich Matthes was sentenced to life imprisonment at the Treblinka trials.
- Friedrich Mennecke died in 1947 while awaiting trial.

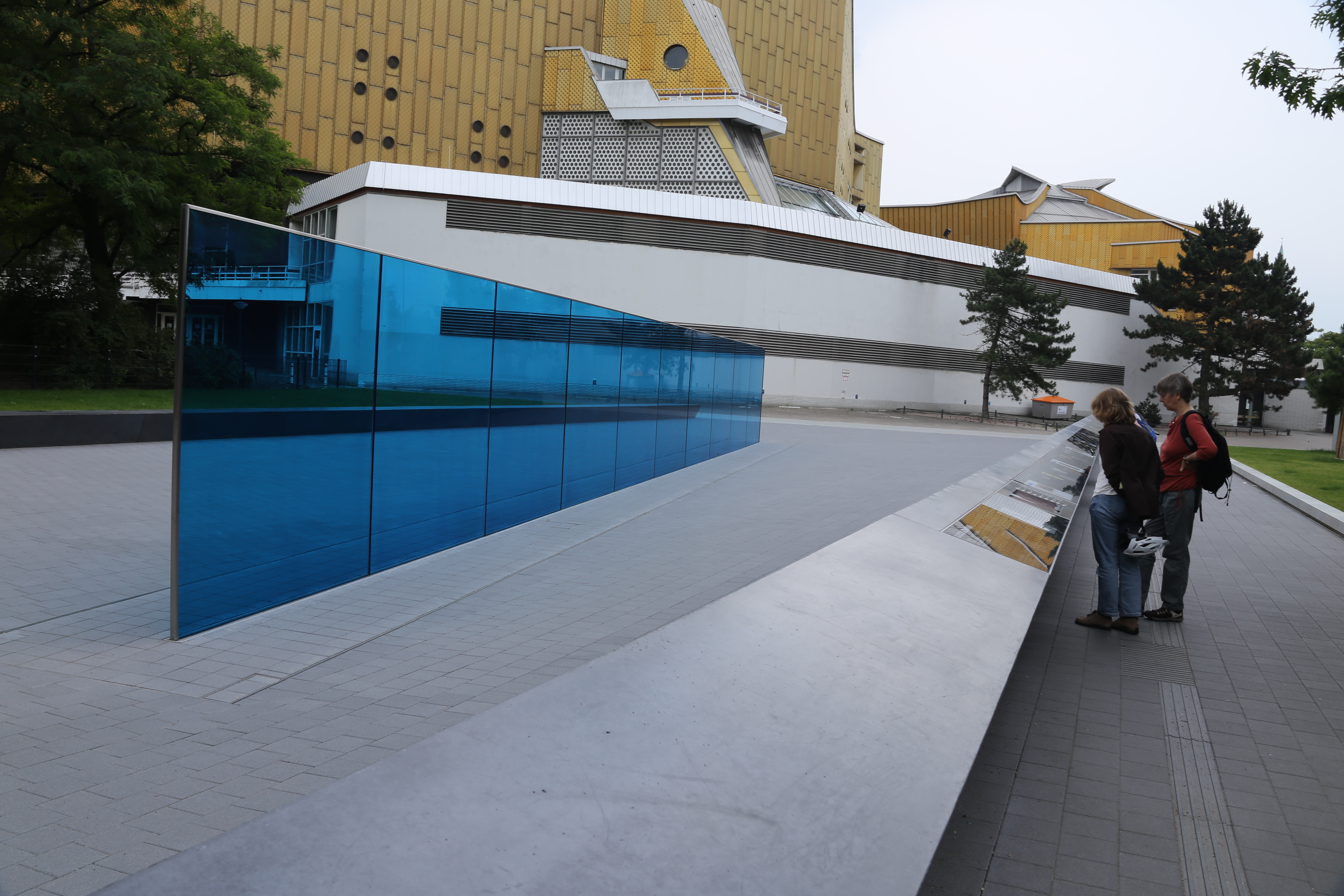
Aktion T4 memorial at Tiergartenstraße 4, Berlin

- Franz Niedermoser, chief doctor of the Klagenfurt extermination center, was executed in 1946 after being convicted in the Klagenfurt trial.
- Paul Nitsche was tried and executed by an East German court in 1948.
- Josef Oberhauser served eight years of a 15-year prison sentence for crimes against humanity and was released in 1956. He later received a further four years imprisonment at the Belzec trial for 300,000 counts of acting as an accessory to murder.
- Hermann Pfannmüller served five years in prison as an accessory to murder.
- Franz Reichleitner was killed by Italian partisans in 1944.
- Professor Carl Schneider hanged himself in his prison cell in 1946, while awaiting trial.
- Walter Schultze was sentenced to four years at hard labor in May 1960 for aiding and abetting manslaughter of 380 persons.
- Franz Schwede was sentenced to 10 years in prison in 1948 and was released in 1956; he died in 1960.
- Franz Stangl, after being caught in Brazil in 1967, was sentenced to life imprisonment. He died of heart failure six months into the sentence.
- Rudolf Tröger was killed in action at the Maginot Line.
- Marianne Türk was a doctor at Vienna Psychiatric-Neurological Clinic for Children Am Spielgrund where, with Ernst Illing, she killed 200 children. She was sentenced to 10 years prison on 18 July 1946.
- Reinhold Vorberg was sentenced to ten years time served in December 1968.
- Albert Widmann was convicted in two trials in the 1960s and served six years in prison.
- Christian Wirth was killed by Yugoslav partisans in 1944.

The Stasi (Ministry for State Security) of East Germany stored around 30,000 files of Aktion T4 in their archives. Those files became available to the public after German Reunification in 1990, leading to a new wave of research on these wartime crimes.

== Memorials ==
The German national memorial to the people with disabilities murdered by the Nazis was dedicated in 2014 in Berlin. It is located in the pavement of a site next to the Tiergarten park, the location of the former villa at Tiergartenstraße 4 in Berlin, where more than 60 Nazi bureaucrats and doctors worked in secret under the "T4" programme to organise the mass murder of sanatorium and psychiatric hospital patients deemed unworthy to live.

== See also ==
- Ableism
- Memorandum Authorizing Involuntary Euthanasia
- Nazi doctors (list)
- Nazi eugenics, the racially based social policies that placed the improvement of the Aryan race at the heart of Nazis ideology.
- Nazi medical experimentation
- Operation Reinhard, men of Aktion T4 provided expertise for building the extermination camps during the Holocaust.
- Aktion 14f13 (1941–44), a Nazi extermination operation that killed prisoners who were sick, elderly, or deemed no longer fit for work
- Racial hygiene
- T4-Gutachter experts selecting victims killed by gas in "euthanasia" centers
- Ich klage an, Nazi pro-euthanasia propaganda film
- Life unworthy of life

Killing centers

- Am Spiegelgrund clinic
- Bernburg killing centre
- Brandenburg killing centre
- Grafeneck killing centre
- Hadamar killing centre
- Hartheim killing centre
- Soldau concentration camp
- Sonnenstein killing centre
- Jewish skeleton collection
- Nazi euthanasia and the Catholic Church
