= Euthanasia trials =

Holocaust trials

The Euthanasia trials (German: Euthanasie-Prozesse) were legal proceedings against the main perpetrators and accomplices involved in the "euthanasia" murders of the Nazi era in Germany.

The first euthanasia trial was held by the United States in October 1945 to prosecute doctors and nurses at the Hadamar killing centre for the murder of Polish and Russian workers sick with tuberculosis in summer 1944. All seven defendants were found guilty, and three were executed. Euthanasia was a tangential issue at the Nuremberg Doctors' Trial, held by the United States from December 1946 to August 1947, as only four of its 23 defendants were charged with participation in the euthanasia programme: Karl Brandt, Viktor Brack, Waldemar Hoven, and Kurt Blome. Brandt, Brack, and Hoven were convicted, sentenced to death, and executed; Blome was acquitted.

There was a euthanasia trial held in the Soviet occupation zone in Dresden in June 1947 to prosecute those who had worked at the Sonnenstein killing centre in Pirna. There were 15 defendants, including Paul Nitsche, the director of the T4 Medical Office (German: Medizinische Abteilung). Four of the defendants, including Nitsche, were sentenced to death and executed.

== Hadamar trial (1945) ==
The U.S. Hadamar trial, officially titled U.S. v. Alfons Klein et al., was held between 8 and 15 October 1945. The defendants were former workers at the Hadamar killing center in Hadamar, Hesse-Nassau. Hadamar was the site of a mental hospital before World War II began in Europe in 1939. Starting in September 1939, the facilities served both as a mental hospital and as a hospital for German soldiers and POWs. At the end of 1940, Hadamar was selected to replace the Grafeneck killing centre, which was closed in December 1940. Over the next nine months at least 10,000 mentally disabled Germans were murdered with gas at Hadamar. The "euthanasia" killings of mental patients temporarily stopped in August 1941, and the gas chambers were dismantled. Murders of the mentally disabled resumed in August 1942 with an estimated 3,000 to 3,500 additional victims, though now narcotic overdoses were used instead of gassing. At this time, the staff at Hadamar began murdering mentally disabled German children and healthy half-Jewish children (German: Mischlingkinder); the facility also began killing concentration camp prisoners as part of Action 14f13. In the summer of 1944 Hadamar was also used to murder hundreds of conscripted Polish and Russian workers who had tuberculosis. It was occupied by American troops on 26 March 1945.

Although five different groups were killed at Hadamar over the course of the war, the U.S. military was not allowed to try many of the defendants. Prior to a charter by the Nuremberg trials, which introduced crimes against humanity as a charge, they were not allowed to prosecute Hadamar personnel for murdering German citizens.

However, officials found a loophole, and instead sought to prosecute multiple suspects for murdering 476 sick Polish and Russian workers, who were considered Allied nationals. The seven defendants in the trial were Alfons Klein, Adolf Wahlmann, Heinrich Ruoff, Karl Willig, Irmgard Huber, Philipp Blum, and Adolf Merkle. Klein, Ruoff, and Willig were sentenced to death and hanged one by one at a prison in Bruchsal on 14 March 1946. Wahlmann was sentenced to life in prison with hard labour due to his old age (he was nearly 70) and poor health. The other three defendants were sentenced to hard labour terms ranging from 25 years to 35 years.

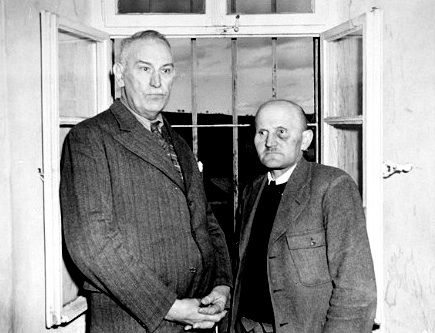
Adolf Wahlmann (left), chief physician, and Karl Willig (right), Hadamar 1945

Defendant	Position at Hadamar Euthanasia Center	Sentence
Alfons Klein	Director	Death by hanging, executed on 14 March 1946
Adolf Wahlmann	Chief doctor	Life imprisonment with hard labor, reduced to 12 years. Wahlmann was discharged from his U.S. sentence in December 1952, but remained in prison due to his life sentence from West Germany. He was released from prison on 20 October 1953, and died on 1 November 1956.
Heinrich Ruoff	Head male nurse	Death by hanging, executed on 14 March 1946
Karl Willig	Ward male nurse	Death by hanging, executed on 14 March 1946
Irmgard Huber	Head female nurse	25 years imprisonment with hard labor, commuted to 12 years, released in July 1953, and died in 1983.
Philipp Blum	Cemetery attendant	30 years imprisonment with hard labor, reduced to 15 years, paroled on 11 February 1954, discharged from parole on 9 July 1957
Adolf Merkle	Registrar and bookkeeper	35 years imprisonment with hard labor, reduced to time served and released in March 1950

== Nuremberg trials ==
=== International Military Tribunal (1945–1946) ===
At the International Military Tribunal at the Nuremberg Palace of Justice, one of the crimes charged was the euthanasia program. Reich Minister of the Interior Wilhelm Frick was sentenced to death for, among other charges, his responsibility for the deaths of 275,000 disabled patients under the banner of the euthanasia program. Frick's death sentence was carried out on 16 October 1946 alongside nine others passed down by the tribunal.

=== Doctors' Trial (1946–1947) ===
The Nuremberg Doctors' Trial took place from 9 December 1946 to 20 August 1947 at the Nuremberg Palace of Justice before an American military court. Its primary purpose was to prosecute Nazi doctors for their involvement in torturous medical experiments performed in German concentration camps during the war; prosecuting those who had participated in the euthanasia programme was of secondary importance to the Americans. Thus, only four of the 23 defendants were charged with murdering the mentally ill as part of the euthanasia programme: Karl Brandt, Viktor Brack, Waldemar Hoven, and Kurt Blome. All of them except for Blome were convicted and executed.

In the Doctors' Trial, as in the 1945 Hadamar trial, the American prosecution insisted that euthanasia was an offense against international law, not a targeted campaign to purge German society of "unworthy life." This allowed the United States to convict Brandt and the others for their participation in the euthanasia programme without comprising its national sovereignty. The U.S. was able to do so by claiming that the purpose of euthanasia was to free up resources for Germany's war machine, thus making euthanasia a war crime that aided Nazi Germany's illegal campaign of aggressive war.

==== Background ====
The Doctors' Trial took place after the first International Military Tribunal (IMT). In January 1946, Telford Taylor, the U.S. Chief of Counsel for War Crimes, began planning to hold a second IMT to try German industrialists and financiers in the U.S. zone of occupation, but reconsidered when he realized the Russians would insist on holding the trial in the Russian zone of occupation, presided over by a Soviet judge. Since a trial held under such circumstances would be politically unpopular in the United States, Taylor instead decided in August 1946 to hold a trial based on criminal experiments on concentration camp prisoners. This decision was based on evidence uncovered during the IMT trial of Hermann Göring that showed that Luftwaffe doctors had performed cruel experiments on these prisoners, as well as Wolfram Sievers' admission at the IMT that there was a Jewish skull collection" consisting of bones from murdered Jewish concentration camp prisoners. In May 1946, when Taylor was still considering holding a second IMT, his office tasked James McHaney with heading an investigative group to gather evidence about SS and German health care leaders. McHaney's group found much evidence of medical crimes, in addition to the evidence already assembled by the IMT prosecution team. The abundant evidence, combined with the fact that a number of leaders responsible for these medical crimes were in American and British custody, led Taylor to think that it would be easy to try and convict these individuals.

==== Trial of Karl Brandt ====
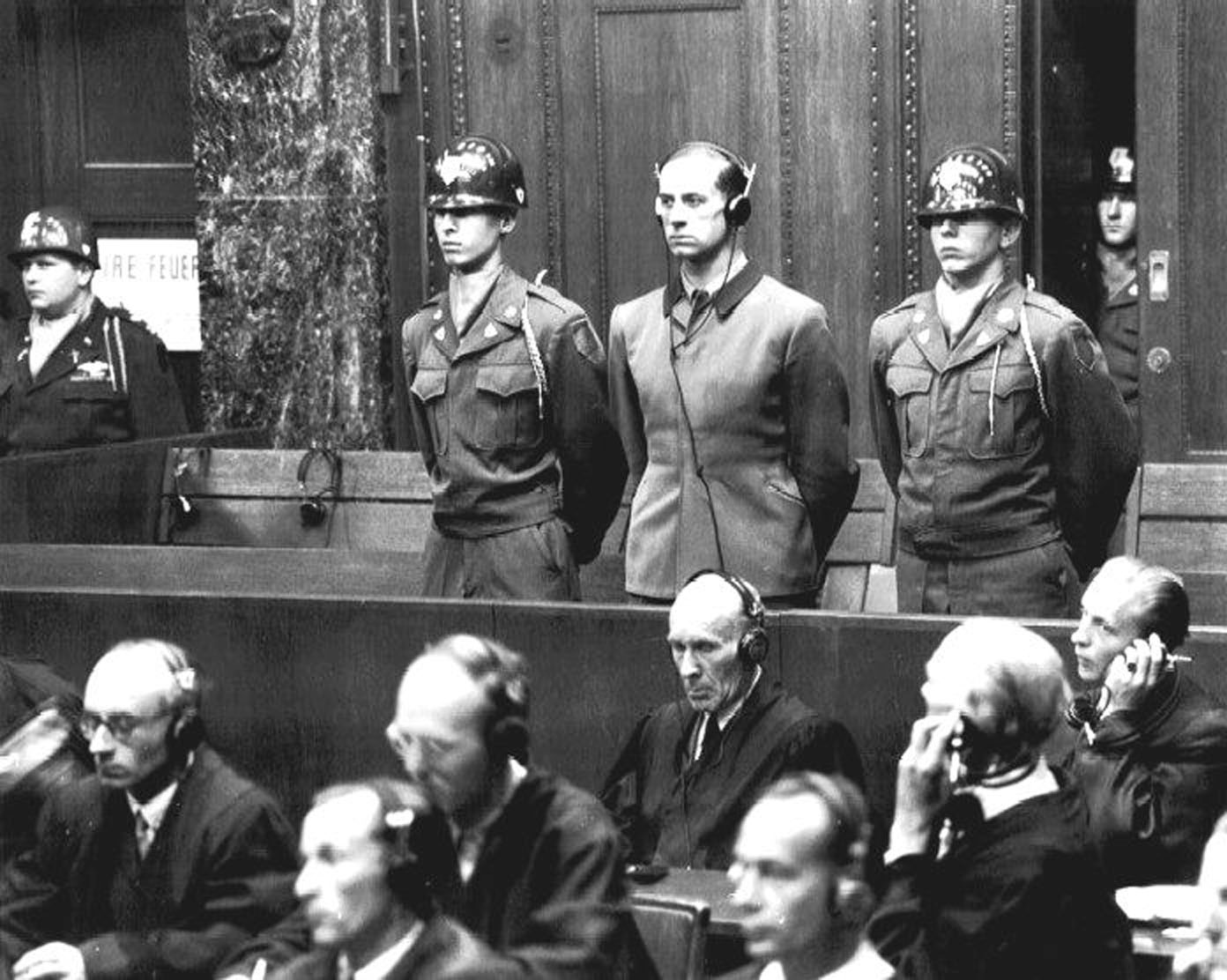
Karl Brandt at the sentencing in the Nuremberg Doctors' Trial

Brandt was the highest-ranking defendant indicted in the Doctors' Trial. He was an inviting target for the American prosecution because of his personal relationship with Hitler, his leading role in the euthanasia programme, and his role in medical experiments at Dachau concentration camp. In 1938, he and Philipp Bouhler had been commissioned by Hitler to run the children's euthanasia programme; in 1939, Hitler gave the two of them the task of organizing and running the adult euthanasia programme as well. (Philipp Bouhler, head of Hitler's Chancellery (German: Kanzlei des Führers or KdF), was not indicted in the Doctors' Trial because he had committed suicide in May 1945.) Brandt claimed that he was a humanitarian idealist who participated in the euthanasia programme because he wanted to relieve the suffering of terminally ill patients. He also claimed that he had nothing to do with killing the mentally disabled after the euthanasia programme officially ended in August 1941. The American prosecution did not agree with Brandt that euthanasia was a "humanitarian measure," and even he admitted that the primary motivation behind the second or "wild" phase of euthanasia was economic rather than humanitarian; according to Brandt, this economic rationale was to kill "useless eaters" in order to conserve food and medical resources for the German military.

==== Trial of Victor Brack ====
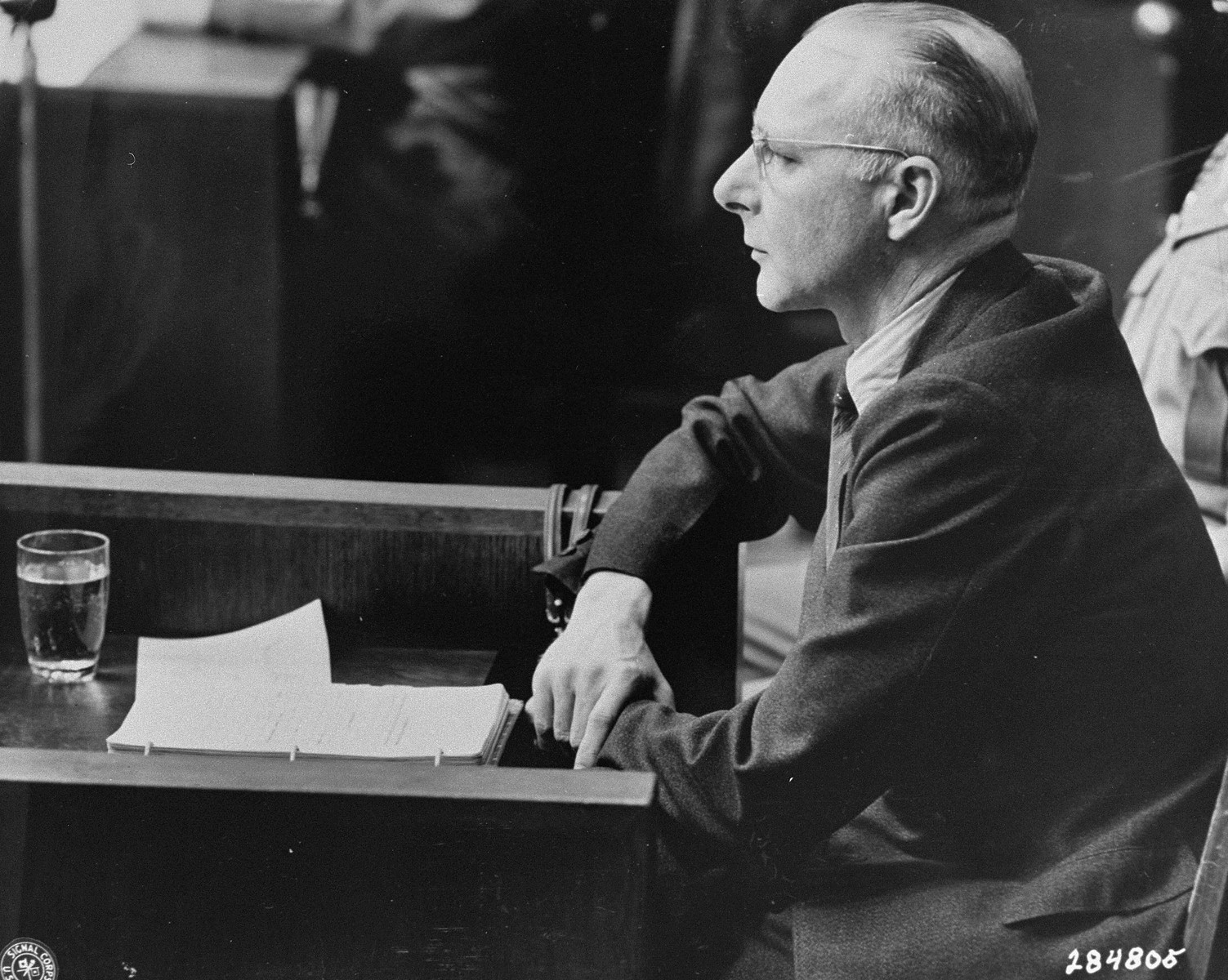
Viktor Brack testifies in his own defense at the Doctors' Trial in Nuremberg in 1947

Victor Brack was Bouhler's deputy in Hitler's Chancellery, and as such he played a major role in organizing the euthanasia programme in 1939 and the Final Solution (German: die Endlösung) in 1941. Unlike in the 1945 Hadamar trial, in Brack's case the American prosecutors were interested in the links between the euthanasia programme and the Nazis' attempts to exterminate other groups they deemed "unworthy of life." In Brack's pre-trial questioning, the American interrogators disputed his claim that the euthanasia programme ended in 1941, maintaining that it was just a "general test" (German: Generalprobe) for the Third Reich's other, larger extermination campaigns. Brack vehemently denied that the two events were linked and claimed that Hitler did not have the Final Solution in mind when he ordered the euthanasia programme to begin in 1939. The main disagreement between Brack and his interrogators was over the motive behind Nazi euthanasia. Brack claimed that it was to give "incurable" cases a "mercy death"; his interrogators maintained that it was undertaken for economic reasons, to free up medical resources for the Germany army as it waged aggressive war, as well as to test killing methods and psychologically harden personnel for other mass murders.

Brack and his lawyer attempted to use the "collision of duties" defense (German: Pflichtkollision), also called the "sabotage" theory of criminal wrongdoing, to prove his innocence. Since he could not deny that he had taken part in the euthanasia programme, he argued that he committed the crime of helping to murder some disabled Germans and Jews in order to prevent even more from being murdered. That is, he claimed his involvement in euthanasia and the Final Solution was a cover so that he could secretly sabotage it from within. In the end, his efforts to invoke a sabotage defense could not overcome the incriminating evidence against him, which proved that he had assigned euthanasia personnel from the T4 programme to Operation Reinhard (the annihilation of Poland's Jews) and that he had volunteered to provide gas vans to murder Jews incapable of work.

==== Trial of Kurt Blome ====
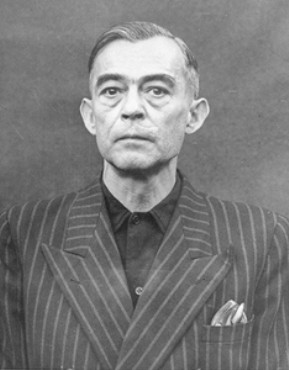
Blome as defendant in the Doctors' Trial, Nuremberg

It may well be that defendant Blome was preparing to experiment on human beings in connection with bacteriological warfare, but the record fails to disclose that fact, or that he ever actually conducted the experiments.

Kurt Blome was the deputy surgeon general of the Third Reich and was in charge of Germany's biological weapons programme. He was arrested by American troops in Munich on 17 May 1945. The U.S. Chemical Warfare Service, the agency in charge of the U.S. biological weapons programme, saw great value in appropriating the expertise of Nazi scientists and using it for their own purposes. As Hitler's top biological weapons expert, Blome was seen as the most important Nazi scientist for the Chemical Warfare Service to interrogate. They wanted to include him in Operation Paperclip, a secret postwar U.S. project that brought hundreds of Nazi scientists to America so that they could continue their military research for the U.S. government. However, this plan had to be abandoned, or at least postponed, when the Soviets unexpectedly announced on 12 August 1946 that Walter Schreiber, the former surgeon general of the Third Reich, was going to testify against the defendants at the International Military Tribunal, which he did on 26 August 1946. Much of his testimony focused on Kurt Blome and his research on the plague, even though Blome was not on trial. Schreiber claimed that Blome had engaged in torturous human medical experiments during the war.

As a result of Schreiber's unusual testimony, Blome was arrested and sent to the prison complex at the Nuremberg Palace of Justice on 28 August 1946. He was no longer being considered for Operation Paperclip, as he was now going to be a defendant in the upcoming Doctors' Trial, which began on 9 December 1946. Although Blome had been in charge of Germany's biological weapons programme, that was not in itself a crime. However, the prosecution had many documents in which Blome repeatedly discussed his plans to conduct plague research on human beings. In his defense, Blome argued that he had intended to experiment on human beings but never actually did so. The prosecution could not find any witnesses to testify against Blome, a fact that he used to argue his innocence.

Additionally, Blome's wife Bettina researched experiments conducted by the U.S. Office of Scientific Research and Development (OSRD) during the war, including malaria experiments on prisoners at Terre Haute. The defense counsel Robert Servatius found an article from Life magazine from June 1945 that described experiments performed by the OSRD on 800 U.S. prisoners during the war. Servatius read the entire article in the courtroom. Because it discussed U.S. Army experimentation on prisoners, it significantly weakened the prosecution's case, as it made them look like hypocrites; they were prosecuting German doctors for involvement in the same kinds of experiments American doctors were engaged in. The Nuremberg judges made this statement about Blome's acquittal: "It may well be that defendant Blome was preparing to experiment on human beings in connection with bacteriological warfare, but the record fails to disclose that fact, or that he ever actually conducted the experiments."

==== Verdict ====
The U.S. military tribunal hearing the case accepted the prosecution's theory that euthanasia was motivated by economic, political, and racial concerns. It agreed with the prosecution that Nazi euthanasia was designed to get rid of "useless eaters" in order to conserve food and medical resources for the German military. It held that the euthanasia programme initially only targeted the mentally disabled but gradually expanded to the Jews and concentration camp prisoners, and that this expansion to include other groups occurred during the second or "wild" phase of euthanasia. The tribunal found Brandt, Brack, and Hoven guilty of war crimes and crimes against humanity under Control Council Law #10 and sentenced them to death by hanging. Their appeals against their sentence were unsuccessful, and they were all hanged one by one on 2 June 1948, at Landsberg Prison in Bavaria.

== Frankfurt trials (1946–1948) ==
There were four trials at the Frankfurt high court between 1946 und 1948 for people involved in the Nazi euthanasia programme. Amongst the 44 defendants were doctors, nursing sisters and male nurses from the Hadamar, Eichberg and Kalmenhof institutions who had been involved in the killing of patients. Six death sentences were passed and 19 were given prison sentences. In the end, the death sentences were not carried out and all but two of those convicted were pardoned.

== Dresden trial (1947) ==
The Dresden trial took place in the Soviet occupation zone to prosecute those who had worked at the Sonnenstein Euthanasia Centre in Pirna. Paul Nitsche, the director of the T4 Medical Office (German: Medizinische Abteilung), was one of the 15 defendants.

The Dresden state attorney presented the indictment against the defendants on 7 January 1947. They included Dr. Paul Nitsche, Dr. Alfred Schulz, Dr. Günther Langer, Dr. Robert Herzer, Dr. Emil Eichler, and Dr. Ernst Leonhardt; the nurses Hermann Felfe, Erhardt Gäbler, Paul Räpke, Elsa Sachse, and Marie-Luise Pusclimann. The trial was originally supposed to begin in February 1947 but was pushed back to summer 1947. The Dresden trial ran from 16 to 25 June 1947 and was held in public. The trial attracted considerable attention due to the presence of the media and the Saxon newspaper, Sächsische Zeitung reported the proceedings daily.

Nitsche, Leonhardt, Felfe and Gäbler were sentenced to death on 20 December 1945. Räpke received a life sentence, Herzer 20 years, Dr. Langer and Sachse 15 years, and Wedel and Ackremann eight years. Puschmann and Fridrich were each sentenced to three years imprisonment. Dr. Walther, Dr. Schulze, and Martha Friedrich were acquitted. Leonhardt and Felfe both committed suicide before they could be executed, Leonhardt on 8 July 1947, and Felfe on 15 October 1947. Nitsche and Gäbler were both guillotined at a prison in Dresden on 25 March 1948.

== Grafeneck trial (1949) ==
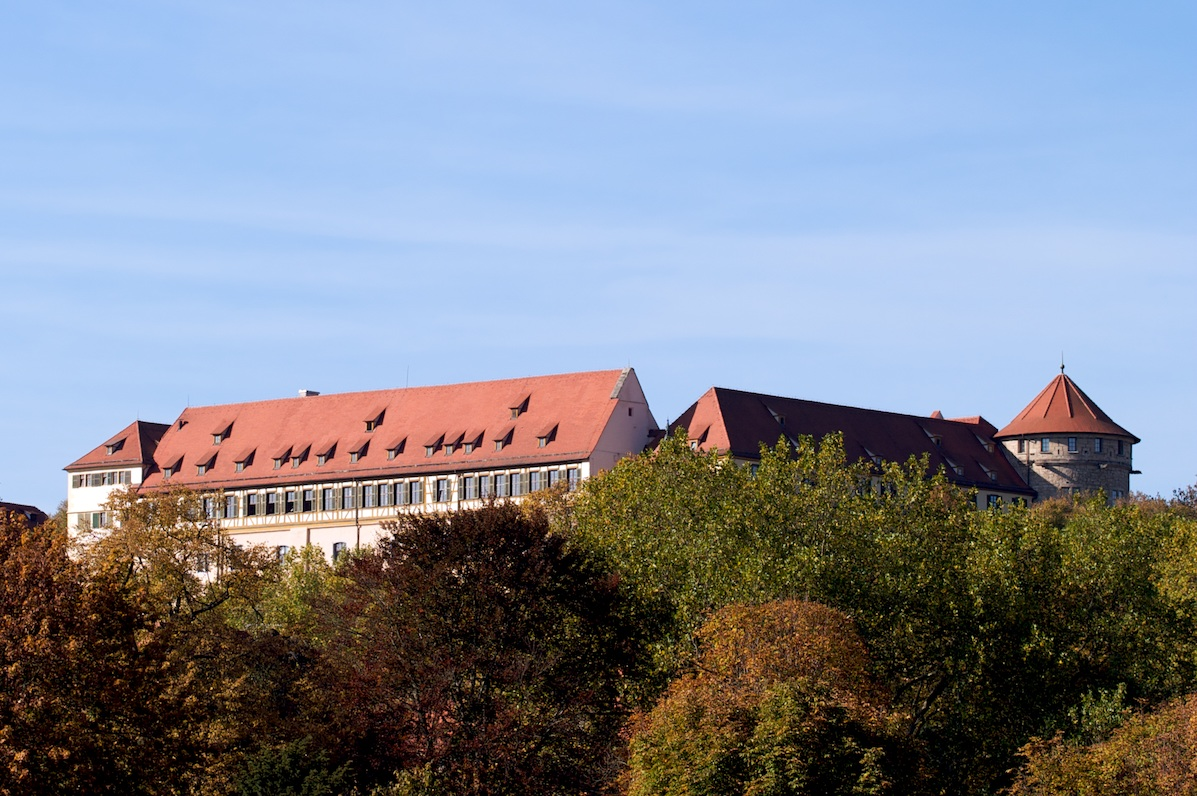
The proceedings of the Grafeneck trial took place in Hohentübingen Castle

After several years of preparation the Grafeneck trial began in summer 1949 at Hohentübingen Castle. Eight defendants were accused of participating in the murder of over 10,000 patients at the Grafeneck Euthanasia Centre. The accused were: Otto Mauthe, Max Eyrich (former state youth doctor), Alfons Stegmann (former doctor in the Zwiefalten Sanatorium), Meta Fauser (senior female doctor at Zwiefalten), Jakob Wöger and Hermann Holzschuh (official at the registry office), Heinrich Unvertau (former nurse) and nursing sister, Maria Appinger.

== Hartheim trial ==
=== Defendants ===
The main Hartheim trial tried 61 defendants, including medical directors, Georg Renno and Rudolf Lonauer. The following table breaks the defendants down by function and gender:

	Male	Female	Total
Doctors	3	0	3
Nursing staff	15	8	23
Managerial staff	9	7	16
Drivers	4	0	4
"Stokers"	6	0	6
Unknown	6	3	9
Totals	43	18	61

=== Proceedings ===
The case against 13 of the accused was withdrawn, and the trial was adjourned for 22 defendants because they could not be found. Charges were also dropped against seven defendants who had died. Two accused were given prison sentences, the case against 13 more was taken forward into another trial and the fate of the remaining three is still unknown.

=== Sentencing ===
Sentence was passed on 7 July 1947. The state prosecution had sought the death sentence in 11 cases, but only four were passed. The sentences on the nursing sisters were generally more lenient than had been asked for. The death sentences were carried out in March 1948 in Dresden. Those with long prison sentences were released in 1956 as part of an amnesty.

== Klagenfurt trial ==
The Austrian psychiatrist and senior doctor in the Klagenfurt euthanasia programme, Franz Niedermoser, was brought to trial before the Klagenfurt Division of the Graz People's Court. He was found guilty of having ordered the killing of at least 400 patients. In addition he was accused of the forced mistreatment of patients, with complete disregard for human dignity, often leading to the death of the victims. Niedermoser was sentenced to death by hanging on 4 April 1946 and his property confiscated. The sentence was carried out on 24 October 1946 in the Klagenfurt State Court. Head nurse, Eduard Brandstätter, head sister, Antonie Pachner, and head nurse, Otillie Schellander, who were accomplices, were also sentenced to death by hanging. On the day of his sentencing, Brandstätter committed suicide. Pachner and Schellander had their sentences commuted to long gaol terms. On 8 April 1951 Antonie Pachner died in prison, but Schellander was released as part of a further pardon on 1 April 1955. Nurses Paula Tomasch, Julie Wolf, Ilse Printschler and Maria Cholawa as well as a head nurse, who were all involved in the torture of patients, were given long gaol sentences, some in combination with financial penalties.

== Literature ==
- Joachim S. Hohmann: Der Euthanasie-Prozeß von Dresden 1947. Eine zeitgeschichtliche Dokumentation. Lang, Frankfurt a.M., 1993.
