= Waldemar Hoven =

Nazi German physician and war criminal (1903–1948)

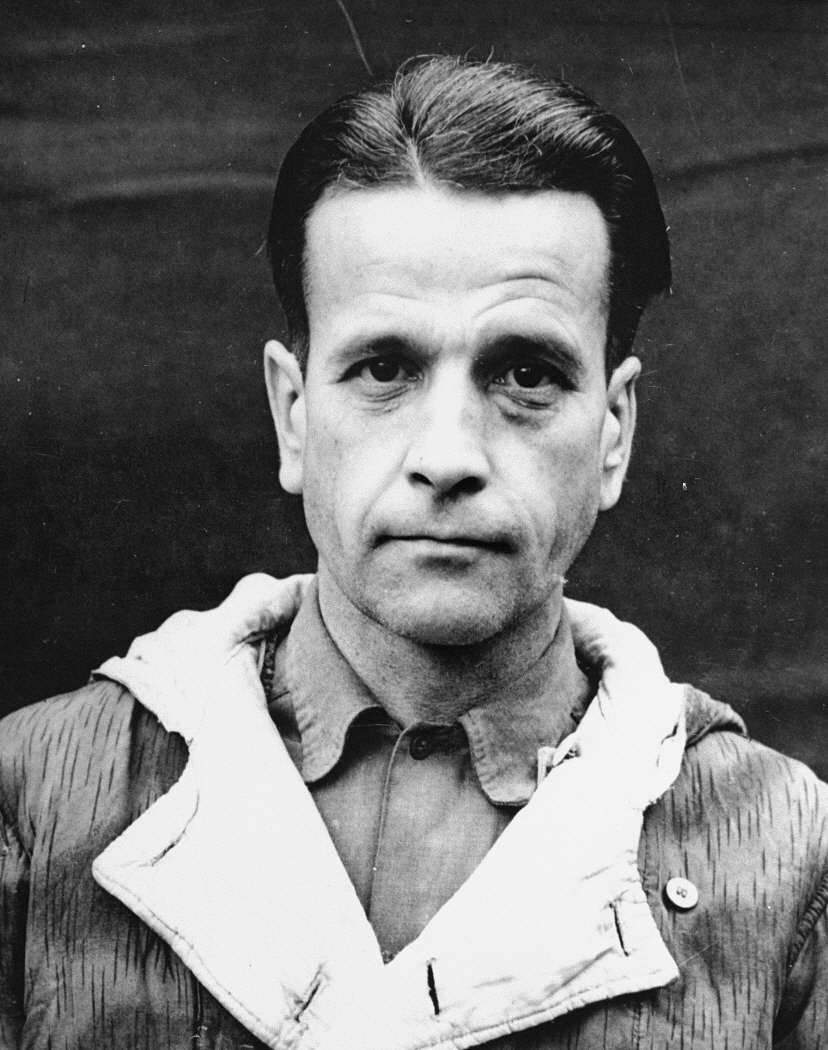
- Hoven in U.S. custody
- Born: 10 February 1903; Freiburg, Grand Duchy of Baden, German Empire
- Died: 2 June 1948 (aged 45); Landsberg Prison, Allied-occupied Germany
- Occupation: Physician
- Political party: Nazi Party
- Status: Executed by hanging
- Motive: Nazism
- Convictions: War crimes Crimes against humanity Membership in a criminal organization
- Trial: Doctors' Trial
- Penalty: Death

Details
- Victims: Thousands
- Span of crimes: 1940 – 12 September 1943
- Country: Nazi Germany
- Location: Buchenwald concentration camp

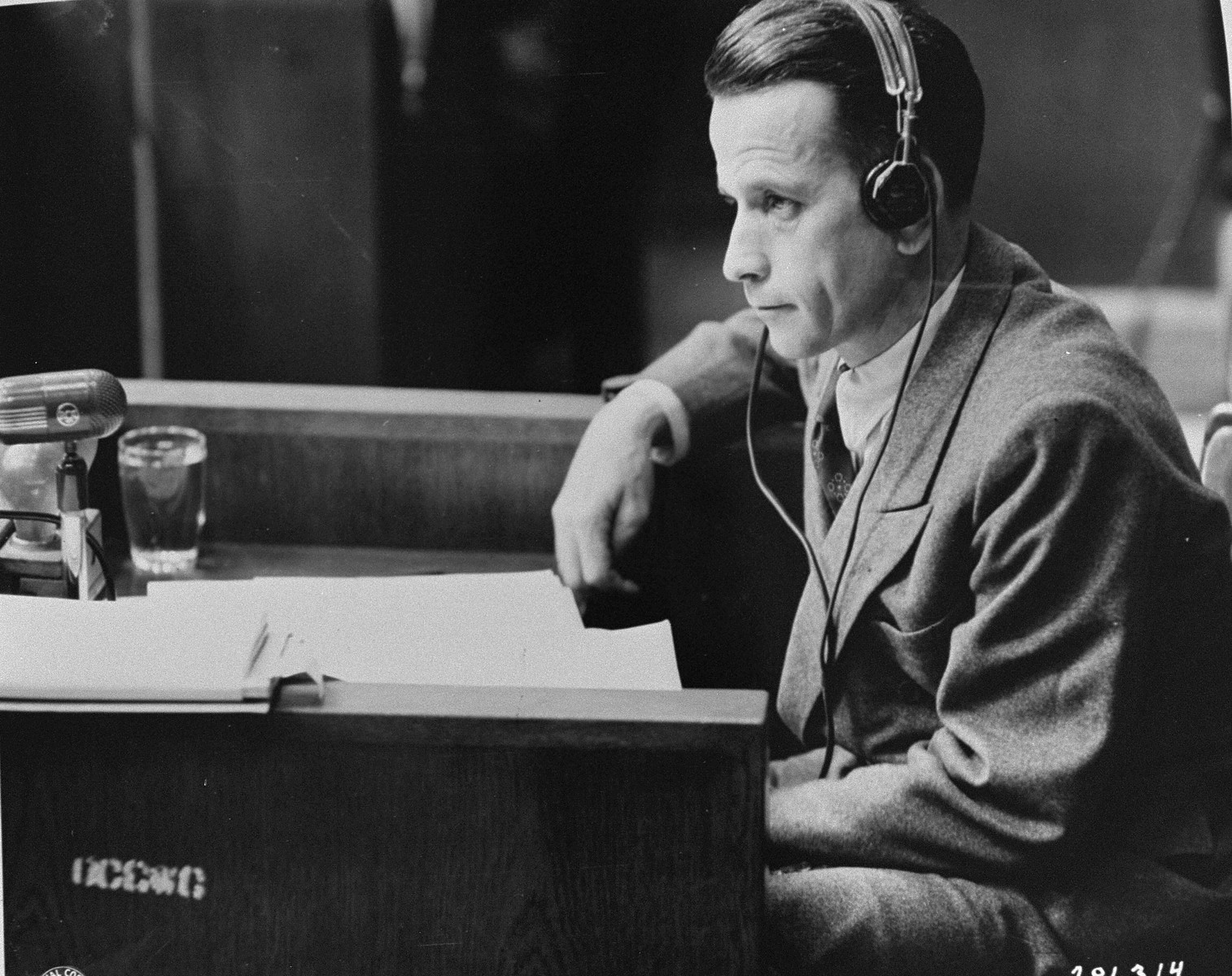
Hoven testifying during the Doctors' Trial

Waldemar Hoven (10 February 1903 – 2 June 1948) was a Nazi physician at Buchenwald concentration camp, and convicted war criminal for conducting human experiments regarding typhus which led to the deaths of many concentration camp prisoners, and as one of the organizers of the euthanasia program Aktion T4; this Nazi initiative resulted in the systematic murder of 275,000 to 300,000 disabled people. He was sentenced to death and hanged on 2 June 1948.

== Early life and Nazi Party membership ==
Hoven was born in Freiburg, Baden, Germany. Between 1919 and 1921, Hoven visited Denmark and Sweden to study agriculture. In the 1920s, he visited the United States, where he worked as a movie extra in Hollywood. In the 1930s, Hoven went to Paris, where he had an affair with an American woman who gave him an extremely valuable gold cigarette case. Hoven finally returned home to Freiburg in 1933, where he completed his high school studies. He then attended the Universities of Freiburg and Munich. In 1934, he joined the SS. In 1939, he concluded his medical studies and became a physician for the SS. Hoven rose to the rank of Hauptsturmführer (Captain) in the Waffen SS.

== War crimes ==
After completing his basic training in the Waffen SS, he became assistant medical officer in the Buchenwald concentration camp and held this position until 1941; in January 1941 he became the second camp doctor of Buchenwald, and became chief camp physician at least as early as June 1942.

Hoven was involved in the administration of medical experiments regarding typhus and the tolerance of serum containing phenol, and which led to the deaths of many inmates. He was also involved in the Aktion T4 programs, during which people with disabilities were killed, along with Jewish people who were considered unfit for work. According to other prisoners, Hoven was murdering 90 to 100 prisoners every week, for a year and a half, with phenol injections.

== Arrest and release ==
He was arrested by the Nazis on 12 September 1943, accused of giving a lethal injection of phenol to Hauptscharführer Rudolf Köhler, an SS officer who was a potential witness in an investigation against Ilse Koch, with whom Hoven was rumoured to be having an affair. Hoven was charged with murder, but the case was delayed. He was released on 15 March 1945 due to the shortage of doctors.

== Doctors' Trial ==
Hoven was arrested at the end of World War II by the Allies and put on trial as a defendant at the Doctors' Trial, one of the Nuremberg Trials. He was found guilty of war crimes, crimes against humanity and membership in a criminal organization (the SS). He was sentenced to death and hanged on 2 June 1948 at Landsberg Prison in Bavaria.
