= Scheuern Foundation =

Diaconal institution for disabled people

Coordinates: 50°18′31.2″N 7°47′25.4″E

- Native name: Stiftung Scheuern
- Type: Civil law foundation
- Industry: advancement of upbringing, adult education and vocational training including assistance for students
- Founded: 1850
- Headquarters: Nassau - Scheuern, Germany
- Services: Disabled assistance
- Number of employees: approx. 1200
- Website: https://www.stiftung-scheuern.de/

The Scheuern Foundation (German: Stiftung Scheuern) is a diaconal institution for disabled people. It cares for people with intellectual disabilities, acquired brain damage, and mental illness. The Scheuern Foundation supports these groups of people with a wide range of services, from individual forms of housing, education, and training to jobs in sheltered workshops and in local companies. It also focuses on therapeutic support for people with disabilities, day and leisure activities, guest care as part of preventative care, and much more.

The Scheuern Foundation, a civil law charitable organization, is headquartered in the Scheuern district of Nassau. Along with several listed buildings located there, the foundation manages numerous other homes in the Rhine-Lahn-Westerwald region. It has approximately 1200 employees and is a member of both Diakonie Hessen and the Bundesverband Evangelische Behindertenhilfe (BeB) (Federal Association of Protestant Disability Assistance).

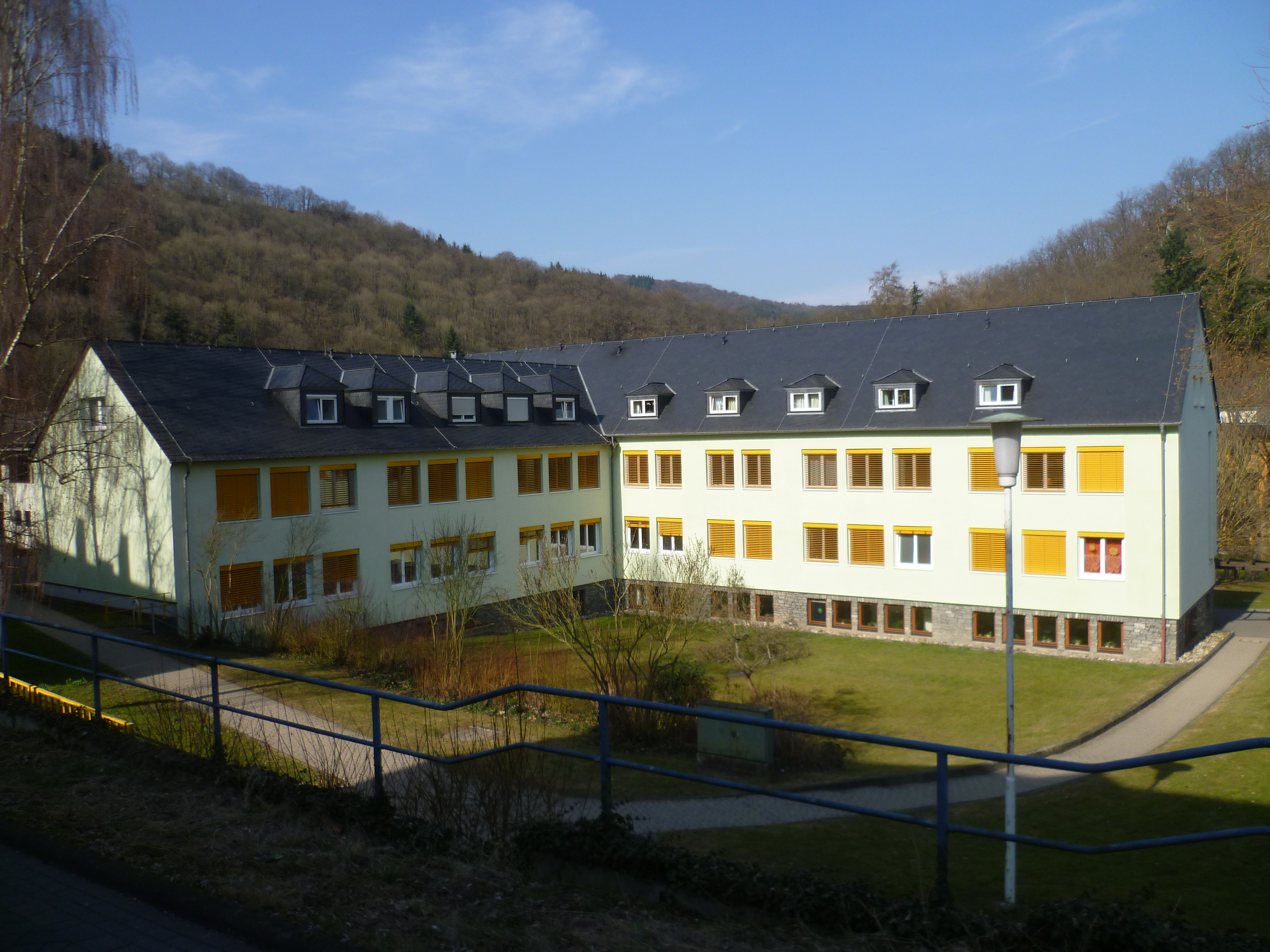
The Wichernhaus of the Scheuern Foundation

The Scheuern Foundation has a long and eventful history dating back to its establishment in 1850, with some of its buildings being significantly older. During the National Socialist era, the Scheuern Foundation was the only institution associated with the Inner Mission to serve as an intermediate institution for the Nazi killing center Hadamar, setting a precedent with its takeover. For over 1500 people, the Scheuern Foundation was the last stop before they were murdered. During this time, 153 individuals died within the facilities of the Scheuern Foundation. The post-war era until the 1980s saw a modification in the attitude towards disabled individuals in society. There was no conscious confrontation with the National Socialist past until the mid-1990s. There have been ongoing structural changes up until the present year of 2020 and beyond.

== Location and description ==
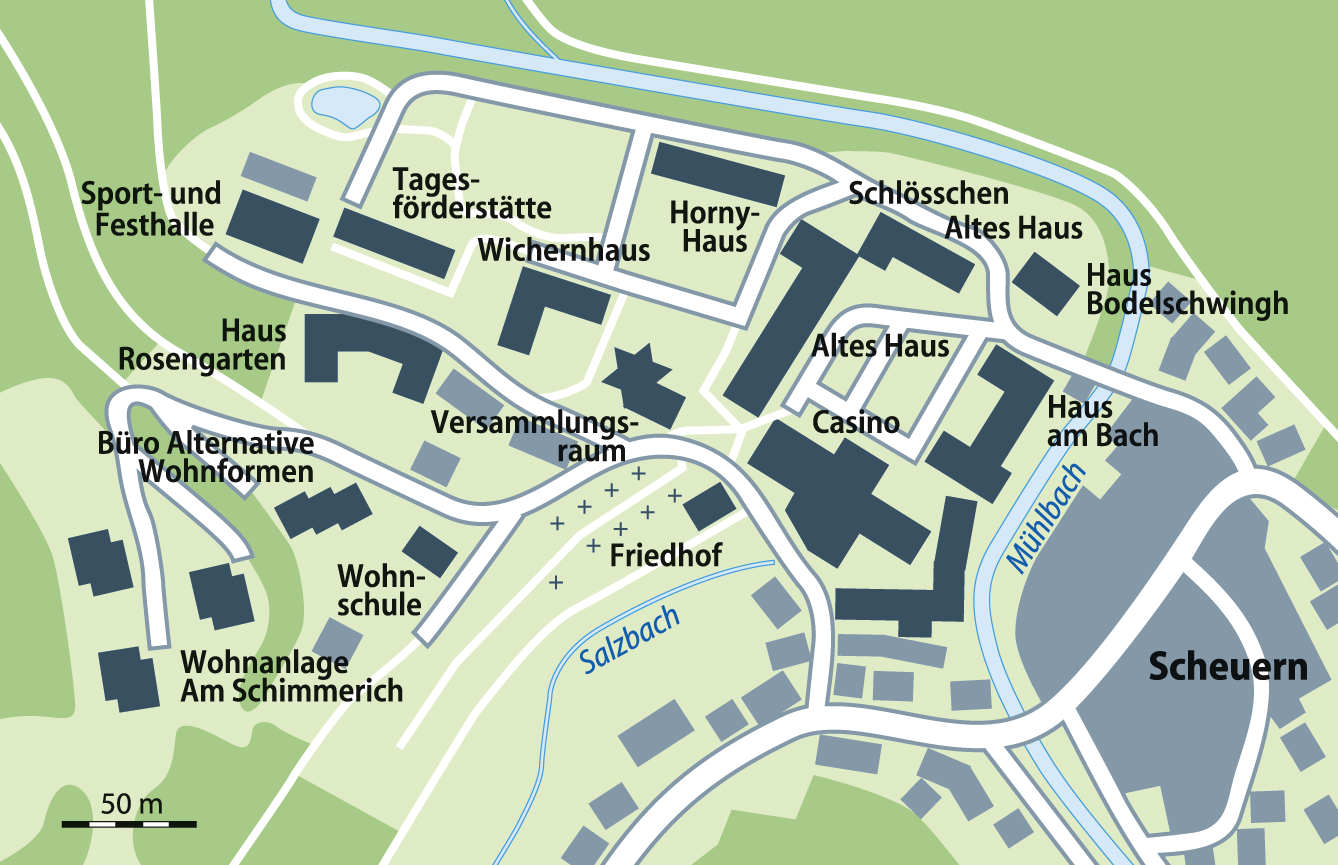
Overview of the Scheuern Foundation’s central facilities

The primary complex of the Scheuern Foundation is in the Scheuern district, adjacent to the town of Nassau in the Mühlbach valley, encompassing the surrounding forests and the Nassau Castle. Due to its size, the facility dominates the townscape of Scheuern. To the north and east, the facility's grounds are bordered by the Mühlbach river, which is accessible via a bridge. The foundation's grounds extend from a valley in the northeastern area to a ridge in the west, while Friedhofstrasse and the Am Schimmerich street border the southern perimeter of the grounds.

The central part of the complex includes several historic buildings, such as Haus am Bach, Haus Bodelschwingh, Weißen Haus, Schlösschen, Alten Haus, and the Casino (with a central kitchen). These structures are all listed buildings.

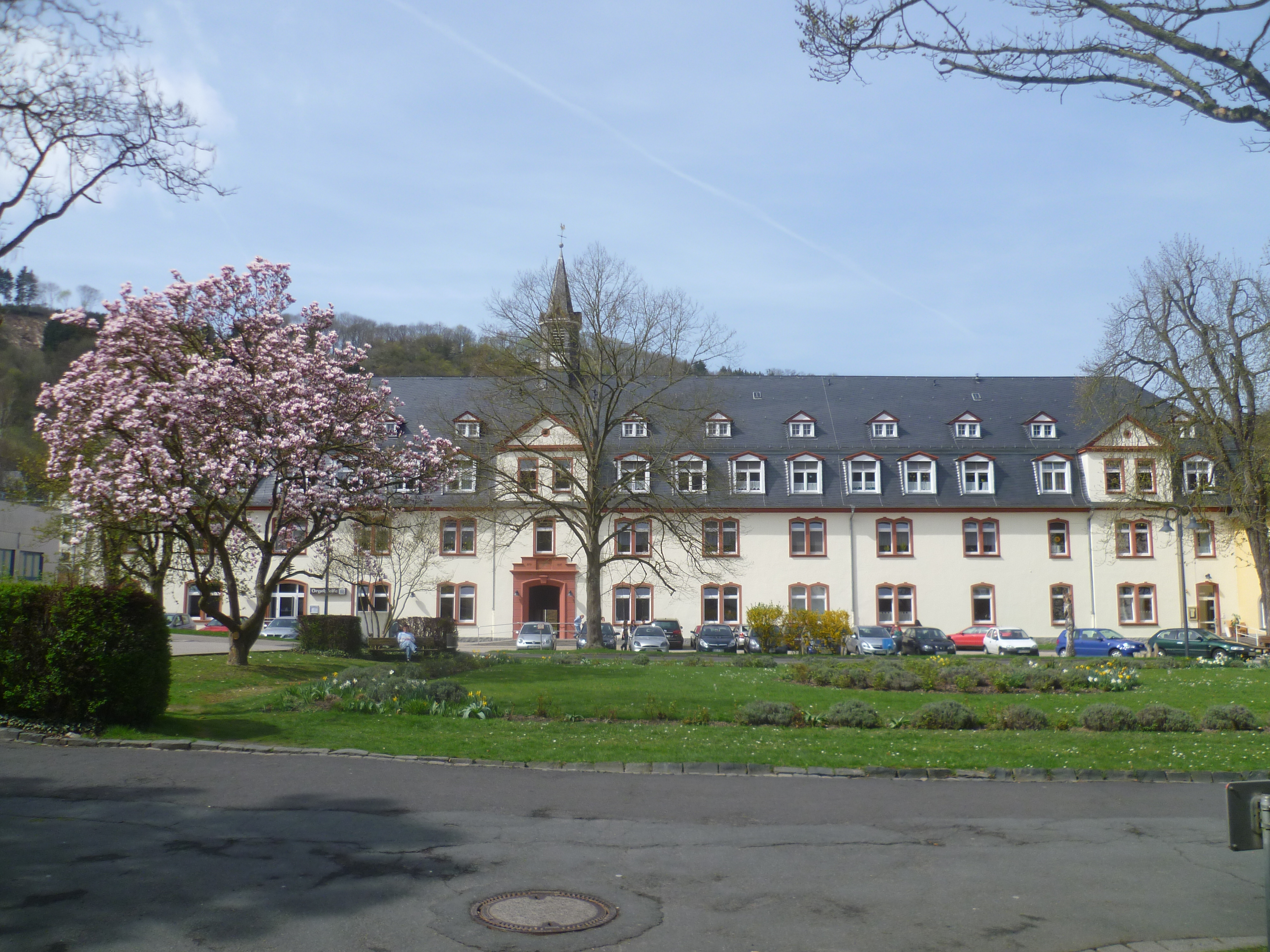
The Alte Haus is the dominant core building of the complex

Beyond the central area, the Scheuern Foundation possesses various vital components. Within Nassau, the foundation owns the Wohnheim Lahnberg, with six houses in total, alongside the Neuzebachweg house, a Gerhart-Hauptmann-street residential building in the downtown area, an orthopaedic shoe technology shop, and a workshop for individuals with disabilities in Mühlbachtal. Additionally, the foundation has another sheltered workshop in Singhofen. The Elmar-Cappi-Haus in Bad Ems operates as a residential facility for individuals with acquired brain damage and intellectual disabilities, a counselling center for those experiencing mental illness, a vocational integration service, an assembly and service centre with a print shop, and a worldshop. In Nastätten, there are two homes for disabled individuals and a worldshop. In Laurenburg, the foundation owns a residential home and a day support center. In Hillscheid the foundation manages a CAP market offering job opportunities subject to social security contributions for six people with different disabilities, amongst others. There is also the Hofgut Mauch in Misselberg, a fruit farm integrating controlled cultivation.

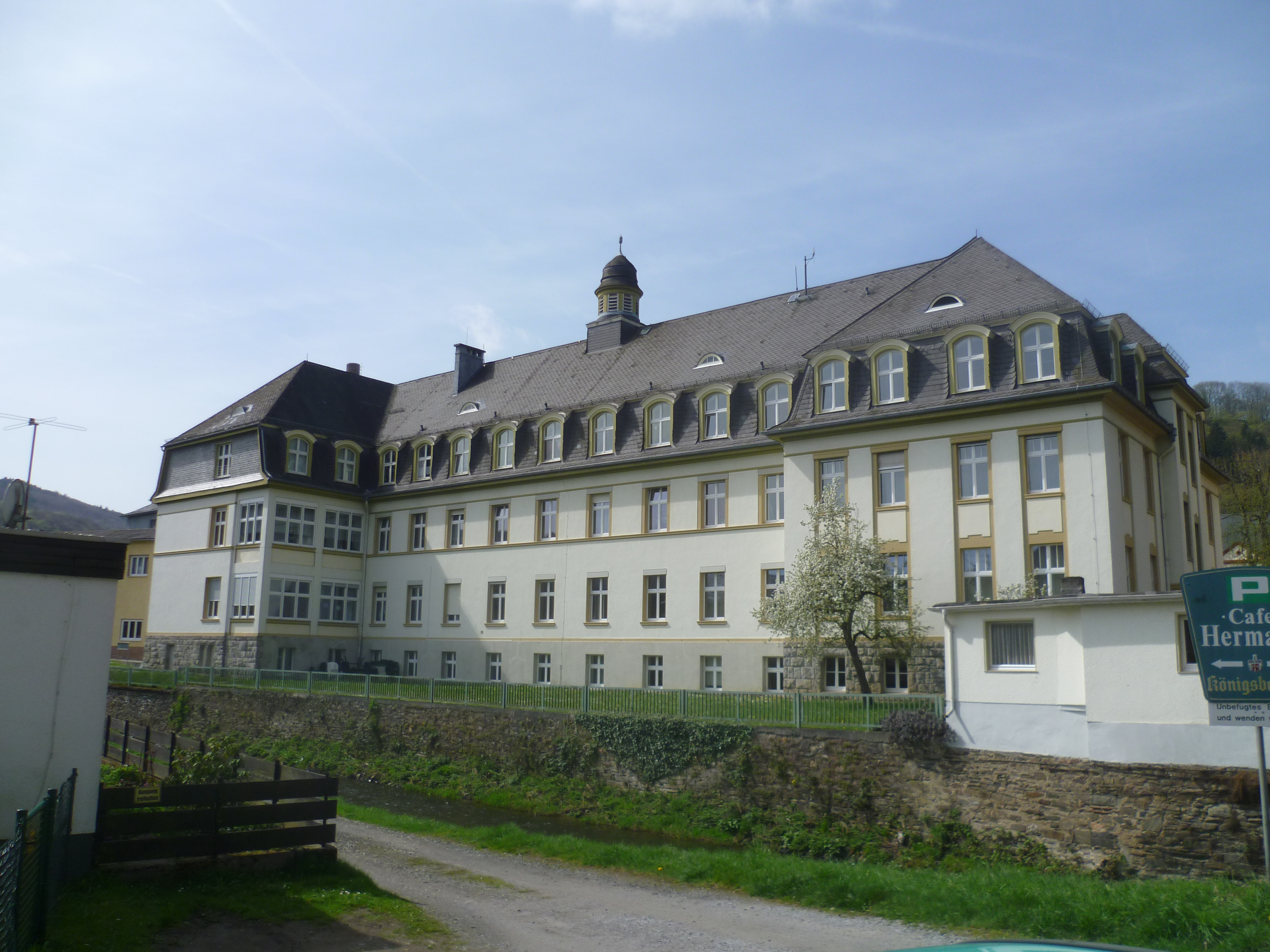
The Haus am Bach seen from the entrance to the site

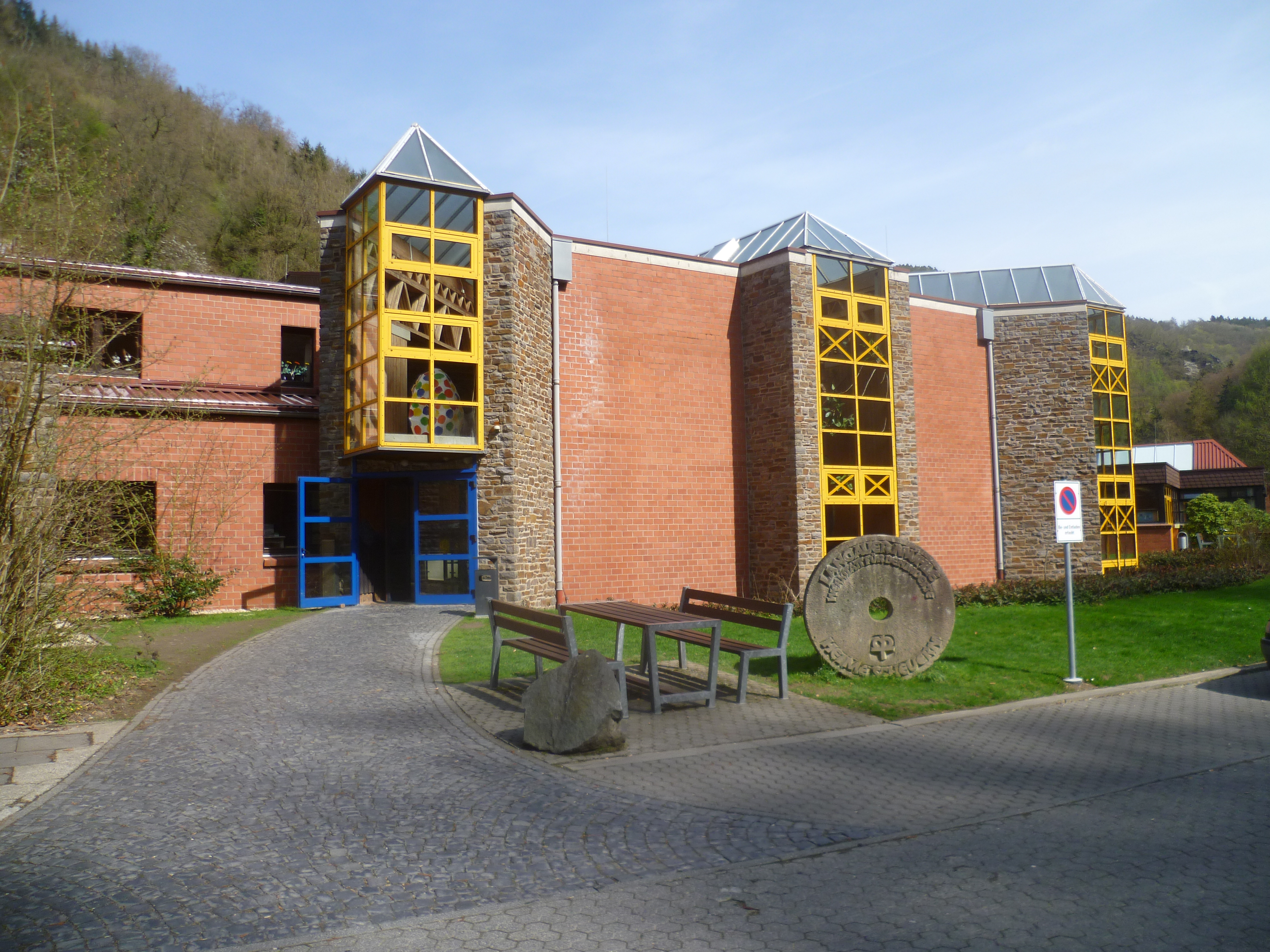
The Langauer Mühle is a workshop for disabled people

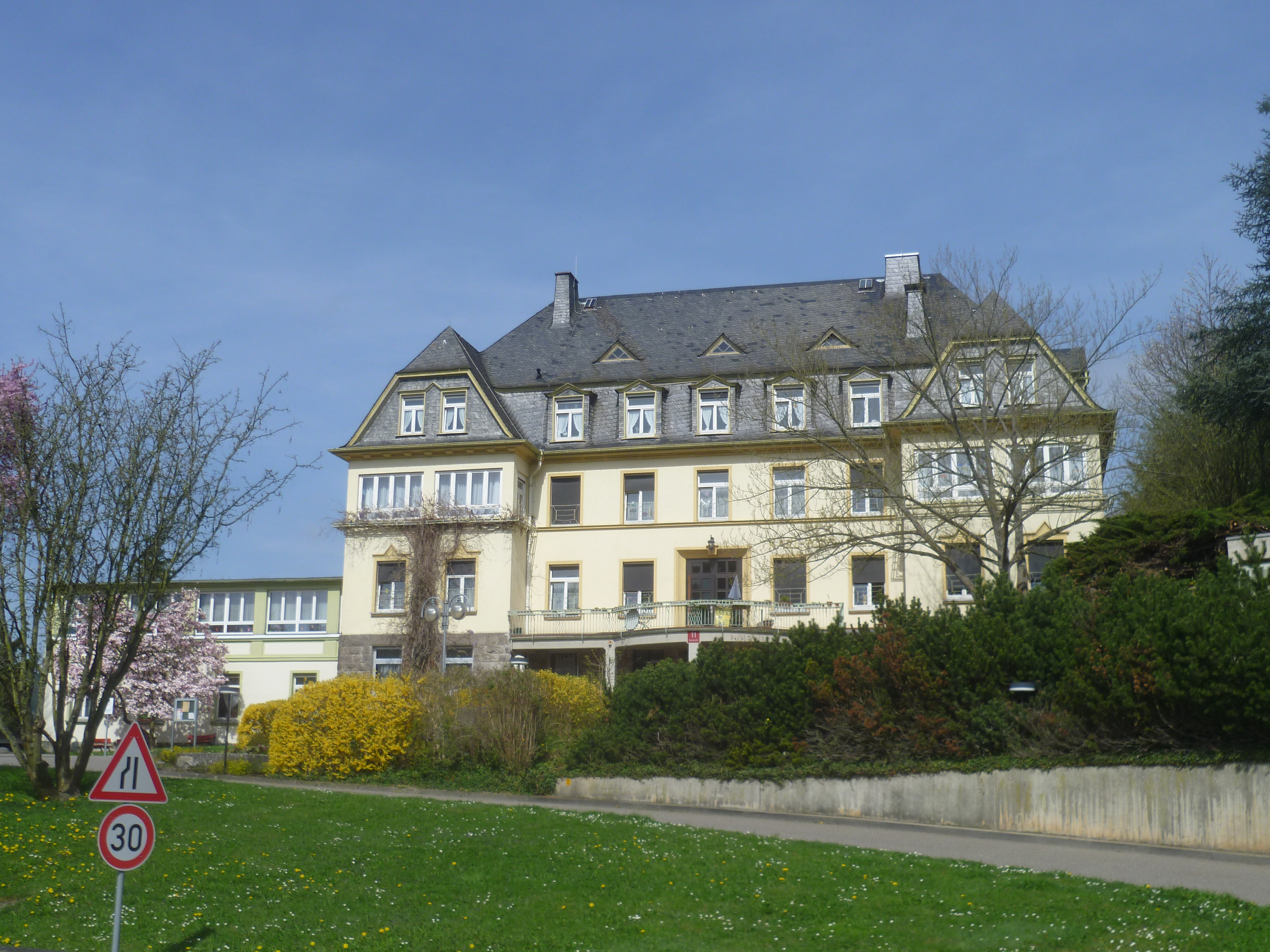
The Haus Lahnberg (until January 2012 Karl Todt House)

== Organization ==
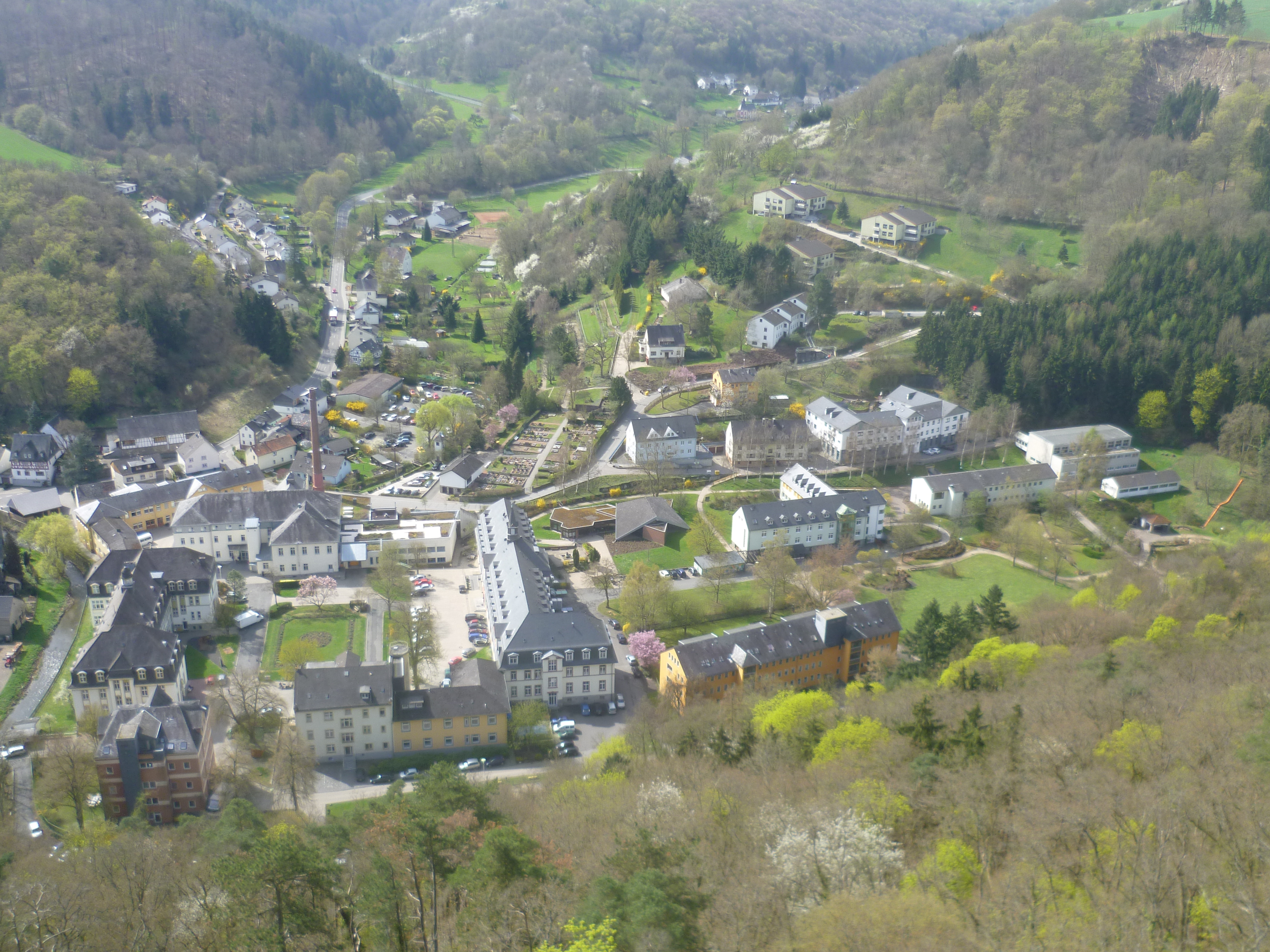
One can get an overview by looking at Nassau Castle to the north

The Scheuern Foundation is an institution for disabled people. It offers assistance, support, and encouragement based on individual needs. The procedure for designing care for people with disabilities (GBM) (Gestaltung der Betreuung von Menschen mit Behinderung) is used for quality assurance.

It is committed to enabling individuals with disabilities to actively engage in societal activities and lead self-determined lives. As a member of the Diakonisches Werk Hessen und Nassau e. V., the Federal Association of Protestant Disability Assistance, and the Federal Association of Foundations, the Scheuern Foundation offer 650 specialized residential placements. These are complemented by outpatient services like assisted living. The Langauer Mill, a workshop for individuals with disabilities, provides approximately 180 work and training opportunities. Those unable to work in a workshop due to the nature and severity of their disability are supported in the day support center.

The Werkstatt für behinderte Menschen (WfbM) (workshop for people with disabilities) within the Scheuern Foundation has been officially recognized by the state since 1977 and operates as an economically independent entity within the foundation.

Approximately 430 individuals find suitable employment across various locations in these workshops as part of their integration into the workforce. Some employees reside in the foundation's residential facilities, while others commute to work.

== History ==
=== Founded as a rescue center for homeless boys ===
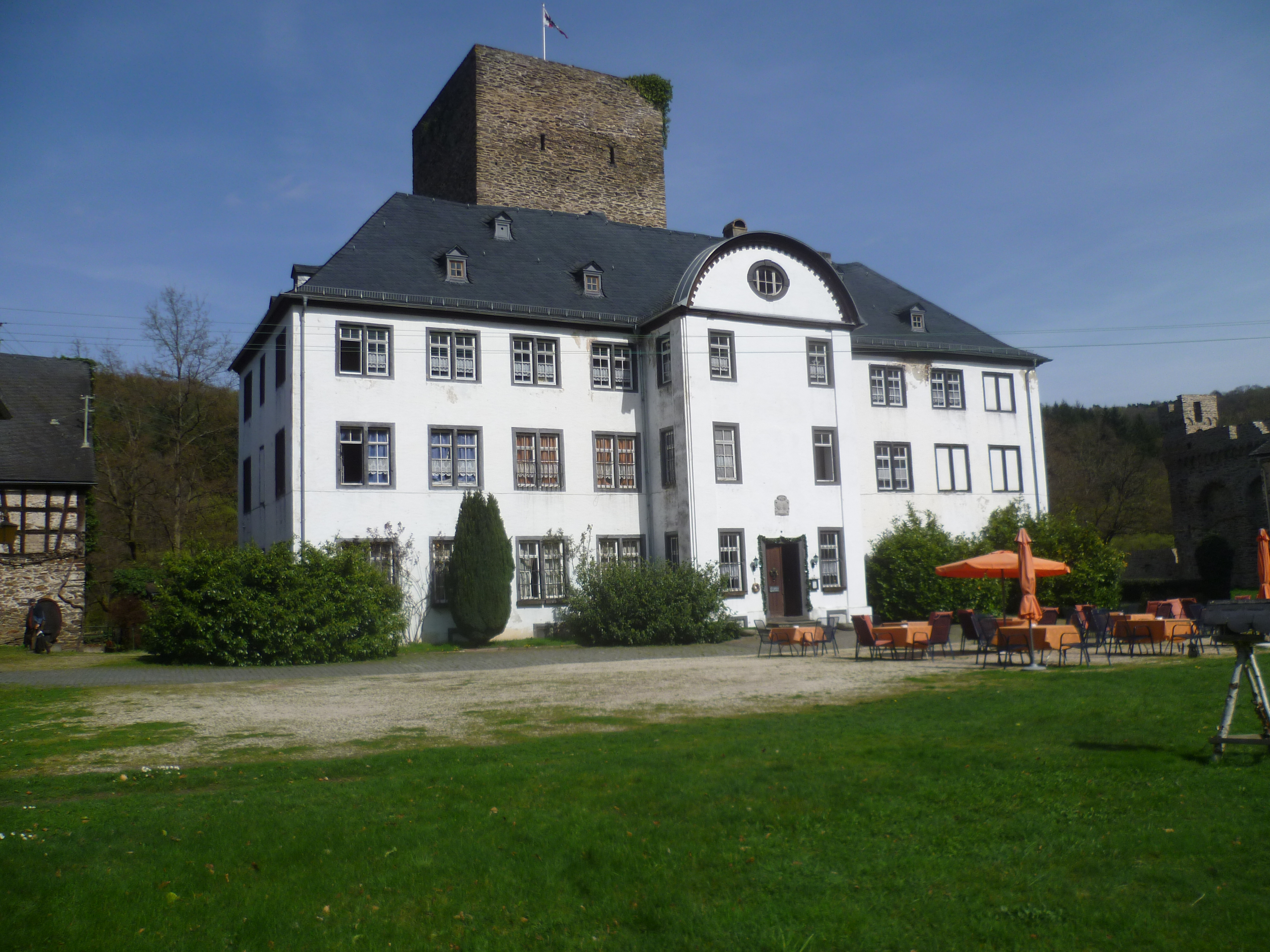
Langenau Castle, which served as a rescue center from 1851 to 1855, as it appears today

The middle of the 19th century was characterized by the social upheavals of industrialization. Traditional family relationships broke down and traditional village communities disintegrated. This breakdown left many children and youth facing poverty and homelessness. In response, several towns established rescue centers, offering these neglected boys a place to call home and guiding them toward becoming responsible citizens.

The Protestant chaplain Burchardi, teacher Reichard, and Countess Henriette von Giech, daughter of the Imperial Baron vom und zum Stein and an advocate of Burchardi's plan to establish a rescue center, were instrumental in its founding two years after the 1st Wittenberg Church Congress held in 1848. This church conference proved pivotal in the history of the Scheuern Homes. Johann Hinrich Wichern's lecture promoting the foundation of rescue homes was instrumental in inspiring Burchardi's organization of a similar home in Nassau. This lecture also led to the establishment of the Central Committee for Inner Mission in 1848 - an umbrella organization for numerous similar initiatives.

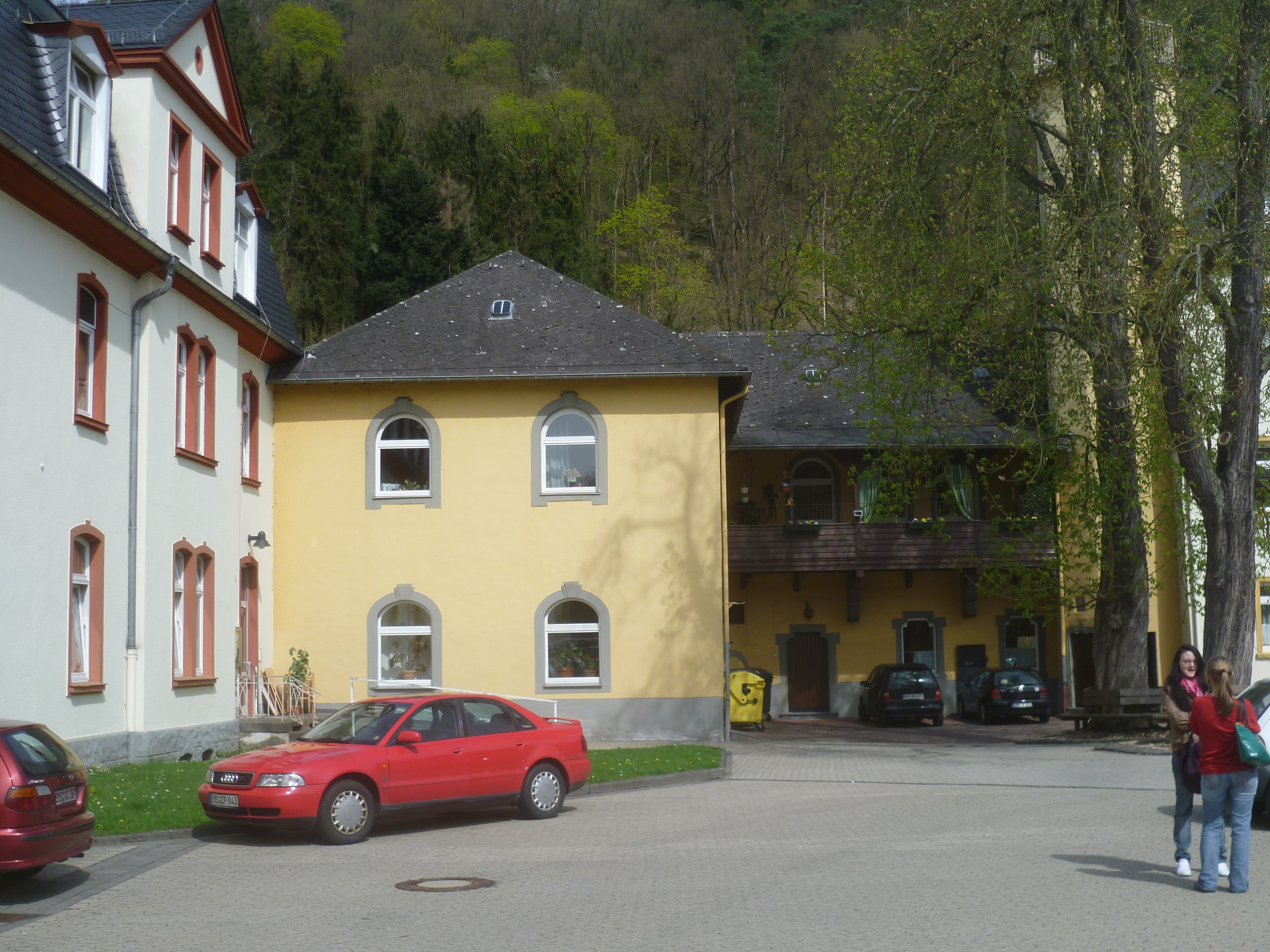
The small castle (Schlösschen) was the original building of today's Scheuern Foundation

To initiate and operate the rescue center, an association was formed, dedicated to gathering donations. Teacher H. Reichard, a friend of Burchardi's, offered his schoolhouse in Hömberg for use as accommodation, where the first boy was accommodated on October 18, 1850.

The following year, Countess von Giech facilitated the relocation of the rescue center to Langenau Castle between Obernhof and Nassau. Eduard Zais oversaw the necessary construction work.

By 1865, the rescue center housed twenty boys, but that same year, Countess von Giech died. Concurrently, the association successfully acquired the small castle in Scheuern along with a mill and some land. The small castle, the central structure of the Scheuern Homes, had its origins in a small moated castle built in 1596 as a widow's residence for Countess Maria von Nassau-Idstein. She inhabited this castle from 1607 onwards. The association incurred significant debt with these acquisitions, which impeded their work. To seek assistance, the association's board approached Johann Hinrich Wichern who dispatched Moritz Desiderius Horny, one of his most experienced employees, to Scheuern.

=== From a rescue center to a facility for individuals with intellectual disabilities ===
Occupancy of the Scheuern homes
Year	Occupants
1850	1
1855	20
1875	52
1880	115
1886	200
1895	274
1910	323
1930	602
1931	719
1937	778
1945	350
1965	854
1970	873
1975	657
1980	642
1985	634
Sources: Heime Scheuern 1963–1987

From 1863 onwards, Horny took on the leadership role at the home. There was a realization that numerous rescue centers had emerged in the administrative district of Wiesbaden, resulting in an oversupply. This led to a shift in the institution's focus, recognizing a lack of dedicated institutions for individuals with mental disabilities.

The latter half of the 19th century was marked by substantial social change. Between 1871 and 1910, the populations of Frankfurt, Wiesbaden, and Offenbach saw significant growth: Frankfurt by 355%, Wiesbaden by 207%, and Offenbach by 148%, mainly due to rural exodus. For working-class families, most of whom lived at the subsistence level, the placement of a disabled family member in an institution was a considerable relief, especially since the state governor paid for the placement after the Supportive Housing Act was amended in 1892.

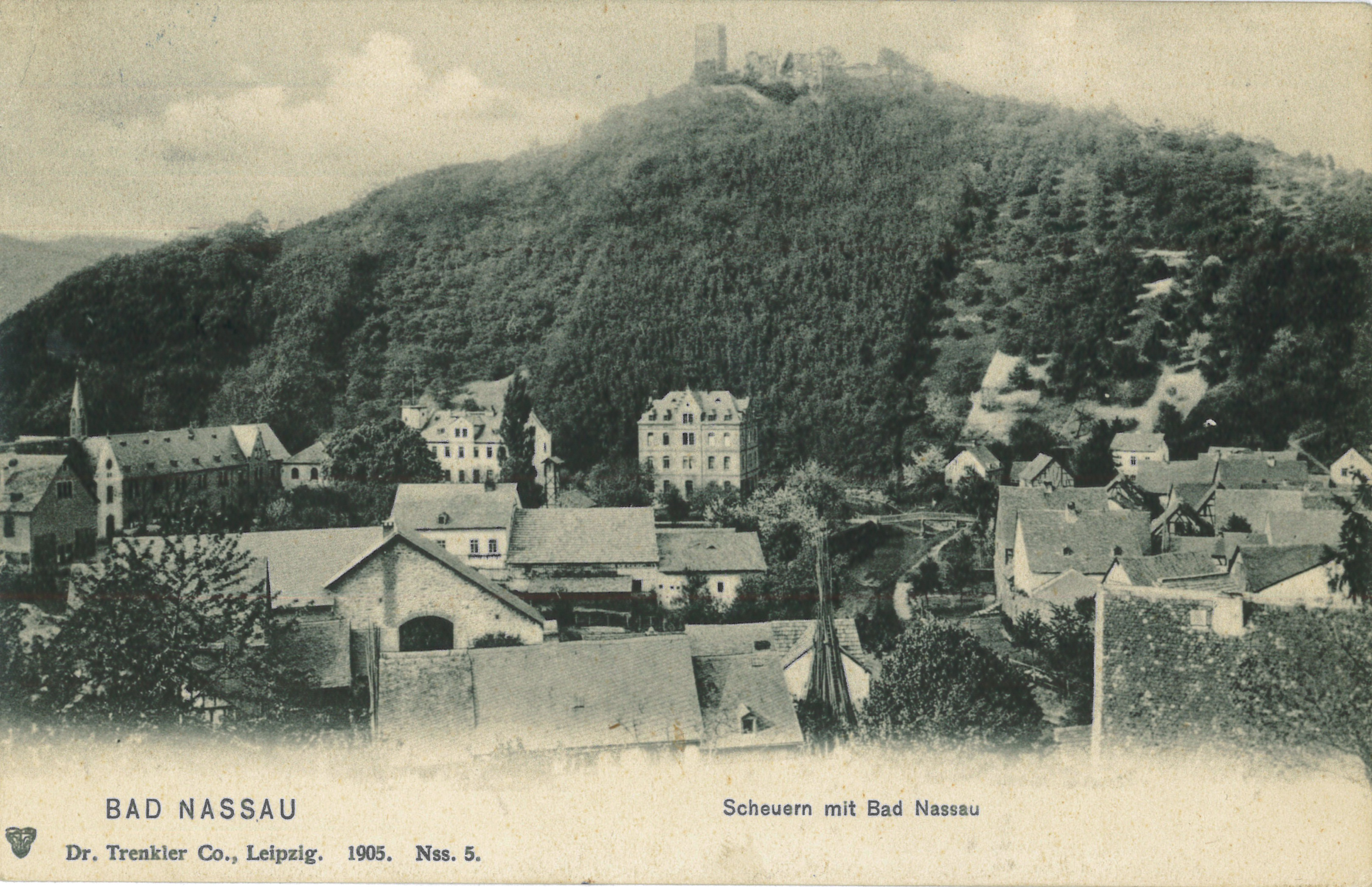
In the picture from 1905, the Scheuern Homes can be seen in the left part of the picture. It is clearly noticeable that some parts of the system have not yet been built. Nassau Castle on the mountain.

From 1869 onwards, the tasks were to educate and treat "educationally capable individuals with intellectual disabilities" and to care for and support "educationally incapable individuals with intellectual disabilities." The statutes of 1872 explicitly stated that the Scheuern Homes were a Protestant institution, and therefore all employees were required to profess their Protestant denomination. However, pupils of other denominations were also accepted and received religious instruction specific to their beliefs.

=== Debt relief and expansion ===
Horny achieved a milestone by eliminating the institution's debt, hiring a hospital doctor in 1878, and overseeing its consistent expansion. Over a sixteen-year period between 1870 and 1886, the Scheuern Homes received 1,225 admission applications, of which 807 had to be declined due to space and staff constraints. To address the growing demand, additional properties were procured: the Knabenhaus (now the Altes Haus) in 1875 and the Langauer Mill in 1888. Moreover, new constructions were initiated, such as the Mädchenhaus (now the Weißes Haus) in 1886 and the Rote Haus (now the Haus Bodelschwingh) in 1895.

During this time, the institution established workspaces and workshops intended for both educational and commercial purposes. These spaces encompassed various trades, including carpentry, basket weaving, tailoring, straw weaving, and a bakery. Livestock breeding and agriculture also played essential roles in the economic foundation of the Scheuern Homes.

The Supportive Housing Act of 1892 brought a change to institutions like the Scheuern Homes. With the provincial governor assuming the costs of accommodating disabled family members, the homes' economic basis strengthened, making them less reliant on donations.

Schools were increasingly controlled by the state at the beginning of the 20th century. In 1902, the government mandated the development of a curriculum for the first time. The name Anstalt Scheuern was utilized from 1905 onward.

=== The First World War and the years that followed ===
The years of World War I, from 1914 to 1918, posed significant challenges as public subsidies decreased while food costs rose sharply. Despite securing loans, the institution's survival was threatened, and malnutrition prevailed among residents which led to a significant increase in mortality rates.

From 1919, the institution was named the Scheuern Educational and Nursing Home for the Mentally Ill (Erziehungs- und Pflegeanstalt für Geistesschwache Scheuern). Occupancy at the homes sharply fell during the war, prompting the establishment of a children's recreation home for the city of Offenbach at the Langauer Mill in 1920. In 1927, this recreation home relocated to the Lahnberg. Director Karl Todt died on October 29, 1920, and his son Karl Todt Jr. took over management.

The first trained special school teacher was hired in 1928. In 1931, the institution was divided into four sections: the home for children who were difficult to educate, the Langau nursing home for older disabled people, the educational institution for the intellectually disabled and epileptic boys and girls with schooling, workshops, and the agricultural apprentices' home at the Mauch farm and the recreation home on the Lahnberg.

=== The Scheuern Homes under National Socialism ===
==== Deconfessionalization and cooptation ====
As a part of the Inner Mission, direct access to the Scheuern institution was initially unavailable to state authorities. While other facilities like the Kalmenhof in Idstein were quickly and harshly taken over, the Inner Mission institutions experienced a slower takeover. Nonetheless, the impact of National Socialism could already be felt leading up to the actual takeover. Forced sterilizations were performed, military sports exercises and voluntary work were organized, educational work was based on the model of a labor camp, and punishments for violations of the institution's rules were greatly increased.

In 1937, Governor Wilhelm Traupel, Chairman of the Provincial Welfare Association, laid claim to the leadership of all institutions in which people were accommodated at the expense of his authority. When the Scheuern institution resisted, the governor threatened to withdraw a loan and relocate all residents whose accommodation he paid for. This action would have likely caused the Scheuern institution to experience an economic collapse. New statutes with the Führer principle were adopted, and the board of directors was abolished and replaced by a single director, Social Welfare Officer and SS-Hauptsturmführer Fritz Bernotat. Karl Todt maintained his position as the head of the institution. This shift in leadership was marked by the board of directors' decision to ignore the directives of the Central Committee and independently modify the statutes. Todt justified the decision by highlighting its financial implications, the possibility of job loss, and the potential harm to residents caused by uprooting. It is assumed that Todt, who joined the National Socialist German Workers' Party in the same year, may have anticipated that this alteration would grant him more autonomy.

The Scheuern Homes established a precedent, leading the Central Committee of the institutions of the Inner Mission to direct that all future negotiations with authorities should be conducted by the Committee itself. This measure prevented similar takeovers at the Hephata institutions in Treysa and Nieder-Ramstadt, despite the significant economic losses due to the withdrawal of the state-housed patients.

==== Forced sterilizations ====
Even prior to the National Socialists taking power and implementing the Gesetz zur Verhütung erbkranken Nachwuchses (GzVeN) (Law for the Prevention of Offspring with Hereditary Diseases), doctors at religious institutions had already called for legislation permitting the sterilization of specific disabled individuals. This included asylum doctor Anthes and Director Todt.

"How joyfully we, who have been working for 83 years on the weak-minded and epileptic children of men according to the commission of our Savior, welcomed the racial care measures of our leader, which are to fight the evils from the roots [...] We therefore welcome the law on sterilization, i.e. infertility for the purpose of preventing hereditary diseases, the foundations of which we were allowed to help build with our experience [...] Even if the success of these measures will only have an effect in generations to come, we thank the Führer from the depths of our knowledge that he is sowing seeds of hope with his laws, from which a healthy, great German people may grow. God will bless this will because it is based on love for our neighbor!"

— Karl Todt : 82nd annual report from September 17, 1933 of the Scheuern homes

From 1934, before the de facto takeover by the National Socialist administration, forced sterilizations were implemented at the Scheuern Homes. Records indicate that at least 110 residents suffered forced sterilizations between 1934 and 1938. The extent of forced sterilizations in subsequent years is unclear due to the absence of records. It is presumed that the number of such sterilizations had significantly decreased, and the practice that was already established may not have been worth recording. Three hospitals were primarily responsible for the sterilizations: the Henrietten-Theresien-Foundation in Nassau, the Deaconess home in Bad Ems, and the State sanatorium in Herborn.

==== The Second World War ====
During the Second World War, life in Scheuern was significantly impacted. Some areas of Scheuern were utilized as a military hospital for wounded German soldiers, resulting in overcrowded conditions. Additionally, the food supply was so scarce that some soldiers shared their rations with residents in order to alleviate their suffering.

As the war continued, more residents were sent to work. Students worked at Nieverner Hut, Gebrüder Lotz car manufacturer in Bad Ems, Jean Holler grid and gate factory in Bad Ems, Buderus in Staffel, and Reichsbahn in Niederlahnstein.

Nassau suffered heavy air raids on February 1–2 and March 19, 1945. Pupils assisted in rescuing missing soldiers who were accommodated at Kurhaus, a military hospital at the time.

The end of the Second World War for the asylum came on March 27, 1945, when US army troops advanced from the south through Scheuern to Nassau. They shot and killed an inmate who was engaged in digging at the cemetery. This man was one of those who had managed to escape the initial transport on March 18, 1941, and his death marked the last fatality in the Scheuern institution during the National Socialist era.

==== The Scheuern Homes as an intermediate institution ====
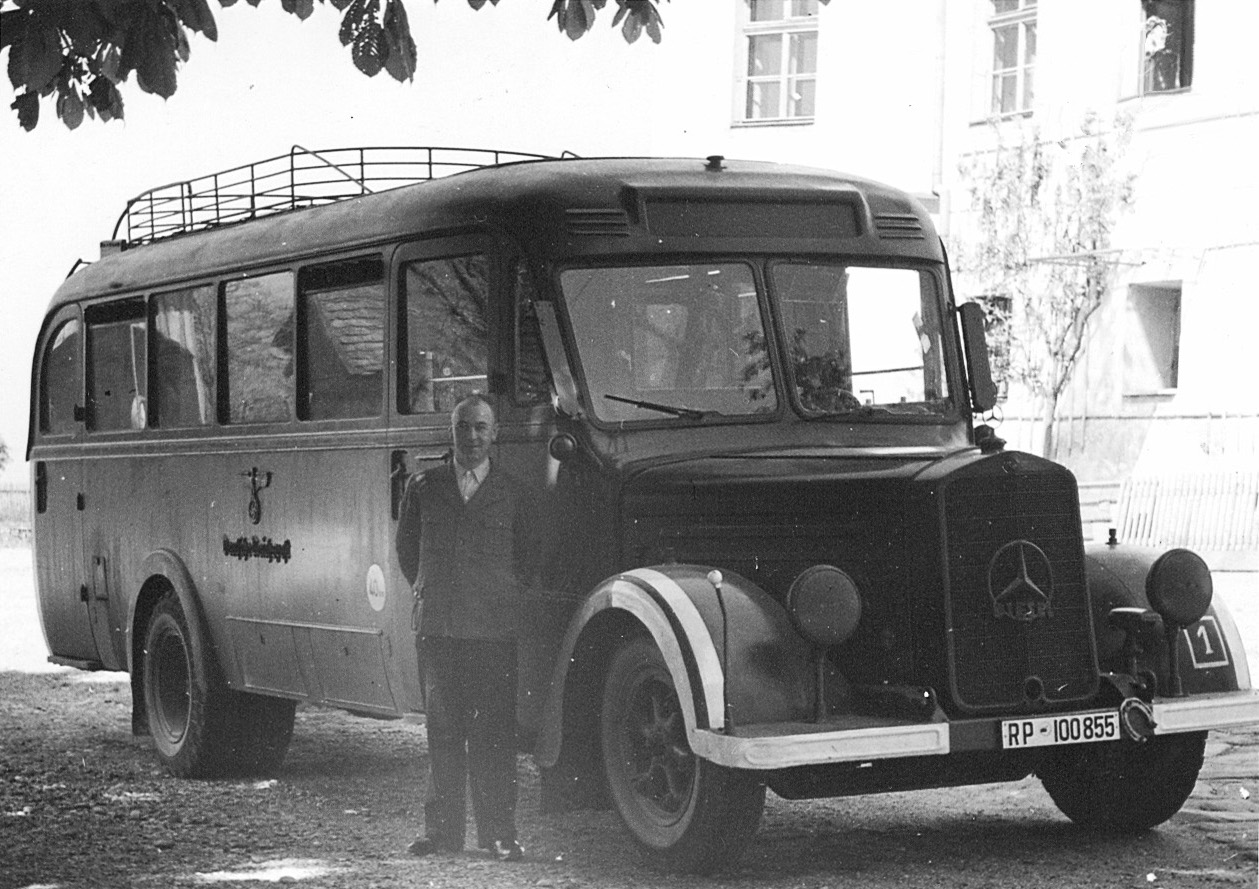
Gekrat bus

From the end of 1939, several sanatoriums and nursing homes were transformed into killing centers as part of Aktion T-4. The centers were used to exterminate useless eaters through various methods, including gassing. The Scheuern institution, along with Andernach, Eichberg in Eltville am Rhein, the Weilmünster clinic, and the Kalmenhof in Idstein, served as intermediate institutions of the Hadamar killing center. Killings in Hadamar took place from January 1941 onwards. The intermediate institutions functioned as temporary storage for transports destined for Hadamar. The goal was to ensure the immediate murder of only as many victims as were delivered. These transports were facilitated by Gekrat buses and the Reich railway.

In the mid-1940s, the Scheuern institution received selection forms to document the inmates, which were later forwarded to the Reich Committee for the Scientific Registration of Serious Hereditary and Congenital Conditions. Decisions concerning life and death were taken there. On March 18, 1941, the first group of 38 individuals was transported to the Arnsdorf institution, despite originally intending to transport 50. However, only 23 were available when it was assembled. An additional 15 individuals were chosen on an ad hoc basis. Soon after their arrival, 31 of these people were transferred to the Pirna-Sonnenstein killing center, where they were gassed. The filming of their murder was even recorded.

Nine additional transports were dispatched on 23 July 1941, destined for Hadamar. A total of 658 people were sent to be murdered on these transports. While the transport to Arnsdorf and the first four transports to Hadamar consisted exclusively of regular residents of the Scheuern asylum, the other five transports mainly deported so-called "intermediate asylum patients".

On 24 August 1941, Adolf Hitler gave verbal instructions to end Action T-4 and to stop adult euthanasia in the six killing centers. This instruction was based on the public protests of this action. However, child euthanasia continued, as did the decentralized killing of disabled adults in individual sanatoriums and nursing homes.

As a result of this directive, there were almost no transfers to Scheuern in 1942, although around 300 intermediate patients were still accommodated here. Transfers began again at the beginning of 1943. By 1945, a further 717 people had been transported to Hadamar, 651 of whom died shortly after arriving there.

Paediatric wards were established in other institutions, such as the Eichberg and Kalmenhof asylums in the Hesse-Nassau district association. Instead of gassing, deaths were caused by drug poisoning and deliberate starvation. From 1943 to 1945, 88 out of 141 children who were transferred from Scheuern to Kalmenhof died there.

However, 153 individuals from the intermediate transports also died in Scheuern itself, 129 of whom are buried in the local cemetery. Hunger, cold, lack of medical care, and only makeshift care were the causes of the high mortality rate. Moreover, a folding coffin, a type of coffin that was utilized frequently due to the frequency of deaths, is also noted in the Scheuern institution in this context.

==== Resistance ====
Director Todt attempted to save long-term residents from deportation by hiding them in the institution or placing them with farmers who needed their labor during harvest time. He also warned residents' relatives of an impending deportation on several occasions to arrange a release before they were taken away. Although families occasionally declined to take in the inmates. In certain instances, incarcerated individuals were converted into prison employees to avoid deportation. In these cases, the transportation supervisor frequently detained other inhabitants for deportation. Presently, it can be assumed that the T4 Central Office tacitly granted the heads of the institutions a certain amount of leeway in this regard. This policy encouraged numerous institutional leaders to cooperate and prevented overt opposition. However, it is noteworthy that fewer fatalities occurred in Scheuern, compared to other equivalently sized institutions designated as intermediate facilities at Hadamar.

=== Post-war period ===
Todt and Anthes were arrested by the French occupation authorities after the end of the war. Two trials followed, first at the Koblenz Regional Court and on appeal at the Koblenz Higher Regional Court. Both were acquitted in these proceedings. At first instance, the court held that the two defendants were objectively and subjectively guilty, but that their actions were motivated by the desire to avert even greater harm. In the second instance, the hiding of victims was seen as subversive activity against the crimes, while nothing more was possible.

Following the war, the institution's future direction was debated by the board. The choice was between a return to Protestant-Christian principles or a shift towards general welfare work. The statutes of 1947 reasserted the commitment to diaconia and the Protestant Church, giving rise to the name Heilerziehungs- und Pflegeanstalt Scheuern (Scheuern Nursing and Care Home).

In 1956, the Wichern school, the largest special school for individuals with learning disabilities in Rhineland-Palatinate at that time, opened at the Scheuern Homes with a capacity of 430. The Horny House was then inaugurated in 1959. However, the children's recreation home on Lahnberg closed in 1961.

On February 21, 1962, six months after his wife Marie's death, Karl Todt Jr. died at the age of 75.

=== The Fischer era ===
Bernhard Fischer became the new director on December 1, 1963, replacing Werner Stöhr. During the 1960s and 1970s, legal innovations were implemented in the Federal Republic of Germany, which affected living and working conditions in residential care facilities. These innovations were also reflected in the Scheuern Homes. These advancements comprised the Nursing Homes Act, the Severely Disabled Persons Act, the Federal Social Assistance Act, and the Minimum Building Regulations for Nursing Homes. Minimum standards were established for staffing ratios and living conditions, requiring the training of qualified staff in homes. As a result, an internal training course was offered in 1964, replaced by curative education assistant training in 1967. While the employee count rose to 310 by 1973, nearly doubling 1963's 158, the number of residents decreased from 847 to 691 in the same period.

In 1966, an employee representative body was elected for the first time, and in 1970, the name was changed to Heilerziehungs- und Pflegeheime Scheuern (Scheuern residential care and nursing homes).

The institution's infrastructure underwent many expansions, creating new residential facilities. In subsequent years, Laurenburg Castle was leased as a residential home for the elderly, while significant construction projects included the Buchardi House on the Mauch farm in 1967, the Lahnberg residential homes in 1977, and the Schimmerich residential homes in 1984.

In the 1970s, the institution's profile changed again, as a nationwide system of special schools was established in Rhineland-Palatinate, resulting in a significant decline in applications from children and young people with learning disabilities. Consequently, the school's activities are reoriented towards the support of practically educable and severely disabled individuals. This ultimately led to the closure of the Wichern School in 1985. In contrast, many appropriate jobs were generated. The Langauer Mill, offering 180 positions, opened its doors in 1982, followed by the inauguration of the sheltered workshops in Singhofen in 1994. The Rosengarten House was also established in 1995.

=== Coming to terms with the past ===
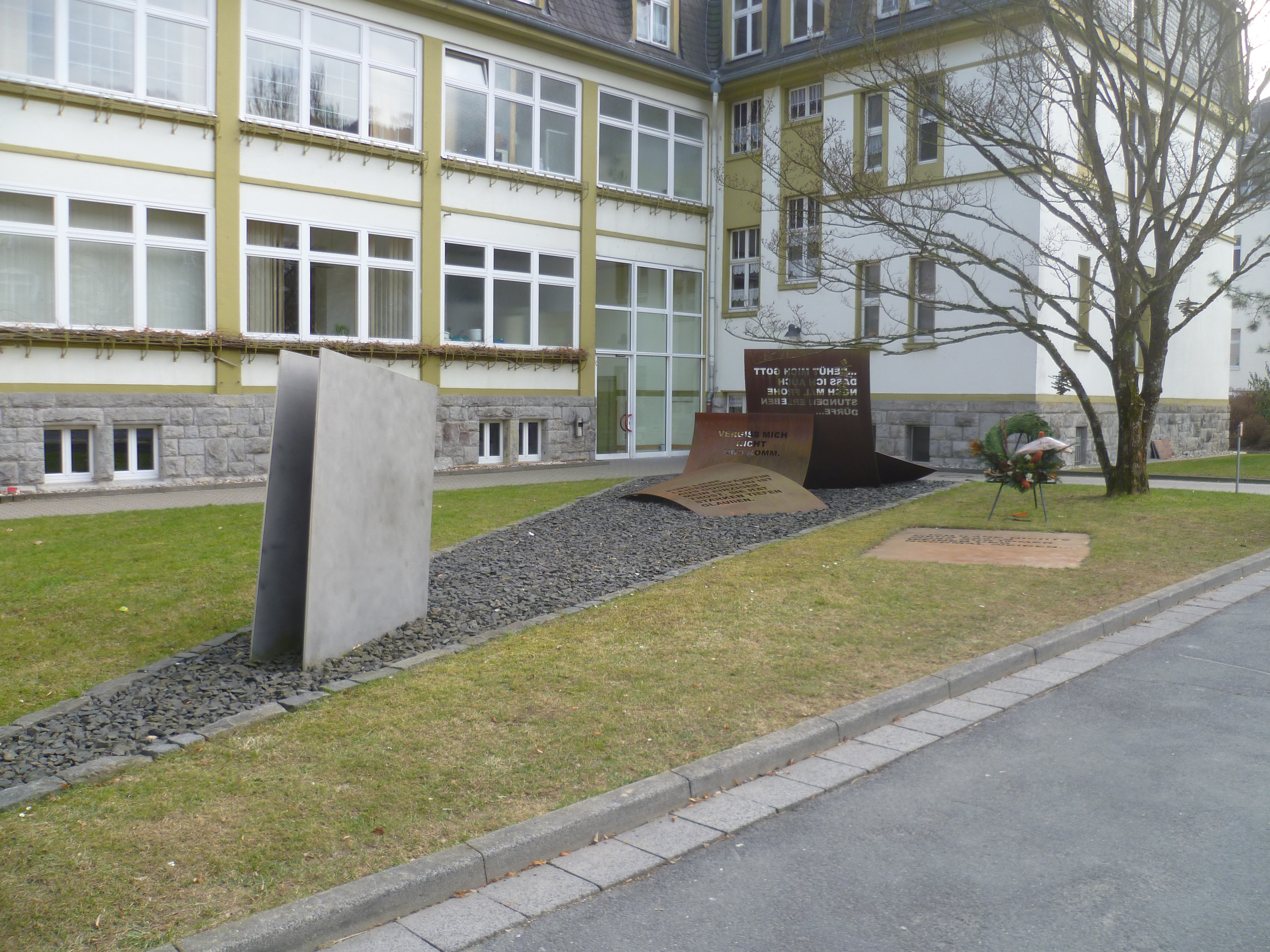
Memorial for the euthanasia victims of the Scheuern Foundation

The Scheuern Homes took longer than most state or diaconal institutions to acknowledge their National Socialist past and establish remembrance practices. Researchers even considered them to be particularly secretive about their history, as highlighted in statements by Ute Daub and Ernst Klee during an October 25, 1995, symposium at the Hessian State Parliament.

The National Socialist past was not explicitly denied. A 1952/53 film documentary addressed the role of the Scheuern Homes. In the 1960s, the cemetery erected wooden crosses for the 130 victims who died during their stay in the homes and were buried there. However, over time, these crosses deteriorated, were removed, and not replaced.

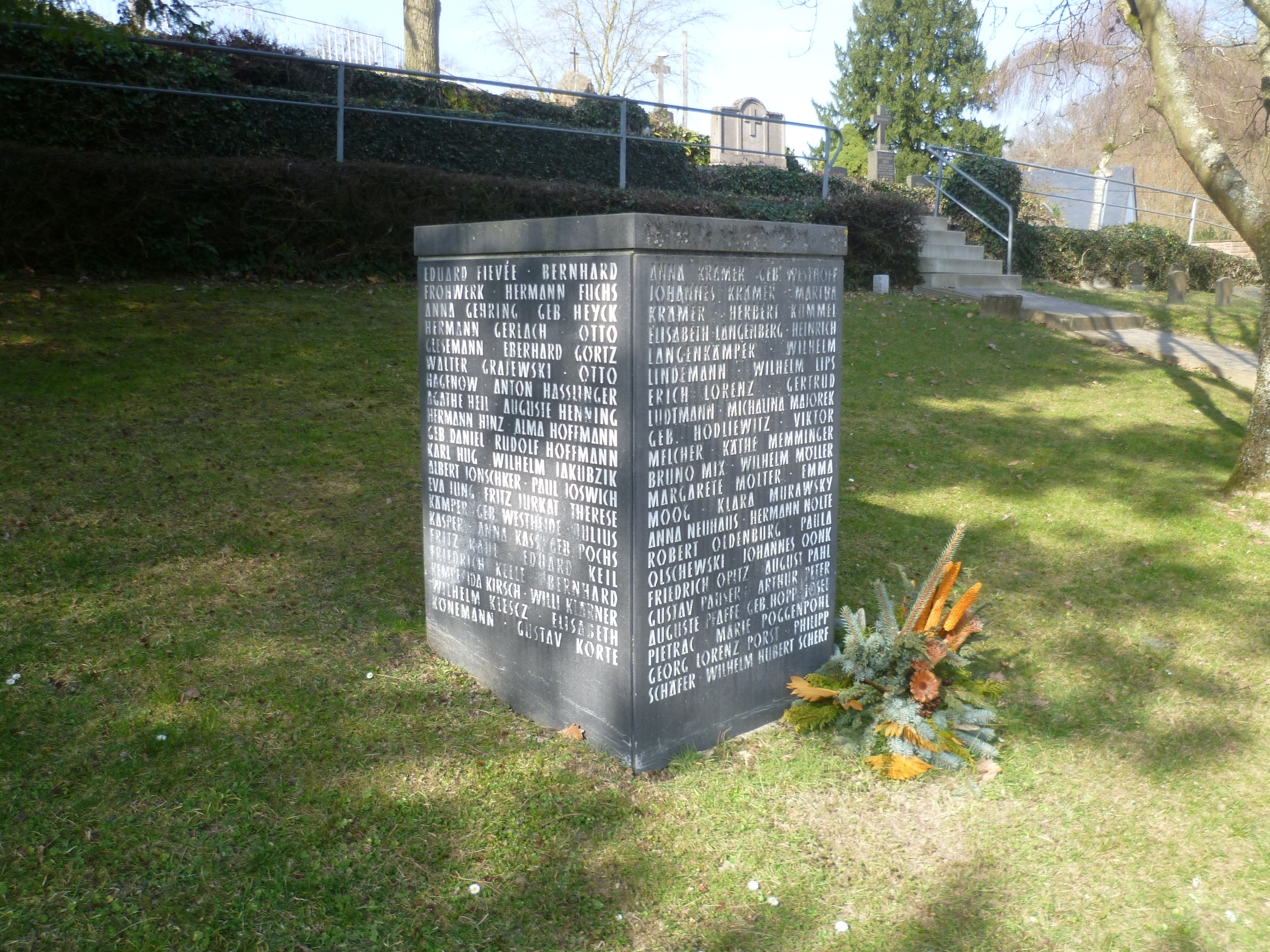
Memorial for the 129 victims who died in the Scheuern Homes and are buried in the local cemetery

From the mid-1980s, there was an increase in inquiries from researchers about the fate of patients transferred after their interim stay. If there was proven scientific interest, the homes were granted access to their primary records. However, director Fischer stated in 1983 that the institution was not particularly exposed to state access, even if the homes had been the last place of residence on several occasions due to their proximity to the Hadamar killing centre.

Upon a change in management in 1987, under Herrmann Otto Fuchs, there was a shift in addressing the past. Documentation was compiled, and filming for Alles Kranke ist Last was authorized. Euthanasia crimes were discussed within an exhibition on the history of the homes.

The discovery of Karl Todt's trial files in 1997 prompted further educational efforts, including interviews with surviving residents, archiving documents, establishing an exhibition, and deciding to erect a memorial for euthanasia victims by the institution's 150th anniversary in 1999.

Starting in 1999, visits to the memorial in Hadamar became an integral part of the staff training program. On November 19, 2000, the memorial to the victims of euthanasia, located in the central square of the building, was inaugurated.

In January 2011, the Cologne artist Gunter Demnig embedded a stumbling block in the sidewalk on the corner of Burgberg and Brückenstrasse. It bears the inscription "More than 1000 people were transferred by the National Socialists between 1941 and 1945 from the Scheuern state institution, which had been converted into an intermediate care facility, to other 'sanatoriums' and murdered there. Most of them in Hadamar".

In light of Karl Todt's controversial role during the Nazi era, his involvement in the events in Scheuern, and his support of forced sterilization, the Foundation's Board of Directors made the decision to revert the Karl Todt House to its original name, Haus Lahnberg, on January 27, 2012 - the Day of Remembrance for the Victims of National Socialism.

=== Change and reorientation for the future ===
The Scheuern Homes addressed and resolved a case of sexual abuse involving a pastor in 2002, leading to imprisonment following full confession and subsequent ecclesiastical disciplinary proceedings.

Alternative forms of housing have been continuously expanded since 1997. The Scheuern Foundation currently maintains two decentralised residential homes in Bad Ems, one of which is designed for people with mental disabilities and one specifically for people with acquired brain damage. There are also two residential homes in Nastätten and two in Nassau. Further homes are planned, for example in the district town of Montabaur in the Westerwald district. The background to this decentralisation is the social model of inclusion.

As part of this reorientation, the Board of Directors decided to amend the statutes at the beginning of 2011, which resulted in the renaming of the foundation as the Scheuern Foundation. A further amendment to the statutes followed at the beginning of 2015: the previous director was replaced by the Board of Directors, which manages the business of the Scheuern Foundation and is responsible for managing the entire institution. The previous Board of Directors was replaced by a Foundation Council of seven to nine members. This is the highest foundation body that monitors, advises, and supports the Executive Board in its work.

In August 2012, Inklusa GmbH, a subsidiary of the Scheuern Foundation, established a CAP supermarket in Hillscheid, providing employment opportunities subject to social security contributions for six individuals with diverse disabilities.
