= CAP Markets =

German supermarket chain

CAP Märkte (CAP Markets) are medium-sized neighbourhood supermarkets in Germany employing disabled people. Each unit is typically run by a local disablement association, but the brand is owned by a co-operative of sheltered workshops. As well as good working conditions, they provide a cherished community service. The chain of CAP Märkte has grown steadily since 1998 and in 2022 reached 105 shops.

== History ==
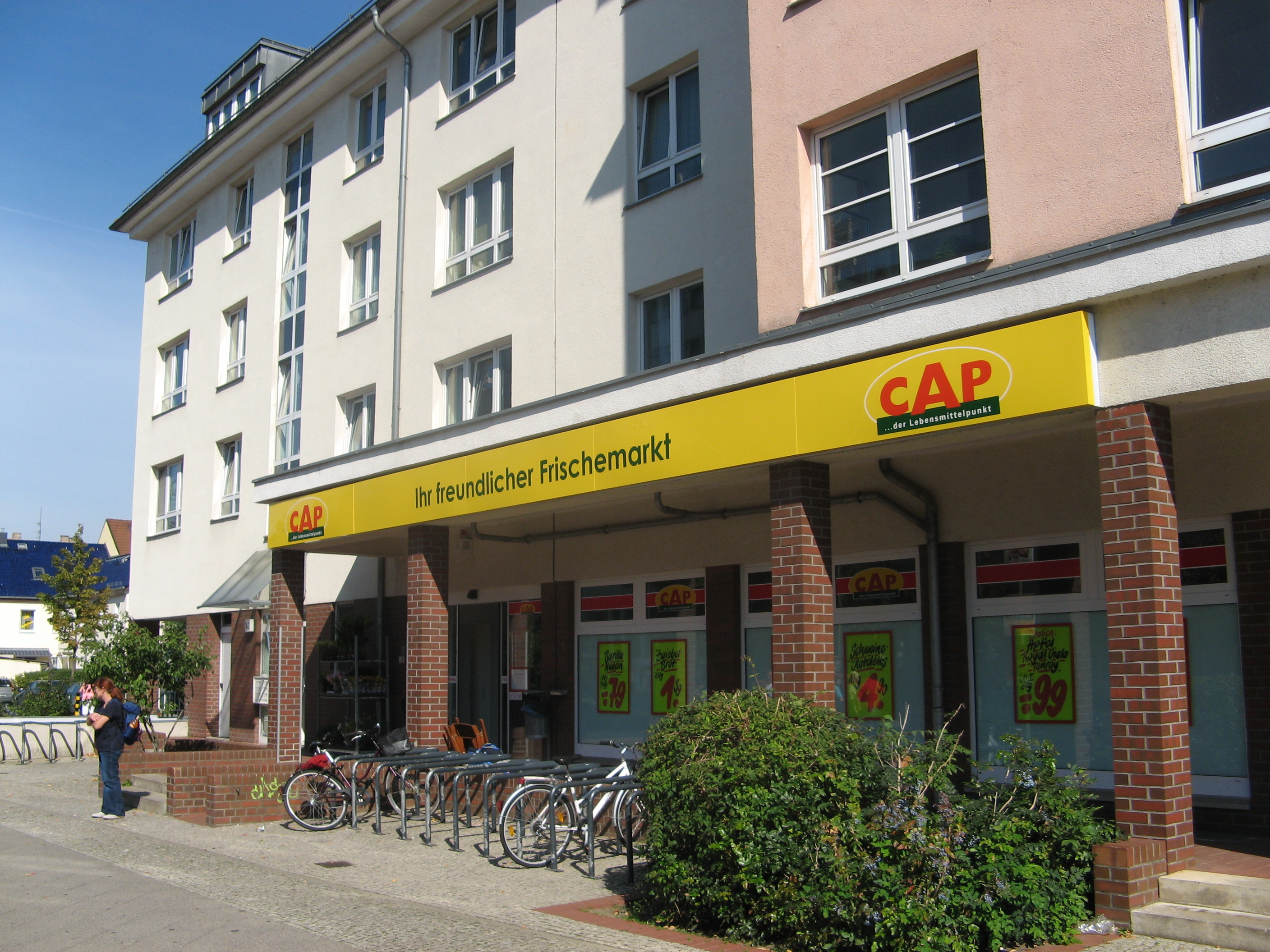
The CAP Market in Köpenick, Berlin, Germany

GDW Süd – Genossenschaft der Werkstatten für behinderte Menschen Süd eG – is a charitable co-operative set up in 1985 by the officially accredited organisations providing employment for disabled people on the two Germany Länder of Baden-Württemberg and Bavaria. It works with five other similar co-operatives to cover the whole of Germany. Initially it was a joint purchasing organisation for the sheltered workshops run by its member organisations. In 1983, it was restructured and now has five objectives:

- to buy and sell jointly for its member institutions
- to develop and sell products suitable for manufacture by disabled people
- to set up and manage co-operative operations among member institutions
- to give business and technical advice
- to manage development projects

It works in six business areas to fulfil these tasks: the CAP Märkte, WKE (electronics recycling and document shredding), EP (assembly), AVK (order and payroll processing), ISB (information, training and advice) and KBM (joint purchasing).

GDW Süd developed the CAP Markt idea (the name comes from ‘handicap’) with its punning slogan "CAP – der Lebensmittelpunkt" which combines the words for "grocery point" and "centre of life". The business idea is to take over premises left empty by the flight of the main supermarket chains to out-of-town sites, and open neighbourhood grocery shops that are accessible on foot and provide a friendly service. The shops have a sales area of 400–1,000 m^{2}, stock 7,000 lines, turn over between €750,000 and €2m a year, and employ between five and 20 people, two-thirds of whom are handicapped.

They provide jobs for handicapped people, aiding their integration through direct contact with customers; bring about local regeneration (by providing accessible facilities for people without cars); and counter exclusion by offering services such as home delivery of meals or postal services.

== Results ==
The first CAP-Markt opened in Sindelfingen, near Stuttgart, in 1999. By 2017 the chain had grown to 106 shops, mostly in Baden-Württemberg, but increasingly in other areas of Germany as well. In 2006 the workforce numbered around 420, of whom 150 were skilled workers and 270 handicapped people. Of these 270, 100 worked under sheltered workshop conditions.

Approximately one-third of shops are run by sheltered workshops, and two-thirds are social firms trading on the market. Some associations run several shops. The attraction for disablement organisations running sheltered workshops is that opening a CAP Market enables them to create jobs for their users in the ‘real world’. These allow disabled people to have near-normal working life and to be a fully integrated part of the local community. Many of the jobs that sheltered workshops undertake, such as assembly or logistics, are carried out away from the public gaze. Retailing, on the other hand, brings users into direct contact with the public, and so has a greater therapeutic effect.

== Success factors ==
=== Political support ===
The concept has three attractions for policy-makers:

(a) labour market policy: the Land of Baden-Württemberg, where the CAP Märket started, wishes to ensure equal opportunities for its disabled citizens. Its labour market policy is therefore to encourage the creation of integration enterprises, and its target is to reach a total of 2,000 jobs for disabled people by 2010. It has a successful programme including financial incentives for employers and career support services which has succeeded in reducing unemployment among disabled people by 20%.

(b) regeneration policy – the quality of life in towns falls when retailers close down, so there is support from residents for the empty sites to be reused. The properties are available at affordable prices.

c) sustainable development policy: the shops are close to customers, and can be reached on foot, which is particularly valuable for people without cars. To capitalise on this advantage, the shops offer a delivery service.

=== A generous financial framework ===
Germany's social security law provides that firms must employ a certain quota of "severely disabled" people. Those that do not are obliged to pay into a ‘compensation fund’ instead. This fund is used to pay a wage subsidy to integration enterprises (Integrationsbetriebe) that do employ disabled people. This allows higher staffing levels to be maintained, which both compensates for the lower productivity of some workers, and allows an atmosphere to be created in which people have time for each other. This makes the jobs sustainable for disabled people.

The investment required to open a shop is reduced by the fact that a sum of between €10,000 and €15,000 per job created for a disabled person is also available, half of which is loan and half grant. Some private foundations will also make grants of as much as €100,000 towards start-up costs.

An important but often forgotten factor is that it was the relatively generous – in the European context – subsidy regime that applies to sheltered workshops that allowed them to accumulate the working capital needed to develop the business idea in the first place.

=== A good market segment ===
The concept also offers many advantages to shoppers:

- the customers have money as well as a mission

- the service is in demand by two stakeholders: local communities as well as unemployed disabled people. This gives access to multiple sources of support

- a culture of friendly and helpful service: staff can take the time to advise and chat with customers, and customer suggestions are welcomed

- a wide range of products – 7,000 lines – which makes it a ‘one stop’ alternative to out-of-town supermarkets. While four-fifths of sales must be from the CAP Market range, the remaining fifth can be sourced elsewhere, to suit local and regional tastes.

- developing new services to gain customer loyalty – for instance delivery

- ecology: going with the trend to energy-saving and against out-of-town shopping

- industry experience: the managing director has a long working history in retail

- the connections and market intelligence that comes with that experience

- fairness: a balanced license agreement that combines local autonomy with central discipline

- solidarity and mutual aid: a structured decisions and information system based on regular meetings

- critical mass: the CAP group has built up sufficient size it has negotiating power with its suppliers, and especially EDEKA, from whom it gets a small discount over the prices that are available to member retailers generally; in return it provides EDEKA with a significant boost to sales, without the headaches of giving detailed support to each customer

=== Integration philosophy ===
- Acceptance of disability: the employers know and accept their employees’ health circumstances, and tolerate a certain level of mistakes, which gives the employees a sense of security.

- Time for people: staff are expected to work to the best of their abilities, but are not excessively pressurised.

- People first: the shops do not need to maximise profits; it is sufficient that they break even and make a small surplus.

== Methods and tools ==
=== Business idea ===
The business idea has the strength of generating benefits for several stakeholders:

- for the licensees, the key benefits of opening a CAP Market are that they are joining well-known and trusted brand. This generates customer loyalty and reduces advertising expense. They receive, in return for a relatively low levy on turnover, a great deal of invaluable help and advice born of long experience in the sector. This covers location, shop design, the product range, recruitment, management systems and much more;

- for local politicians, a CAP Market offers integration for disabled people, urban regeneration, improved local services and environmental sustainability;

- for disabled people, it provides a job under conditions that are close to those in the mainstream labour market, and which are subject to standard employment contracts, but which are humane and which suit vulnerable people. Most jobs are full-time, but there are also some part-time jobs such as collecting trolleys, which are paid on an hourly basis and serve to ease people back into the discipline of working.

Customer loyalty is further rewarded through a loyalty card which, after 20 shopping visits, gives the customer the right to a small gift.

== Information/research ==
GDW Süd helps each new licensee to draw up a business plan. The long retail experience and contacts that GDW Süd possesses mean that it can offer extremely accurate advice to intended licensees. For instance when a new location is under consideration, it can often find out through trade connections what the previous turnover was, thus reducing the risk of opening up.

Once the shop is trading, it gives management support using benchmarking tools it has developed over the years. These enable licensees to compare their own performance with that of comparable shops, discern their strong and weak points, set realistic targets and measure their future performance against them.

== Finance ==
No specific financial package is available, however the fact that the brand and system is by now well-known and proven, along with the group's reputation for honesty and fair dealing, increases investor confidence. The shop licensee pays for the franchise in two installments, and thereafter pays a levy of 1-2% on turnover. Some Länder offer financial incentives, and some local authorities may help, for instance with premises.

== Premises ==
Premises are not in short supply. Typically, local authorities will approach GDW Süd with a proposal to re-occupy an empty shop. In practice, some 80% of these proposals have to be turned down. GDW Süd offers support during lease negotiations and in fitting the shop out.

== Start-up ==
The crucial event in each shop's life is opening day. It is absolutely imperative to start out on the right foot, as it is within the first two weeks that future customers will make their first visit and decide whether they will return regularly. It is a byword in retailing that the first week's turnover determines future turnover. GDW Süd therefore gives each new shop particularly strong support in the opening period. It drafts in additional staff to make sure the atmosphere is good and the service is up to scratch. It applies the many 'tips of the trade' that it knows; for instance, giving away alcoholic drinks at the opening can backfire.

== Training and organisational development ==
GDW Süd helps licensees to recruit staff, and organises training in various aspects of retailing: dealing with food, ordering, cash handling, operating the computer system, quality assurance etc.

By contrast, the licensees already possess the necessary skills related to integration. As regards organisational development, a meeting is held every year of all shops. Regional meetings take place monthly. Less formally, telephone support is available from shop to shop. Quality assurance is an important aspect of the licence, and the central staff make regular visits. To preserve the reputation of the group as a whole, they are authorised by the agreement to issue instructions for shop managers should this be necessary.
