= Irmgard Huber =

German war criminal

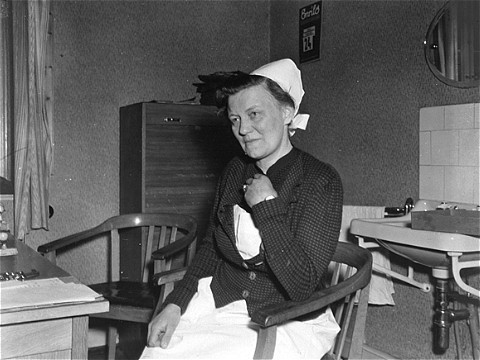
During Investigation in Hadamar, April 7, 1945

Irmgard Huber (9 July 1901–4 December 1974) was the head nurse at the Hadamar killing centre. Beginning in late 1939, it was operated as one of six major centres for Action T4, a secret sterilization and "involuntary euthanasia" program in Nazi Germany. Nearly 15,000 German citizens were murdered there, including thousands of children.

After the war and the defeat of Germany in 1945, this area was within the American Zone of Occupation. Huber was prosecuted and convicted by the United States military for the murders of forced labourers from Poland and other allied countries, and sentenced to 25 years in prison. In 1946, she was prosecuted and convicted by newly reconstructed German courts for the murders of German citizens. Her sentence was lengthened by eight years.

== Early life and career ==
Irmgard Huber was born and grew up in Hadamar in present-day Hessen. She went to local schools and to nursing school, entering the profession in 1932. Before the end of that decade, she had become head nurse at Hadamar Clinic, a major psychiatric facility.

== Background ==
Hadamar Killing Facility was one of six major sites in Nazi Germany that killed thousands of Germans deemed to have incurable illnesses under the disguise of "euthanasia". Most of them had physical and mental disabilities. German Nazi leader Adolf Hitler determined that he did not want to use state funds to maintain them in wartime and that they should have "mercy deaths". Death certificates were falsified. After German unification in 1990, new records were found that enabled historians to establish that a total of 200,000 Germans were killed nationally in this programme. At Hadamar, nearly 15,000 mentally or physically disabled people, children first and then adults, were killed, first the patients of the facility, then others bused in from such institutions as nursing homes, old age homes, and state childcare institutions.

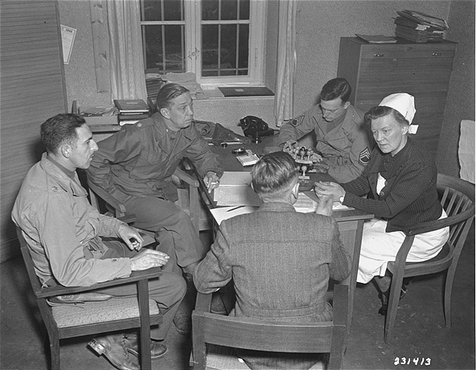
American war crimes investigators question Irmgard Huber at the Hadamar Institute, May 1945

The Americans who controlled this area after the downfall of the Nazi regime wanted to prosecute the murders, but were limited by international law to crimes against their own military personnel, or military or civilians of their allies. Hospital records revealed that 476 forced labourers from Poland and the Soviet Union – Allied countries – had also died at Hadamar. Their murders were within American jurisdiction. Irmgard Huber, head nurse of the hospital, was among the staff members who were arrested by the Americans. Her claims that she never killed patients were corroborated by co-workers and witnesses. She was released.

Later, the court ruled that Huber played a role in selecting patients for murder and in falsifying death certificates. She also controlled the supply of drugs used to lethally overdose patients, the preferred method of "euthanasia" from 1941 through 1945. Huber was rearrested, tried with six others and convicted. Leon Jaworski, prominent later in the United States during the Watergate hearings, was the chief prosecuting official. Huber was sentenced to 25 years in prison for serving as an accomplice to murder.

As the only female defendant, she received the lightest sentence at the trial. Chief administrator, Alfons Klein, and two male nurses, Heinrich Ruoff and Karl Willig, were sentenced to death and executed in 1946. The chief physician, Adolf Wahlmann, received a life sentence. Two other members of the administrative staff received sentences of 20 to 35 years.

In 1946, after the reconstruction of German courts under the occupation, Huber was among twenty-five members of the Hadamar staff, including Wahlmann, tried for the murders of thousands of German citizens at Hadamar. Convicted as an accomplice to murder in at least 120 cases, Huber was sentenced to eight additional years in prison. Wahlmann was also convicted in the second trial and sentenced to death. This was commuted to life in prison due to West Germany's abolition of capital punishment in 1949.

== Later life ==
Huber's sentence was reduced to 12 years, and she was released from prison in July 1953. Her sentence imposed by West Germany was not enforced. Huber lived in Hadamar until her death there in 1974.

== Literature ==
- Anders Otte Stensager: Die Leute schrien: 'Ich will nicht sterben'": Oberschwester Irmgard Huber". In: Wolfgang Proske (Hrsg.): Täter Helfer Trittbrettfahrer. Band 18: NS-Belastete aus Oberbayern (Süd). Kugelberg Verlag, Gerstetten 2024, ISBN 978-3-945893-26-5, S. 200-206.

== Notes and references ==
This article incorporates text from the United States Holocaust Memorial Museum, released under the GFDL.
