= Hadamar killing centre =

Nazi extermination centre in Hesse, Germany (1941–1945)

Coordinates: 50°27′03″N 8°02′30″E

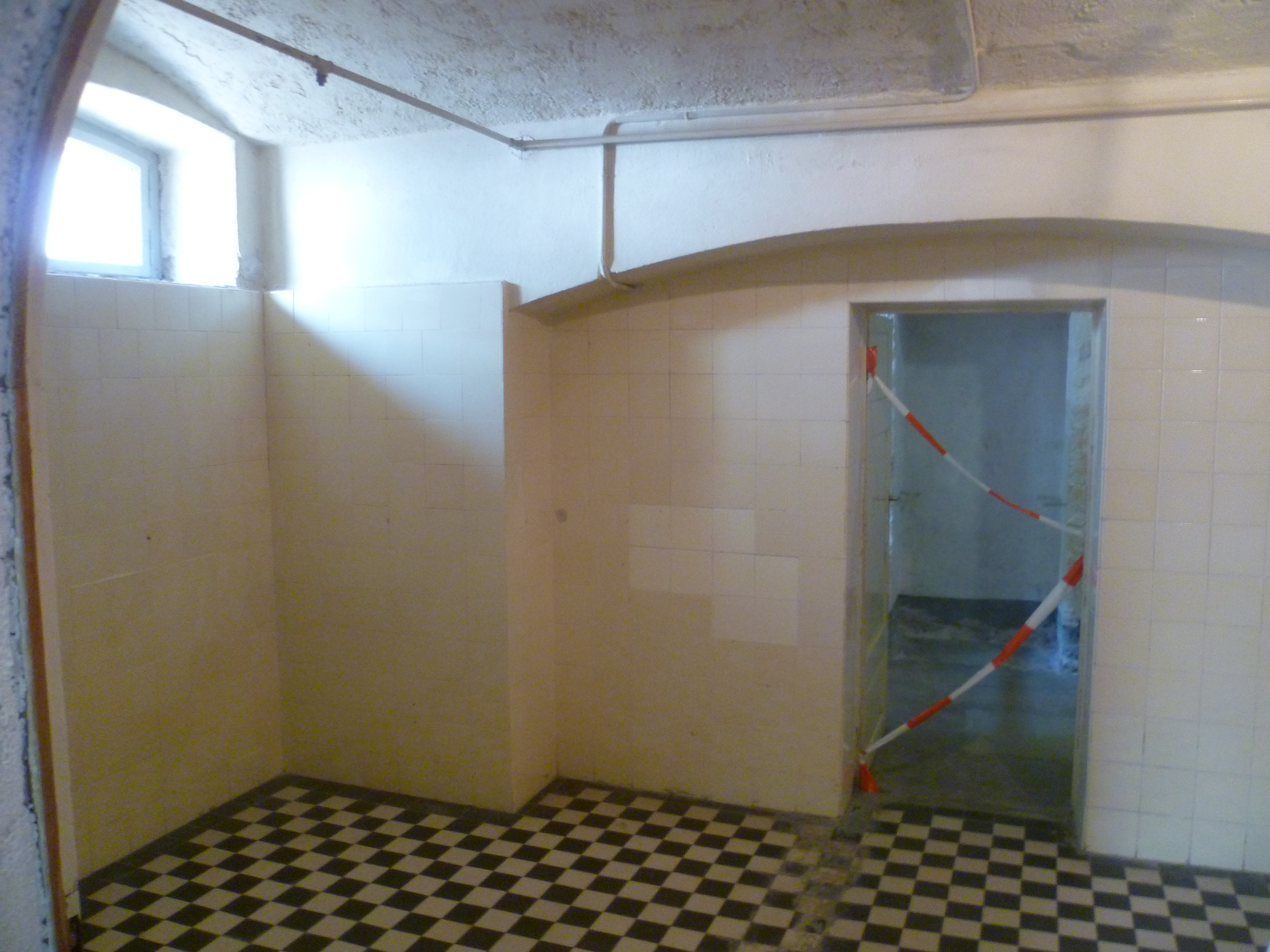
Gas chamber in Hadamar hospital

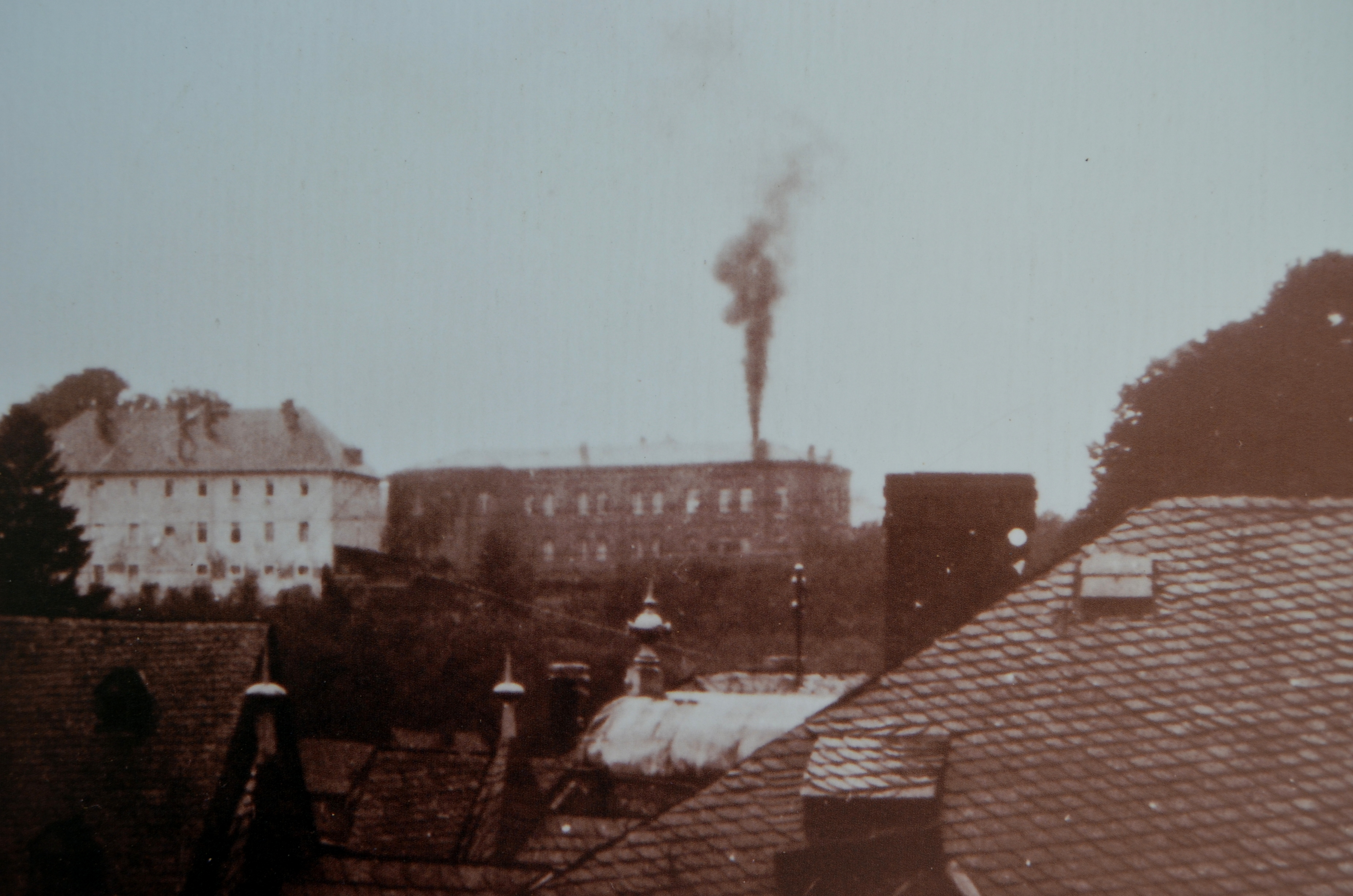
Crematorium chimney at Hadamar hospital

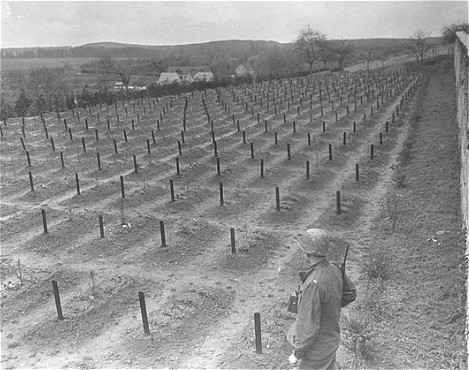
The cemetery at Hadamar, April 1945

The Hadamar killing centre (German: NS-Tötungsanstalt Hadamar) was a killing facility involved in the Nazi involuntary euthanasia programme known as Aktion T4. It was housed within a psychiatric hospital located in the German town of Hadamar, near Limburg in Hesse-Nassau.

Beginning in 1939, the Nazis used Hadamar and five other sites as killing facilities for Aktion T4, which performed mass sterilizations and mass murder of "undesirable" members of German society, specifically those with physical and mental disabilities. In total, an estimated 200,000 people were murdered at these facilities, including thousands of children. These actions were in keeping with Nazi ideas about eugenics. While officially ended in 1941, the programme lasted until the German surrender in 1945. Nearly 15,000 German citizens were transported to the hospital and murdered there, most by gas chamber and the rest by lethal injection and starvation. In addition, hundreds of forced labourers from Poland and other countries occupied by the Nazis were murdered there.

Hadamar and its hospital fell within the American occupation zone after the war. During 8–15 October 1945, United States forces conducted the Hadamar Trial, the first mass atrocity trial in the years following World War II. They prosecuted doctors and staff on charges of murdering citizens of allied countries, namely, forced labourers from Poland and other countries. The US had jurisdiction for these crimes under international law. Several people were convicted and executed for these crimes. After the German courts were reconstructed under the occupation, in 1946, a doctor and nurse were prosecuted by Germans for the murders of nearly 15,000 German citizens at the hospital. Both were convicted.

The hospital continues to operate. It holds a memorial to the euthanasia murders as well as an exhibit about the Nazi programme.

== Background ==
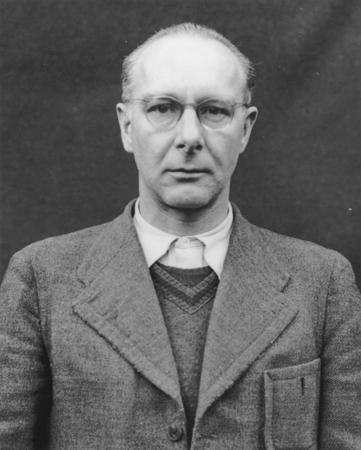
Viktor Brack, organiser of the T4 Programme

Since the late 19th century, doctors and scientists had been developing theories of racial purity based on eugenics, a concept popular at the time that developed from several disciplines including social history, biology, anthropology and genetics. As Weindling (1989) explained, there had been several movements in Germany since the end of World War I concerned with the 'degeneration' of German racial purity that culminated with the founding in 1927 of the Kaiser Wilhelm Institute of Anthropology, Human Heredity, and Eugenics. Although there had been demands since the early 1920s for legislation on sterilization and euthanasia, these were rejected because it was believed that positive eugenics was more representative of the Weimar political structures and the nation's social needs. This approach ended in 1933 after the ascent of the Nazis in Germany, who implemented a eugenics programme based on their pseudoscientific racial theories.

In July 1933, the Nazis passed the "Law for the Prevention of Hereditarily Diseased Offspring", which prescribed compulsory sterilisation for people with medical conditions thought to be hereditary, such as schizophrenia and "imbecility". It is estimated that 360,000 people were sterilised under this law between 1933 and 1939.

== First phase of Aktion T4 ==
Beginning in late 1939, Hitler personally issued an order on his private stationery authorizing Philipp Bouhler and Karl Brandt to initiate a "euthanasia" programme to give the "incurably sick" a "mercy death". Developed by Viktor Brack, it began with mass sterilizations of children deemed "unfit" to reproduce. After that, the hospital staff exterminated children determined to be unfit and the programme was later expanded to adults. By January 1940, the Nazis had set up their first killing facilities. The clinic in Hadamar, which housed a psychiatric facility, was the last of six facilities set up to implement the programme, with murders commencing in January 1941. The staff cremated their 10,000th patient in the summer of 1941, celebrating with beer and wine. During the first phase of operations (January to August 1941), 10,072 men, women and children were murdered with carbon monoxide in a gas chamber as part of the Nazi "euthanasia" programme. The gas was obtained in standard cylinders supplied by the chemicals company IG Farben. The skies around Hadamar were often thick with smoke from the hospital crematorium.

Up to 100 victims arrived in post-buses every day. They were told to disrobe for a "medical examination". Sent before a physician, each was recorded as having one of 60 fatal diseases, as "incurables" were to be given a "mercy death". The doctor identified each person with different-coloured sticking plasters for one of three categories: murder; murder & remove brain for research; murder & extract gold teeth.

Families of the victims were sent "comfort letters" with falsified causes of death. Families could also request a funerary urn, but the ashes were not from their family member.

== Protests ==
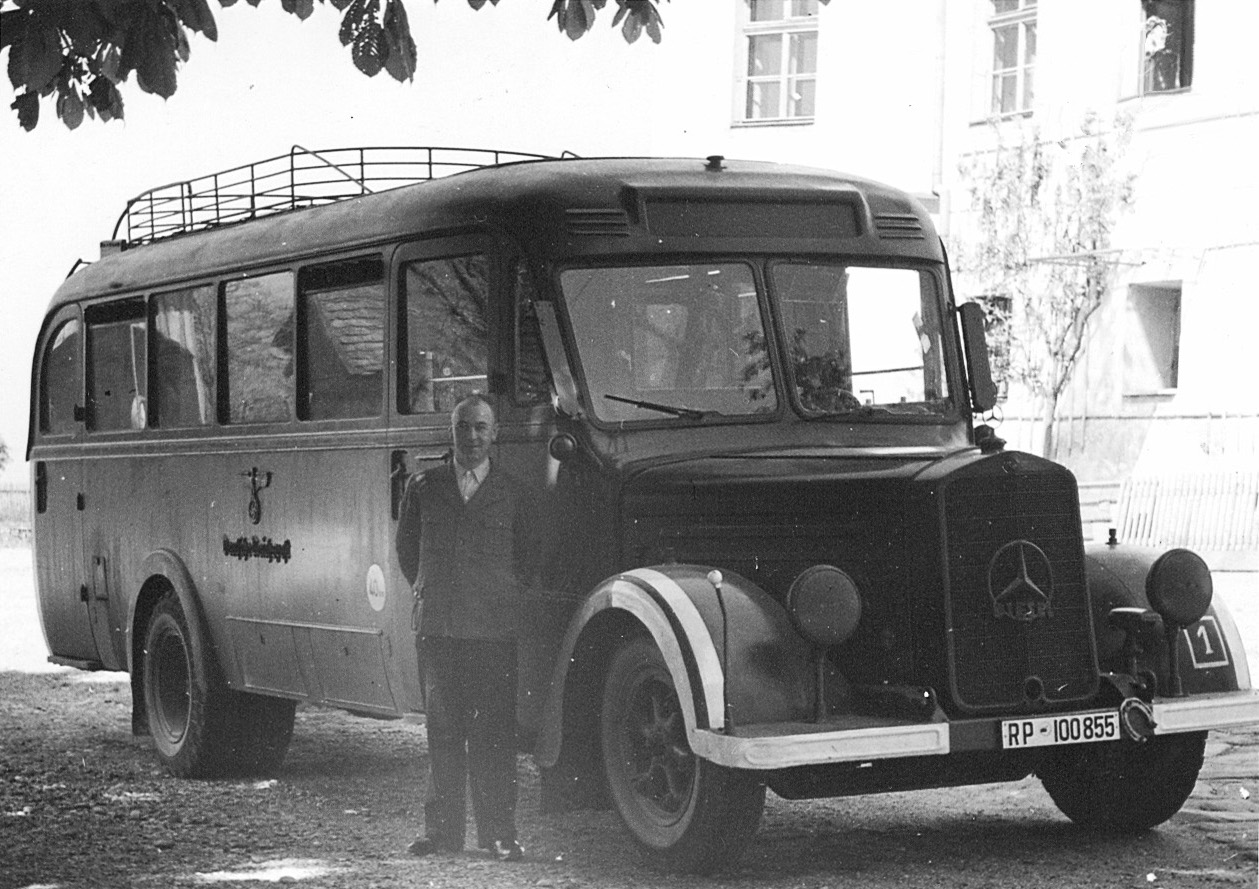
Gekrat bus and driver

Despite the hospital's precautions to cover up the T-4 programme, the local population were fully aware of events at the hospital. The people murdered in the Hadamar hospital were brought in by train and bus, apparently vanishing behind the site's high fencing. Since the crematorium ovens were more often than not fed with two corpses at a time, the cremation process was less than perfect. This often resulted in the aforementioned thick, acrid smog hanging over the town. According to a letter sent by Bishop Antonius Hilfrich of the Diocese of Limburg to the Reich Justice Minister in August 1941, local children taunted each other with the words "You're not very clever; you will go to Hadamar and into the ovens".

As people learned of these activities, especially the role of the "grey buses" in collecting victims, there was growing opposition. Fearing public unrest, Hitler officially announced in August 1941 that the "euthanasia" activities had been curtailed.

== Second phase of Aktion T4 ==
After nearly a year of suspension, the murder of 'undesirables' resumed in August 1942, in what has been termed the "decentralized euthanasia" phase of Aktion T4, where "euthanasia" killings were committed without centralized coordination from Berlin. Resident physicians and staff directly murdered the majority of these victims, among whom were German patients with disabilities, mentally-disoriented elderly persons from bombed-out areas, "half Jewish" children from welfare institutions, psychologically- and physically-disabled forced labourers and their children, German soldiers, and Waffen SS soldiers deemed psychologically incurable. Because the gas chamber had been deconstructed, the medical personnel and staff at Hadamar murdered almost all of these people by lethal drug overdoses or deliberate neglect and malnutrition.

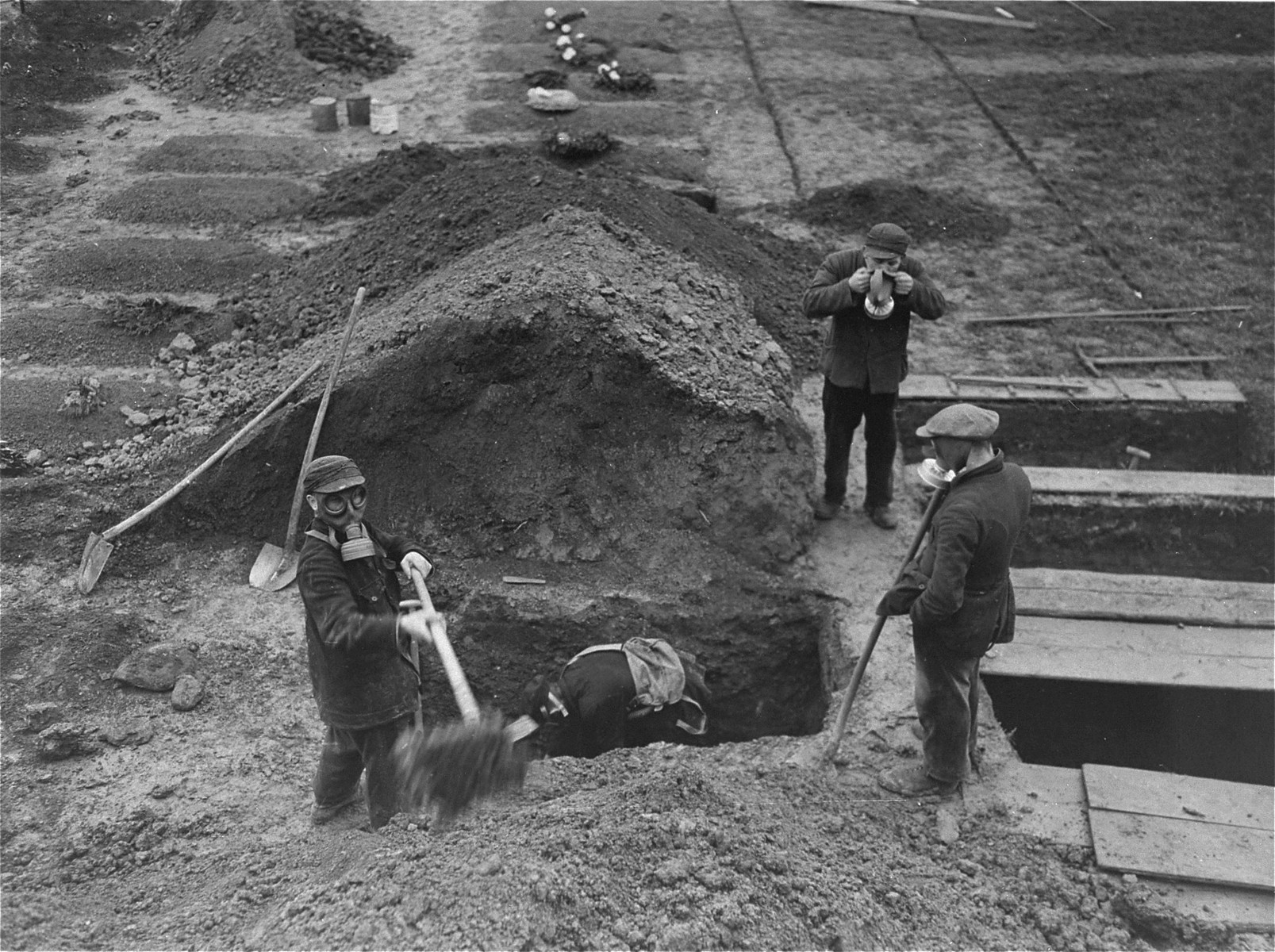
Exhumation of 44 Polish and Russian forced labourers murdered at Hadamar

The killings at Hadamar came to an end on 26 March 1945, when the town was liberated by units of the United States 2nd Infantry Division. Upon encountering the appalling conditions within the institution, the US Army initiated an immediate investigation. Senior members of the hospital staff who remained on site were taken into custody, witnesses were interviewed, and evidence was collected. Forensic experts, under the supervision of pathologist Major Herman Bolker, exhumed and examined bodies from mass graves located at the institution’s cemetery. The findings formed the basis for the first trial, held in October 1945 before a United States military court in Wiesbaden, in which members of the staff were prosecuted for their involvement in the murders.

During the second "decentralized" phase of Aktion T4, an estimated 4,500 victims were murdered at Hadamar.

== Hadamar Trial ==
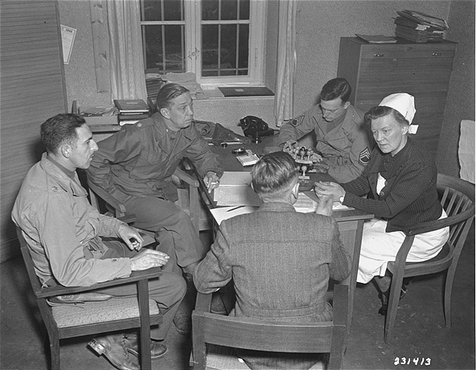
American war crimes investigators question nurse Irmgard Huber at the Hadamar Institute, May 1945.

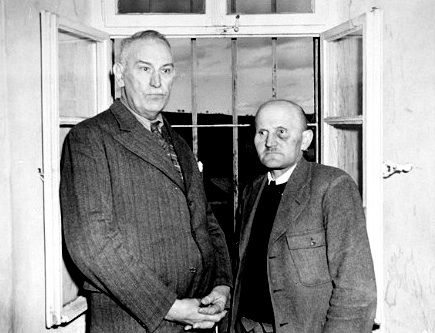
Wahlmann with Karl Willig (right) after their arrest in April 1945

The Hadamar Trial, 8–15 October 1945, was the first mass atrocity trial in the American occupation zone of Germany following World War II. In the first months of occupation, American military forces had conducted trials based on classical violations of international law, principally for the German murders of captured Allied service personnel, which had occurred in the last months of the war. The discovery in late March 1945 of the "euthanasia" facility Hadamar near Limburg an der Lahn in west central Germany riveted attention in the United States, with many local newspapers describing it as a "murder factory".

U.S. military authorities decided to undertake their first prosecution to adjudicate crimes associated with the systematic racial and social persecution and extermination committed under Nazi Germany policies. Initially, American authorities intended to try Hadamar physicians, nurses, and administrative staff in their custody for the murders of nearly 15,000 German patients at the institution. At the time, however, they lacked jurisdiction to do so under international law. U.S. military officials could not try German nationals for murdering their fellow citizens. International law restricted them to prosecute crimes committed against their own service personnel and civilian nationals, and those of their allies, in the territories that they held.

Among the Hadamar victims were 476 Soviet and Polish forced labourers. Identified as having tuberculosis, they were transported to Hadamar and murdered at the hospital in the last months of the war. As these civilian forced laborers were citizens of countries allied to the United States, American prosecutors were able to open proceedings against seven Hadamar defendants associated with the murders of the "Eastern workers". On 15 October 1945, chief United States prosecutor Leon Jaworski (who later gained prominence in the 1970s as Watergate Special Prosecutor), won convictions for all the accused. The six-man U.S. military tribunal sentenced the Hadamar chief administrator Alfons Klein, and two male nurses, Heinrich Ruoff and Karl Willig, to death by hanging. Chief physician Adolf Wahlmann received a life sentence with hard labor due to his old age (he was nearly 70) and poor health. Two Hadamar administrative staff received sentences of 35 and 30 years with hard labor, respectively. Irmgard Huber, a nurse and only female defendant, received the lightest sentence, that of 25 years imprisonment with hard labor. On 14 March 1946, Klein, Ruoff, and Willig were executed. In December 1945 the Allies promulgated Allied Control Council Law No. 10, which allowed the elastic charge of "crimes against humanity" to cover the massive scale of extermination the Germans had carried out against Jews, Poles, Gypsies and other populations. This charge was introduced in the indictment by the International Military Tribunal (IMT) at Nuremberg.

In early 1946, "euthanasia" crimes such as those at Hadamar were transferred to the German courts, newly reconstructed under the occupation. In early 1947, a German tribunal in Frankfurt tried 25 Hadamar personnel, including Wahlmann and Huber, for the murder of some 15,000 German patients at the facility. Although some had their sentences increased, they were all released early in the 1950s.

== Post-war use of the site ==
Today, the site houses a psychiatric hospital, the Vitos Klinik für Psychiatrie und Psychotherapie Hadamar, alongside the Hadamar Memorial Museum, which contains a memorial to the victims and an exhibition regarding the mass murders that took place on the site. Both the clinic and museum are operated by the State of Hessen.

== See also ==
- Nazi eugenics
- Gemeinnützige Krankentransport GmbH
- Am Spiegelgrund clinic
- Hartheim killing centre
- Scheuern Foundation

== Notes ==
This article incorporates text from the United States Holocaust Memorial Museum, and has been released under the GFDL.
