= Sheltered workshop =

Type of employment for disabled people

A sheltered workshop is an organization or environment that employs people with disabilities separately from others, usually with exemptions from certain labor standards, such as reduced minimum wage requirements. They offer vocational rehabilitation services.

Different groups hold different opinions about whether sheltered workshops should be available and what their purposes are.

== Description ==
A sheltered workshop is a program run like a business that generally employs people who are unable to obtain or keep employment on the competitive labor market due to disability. This typically includes people with intellectual disability. For the most part, workers come from special education school programs and are not expected to acquire the skills (e.g., working quickly) that are necessary to advance to employment on the competitive labor market. However, this is not universal; in transitional workshops, which are oriented for somewhat less disabled people, the goal is to prepare workers for competitive employment.

Activities usually involve low-skill, repetitive, routine, menial tasks, such as assembling things, preparing food, or cleaning. The workshops teach general work skills such as punctuality and dressing appropriately. Many programs also offer social and recreational activities.

The programs themselves usually fall into three general categories:

- Contracting: The workshop makes a contract to do a particular job for an organization, in return for a fee. For example, the workshop will contract to stuff envelopes for a mailing.
- Manufacturing: The workshop produces a product, which is sold. For example, the workers may paint decorative items that they sell in the organization's gift shop.
- Reclamation: The workshop salvages materials. For example, the workers might sort recyclable trash.

Sheltered workshops may be used in secure psychiatric facilities to teach residents skills (such as working in a group) that could be helpful for obtaining employment upon discharge.

Workshop employees usually produce less economic value than non-disabled workers and are either paid less than the ordinary minimum wage or are paid a minimum wage that is subsidized so that their pay exceeds the value of their output. Funding typically comes from a combination of government funding, philanthropy, and income from the sale of goods or services.

People who are too disabled for a sheltered workshop may participate in an adult day care, where the goal is improving basic life skills.

== History ==
The first sheltered workshops were created in the late 1830s. The workers were blind people.

In the earlier parts of the 20th century, sheltered workshops were generally used by disabled veterans and other people who had prior, successful work experience with marketable skills, and who were now adjusting to being disabled. Until the 1970s, most participants in a sheltered workshop had an acquired disability (e.g., a physical injury sustained during combat or during a car wreck). At that time, adults with intellectual disabilities or psychiatric disorders frequently were institutionalized and were not usually placed in formal work-related programs; if their residential institution engaged them in work-related activities, it was to provide physical exercise or to have a structured activity, rather than for the goal of acquiring skills for outside employment.

Later in the 20th century, as a result of the deinstitutionalization of people with serious mental illness, sheltered workshop programs had many more applicants with psychiatric or intellectual disabilities. This caused both a significant increase in the number of sheltered workshops and a shift in the role of sheltered workshops. Before this, a sheltered workshop was primarily a temporary, transitional employer for workers who were adjusting to a new, mainly physical disability and who were working as part of their recovery process. After this, sheltered workshops mostly became long-term employers for adults with lifelong disabling conditions. Eventually, many programs became a type of long-term adult day care program with some occupational activities, instead of a temporary job training center from which the worker was realistically expected to graduate. By the late 1980s, only one in 10 employees was expected to obtain competitive integrated employment.

== Purpose ==
The main goal of sheltered workshops is to provide a safe, predictable, stable work-related environment for participants. Beyond that, the purpose of a sheltered workshop has changed over time. Different groups have always had different ideas about what the main purpose of a sheltered workshop is. For example, taxpayers, funders, and donors frequently view sheltered workshops as subsidized social services programs. Participants might view themselves as being workers and therefore deserving the same pay and benefits as any other worker. Some parents of participants may view the main purpose as providing daytime care that allowed the parents to keep their own jobs. Program managers might hope to manage a workshop as a self-sustaining enterprise that needed, like any other business, to retain its most productive employees and remove less productive employees.

== Australia ==
Sheltered workshops are often called Australian Disability Enterprises (ADEs). In Australia, employees with intellectual disabilities make up 75% of the ADE workforce. The Australian Disability Enterprise sector in Australia generally has its roots in the early 1950s when families of people with disabilities established sheltered workshops to provide vocational activity for people with disability. At this time employment opportunities for people with disability were extremely limited.

In 1986, following the passage of the Commonwealth Disability Services Act (1986), Australia transitioned from the sheltered workshop system to the new model prioritizing employment for people with disabilities. In 1996, additional reforms were introduced for the purpose of improving service quality, matching service funding to the support needs of people with disability receiving assistance, and to link funding to employment outcomes. This led to a reform agenda in the ADE sector, with the introduction of legislated Quality Assurance standards that required ADEs to obtain independent verification of their compliance to these prior to receiving ongoing funding from the Australian Government. Additionally, a funding model that links payments to individual support needs was introduced.

In some ADEs individuals are paid as little as $1.79 an hour, based on the BSWAT (Business Services Wage Assessment Tool), which was found to be discriminatory in 2013, to be phased out by April 2015. Wages are based on a percentage of award rates, according to the workplace competencies and productivity of the person with a disability in comparison to a worker without a disability.

Following on from the court challenge on the discriminatory nature of the BSWAT, a large percentage of parents and employees of ADEs (along with the relevant Peak Body, National Disability Services) began a campaign to ensure their jobs were protected. Many raised the point that ADEs are not typical workplaces and provide significantly more support and opportunities than open employment workplaces. These parents, carers and employees were concerned that if ADEs were forced to pay full livable award wages for employees with a disability, many would be financially unsustainable. An episode of the ABC's Background Briefing in September 2014 stated that ADEs either barely make a profit or operate at a loss, and have to compete with low wage labor in other countries, which makes some people concerned that requiring them to pay higher wages will make those they employ unemployed, and unable to enjoy the many non-wage benefits of work like friendships and a sense of societal contribution.

== Canada ==
Before the 1960s, most Canadian sheltered workshops employed workers who had physical disabilities. By the late 1970s, however, three-quarters of the workshops employed workers with intellectual disability, many of them exclusively catering to this population. A survey in 1980 showed that there were about 600 sheltered workshops in Canada, and that they were employing about 25,000 people. Almost half were in Ontario. At that time, there were about 400 workshops for people with intellectual disabilities and about 40 for people with physical disabilities.

In Canada sheltered workshops are being phased out for supported employment but remain a predominant vocational model for people with intellectual disabilities, who have an employment rate of less than 30%.

== Europe ==
Sheltered workshops are a common form of employment provision for people with disabilities across Europe where their disabilities create barriers to accessing the open labour market. Traditional sheltered workshops offer long-term or permanent employment for people with disabilities whereas transitional sheltered workshops aim to develop workers' skills so that they can access non-sheltered employment in other workplaces. Government procurement law in the European Union makes special provision for contracting with sheltered workshops for the supply of goods and services to public authorities. Germany's federal decree on contracts for workshops for the disabled (10 May 2005) requires German federal contracting authorities to set aside part of their budgets for contracts which can be awarded to workshops for workers with disabilities.

== United Kingdom ==
In the U.K., the Disabled Persons (Employment) Act of 1944 founded a company primarily to help returning veterans return to work called Remploy. Remploy founded factories across the United Kingdom. In 1986, 55,000 disabled people had been employed in the factories at some point. However, the UK moved towards mainstream employment, rather than sheltered workshops. By 2013, all Remploy factories were closed.

The European Union's provision for contracting with sheltered workshops for the supply of goods and services to public authorities applied whilst the UK was part of the EU and is now embodied in section 32 of the Procurement Act 2023, where the relevant terminology refers to a "supported employment provider" where "disabled or disadvantaged individuals represent at least 30 per cent of the workforce of the organisation". Scottish guidance dating from 2010 states that every public body in Scotland should have "at least one contract" with such a "supported business".

== United States ==
The first sheltered workshop in the US was created in 1838 at the Perkins Institute for the Blind. The workers in these workshops were people who could not compete on the open labor market.

In the United States, an exemption in the Fair Labor Standards Act of 1938 allowed a lower minimum wage for people with disabilities, intended to help disabled World War I veterans have opportunities for employment. By 1948, there were 85 sheltered workshops in the US. By 1976, with deinstitutionalization underway in the United States, 3,000 sheltered workshops were in operation, at least half of which had been opened during the previous five years. Since then, non-profit organizations have hired disabled workers in sheltered workshops, with about 300,000 individuals working in this arrangement in 2015.

The Fair Labor Standards Act of 1938 established a minimum wage in the United States; Section 14(c) of the bill included an exception for people with disabilities, intended to help disabled World War I veterans have opportunities for employment. Employers who wish to pay less than minimum wage must acquire a certificate from the U.S. Department of Labor. The terms sheltered workshop and work center are used by the Wage and Hour Division of the Department of Labor for entities that are authorized to employ workers with disabilities at sub-minimum wages. These entities are generally non-profit facilities that exclusively or primarily employ people with disabilities, and also provide vocational rehabilitation services.

=== Movement to ban ===
By the 1980s, it was clear that the promise of a sheltered workshop leading to gainful employment was no longer being met, largely due to the clientele employed. People with physical disabilities – the original workforce for sheltered workshops – left the programs and found other approaches to vocational rehabilitation. Even programs, such as Skilcraft, that were successful in moving many disabled people into competitive integrated employment found over time that workers with multiple disabilities tended to remain in the sheltered workshops.

People with developmental disabilities who move into competitive employment may require ongoing services not paid for by the employer, such as a trained job coach to teach them each step of a job or to provide additional direct supervision. For example, one disabled worker obtained a grant-funded position that involved reporting misuse of disabled parking permits, but for him to do this work, the program then needed to hire a second, non-disabled employee to drive him to different parking lots.

In 2020, the United States Commission on Civil Rights issued a report which recommends that the minimum wage exemption be phased out.

The issue of whether sheltered workshops should exist is a contentious issue within the disability services community. Advocates of disability rights say that the low pay, the lack of training, and the few opportunities for advancement trap disabled people in those jobs and reduce their independence. They also say that the programs are inherently discriminatory because they segregate disabled workers into separate work environments. They favor competitive integrated employment, in which people with disabilities work in ordinary businesses, for ordinary pay, with some additional training or accommodations. Many people with severe disabilities cannot perform at the level of an ordinary worker (e.g., cannot fold as many shirts or wash as many dishes in a day), but self-advocates see the minimum wage fight as having less to do with tangible worker productivity and more to do with their paycheck showing that they are equally valued members of society.

Disability service providers, almost all of which are non-profits, as well as many parents and disabled workers themselves support the workshops and state that eliminating the minimum wage exemption would eliminate those jobs and the choice to work at all (because many adults with severe disabilities will never be able to successfully compete with an ordinary worker) and thereby enjoy the many non-wage benefits of work (like a sense of pride for their societal contribution), and replace it with adult day care or "glorified babysitting". Some parents and caregivers rely on the sheltered workshops so that they can work, sleep, or care for themselves, or for the benefit of getting their children out of the house to see other people. These programs often also offer Medicaid benefits. Alternative respite care and adult daycare programs are often unavailable.

On a national level, Congressional legislation that would phase out subminimum wages has been proposed multiple times unsuccessfully. Most recently, the Transformation to Competitive Integrated Employment Act (TCIEA) was introduced in 2021.

At the state level, Vermont was the first state to ban subminimum wages and sheltered workshops since 2002. By 2023, fourteen states had passed laws banning subminimum wages. At least four no longer have any sheltered workshops. Advocates have pointed to individuals who have been successful in competitive integrated employment; parents have pointed to people who are now unemployed, work fewer hours, or have been placed in adult day care programs. In 2022, a year after California adopted a phased-in ban on paying disabled people less than state's minimum wage, more than 80% of developmentally disabled persons in California were unemployed.
