= Women in Nazi Germany =

Nazi policies regarding the role of women in German society

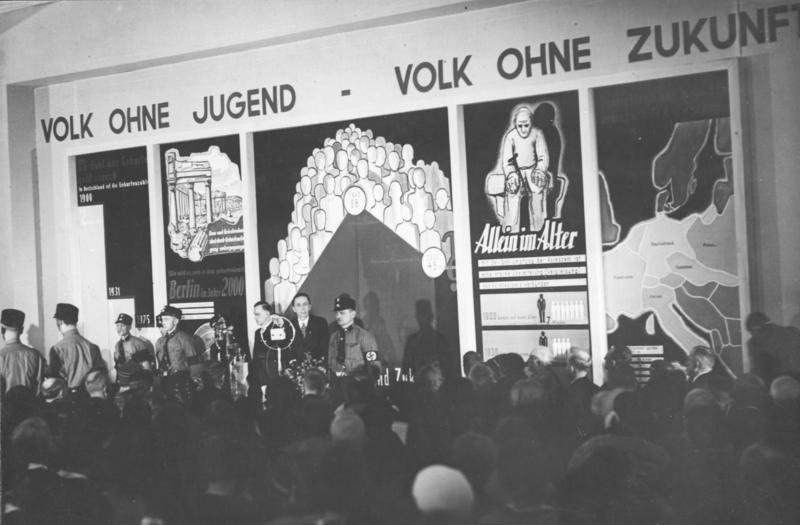
Opening of exposition Die Frau, Frauenleben und -wirken in Familie, Haus und Beruf (Women: the life of women, their role in the family, at home and at work) at the Kaiserdamm, March 18, 1933, with Minister of Propaganda Joseph Goebbels

In Nazi Germany, women were subject to doctrines of Nazism by the Nazi Party (NSDAP), which promoted exclusion of women from the political and academic life of Germany as well as its executive body and executive committees. On the other hand, whether through sheer numbers, lack of local organization, or both, many German women did indeed become Nazi Party members. In spite of this, the Nazi regime officially encouraged and pressured women to fill the roles of mother and wife only. Women were excluded from all other positions of responsibility, including political and academic spheres. Nazism rejected feminism as "anti-German".

The policies contrasted starkly with the evolution of women's rights and gender equality under the Weimar Republic, but is also distinguishable from the conservative attitude under the German Empire. The regimentation of women at the heart of satellite organizations of the Nazi Party, as the Bund Deutscher Mädel or the NS-Frauenschaft, had the ultimate goal of encouraging the cohesion of the "people's community" (Volksgemeinschaft).

The ideal woman in Nazi Germany did not have a career outside her home. Instead, she was a good wife, a careful and conscientious mother (taking special care to raise her children in accordance with Nazi philosophies and ideals), and skilled at doing all domestic chores such as cleaning and cooking. Women had a limited right to training of any kind; such training usually revolved around domestic tasks. Over time, Nazi-era German women were restricted from teaching in universities, working as medical professionals, and serving in political positions within the NSDAP. With the exception of Reichsführerin Gertrud Scholtz-Klink, women were not permitted to carry out official functions. However, there were some notable exceptions, either through their proximity to Adolf Hitler, such as Magda Goebbels, or by excelling in particular fields, such as filmmaker Leni Riefenstahl or aviator Hanna Reitsch. Many restrictions on women were lifted once wartime necessity required policy changes later in the regime.

The historiography of "ordinary" German women in Nazi Germany has changed significantly over time; studies done just after World War II tended to see them as additional victims of Nazi oppression. However, during the late 20th century, historians began to argue that German women were able to influence the course of the regime and even the war. In addition, these studies found women's experiences during the Nazi regime varied by class, age and religion.

While many women played an influential role at the heart of the Nazi system or filled official posts at the heart of the Nazi concentration camps, a few were engaged in the German resistance and paid with their lives, such as Libertas Schulze-Boysen and Sophie Scholl.

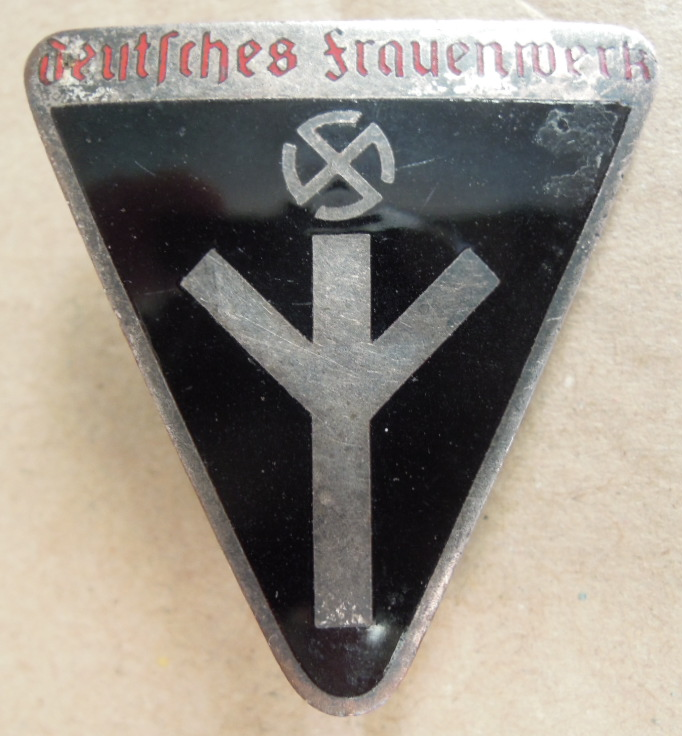
Membership badge of the Deutsches Frauenwerk, a Nazi association for women founded in October 1933

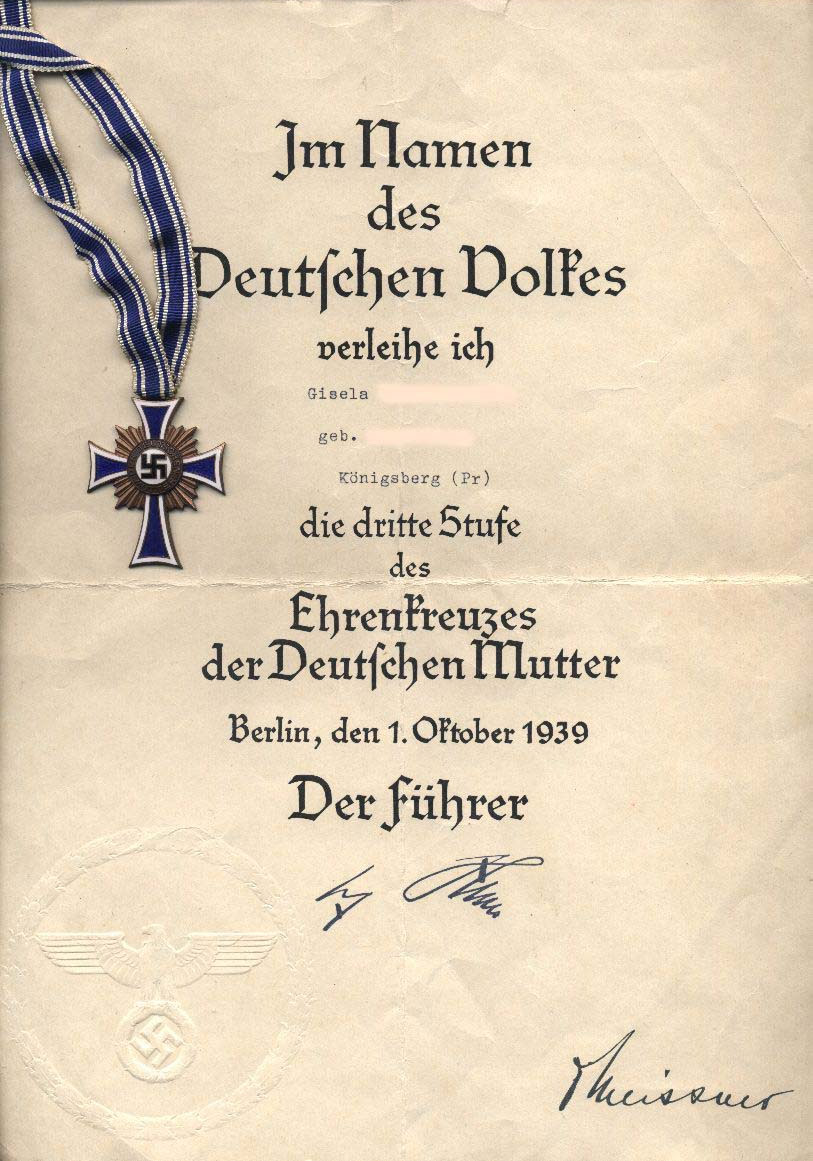
Certificate of the Cross of Honour of the German Mother during World War II

== Background ==
Under the Weimar Republic, the status of women was one of the most progressive in Europe. The Weimar Constitution of January 19, 1919 proclaimed their right to vote (articles 17 and 22), equality of the sexes in civic matters (art. 109), non-discrimination against female bureaucrats. (art. 128), maternity rights (art. 19) and spousal equality within marriage (art. 119). Clara Zetkin, a prominent leader of the German feminist movement, was a Member of Parliament in the Reichstag from 1920 to 1933 and even presided over the assembly in the role of Dean. But Weimar did not represent a huge leap forward for women's liberation. Women remained under-represented in the parliament; motherhood continued to be promoted as women's most important social function; abortion was still prosecutable (§ 218 of the Criminal Code); and female workers did not achieve substantial economic progress such as equal salaries. With the emergence of consumerism, businesses and government had an increasing need for labour; although work became a route to emancipation for women, they were often restricted to clerical work as secretaries or sales staff, where they were generally paid 10 to 20% less than male employees, under various pretexts, such as the claim that their understanding of domestic tasks freed them from certain household expenses.

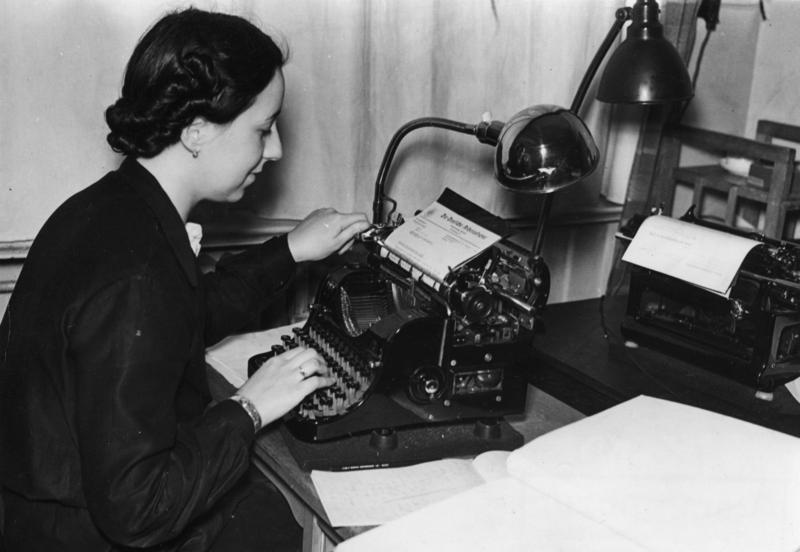
German woman secretary, in 1938

While most of the other parties under the Weimar Republic ran female candidates during elections (and some were elected), the Nazi party did not. In 1933, Joseph Goebbels justified this position by explaining that "it is necessary to leave to men that which belongs to men ". Germany went from having 37 female Members of Parliament out of 577, to none, after the election of November 1933.

=== Beginning of the Nazi regime ===
Adolf Hitler's attaining power as Chancellor marked the end of numerous women's rights, even though Hitler had succeeded in his social rise in part thanks to the protection of influential women and female voters. Hitler's socializing within affluent circles, and with socialites such as Princess Elsa Bruckmann, wife of the editor Hugo Bruckmann, and Helene Bechstein, wife of industrialist Edwin Bechstein, early on brought the Nazi party significant new sources of financing. For example, Gertrud von Seidlitz, a widow of a noble family, donated 30,000 marks to the party in 1923; and Helene Bechstein, who had an estate on the Obersalzberg, facilitated Hitler's acquisition of the property Wachenfeld.

In regards to the role played by women voters in Hitler's rise to power, Helen Boak notes that the "NSDAP had been gaining proportionately more support from women than from men from 1928 onwards, not because of any concerted effort on its part nor because of its leader's charisma nor because of one specific element of its propaganda. Women chose to vote NSDAP for the same reasons men voted for the party – out of self-interest, out of a belief that the party best represented their own idea of what German society should be, even if they may have disagreed with the party's stand on individual issues. The larger increase in the share of women's votes than in that of men's votes cast for the NSDAP from 1928 owes much to the party's growing prominence and respectability, as the party's dynamism, the contrast of its young leadership with the elder statesmen of the other parties, its growing strength, the disintegration of the liberal and local, conservative parties and the general disillusionment and dissatisfaction with what the [Weimar] Republic had brought or failed to bring all contributed to the reasons why German men and women turned to the NSDAP...Because of the preponderance of women in the electorate, the NSDAP received more votes from women than from men in some areas before 1932 and throughout the Reich in 1932. Claims that Hitler and his party held no attraction for women voters and that the NSDAP benefitted little from female suffrage cannot, therefore, be maintained. Historian Wendy Lower makes it clear that while "Women were not a majority of those who voted for Hitler...In the presidential election of March 1932...26.5% [of German women voted] for Hitler. In the 1931 September elections, 3 million women voted for NSDAP candidates, almost half of the total of 6.5 million votes cast for the NSDAP." In terms of voting patterns however, a higher proportion of male voters supported the Nazi party compared to female voters.

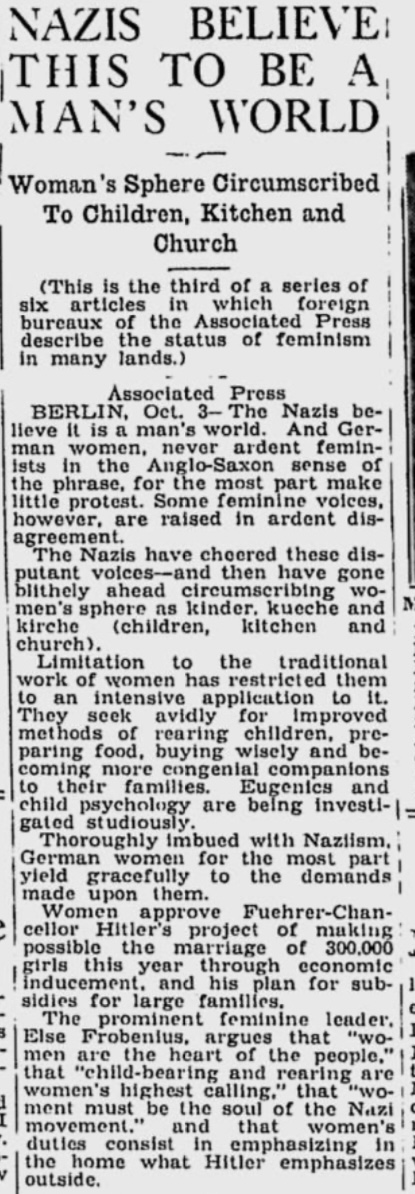
"Nazis Believe This To Be A Man's World" Associated Press report from October 1934 on the situation of women's rights in Germany

In 1934, speaking at a conference of the National Socialist Women's Organization in Nuremberg, Hitler dencounced the "women's liberation movement" and blamed Jews for it. He went on to say "In the truly good times of German life the German woman never had to liberate herself" and that Germany needed women "...who look at the duties with which nature burdens all of us."

In 1935, during a speech to the National-Socialist Women's Congress, Hitler declared, with regard to women's rights:

in reality, the granting of so-called equal rights to women, as demanded by Marxism, does not confer equal rights at all, but constitutes the deprivation of rights, since they draw women into a zone where they can only be inferior. It places women in situations where they cannot strengthen their position with regard to men and with society – but it only weakens them.

The fact that Hitler was unmarried and that he represented a masculine ideal for many Germans led to his erotisation in the public imagination. In April 1923, an article appeared in the Münchener Post stating "women adore Hitler "; he was described as adapting his speeches to "the tastes of women who, since the beginning, count among his most fervent admirers". Women were also sometimes instrumental in bringing their husbands into the Nazi political fold, thus contributing to the recruitment of new NSDAP members. Heinrich Himmler declared as much to the SS-Gruppenführer, on February 18, 1937:

On the whole, in my view, we have too much masculinized our life, to the point that we are militarizing impossible things [...] For me, it is a catastrophe that women's organizations, women's communities and women's societies intervene in a domain that destroys all feminine charm, all the feminine majesty and grace. For me, it is a catastrophe that we other poor male fools – I speak generally, because this does not mean you directly, we want to make women an instrument of logical thought, to educate them in everything possible, that we want to masculinize with time the difference between the sexes, the polarity will disappear. The path to homosexuality is not far. [...] We must be very clear. The movement, the ideology cannot be sustained if it is worn by women, because man conceives of everything through the mind, whereas women grasp everything through sentiment. [...] The priests burned 5,000 to 6,000 women [for witchcraft], because they preserve emotionally the ancient wisdom and ancient teachings, and because, emotionally, they do not let go, whereas men, they are logically and rationally disposed.

Himmler also stated a balance was needed between and the "excessive military and male orientation of German life and German youth" and chivalry towards women, "as knights and cavaliers who treated women respectfully", as he believed too much of the former would lead to homosexuality, and too much of the latter would lead to Germany becoming like "the Anglo-Saxon nations, especially America" where he claimed men were "in slavery to their womenfolk, the best example of a female tyranny!" He even went as far as to claim men had to pay damages or marry a girl in America just for looking at her and that this led to men embracing homosexuality, concluding that the women were "battle-axes" hacking away at the males.

Officially, the status of women changed from "equal rights" (Gleichberechtigung) to an "equivalence" between men and women (Gleichstellung). Historian Pierre Ayçoberry points out that "this offensive offered the double advantage of pleasing their male colleagues worried by this competition, and returned to private life more than 100,000 people proud of their success, the majority of whom were voters who supported the political left". This policy created worry among the militants in the NSDAP, who were concerned that it would harm the number of female graduates, a reservoir needed for future party ranks.

=== Withdrawal from higher education ===
In 1933, school programmes for girls were changed, notably with the goal of discouraging them from pursuing university studies. The five years of Latin classes and three years of science were replaced by courses in German language and domestic skills training. This did not bear productive results; on the one hand, a significant number of girls enrolled in boys' schools, while on the other hand, the "enrollment restrictions" of 10% at the university level were generally ignored. Thus, the measures only decreased the enrollment in medical schools from 20% to 17%.

Some women's associations, notably communist and socialist groups were banned, and in some rare cases members were arrested or assassinated. All associations were requested to turn in Jewish members, such as the Union of Protestant Women, the Association of Household and Countryside, the Women's German Colonial Society Union and the Union of Queen Louise. But rapidly, the majority of the associations disbanded or chose among themselves to disappear, such as the BDF (Bund Deutscher Frauenverein), established in 1894 and which disbanded in 1933 to avoid being controlled. Only one women's association persisted under the regime (the association of Gertrud Bäumer, Die Frau, or Woman), until 1944, but placed under the guardianship of the Reich Minister of People's Education and of Propaganda, Joseph Goebbels. Rudolf Hess established the Deutsches Frauenwerk which, with the women's branch of the Nazi party, the NS-Frauenschaft, had the purpose of becoming a mass organization for the regime.

In 1936, a law was passed banning certain high-level positions in the judicial system to women (notably judge and prosecutor, through Hitler's personal intervention) and the medical field. Female doctors were no longer allowed to practice, until their loss had a harmful effect on health needs and some were recalled to work; also dissolved was the Association of Medical Women, which was absorbed into its male counterpart. Under the Weimar Republic, only 1% of university posts were filled by women. On June 8, 1937, a decree stipulated that only men could be named to these posts, if it was not in a social field. Nonetheless, on February 21, 1938 "in an individual and exceptional capacity" following lobbying by Gertrud Scholtz-Klink, one female scientist Margarete Gussow obtained a post in astronomy. Mathematician Ruth Moufang was able to receive her doctorate, but could not obtain the right to teach and was forced to work for national industry. Emmy Noether, another mathematician, was terminated from her post by virtue of the "German law for the Restoration of the Public Service" of April 7, 1933, for having been active in the 1920s in the USPD and the SPD. Physics researcher Lise Meitner, who directed the Department of Physics at the Kaiser Wilhelm Society, was able to remain in her post until 1938, but this was only due to her Austrian nationality, which ended with the Anschluss); she then left for the Netherlands, and then Sweden. In the scientific field, there were almost no nominations of women; in 1942, a woman was not permitted to direct a scientific institute, despite the fact that no male candidate had applied. The exile of women from political life was total: they could not sit in either the Reichstag, the regional parliaments or municipal councils.

There was no substantial resistance to this control. The bourgeois women's associations reasoned, as did many others, that the Nazi government was a vulgar phenomenon that would soon fade, and that through their participation they could still exert some influence. They thus deluded themselves into believing that they were obtaining an "acceptable arrangement". With respect to the widespread tendency to underestimate the threat that the regime presented, the historian Claudia Koonz highlights the popular proverb of the era: "The soup is never eaten as hot as it is cooked". Women who were the most resolute in their opposition either set their sights on emigration, or, if they took an active stance, risked being arrested and interned, and possibly executed, the same as male opponents of the regime.

=== Partial recovery of 1937 ===
Noticing the need for women in certain professions and their usefulness in the country's economy, the anti-emancipation policy in terms of the workforce was rapidly blunted. Women were otherwise invited to adhere to Nazism and reassured with the idea that they could be a mother and be employed, Joseph Goebbels even attacking anti-lipstick propaganda campaigns in Völkischer Beobachter and attacking the most zealous ideologues.

== Nazi feminine ideal ==
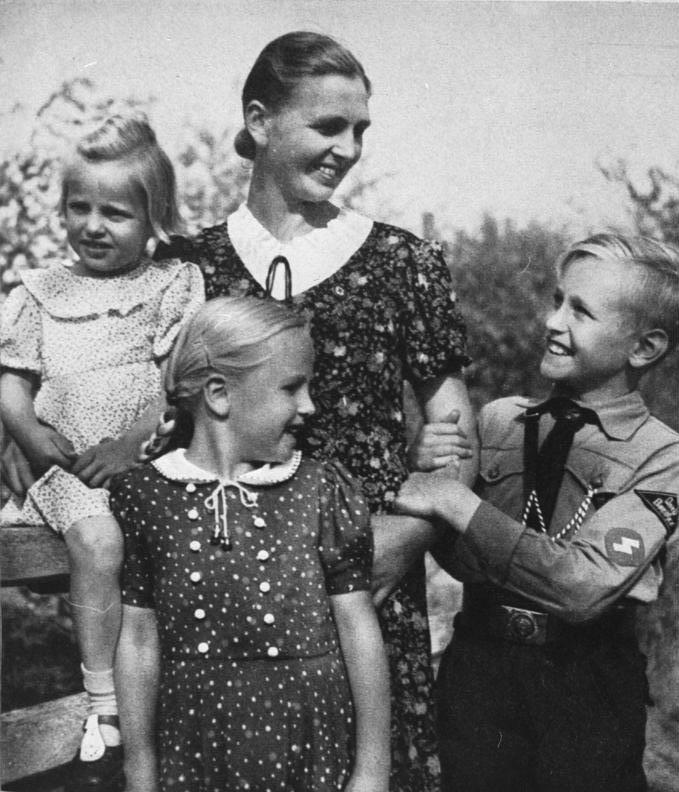
Nazi propaganda photo: A mother, her daughters and her son in the uniform of the Hitler Youth pose for the magazine SS-Leitheft February 1943.

=== New Woman ===
The Nazi woman was an important part of Adolf Hitler's vision of German society (the Volksgemeinschaft) and should mirror its ideals: racially pure and physically robust. She should not work outside of the home, and should be devoted to motherhood, following the slogan of the former emperor Wilhelm II of Germany: Kinder, Küche, Kirche, meaning "Children, kitchen, church". In a document published in 1934, The Nine Commandments of the Workers' Struggle, Hermann Goering bluntly summarizes the future role of German women: "Take a pot, a dustpan and a broom and marry a man". These ideals were embodied in various Nazi institutions such as the bride schools of the Deutsches Frauenwerk, aimed primarily at prospective brides of SS and Nazi Party members, and the Faith and Beauty Society for women aged 17 to 21.

This was anti-feminism in the sense that the Nazis considered political rights granted to women (access to high-level positions for example) as incompatible with the nature of reproduction, the only role within which they could blossom and best serve the interests of the nation. Magda Goebbels declared in 1933: "German women were excluded from three professions: the army, as elsewhere in the world; the government; and the judiciary. If a German girl must choose between marriage or a career, she will always be encouraged to marry, because that is what is best for a woman".

=== Prohibitions and obligations ===
The wearing of makeup was generally prohibited, and a certain modesty was demanded of women, contrasting with the Weimar Republic period, which experienced more freedom on a moral level. In 1933, meetings of the NSBO (part of the German Workers' Front) proclaimed that women "painted and powdered were forbidden at all meetings of the NSBO. Women who smoke in public – in hotels, cafés, in the street and so on – will be excluded from NSBO". Activities considered traditional were encouraged only in appropriate places: music, manual labour, gymnastics. Sexuality was banned, unless for a reproductive goal; liberated young women were considered "depraved" and "antisocial". Mothers were encouraged to have children, and the "Ehrenkreuz der Deutschen Mutter" (in English: Cross of Honour of the German Mother) was created for mothers having more than four children. A "German Mothers' Day" was also created, and in 1939, three million mothers were decorated on that day. Concerning abortion, access to services was quickly prohibited, and in 1935, the medical profession became obliged to report stillbirths to the Regional Office for State Health, who would further investigate the loss of a child. In 1943 the ministers of the Interior and Justice enacted the law "Protection of Marriage, Family and Motherhood", which made provisions for the death penalty for mothers convicted of infanticide.

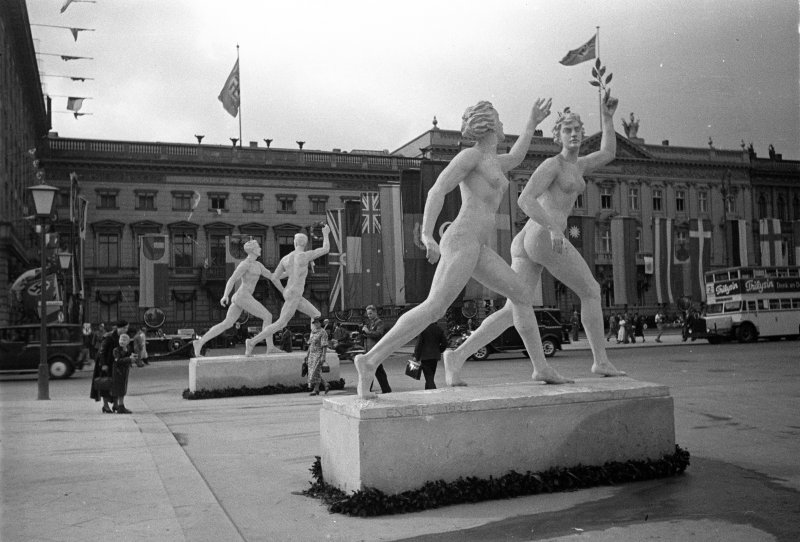
Statues of the ideal female body in the streets of Berlin, raised on the occasion of the 1936 Summer Olympics

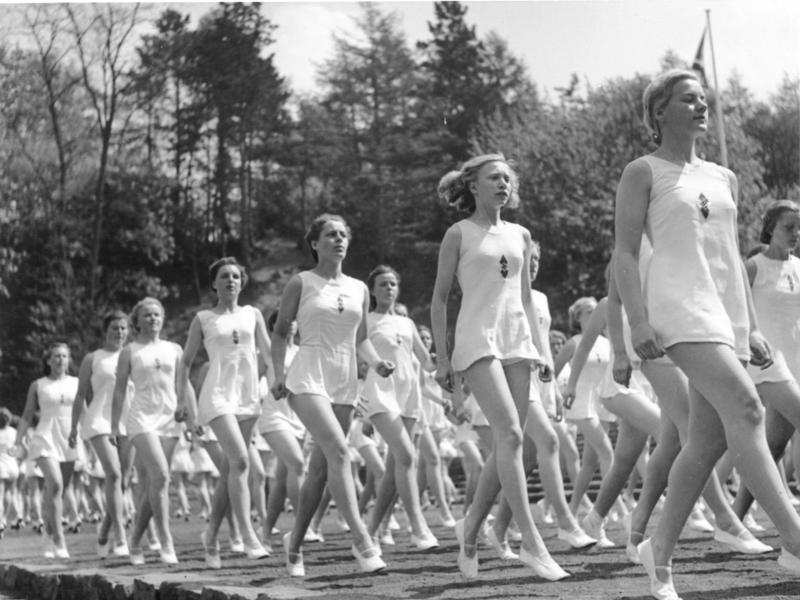
Young women of the BDM practising gymnastics in 1941

=== Physical standards ===
In line with Nazi racial theory, the Nazi government promoted the "Aryan" (Nordic) archetype as the ideal physical appearance: women were to be blonde, blue-eyed, beautiful, tall, thin and robust. This image was spread as much through advertising as through official art, then through ancient art, and more specifically through Greco-Roman statues. Academic Monique Moser-Verrey notes: "a revival, during the course of the Thirties, of mythological themes such as the Judgement of Paris." Moser-Verrey notes however:

Yet it is striking that the image of women projected by women's literature of the 1930s is clearly contrary to traditional views of sweet housewife spread by Rosenberg and Goebbels. The heroines of women's novels during this period are often a strong and tenacious type of woman, while the sons and husbands are quickly delivered to death. Everything happens as if one perceives through these fictions a true antagonism between the sexes generated by the constant mobilisation of these two groups independent of one another.

=== Fashion ===
Fashion for women in Nazi Germany was problematic for Nazi officials. The Nazi government wanted to propagandize the "Aryan" woman. In various posters and other forms of media, this ideal Nazi woman was strong, fertile, and wore historically traditional German clothing. However, Nazi officials also did not want to hinder the German clothing or fashion industries from making profits, as the government also sought to create a consumerist society based for the most part on German domestic products. These differences in goals often led to disparities in what was considered fashionable, nationalistic, and politically correct for women in Nazi Germany.

However, although there was disagreement over how to ideally fashion German "Aryan" women, anti-Semitic, anti-American, and anti-French Nazi rhetoric played a key part in molding German women's fashion ideology. The Nazis severely criticized the Western fashions of the 1920s, claiming the Jazz Flapper fashion to be "French-dominated" and "severely Jewish." Additionally, the Nazi Party was strictly against the Flapper style because they felt it masculinized women and created an immoral image. The desire to abolish 1920s fashion in Nazi Germany was consistent with Nazi propaganda which was insistent on limiting women to the private sphere as housewives and mother figures.

While the Nazi government sought to create a maternal ideal for the Aryan woman, they also sought financial gain from the textile industry. While Hitler urged women to buy more products, he stipulated that women must only consume German products. The creation of the German Fashion Institute (Deutsches Modeamt) sought to create a Western high-fashion niche market, creating varying opinions on how fashion and Nazi politics should interact.

== Regimentation of women ==
The compulsory education for girls was not neglected and both boys and girls were placed on the same footing at schools. Girls were encouraged to pursue secondary education but university courses were closed to them. Beginning in 1935 they were required to fulfill a work period of six months for the benefit of the service of women's work, the Reichsarbeitsdienst Deutscher Frauenarbeitsdienst. Adolf Hitler declared, on April 12, 1942, that the schools of the Reich must gather "boys and girls from all classes" to meet "all the youth of the Reich". The education manual Das kommende Deutschland notes that:

The Jungmädel (young girl) must know a) the date and place of the birth of the Führer, and be able to recount his life. b) She is capable of recounting the history of the movement and the struggle of the SA and the Hitler Youth. c) She knows the living collaborators of the Führer."

It was also required that they know the geography of Germany, its hymns as well as the clauses of the Treaty of Versailles.

The BDM was particularly regarded as instructing females to avoid Rassenschande (racial defilement), which was treated with particular importance for young females in order to preserve the Aryan race. During the war, repeated efforts were made to propagate Volkstum ("racial consciousness"), to prevent sexual relations between Germans and any foreign workers. Nazi propaganda published pamphlets that enjoined all German women to avoid sexual relations with all foreign workers brought to Germany as a danger to their blood. German women accused of racial defilement were paraded through the streets with a shaved head and placard around her neck detailing her crime. Those convicted were sent to a concentration camp. When Himmler reportedly asked Hitler what the punishment should be for German girls and German women who have been found guilty of race defilement with prisoners of war (POWs) he ordered "every POW who has relations with a German girl or a German would be shot" and the German woman should be publicly humiliated by "having her hair shorn and being sent to a concentration camp".

Robert Gellately in The Gestapo and German Society. Enforcing Racial Policy 1933–1945 writes about such cases of German women being found guilty of sexual relations with prisoners of war and foreigner workers. One case in March 1941 was of a married woman who had an affair with a French prisoner of war had her head shaved and was marched through the town of Bramberg in Lower Franconia carrying a sign which said, "I have sullied the honour of the German woman." Another case was Dora von Calbitz who in September 1940 was found guilty of having sexual relations with a Pole. She had her head shaved and was placed in the pillory of her town of Oschatz near Leipzig, with a sign that proclaimed, "I have been a dishonourable German woman in that I sought and had relations with Poles. By doing that I excluded myself from the community of the people."

The education of girls also meant political education; there already existed elite schools of political studies, the Napola (Nationalpolitische Anstalten), one for girls opened in 1939 in Vienna and another in 1942 in Luxembourg. These institutions did not have a purpose of enabling women to re-enter political life but of endowing the best with the cultural baggage required to occupy posts related to the management of women's affairs. This concerned a very small minority. However, on June 5, 1942, the Minister of Finance Lutz Schwerin von Krosigk, a conservative politician, threatened to cut grants to the second school, if it did not become a simple internship for adolescents, rejecting all political education for girls. Adolf Hitler decided otherwise on June 24, 1943, promising the construction of three new Napola.

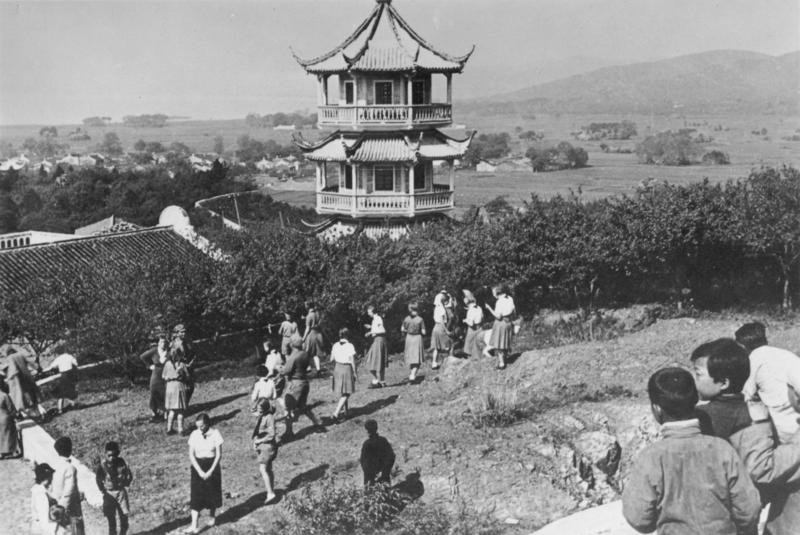
Members of the BDM at a vacation camp at Wuxi, in the Republic of China, 1934

When the Hitler Youth was devoted to organizing the extra-curricular life of male adolescents, the Bund Deutscher Mädel (BDM), occupied female adolescents from 14 to 18 years. Founded in 1934, the movement was needed after the law of December 1, 1936. It was led from 1934 to 1937 by Trude Mohr, then from 1937 to 1945 by the psychologist Jutta Rüdiger. Young girls were trained for certain employment (social work, cleaning) or farming (Ernteeinsatz, harvesting) and practised sports; as the education manual Das kommende Deutschland shows, the physical performance demanded was sometimes the same as those of the boys (for example, to run 60 meters in less than 12 seconds). Every Wednesday evening, for girls from 15 to 20 years old, the "home parties" took place, for discussing art and culture. Vacation camps, held for one week during Summer, in Germany or abroad, were organized. There also existed a required six-month work service, the Reichsarbeitsdienst der weiblichen Jugend (National Young Women's Work Service), completed in 1941 with six extra months in the Kriegshilfsdienst (for the war effort). For young women aged 18 to 25 years old wishing to find work, in 1938 the Pflichtjahr was instituted, one year of obligatory service in farming or domestic work.

=== National Socialist Women's League ===
Service flag for women's work (Deutscher Frauenarbeitsdienst)

Women could be members of the Nazi Party, but newcomers to the party were only admitted if they were "useful" (nurses or cooks for example). They numbered 5% of women in 1933 and 17% in 1937. But since October 1931 the NS-Frauenschaft (NSF) existed, the political organization for Nazi women, that sought above all to promote the ideal of the model woman of Nazi Germany; at its foundation, it was responsible for training in housekeeping. Young women joined when they were 15 years old. On 31 December 1932, the NSF counted 109,320 members. In 1938, it had 2 million, corresponding to 40% of the total number of party members. The NSF was directed by Gertrud Scholtz-Klink, who had the title of Reichsführerin; she called the members "my daughters" and acquired a strong influence over them and a certain credibility. Her views on women were obviously in agreement with those of Adolf Hitler, but she still defended access to some positions of responsibility. She did not participate in major meetings of the party but was invited to the party congress.

School textbooks were edited beginning in 1934, often under the supervision of the doctor Johanna Haarer, an author notably for The German Mother and Her First Baby, which was widely published, and promoting the driving role of the German mother in building the regime, or Mother, tell me about Adolf Hitler (Mutter, erzähl von Adolf Hitler), to lead women to instill their children with Nazi values:

Original German	English translation
Noch eines sollt ihr Kinder lernen aus der langen Geschichte, die ich euch von Adolf Hitler erzählt habe: Ihr, Fritz und Hermann, müßt erst ganze deutsche Jungen werden, die in der HJ ihren Platz ausfüllen, und später tüchtige und mutige deutsche Männer, damit ihr es auch wert seid, daß Adolf Hitler euer Führer ist. Du Gertrud, mußt ein rechtes deutsches Mädel sein, ein richtiges BDM-Mädel und später eine rechte deutsche Frau und Mutter, damit auch du dem Führer jederzeit in die Augen sehen kannst.	One more thing shall you children learn from the long history that I have told you about Adolf Hitler: You, Fritz and Hermann, must only be German boys who fill their place in the Hitler Youth, and later become capable and courageous German men so that you will be worthy to have Adolf Hitler for your Führer. You Gertrude, must be a proper German girl, a real BDM girl and later a proper German wife and mother, so that you also are able to look the Führer in the eyes.

Housekeeping training was promoted through Frauenwerk (German Women's Work), which opened thematic courses for "ethnically pure" women. It is notable, however, that although there were numerous courses for domestic training, gymnastics and music, they deserted those oriented towards antireligious teaching.

The NS-Frauenschaft "played no political role and did not oppose the loss of hard-won women's rights. It defended the role of the mother of the family at home, conscious of their duties at the heart of the community. Provided, containing women within the private sphere does not hide their responsibilities under the Third Reich; we know today that the Frauenbewegung (women's movement) thought the place of a woman in society was at the heart of a community that excluded Jews and performed a civilizing mission in occupied Eastern Europe to preserve the race".

== Second World War ==
During the Second World War, temporarily contradicting their past claims, the Nazis changed policy and allowed women to join the German army, although only for non-combat auxiliary roles. Adolf Hitler had already affirmed in a speech to activists of the National Socialist Women's League on September 13, 1936: "We possess a generation of healthy men – and we, National Socialists, are going to watch – Germany will not form any section of women grenade throwers or any corps of women elite snipers." Therefore, women were not assigned to combat units during the war, but were regarded as auxiliary military personnel, responsible for logistical and administrative duties in the areas understaffed due to the number of men sent into combat. Other women also worked in factories or in military education. Military members of the Reichsbahn (National Company of Railways) or the Feuerwehr (firefighters) wore uniforms appropriate to the era, especially with a skirt. Gertrud Scholtz-Klink, NSDAP member and leader of the National Socialist Women's League stated:

We often hear, even from the women, the most diverse objections against work in arms factories. The question of knowing whether we can require such work of this or that particular woman is now well past.

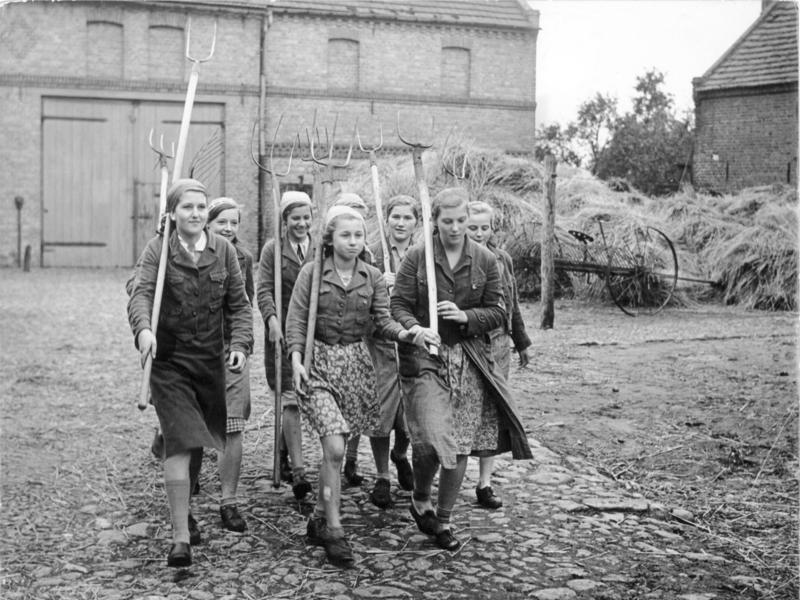
The caption in the propaganda magazine Das Deutsche Mädel (May 1942 issue) states: "bringing all the enthusiasm and life force of their youth, our young daughters of the Work Service make their contribution in the German territories 'regained' in the East.

Beginning in 1943, the Reich Minister of the Economy introduced the job training program called Berufsausbildungsprogramm Ost for farming duty in the East (not to be confused with the ethnic cleansing of Generalplan Ost). He extended the existing laws of the Reich, concerning the protection of minors and of employment standards for the League of German Girls (Bund Deutscher Mädel) Osteinsatz, for whom such work was compulsory. Adolescent girls were employed in the Brandebourg Market for the agricultural work program. They were active in the resettlement areas of occupied Poland as their assignment. Yet, referring to the decree of January 1943, calling for the mobilization of German women aged 17 to 45, Gertrud Scholtz-Klink from NSDAP said in September of that year at a conference in Bad Schlachen:

The educated women in the women's league and made available to the Wehrmacht not only have to type and work, but also be soldiers of the Führer.

The Minister of Propaganda Joseph Goebbels in his Sportspalast speech delivered on February 18, 1943 at the Berlin Sports Hall, called on German women to work, and to be sober in their commitment:

1. "What use are beauty salons that encourage a cult of beauty and that takes up an enormous amount of our time and energy? They are wonderful during times of peace, but are a waste of time in a time of war. Our wives and our daughters will be able to welcome our victorious soldiers without their beautiful peacetime adornments."
2. "It is why we hire men that do not work in the war economy and women do not work at all. They cannot and will not ignore our request. The duties of women are huge. This is not to say that only those included in the law can work. All are welcome. The more who join the war effort, the more we free up soldiers for the front."
3. "For years, millions of German women have worked with brio in war production and they patiently wait to be joined and assisted by other women."
4. "Especially for you women, do you want the government to do everything in its power to encourage German women to put all their strength into supporting the war effort, and to let me leave for the front when possible, helping the men at the front?"
5. "The great upheavals and crises of national life show us who the real men and women are. We no longer have the right to speak of the weaker sex, since both sexes show the same determination and the same spiritual force."

The mobilisation of women in the war economy always remained limited: the number of women practising a professional activity in 1944 was virtually unchanged from 1939, being about 15 million women, in contrast to Great Britain, so that the use of women did not progress and only 1,200,000 of them worked in the arms industry in 1943, in working conditions that were difficult and often poorly treated by their bosses, who deplored their lack of qualification.

=== In the army (Wehrmacht) ===
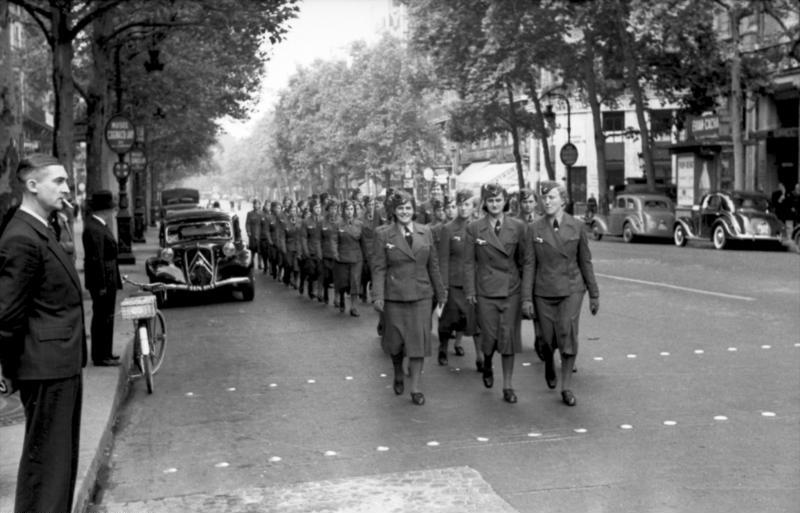
Women auxiliaries of the Wehrmacht in Paris during the occupation (1940)

In 1945, there numbered 500,000 women auxiliaries in the Wehrmacht (Wehrmachtshelferinnen), who were at the heart of the Heer, the Luftwaffe and the Kriegsmarine. About half of them were volunteers, the others performing obligatory service connected to the war effort (Kriegshilfsdienst). They took part, under the same authority as prisoners of war (Hiwis), as auxiliary personnel of the army (Behelfspersonal) and they were assigned to duties not only within the heart of the German Reich, but also within the German-occupied territories, for example in the General government of Poland, in France, in Spain and later in Yugoslavia, in Greece and in Romania.

They essentially participated:

- as telephone, telegraph and transmission operators,
- as administrative clerks typists and messengers,
- in anti-aircraft defense, as operators of listening equipment, operating projectors for anti-aircraft defense, employees within meteorology services, and auxiliary civil defense personnel
- in military health service, as volunteer nurses with the German Red Cross or other voluntary organizations

=== In the SS ===
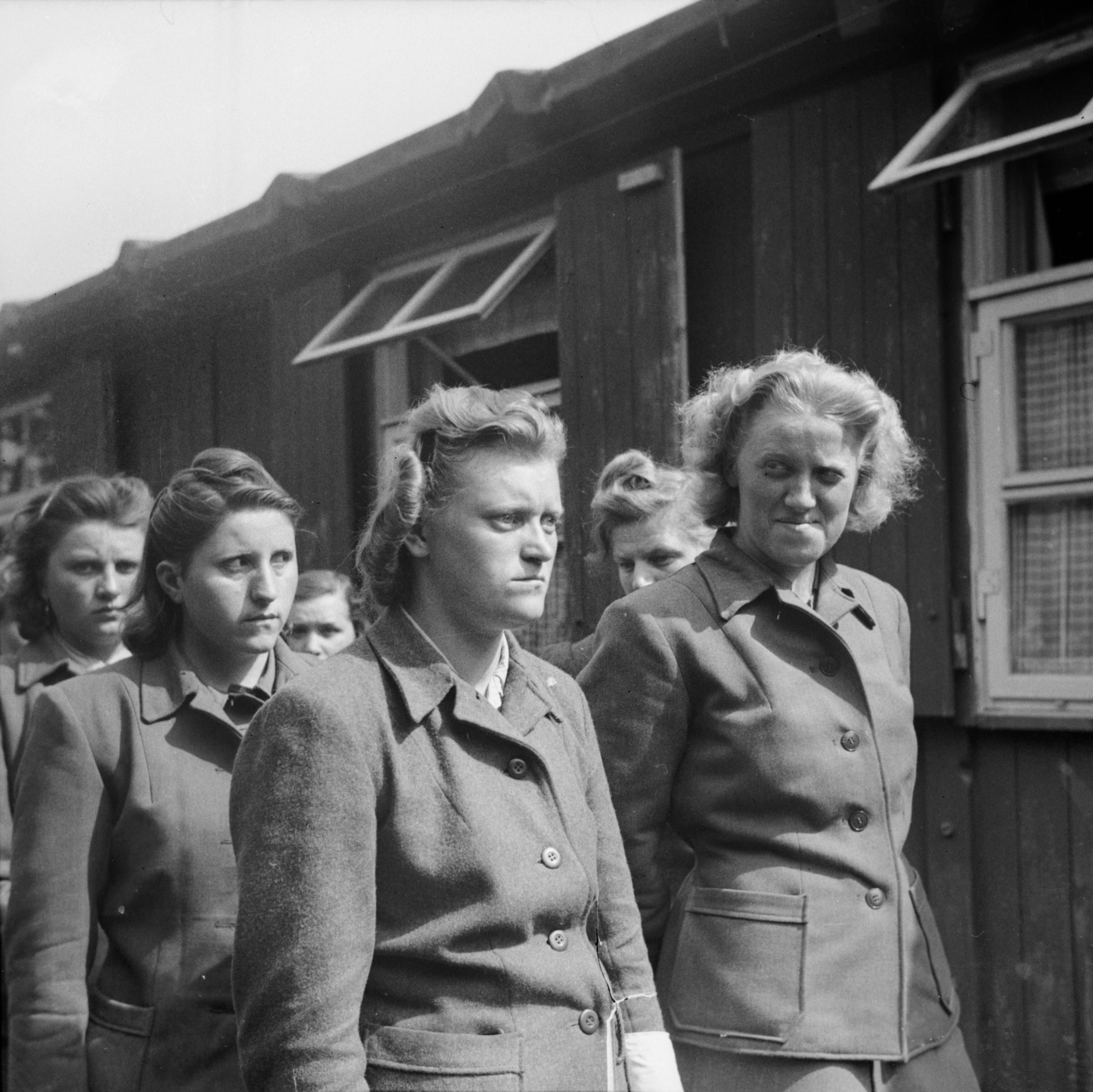
SS women camp guards in Bergen-Belsen concentration camp, 19 April 1945

The SS-Gefolge was the women's wing of the men's SS, but in contrast it was only confined to voluntary work in Emergency Service (Notdienstverpflichtung). SS Women belonged either to the SS-Helferinnen (de) or the SS-Kriegshelferinnen. They were in charge of auxiliary transmissions (telephone, radio operators, stenographers) in the SS and sometimes in camps (these were the Aufseherin, see next section). There was an internal hierarchy in the women's wing of the SS, which had no influence on the male troops, although the titles designated to the women sometimes had an influence upon the owners. However, whereas female camp guards were civilian employees of the SS, the SS-Helferinnen who completed training at the Reich-school in Obernai (Oberehnheim) were members of the Waffen-SS.

The SS-Helferinnen were trained at the Reichsschule-SS at Oberehnheim in Alsace. The Reichsschule-SS (in full, the Reichsschule für SS Helferinnen Oberenheim) was the training centre for the SS, reserved for women, and opened in Obernai in May 1942 upon the order of Heinrich Himmler. The SS-Helferinnenkorps has also been termed by historians as the 'SS-Frauenkorps'. 7,900 women were employed in the clerical unit of the SS, the SS Frauenkorps, and 10,000 as SS auxiliaries or Helferinnen. The training was more difficult than that for women enrolled in the German Army. They had to meet certain physical criteria determined by the regime: they must be aged 17 to 30 years and measure more than 1.65 m (5 ft 5 in) tall, while over the long term, the enrollment criteria were relaxed (the age limit was raised to 40 years and minimum height dropped to 1.58 metres); they even accepted 15 Muslim students. Having been in a privileged status, war widows were favoured before the admissions were opened up to other social classes. Women enrolled at the Reichsschule-SS came from various economic, class and educational backgrounds and included a member of the aristocracy in the ranks, Princess Ingeborg Alix. The Reichsschule-SS appealed to female Nazi ideologues who foresaw the possibility of social ascent by becoming an SS-Helferin, and candidates were often from families with other SS and NSDAP members. It has been noted by historians that "some SS-Helferinnen knew about the persecution of those whom the Nazis deemed to be worthless; Hermine S., who worked as an administrator at Auschwitz, stated that she knew the word Sonderbehandlung meant the gassing of prisoners." In her review of Jutta Muhlenberg's book, Das SS-Helferinnenkorps: Ausbildung, Einsatz und Entnazifizierung der weiblichen Angehörigen der Waffen-SS 1942–1949, Rachel Century writes:

Mühlenberg is very careful not to generalise and tar all the SS-Helferinnen with the same brush. Although all these women were a part of the bureaucratic staff, and were ‘Mittäterinnen, Zuschauerinnen und zum Teil – auch Zeuginnen von Gewalttätigkeiten’ [accomplices, spectators and sometimes even witnesses of violence] (p. 416), she notes that each woman still had individual responsibility over what she did, saw and knew, and it would be very difficult to identify the individual responsibilities of each SS-Helferin. Mühlenberg focuses on de-Nazification in the American sector, although the British zone is also discussed. A detailed report was drawn up by the Americans about the school, indicating how the women of the school should be dealt with; they were to be automatically detained... Mühlenberg concludes that the guilt of the former SS-Helferinnen lies in their voluntary participation in the bureaucratic apparatus of the SS.

— Rachel Century, review of Das SS-Helferinnenkorps: Ausbildung, Einsatz und Entnazifizierung der weiblichen Angehörigen der Waffen-SS 1942–1949, (Reviews in History, review no. 1183, December 2011).

The school closed in 1944 due to the advance of the Allies.

=== In the camps ===
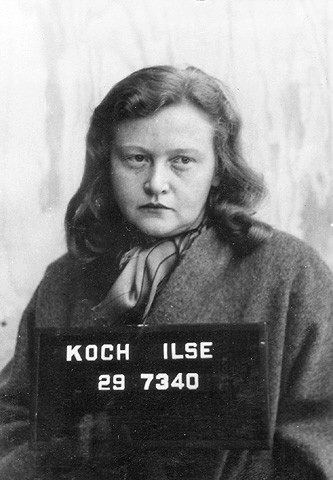
The Aufseherin of the Buchenwald concentration camp, Ilse Koch, after her arrest

Women were within the ranks of the Nazis at the Nazi concentration camps : these were the Aufseherinnen and generally belonged to the SS. They were guards, secretaries or nurses. They arrived before the start of the war, some of them being trained from 1938 in Lichtenburg. This took place due to the need for personnel following the growing number of political prisoners after the Kristallnacht on 8 and 9 November 1938. After 1939, they were trained at Camp Ravensbrück near Berlin. Coming mostly from lower- or middle-class social origins, they previously worked in traditional professions (hairdresser, teacher, for example) but were, in contrast to men who were required to fulfill military service, driven by a sincere desire to reach the female wing of the SS, the SS-Gefolge. Of the 50,000 total number of guards at all the Nazi camps, there were 5,000 women (approximately 10% of the workforce).

They worked at the Auschwitz and Majdanek camps beginning in 1942. The following year, the Nazis began the conscription of women because of the shortage of guards. Later, during the war, women were also assigned on a smaller scale in the camps Neuengamme Auschwitz (I, II and III), Plaszow Flossenbürg, Gross-Rosen Vught and Stutthof and in the death camps of Bełżec, Sobibór Treblinka and Chełmno. Seven Aufseherinnen served at Vught, 24 were at Buchenwald, 34 at Bergen-Belsen, 19 at Dachau, 20 at Mauthausen, three at Mittelbau-Dora, seven at Natzweiler-Struthof, twenty at Majdanek, 200 at Auschwitz and its sub-camps, 140 at Sachsenhausen, 158 at Neuengamme, 47 at Stutthof, compared with 958 who served at Ravensbrück, 561 at Flossenbürg and 541 at Gross-Rosen. Many supervisors worked in the sub-camps in Germany and some in Poland, France, Austria, and Czechoslovakia.

There was a hierarchy within the Aufseherin position, including the following higher ranks: the Rapportaufseherin (head Aufseherin), the Erstaufseherin (first guard), the Lagerführerin (head of the camp), and finally, the Oberaufseherin (senior inspector), a post only occupied by Anna Klein and Luise Brunner.

== Female members of minorities ==
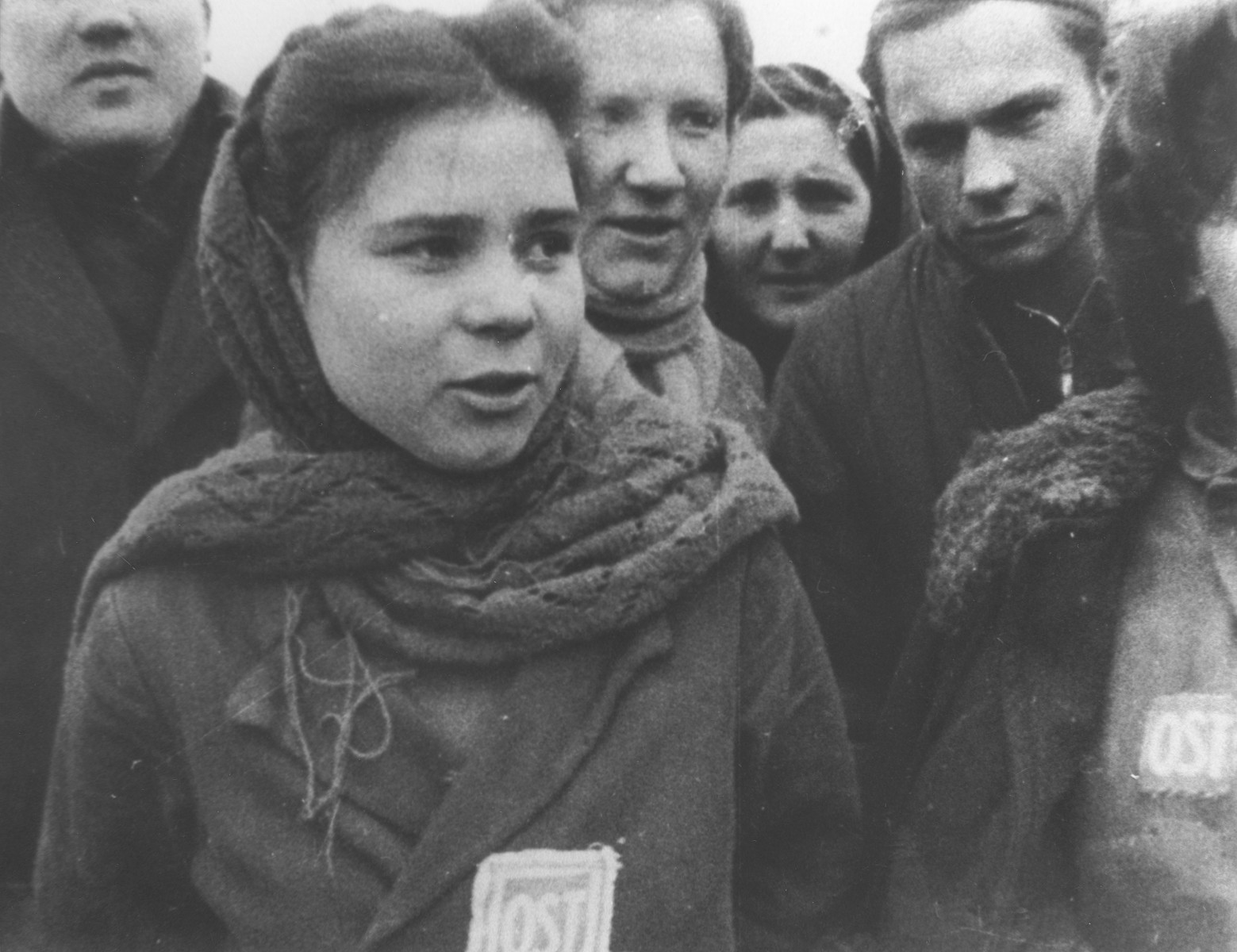
Female slave worker wearing an Ostarbeiter badge at the former SS Osti Arbeitslager camp in occupied Poland, January 1945

Under the same threats as men who were Jews or Romani, women belonging to these communities were equally discriminated against, then deported and for some exterminated. In many concentration camps there were sections for female detainees (notably at Auschwitz and Bergen-Belsen) but the camp at Ravensbrück, opened in May 1939, distinguished itself as a camp solely for women, by 1945 numbering about 100,000 prisoners. The first women's concentration camp had been opened in 1933 in Moringen, before being transferred to Lichtenburg in 1938.

In concentration camps, women were considered weaker than men, and they were generally sent to the gas chambers more quickly, whereas the strength of men was used to work the men to exhaustion. Some women were subjected to medical experiments.

Some took the path of the Resistance, such as the Polish member Haika Grossman, who participated in the organization for aid for the ghetto of Białystok, during the night of August 15 to 16, 1943. On October 7, 1944, members of the Sonderkommando in the Auschwitz Birkenau camp, 250 prisoners responsible for the bodies of persons after gassing, rose up; they had procured explosives stolen by a Kommando of young Jewish women (Ala Gertner, Regina Safir, Estera Wajsblum and Roza Robota) who worked in the armament factories of the Union Werke. They succeeded in partially destroying Crematorium IV.

== Female resistance to Nazism ==
In addition to the resistors forced into their commitment because of their risk of being deported and exterminated because of their race, some were also committed against the German Nazi regime. Women represented approximately 15% of the Resistance. Monique Moser-Verrey notes however:

If we can say that, among the persecuted minorities, women are more often spared than men, it is their low status in a society dominated by men that did not make them sizeable enemies of the regime, however, it is they who understood the need to hide or flee before their misled spouses, whose social inclusion was more complete.

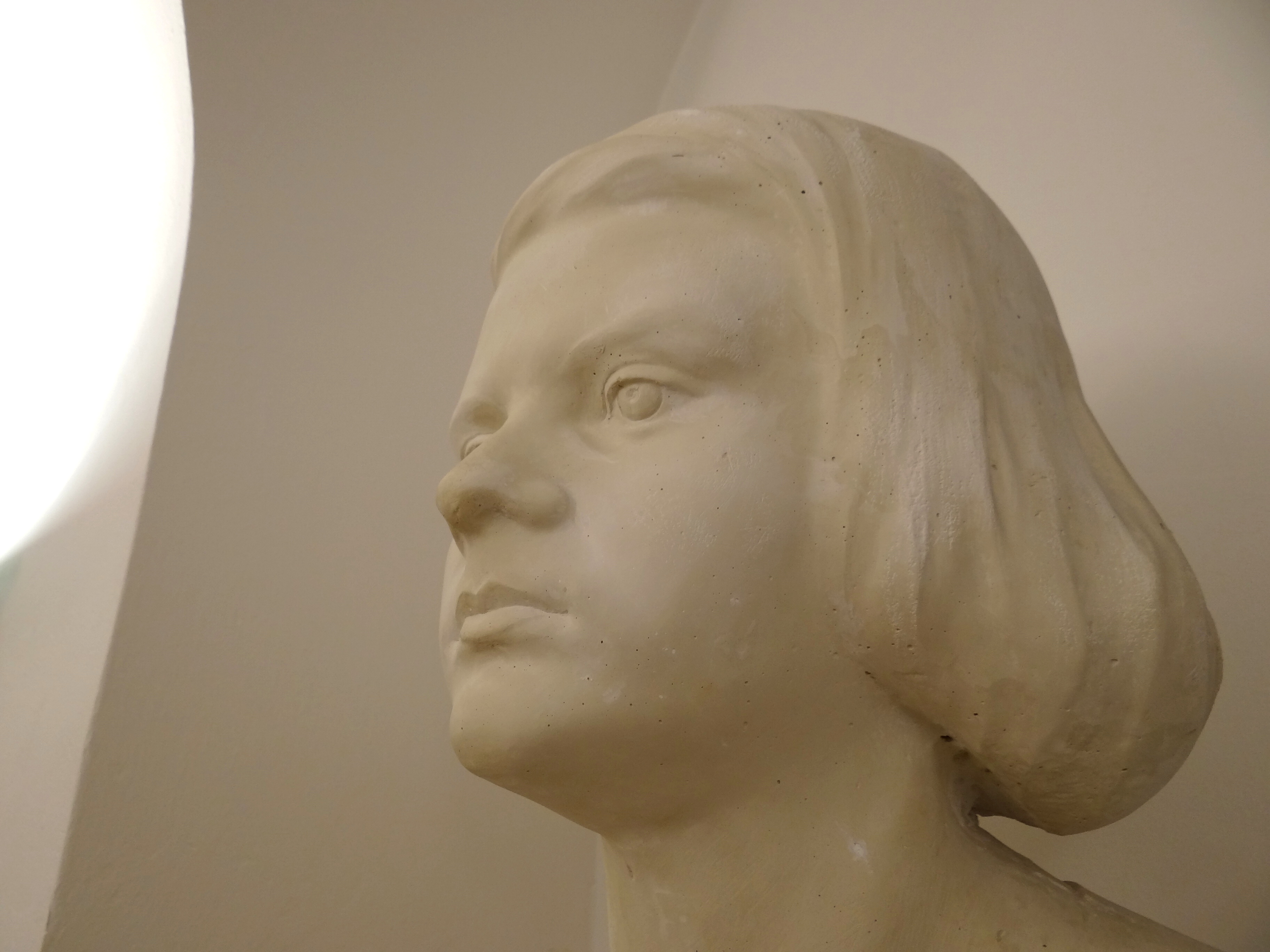
Bust of Sophie Scholl in Munich

The student Communist Liselotte Herrmann protested in 1933 against the appointment of Adolf Hitler as chancellor and managed to get information to foreign governments about the rearmament of Germany. In 1935 she was arrested, sentenced to death two years later and executed in 1938. She was the first German mother to suffer the death penalty since the beginning of the regime. Twenty women from Düsseldorf, who saw their fathers, brothers and son deported to the camp Börgermoor, managed to smuggle out the famous The Song of the deportees and make it known. Freya von Moltke, Mildred Harnack-Fish and Libertas Schulze-Boysen participated in the Resistance group Kreisau Circle and Red Orchestra; the last two were arrested and executed. The 20-year-old student Sophie Scholl, a member of The White Rose was executed February 22, 1943 with her brother Hans Scholl and Christoph Probst, for posting leaflets. The resistor Maria Terwiel helped to spread knowledge of the famous sermons condemning the Nazi movement given by Clemens von Galen, Bishop of Munster, as well as helping Jews escape to abroad. She was executed on 5 August 1943. The successful protests of women can also be noted, called the Rosenstraße, racially "Aryan" women married to Jews who, in February 1943, obtained the release of their husbands.

Women also fought for the Resistance from abroad, like Dora Schaul, a Communist who had left Germany in 1934 and involved from July 1942 with clandestine networks, Deutsch Arbeit (German Labour) and Deutsche-Feldpost (My German countryside), from the School of Military Health in Lyon. Hilde Meisel attempted in 1933 to galvanize British public opinion against the Nazi regime. She returned to Germany during the war but was executed at the bend of a road.

Slightly more than half of the Righteous Among the Nations recognized by Yad Vashem are women. While many of them acted in cooperation with family members, some initiated rescue efforts and acted independently to save Jews.

== High society and circles of power ==
Although women did not have political power in Nazi Germany, a circle of influence did exist around Adolf Hitler. Within this circle, Hitler became acquainted with the British Unity Mitford and Magda Goebbels, wife of the Minister of Propaganda Joseph Goebbels. Magda Goebbels became known by the nickname "First Lady of the Third Reich": she represented the regime during State visits and official events. Her marriage to Goebbels on December 19, 1931, was considered a society event, where Leni Riefenstahl was a notable guest. She posed as the model German mother for Mothers Day. Eleonore Baur, a nurse and acquaintance of Hitler since 1920 (she had participated in the Beer Hall putsch) was one of the few women to receive the Blood Order; she also participated in official receptions and was close to Heinrich Himmler, who gave her the privileges of an Oberführer of the SS and permitted her free access to the concentration camps, which she went to regularly, particularly Dachau. Hitler did not forget that he owed part of his political ascension to women integrated in the society world (aristocrats or industrialists), such as Elsa Bruckmann.

Women were also able to distinguish themselves in certain domains, but they were exceptions. Thus Leni Riefenstahl was the official film director of the regime and was given enormous funding for her cinematic productions (Triumph of the Will, and Olympia). Winifred Wagner directed the highly publicized Bayreuth Festival, and soprano Elisabeth Schwarzkopf was promoted as the "Nazi diva", as noted by an American newspaper. Hanna Reitsch, an aviator, distinguished herself with her handling of test aircraft and military projects of the regime, notably the V1 flying bomb.

=== Prominent women of Nazi Germany ===
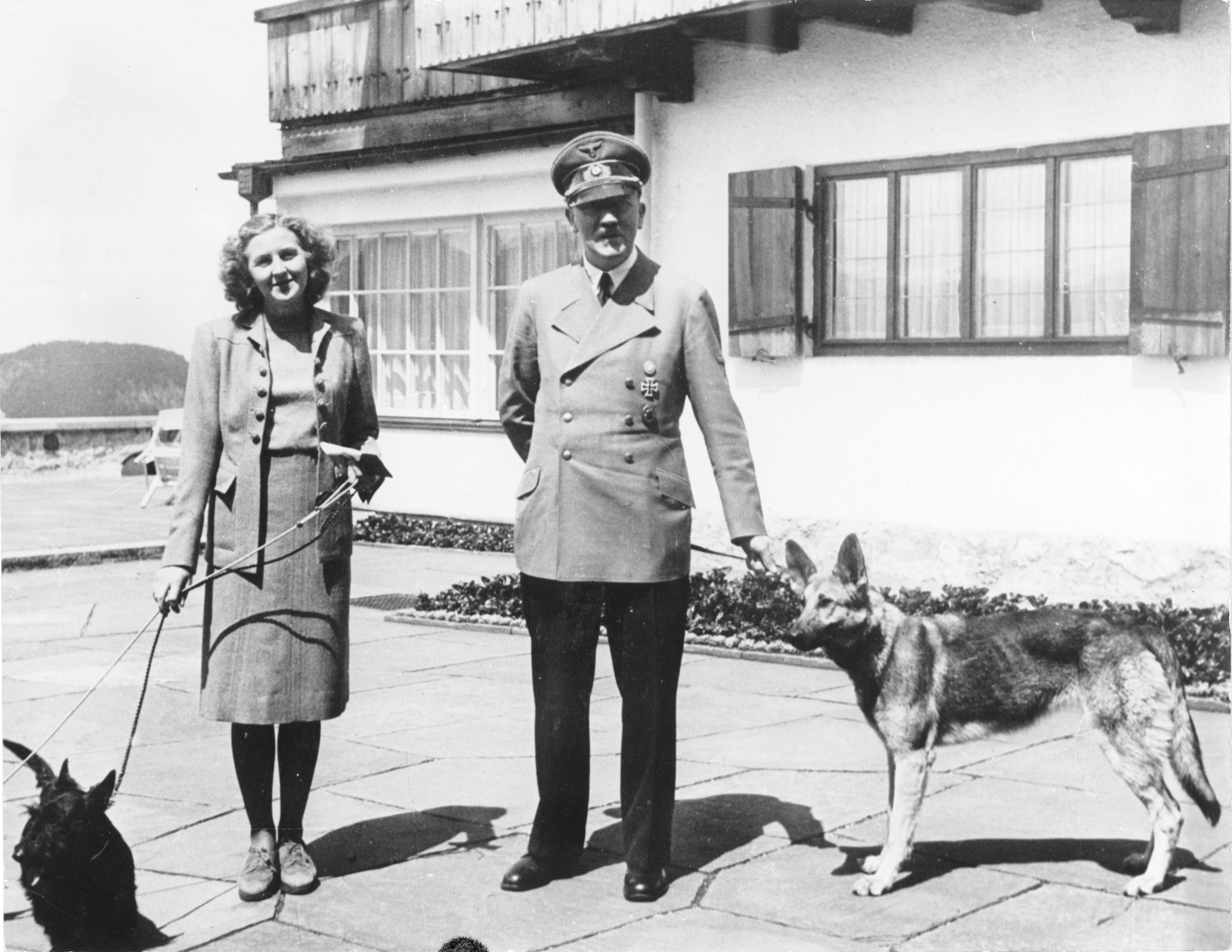
Eva Braun, companion and then wife of Adolf Hitler

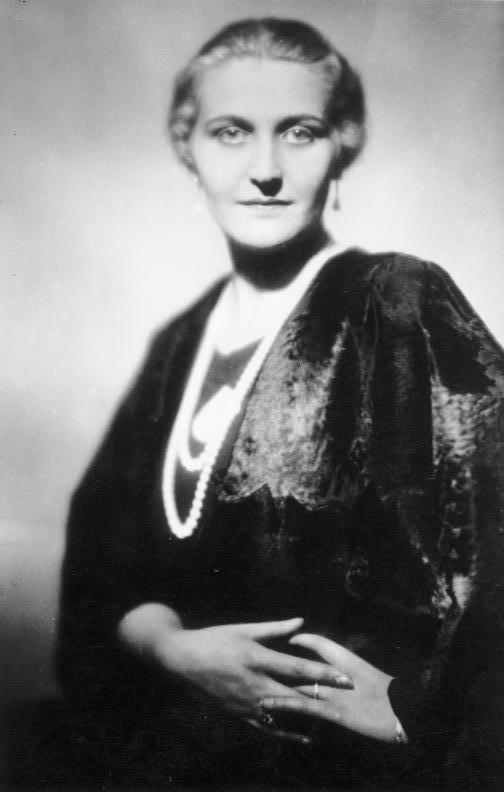
Magda Goebbels, wife of Minister of Propaganda Joseph Goebbels and known as the "First Lady of the Third Reich"

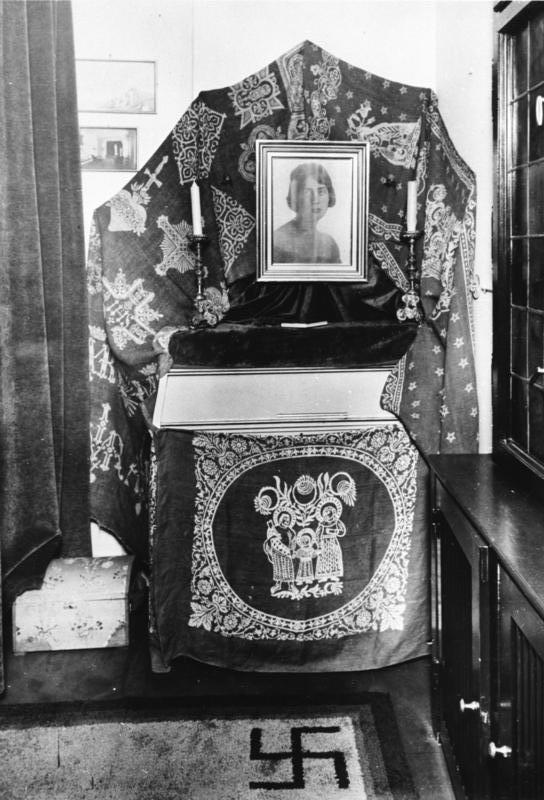
Funeral altar of Carin Göring, first wife of Air Force Commander-in-Chief Hermann Göring

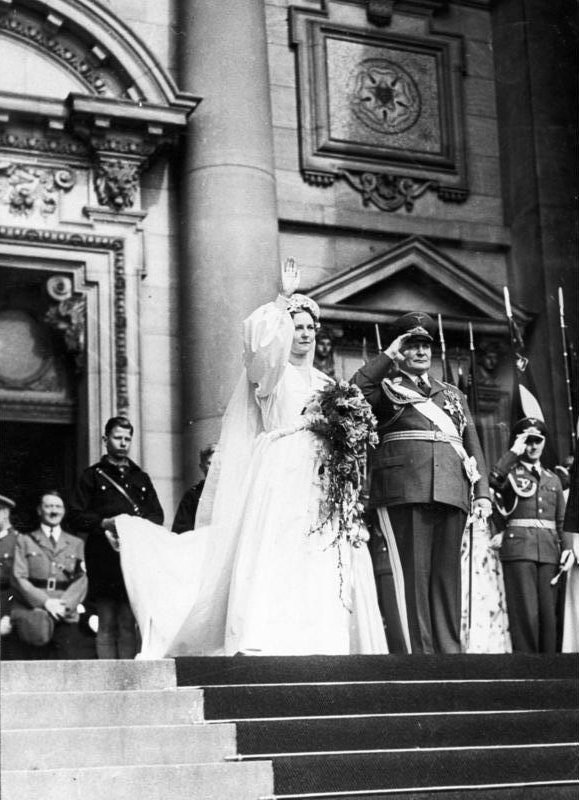
Actress Emmy Göring, second wife of Air Force Commander-in-Chief Hermann Göring

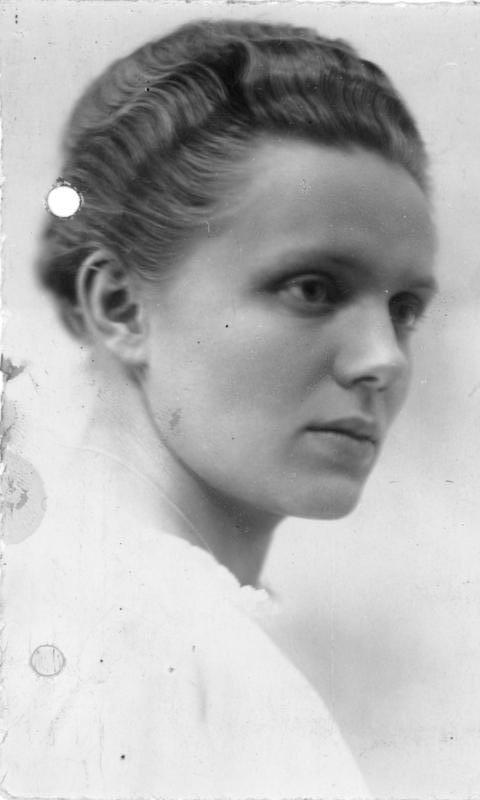
Margarete Himmler, wife of Reichsführer-SS then Minister of the Interior Heinrich Himmler

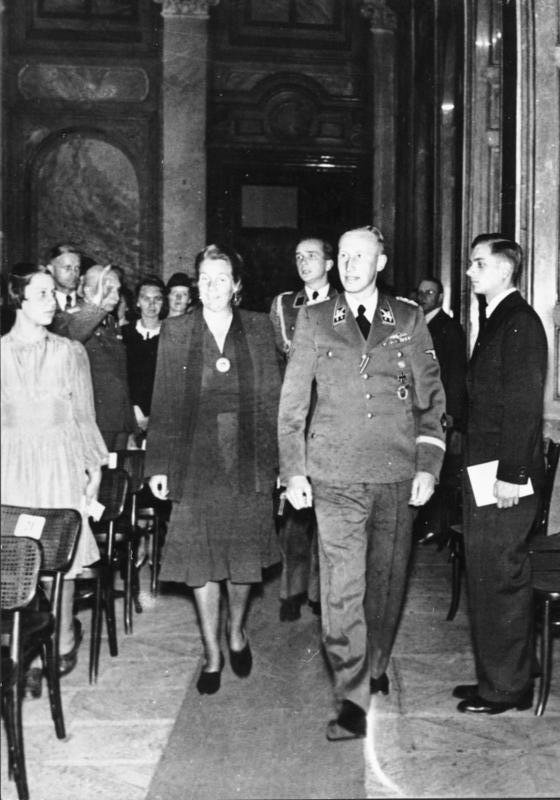
Lina Heydrich, wife of Deputy Protector of Bohemia-Moravia Reinhard Heydrich

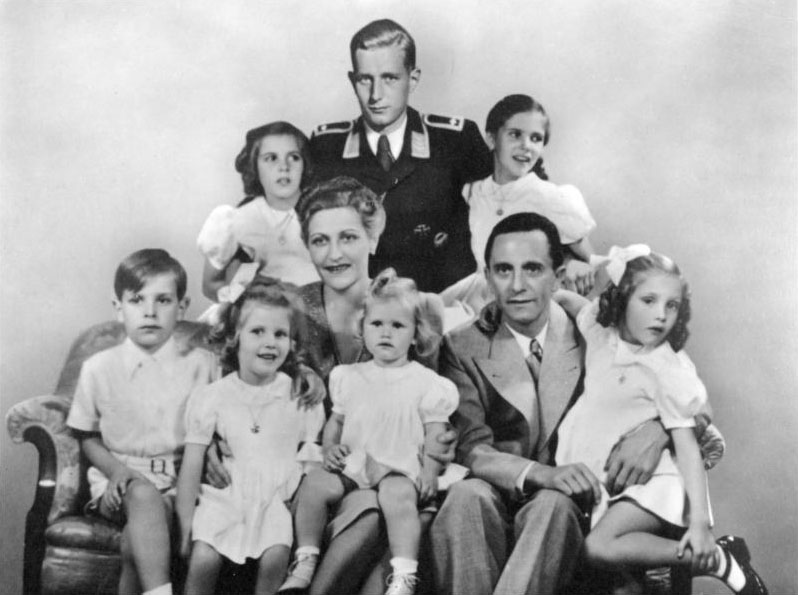
The Goebbels children with Joseph and Magda Goebbels: Helga, Hildegard, Heldwig, Holdine and Heidrun.

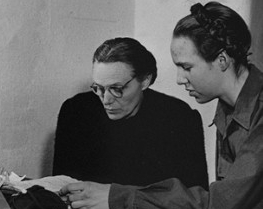
The daughter of Heinrich Himmler, Gudrun Himmler (right), with her mother Margarete Himmler

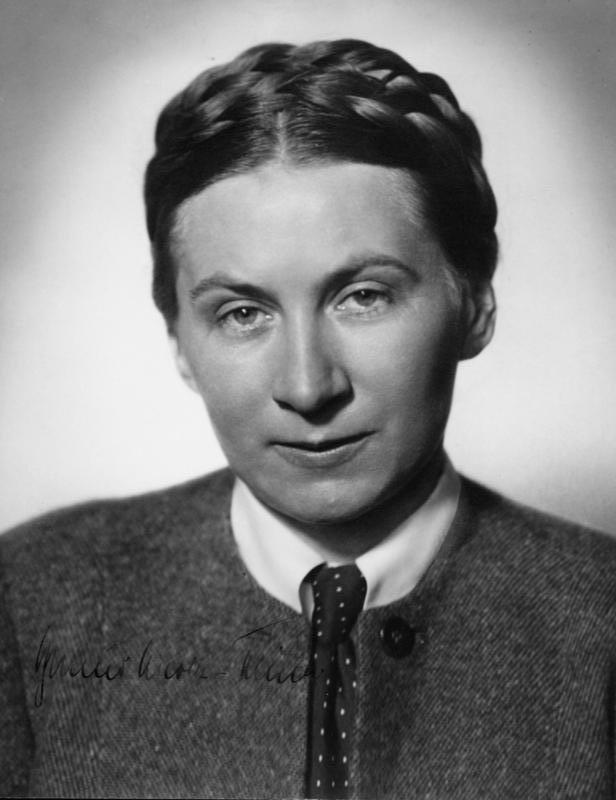
Gertrud Scholtz-Klink, president of the NS-Frauenschaft

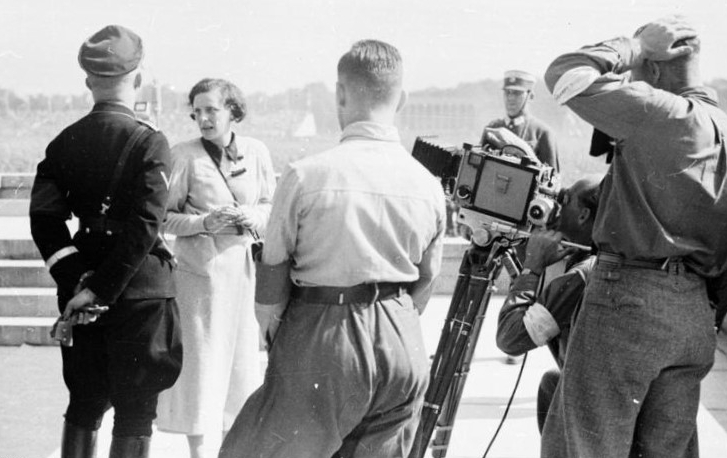
Filmmaker Leni Riefenstahl with Heinrich Himmler

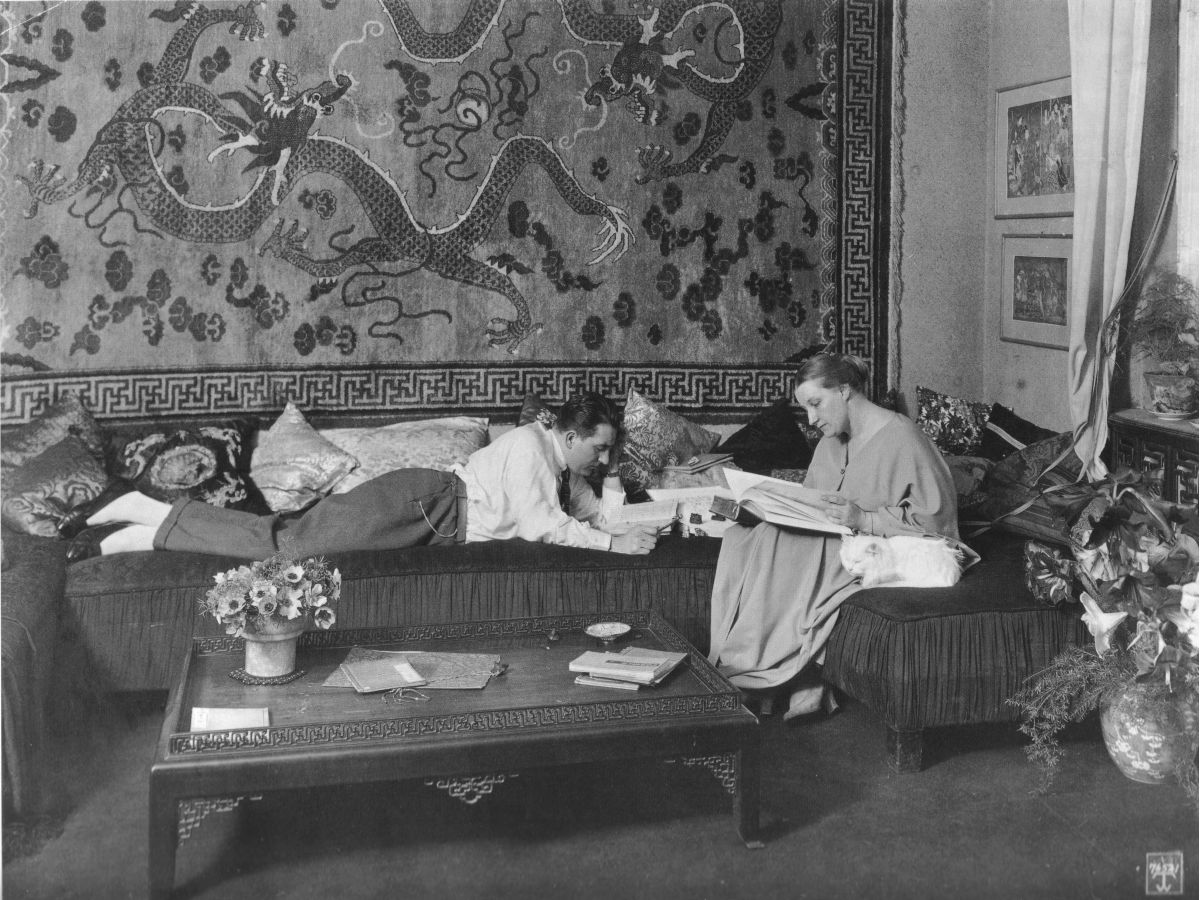
Screenwriter Thea von Harbou

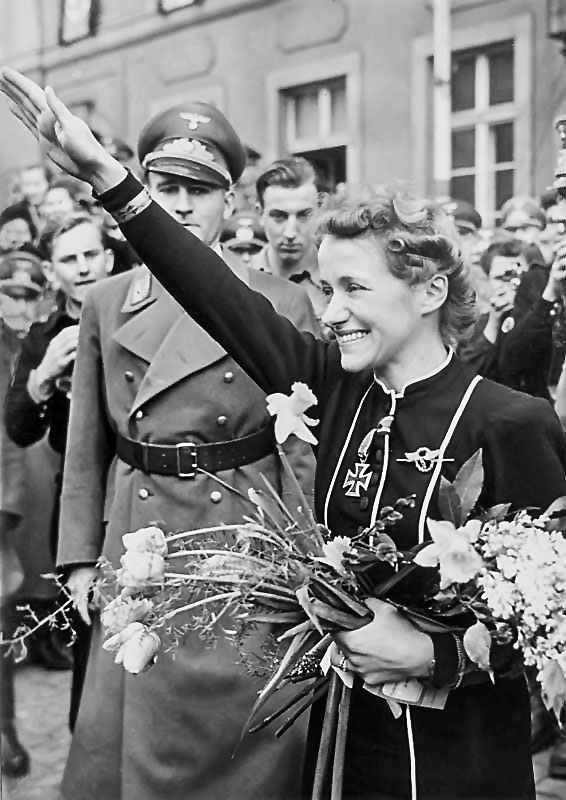
Aviator Hanna Reitsch

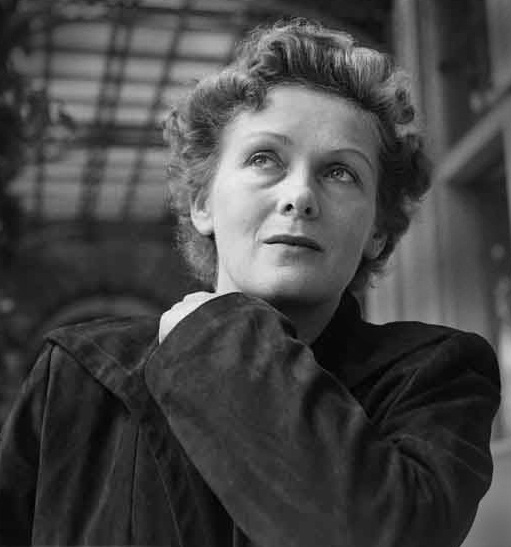
Opera singer Elisabeth Schwarzkopf

== Women during the collapse of Nazi Germany ==
Prussian Nights

The little daughter's on the mattress,
Dead. How many have been on her
A platoon, a company perhaps?
A girl's been turned into a woman,
A woman turned into a corpse.
It's all come down to simple phrases:
Do not forget! Do not forgive!
Blood for blood! A tooth for a tooth!

— Alexander Solzhenitsyn

After the collapse of Nazi Germany, many German women nicknamed Trümmerfrauen ("Rubble Women") participated in the rebuilding of Germany by clearing up the ruins resulting from the war. In the Soviet occupation zone, more than two million women were victims of rape. One of them would publish a memoir recalling this experience: Eine Frau in Berlin ("A Woman In Berlin"). As the Soviets entered German territory, German women typically had no choice, save suicide, to comply. Age did not matter with victimization crossing the generational strata entirely. Famed Russian author Alexander Solzhenitsyn, outraged by finding the body of a small girl murdered following a gang rape, wrote a scathing poem to mark the moment for posterity (right).

What Solzhenitsyn's poem also reveals is the penchant for revenge the Red Army exacted upon Germany, a recompense promulgated by Soviet leaders. Soviet troops were given a certain degree of license in the early victories in repulsing the Germans, as even Josef Stalin expressed outright indifference towards rape. An example is discernible in what Stalin once asked Yugoslav's communist leader Milovan Djilas, "Can't he understand it if a soldier who has crossed thousands of kilometers through blood and fire and death has fun with a woman or takes some trifle?" Many German women died in the midst of such trifles, their husbands and families suffering immeasurable grief along with them, and some of them chose to take their own lives in lieu of being raped. Even when not raped, women hid in apartments, cellars, and closets for fear of being violated, experiencing hunger, fear, and loneliness which left psychological scars for years to come.

=== Accountability for committed war crimes ===
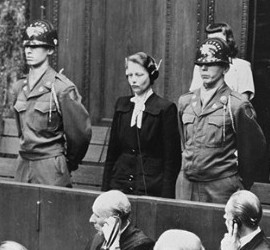
Herta Oberheuser at the trial for doctors, August 20, 1947

The question of the culpability of the German people in their support of Nazism has long overshadowed the women, who had little political power under the regime. Thus, as explained by the German historian Gisela Bock, who was involved with the first historians to highlight this issue, by asking women during the Nazi era. In 1984, in "When Biology Became Destiny, Women in Weimar and Nazi Germany", she wrote that women who are enslaved economically and morally, cannot exercise their freedom by being confined in the home and placed under the rule of their husbands. Thus, we associate studies on the subject during the 1980s mainly with perceptions that women were victims of "machismo" and a "misogynist" fascism. In terms of voting patterns, a higher proportion of male voters supported the Nazi party compared to female voters.

However, the simplicity of this analysis tends to disappear with recent studies. In 1987, historian Claudia Koonz, in "Mothers in Fatherland, Women, the Family and Nazi Politics" questioned this statement and acknowledged some guilt. She states as follows: "Far from being impressionable or innocent, women made possible State murder in the name of interests that they defined as maternal." For her, the containing of housewives just allowed them to assert themselves and grasp an identity, especially through women's associations led by Nazi Gertrud Scholtz-Klink. They therefore helped to stabilize the system. The women took pleasure in politics and eugenics of the state, which promised financial assistance if the birth rate was high, so they would help to stabilize the system "by preserving the illusion of love in an environment of hate." In addition, if Gisela Bock denounced the work of her colleague as "anti-feminist", others as Adelheid von Saldern refuse to stop at a strict choice between complicity and oppression and are more interested in how Nazism included women in their project for Germany.

Kate Docking, in her book review of Female Administrators of the Third Reich writes that, "The key merit of this monograph is that it makes visible the women who ultimately allowed the Holocaust to occur: as the author notes, while these women did not execute orders for the persecution of Jews themselves, the genocide could not have been accomplished without those who typed the orders, answered the telephones, and sent the telegrams. Female administrators had the opportunity to question their orders and find out more about the Holocaust, but generally, they did not. They had some awareness of the Holocaust, and did nothing. Many recalled their time working for the Third Reich with fondness and nostalgia." Recent work from historian Wendy Lower (consultant to the United States Holocaust Memorial Museum), demonstrates that a substantial number of women were accomplices to Nazi atrocities, and sometimes direct participants. Lower writes:

The entire population of German women (almost forty million in 1939) cannot be considered a victim group. One-third of the female population, thirteen million women, were actively engaged in a Nazi Party organisation, and female membership in the Nazi Party increased steadily until the end of the war. Just as the agency of women in history more generally is under-appreciated, here too – and perhaps even more problematically, given the legal and moral implications –the agency of women in the crimes of the Third Reich has not been fully elaborated and explained. Vast numbers of ordinary German women were not victims, and routine forms of female participation in the Holocaust have not yet been disclosed.

Such realities make it abundantly clear that by the time the war ended, German women had traversed the full-circle of being once sheltered incubators for the Aryan future to effectual contributors in the Nazi concentration camp system.

=== Neo-Nazism ===
There are many militant neo-Nazis or defenders of former Nazis, such as the Germans Helene Elisabeth von Isenburg or Gudrun Himmler (daughter of Heinrich Himmler), who are active through the organization Stille Hilfe, and the French citizens Françoise Dior and Savitri Devi.

== See also ==
- History of German women
- Nazi Germany
- Women's history
- Rape during the occupation of Germany

== General references ==
- Century, Rachel. "Dictating the Holocaust: Female administrators of the Third Reich" (PhD Dissertation, University of London, 2012) online. Bibliography pp 277–310
- Century, Rachel. Female Administrators of the Third Reich. London: Palgrave, 2017.
- Krimmer, Elisabeth. Review of Das SS-Helferinnenkorps: Ausbildung, Einsatz und Entnazifizierung der weiblichen Angehörigen der Waffen-SS 1942–1949, by Jutta Mühlenberg. Holocaust and Genocide Studies, vol. 30 no. 1, 2016, pp. 144–146.
- Lower, Wendy. Hitler's Furies: German Women in the Nazi Killing Fields. Boston: Houghton Mifflin Harcourt, 2013.
- MacDonogh, Giles. After the Reich: The Brutal History of the Allied Occupation. (2007).
- Moser-Verrey, Monique (1991). "Les femmes du troisième Reich". Recherches féministes. 4 (2): 25–44. doi:10.7202/057649ar. PDF via Érudit web portal (www.erudit.org).
- Mühlenberg, Jutta. Das SS-Helferinnenkorps: Ausbildung, Einsatz und Entnazifizierung der weiblichen Angehörigen der Waffen-SS 1942–1949. Hamburg: Hamburger Edition, 2011.
- Payne, Stanley G. (1995). A History of Fascism 1914–1945. Madison: University of Wisconsin Press. ISBN 978-0-58-525197-4.
- Rempel, Gerhard. Hitler's Children. Chapel Hill and London: University of North Carolina Press, 1989.
- Sigmund, Anna Maria. Women of the Third Reich. (2000).
- Stephenson, Jill. Women in Nazi Germany (2001).
