= Claudia Koonz =

American historian of Nazi Germany

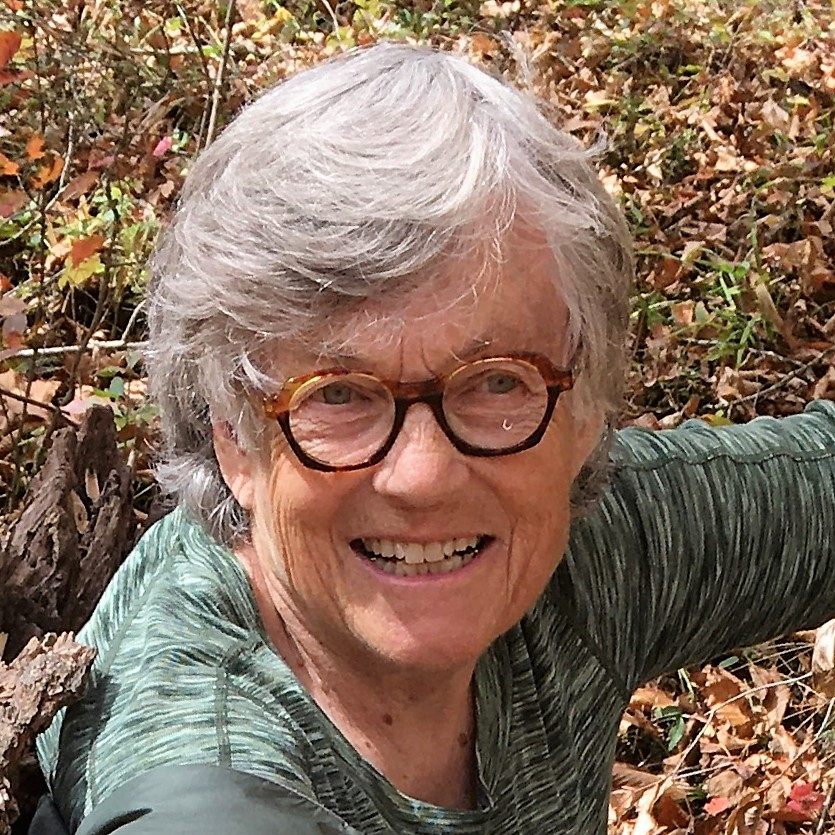

Academic background
- Education: University of Wisconsin–Madison; Columbia University; Rutgers University

Academic work
- Discipline: History
- Institutions: Duke University

Claudia Ann Koonz is an American historian of Nazi Germany. Koonz's critique of the role of women during the Nazi era, from a feminist perspective, has become a subject of much debate and research in itself. She is a recipient of the PEN New England Award, and a National Book Award finalist. Koonz has appeared on the podcasts Holocaust, hosted by University of California Television, and Real Dictators, hosted by Paul McGann. In the months before the 2020 United States presidential election, Koonz wrote about the risks of autocracy in the United States for History News Network and the New School's Public Seminar.

== Education ==
Koonz received a BA in 1962 from the University of Wisconsin, Madison that included two semesters studying at LMU Munich. After a year of traveling overland through Asia, she studied at Columbia University, from which she earned an MA in 1964, before earning a PhD from Rutgers University in 1969.

== Scholarship ==
Claudia Koonz is Peabody Family Professor emerita in the History Department at Duke University. Before coming to Duke in 1988, she taught at College of the Holy Cross in Worcester, Massachusetts, and at Long Island University, Southampton from 1969 to 1971.

Together with Renate Bridenthal, she edited the first anthology of European women’s history, Becoming Visible. She subsequently published two books, Mothers in the Fatherland: Women, the Family and Nazi Politics and The Nazi Conscience, which analyze the sources of ordinary Germans' support for the Nazi Party during Weimar and Nazi Germany. The Nazi Conscience has been translated into Spanish, Japanese, and Russian. Her current book on stereotypes in French media (forthcoming with Duke University Press) is Between Foreign and French: Prominent French Women from Muslim Backgrounds in the Media Spotlight, 1989-2020.

=== Mothers in the Fatherland ===
Koonz is best known for documenting the appeal of Nazism to German women and understanding their enthusiasm for the Nazis. Koonz has established that the leaders of German feminist, civic, and religious groups acquiesced to Nazification (Gleichschaltung) that coerced Germans into following Nazi policy. Women in Marxist movements joined with men in operating underground opposition networks. Koonz has noted that female supporters of the Nazis accepted the Nazi division of the sexes into a public sphere for men and a private sphere for women. A reviewer in the New York Times wrote that Mothers in the Fatherland explored the “paradox that the very women who were so protective of their children, so warm, nurturing and giving to their families, could at the same time display extraordinary cruelty.” Koonz has claimed that women involved in resistance activities were more likely to escape notice owing to the "masculine" values of the Third Reich. A mother, for example, could smuggle illegal leaflets through a checkpoint in a pram without arousing suspicion.

Koonz is also known for her claim that two kinds of women asserted themselves in the Third Reich: those, like Gertrud Scholtz-Klink, who gained power over women under their supervision in exchange for subservience to the men who wielded power over them (the authoritarian trade-off) and the women who violated the norms of civilized society, such as camp guards like Ilse Koch. Koonz includes women who were opposed to Nazism 100% as well as "single issue" critics (of, for example, sterilization and euthanasia) but did not protect or protest the deportation of Jews to death camps. Koonz's views have often been pitted against those of Gisela Bock in a battle some have referred to as the Historikerinnenstreit (quarrel among historians of women).

Mothers in the Fatherland integrates archival research into an exploration of “the nature of feminist commitment, complicity in the Holocaust, and the meaning of Germany’s past.” The Nazis promised “emancipation from emancipation,” an appeal that resonated with Germans who feared that male-female equality meant “social and family disintegration.” But Koonz highlights the paradoxes produced by the Third Reich’s dependence on women’s participation (as subordinates, to be sure) in child-bearing, social work, education, surveillance, health care, and compliance with race policy. A reviewer in the New York Times wrote that Koonz dug “deeply and discerningly into a variety of documents, ... to record the mixed results of Nazi efforts at mobilizing women’s groups, secular, Protestant and Catholic” and Jewish women’s efforts to fight against confiscation, ostracism, deportation and murder.

Catherine Stimpson called the contradictory message of Mothers of the Fatherland “painful” because:

“If many societies deprive women of power over themselves, women still have power to exercise. Women, though Other to men, have their Others too. In the United States white women did own black slaves of both sexes, and in Nazi Germany, as Claudia Koonz showed us in her heartbreaking book, Mothers in the Fatherland, Nazi women did brutalize and kill Jews of both sexes. And colonizers both lorded and ladied it over the colonized of both sexes.”

=== The Nazi Conscience ===
Conventional scholarship defines Nazism by its antisemitism, anti-modernism, and anti-liberalism, as expressed in publications like Der Stürmer, but The Nazi Conscience examines the "positive" values of community and ethnic purity that attracted ordinary Germans, including millions who had never voted Nazi before Adolf Hitler's takeover.

A reviewer wrote that Koonz's book challenges us to "suspend temporarily our understanding of Nazism and to try to understand the movement as the Nazis themselves understood it. In doing so, we can better understand how murderous racist doctrines infiltrated the moral and psychological fabric of the German people so easily."

A reviewer for The Review of Politics called The Nazi Conscience a "meticulously researched and engrossingly written book". Another reviewer called it a "tour de force" that documents the formation of a consensus that evolved during the "normal" years of the Third Reich, 1933–1941. This was a time when National Socialist racial policy congealed, or according to Koonz, "metastasized" in three contexts: Hitler's public persona, academic think tanks, and bureaucratic networks.

During these years, the rabidly antisemitic Nazi base was held in check by Hitler himself and the proponents of a "rational" assault against Jews. Although ordinary Germans deplored violence, antisemitic measures that appeared "legal" were scarcely noticed. After all, fewer than one percent of all Germans were Jewish, and by 1939 half of them had emigrated. Besides, Hitler's government ended unemployment, scored diplomatic victories, and revived national pride. Most citizens "accepted a new Nazi-specific morality that was steeped in the language of ethnic superiority, love of fatherland, and community values," according to another review of The Nazi Conscience.

Koonz cautioned that nostalgia for imagined glory is a potent force that could rally aggrieved citizens to ethnic nationalism elsewhere. "In examining how National Socialism mobilized diverse but quotidian institutional contexts to create a 'community of moral obligation,' she invites us to reflect on ... the ways contemporary society demonizes, ostracizes, and excludes certain classes of people." Corey Robin noted Koonz "might have cited Thomas Jefferson who, anticipating the Nazis by more than a century, saw no future for freed blacks other than deportation or extermination."

== Recent work ==
Prior to the 2020 United States presidential election, Koonz published articles in History News Network and the New School's Public Seminar warning about the risks of autocracy in the United States. Following the election of Joe Biden in 2020, Koonz's work analyzed the presidency of Donald Trump through the lens of World War II history, and analyzed the withdrawal of United States troops from Afghanistan in 2021 through a historical lens.

== Awards and honors ==
- 1987 National Book Award non-fiction finalist
- 1987 New York Times Notable Book of 1987
- 1987 Outstanding Book in Women's History at the Berkshire Conference of Women Historians
- 1987 PEN-Boston Globe Winship Book of the Year Award
- 1990 Libération (Paris) best 100 books of 1990
- 1990-1991 Raoul Wallenberg Visiting Professorship, Rutgers University, Rutgers Institute for History
- 1993-1994 National Humanities Center Fellowship
- 1993-1994 American Council of Learned Societies Fellowship
- 2005-2006 John Simon Guggenheim Foundation
- 2006 American Academy in Berlin Haniel Fellow
- 2007 Duke University Distinguished Teaching Award

== Work ==
- co-edited with Renate Bridenthal Becoming Visible: Women in European History, 1977, revised edition 1987.
- Mothers in the Fatherland: Women, the Family, and Nazi Politics, 1986
- The Nazi Conscience Cambridge, Massachusetts: The Belknap Press of Harvard University Press, 2003, ISBN 978-0-674-01172-4.
