= Gertrud Scholtz-Klink =

German Nazi official (1902–1999)

Reichsfrauenführerin Gertrud Scholtz-Klink
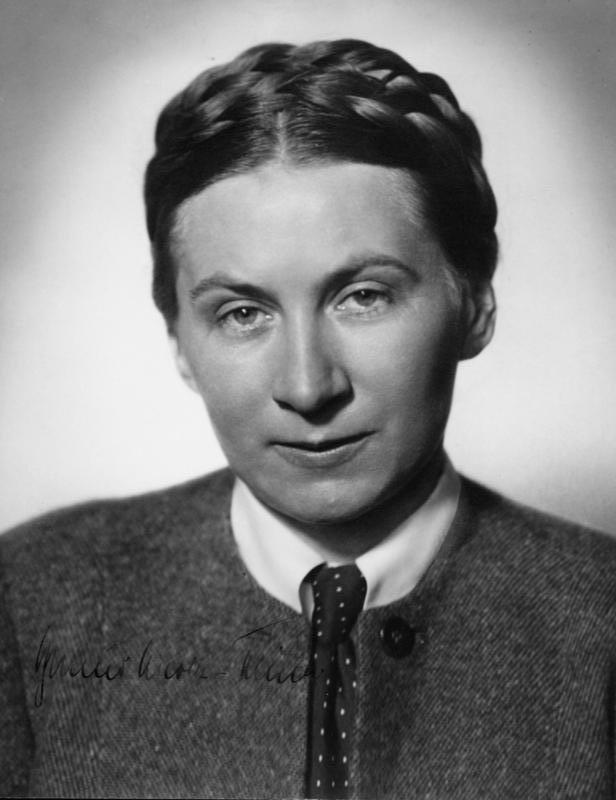
- Scholtz-Klink, 1934

Reichsführerin National Socialist Women's League
- In office 24 February 1934 – 8 May 1945
- Appointed by: Adolf Hitler
- Preceded by: Position established
- Succeeded by: Position abolished

Reichsführerin Deutsches Frauenwerk
- In office 24 February 1934 – 8 May 1945
- Appointed by: Adolf Hitler
- Preceded by: Position established
- Succeeded by: Position abolished

Leader German Women's Labor Service
- In office 1 January 1934 – 1 April 1936
- Appointed by: Konstantin Hierl
- Preceded by: Position established
- Succeeded by: Position abolished

Additional positions
- 1934–1945: Leader, Women's League; German Red Cross
- 1934–1945: Leader, Women's Bureau; German Labor Front
- 1937–1945: Academy for German Law

Personal details
- Born: Gertrud Emma Treusch; 9 February 1902 Adelsheim, Grand Duchy of Baden, German Empire
- Died: 24 March 1999 (aged 97) Bebenhausen-Tübingen, Baden-Württemberg, Germany
- Party: Nazi Party (1930-1945)
- Spouse(s): Eugen Klink (m. 1921–1930); Günther Scholtz (m. 1932–1937); August Heissmeyer (m. 1940–1979)
- Children: 6, including Ernst Klink; 6 step-children
- Awards: Golden Party Badge; Cross of Honour of the German Mother

Gertrud Emma Scholtz-Klink, born Treusch, later known under the alias Maria Stuckebrock (9 February 1902 – 24 March 1999), was a German official and member of the Nazi Party best known as the leader of the National Socialist Women's League (Nationalsozialistische Frauenschaft or NSF), a position she was appointed to by Adolf Hitler in 1934. She headed numerous other Party and government organizations for women and was the highest ranking female official in Nazi Germany. In this top position for women, she was partly responsible for the persecution, exclusion, and disenfranchisement of Jewish women. She was permitted to travel abroad for propaganda purposes, and was known in Britain as "The Perfect Nazi Woman".

Following the end of the Second World War, she underwent denazification proceedings and was adjudged a "major offender". An unrepentant Nazi, she lived another half-century and published a book in which she professed her continued belief in Nazi ideology.

== Early life, marriages and family ==
Gertrud Emma Treusch was born into a middle class family in Adelsheim where her father was the local district surveyor. When she was 2, the family moved to Eberbach where she later attended the local Volksschule. Her father died when she was 8, and from then on she and her two brothers were raised by her mother. They moved to nearby Mosbach where she attended the Gymnasium until age 16 and worked briefly as a nurse during the last stages of the First World War in 1918.

In April 1921, at age 19, Treusch married Eugen Klink, a former army officer and war veteran who worked as a secondary school teacher. He became a member of the Nazi Party and its paramilitary organization, the Sturmabteilung (SA). He also served a local Party speaker and as the acting Kreisleiter for the Offenburg district. The couple would have five children, one of whom died in infancy. In March 1930, Klink died of a heart attack at a Party rally. The widowed Frau Klink moved to Ellmindingen and, two years later, married a country physician by the name of Günther Scholtz, changing her surname to Scholtz-Klink. This marriage produced no children and ended in divorce in 1937. In December 1940, she married for a third time, to SS-Obergruppenführer August Heissmeyer, a high-ranking member of the Schutzstaffel (SS) and a widower with six children. This marriage produced one son, Hartmut, born in June 1944. The size of their combined family was the subject of much attention and praise by the Nazi press.

== Rise in the Nazi Party ==
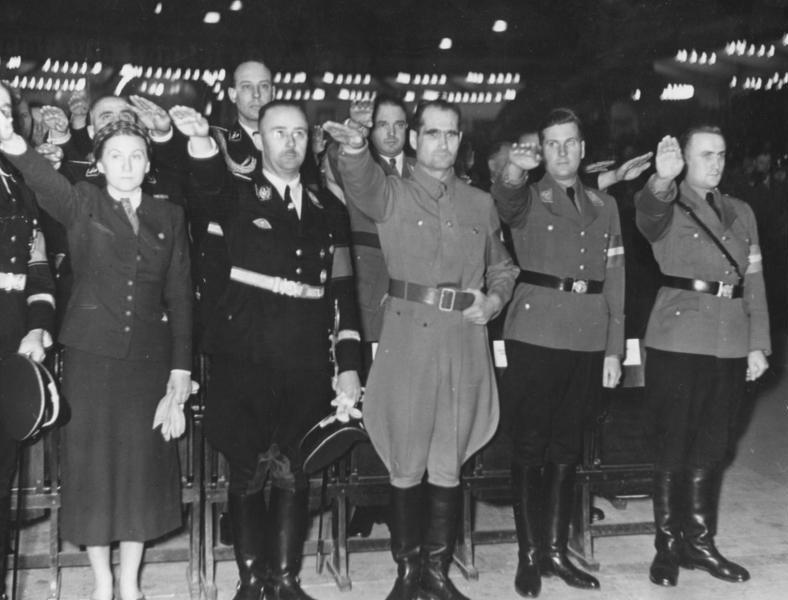
Scholtz-Klink at a Hitler Youth rally on 13 February 1939 alongside Heinrich Himmler, Rudolf Hess, Baldur von Schirach, and Artur Axmann

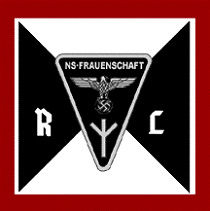
Personal standard of Scholtz-Klink as the Reichsfrauenführerin

Scholtz-Klink joined the Nazi Party in March 1930 and her membership was backdated to 1 September 1929 (membership number 157,007). As an early Party member, she later would be awarded the Golden Party Badge. In October 1930, with the support of her patron, Gauleiter Robert Heinrich Wagner, she was appointed leader of the Party's women's organization in Baden. By 1931, she also attained the leadership of the women's organization in Hesse. A gifted orator, she traveled throughout southwestern Germany recruiting women to the Party. In 1933, Wagner brought her into the Baden interior ministry as a consultant on women's issues and made her a leader of its labor service.

About a year after the Nazi seizure of power, Scholtz-Klink moved to Berlin on 1 January 1934 when Konstantin Hierl, head of the Reich Labor Service, appointed her as the leader of the German Women's Labor Service (Deutscher Frauenarbeitsdienst), a post she would retain until April 1936. Additional appointments followed in rapid succession. She was made the Reichsführerin of the Party's National Socialist Women's League (NSF) and the larger mass organization Deutsches Frauenwerk (German Women's Association) on 24 February 1934. She also was made leader of the Women's League of the German Red Cross in June and of the Women's Bureau of the German Labor Front in July. Additionally, she had the honor title of Reichsfrauenführerin (Reich Women's Leader) bestowed upon her by Adolf Hitler in November. She was made a member of the Academy for German Law in 1937.

== Activities as Reichsfrauenführerin ==
Scholtz-Klink became the public image of the model Aryan woman: blonde-haired, blue-eyed, slim, with braids pinned in a crown around her head and no makeup. She was usually attired in her NSF uniform, with a necktie and a starched blouse buttoned to the throat. At unofficial functions, she generally wore the traditional German dirndl. For the duration of the Nazi regime, she became the chief exemplar of the German woman and was known by many nicknames, including "First Lady of the Reich", "Reich Mother-in-Chief" and the derogatory "Reich Thundering Goat".

One of the first targets of the Reichsfrauenführerin was the large feminist movement, which had been active in the Weimar Republic. It was rapidly repressed, with its constituent organizations either banned outright or incorporated into the NSF. Leading feminists either left Germany or remained but retreated into a self-imposed silence.

Scholtz-Klink's main task was to promote male superiority, the joys of home, and the importance of child-bearing. Her philosophy of women's role in society hearkened back to the earlier German slogan of "Kinder, Küche, Kirche". In one speech, she declared that "the mission of woman is to minister in the home and in her profession to the needs of life from the first to last moment of man's existence". Her views even extended to condoning sexual violence against women. She once confided to a female colleague when discussing male domineering and bullying: "What woman could possibly object or not want to be forcibly taken by her man. If she is honest then every woman enjoys that". She viewed women's role in Nazi Germany as sacrosanct but subservient. It was the woman's duty to care for her body to ensure its maximum fertility, to produce as many children as possible for the state and to make a good home for her husband and children. In order to encourage an increase in the birth rate, incentives were established for larger families, and Mother's Day was celebrated as an official holiday from 1934. Beginning in 1939, women who bore four or more children were awarded the Cross of Honour of the German Mother, a state decoration, which was presented in three classes according to the number of children: bronze (4–5), silver (6–7) or gold (8 or more). Scholtz-Klink herself was awarded the golden cross in May 1944.

Despite her own position, Scholtz-Klink spoke against the participation of women in politics and held up the female politicians of the Weimar Republic as a bad example: "Those who have once heard the screaming of Communist and Social Democratic women in the streets, in parliament … know that a truly German woman will not lend herself to that". She claimed that for a woman to be involved in politics would blur the line between the sexes: she would have to act like a man to achieve something – which would damage her public image – or behave like a woman, which would prevent her from achieving anything. She concluded that, either way, nothing was gained from women seeking a role as politicians.

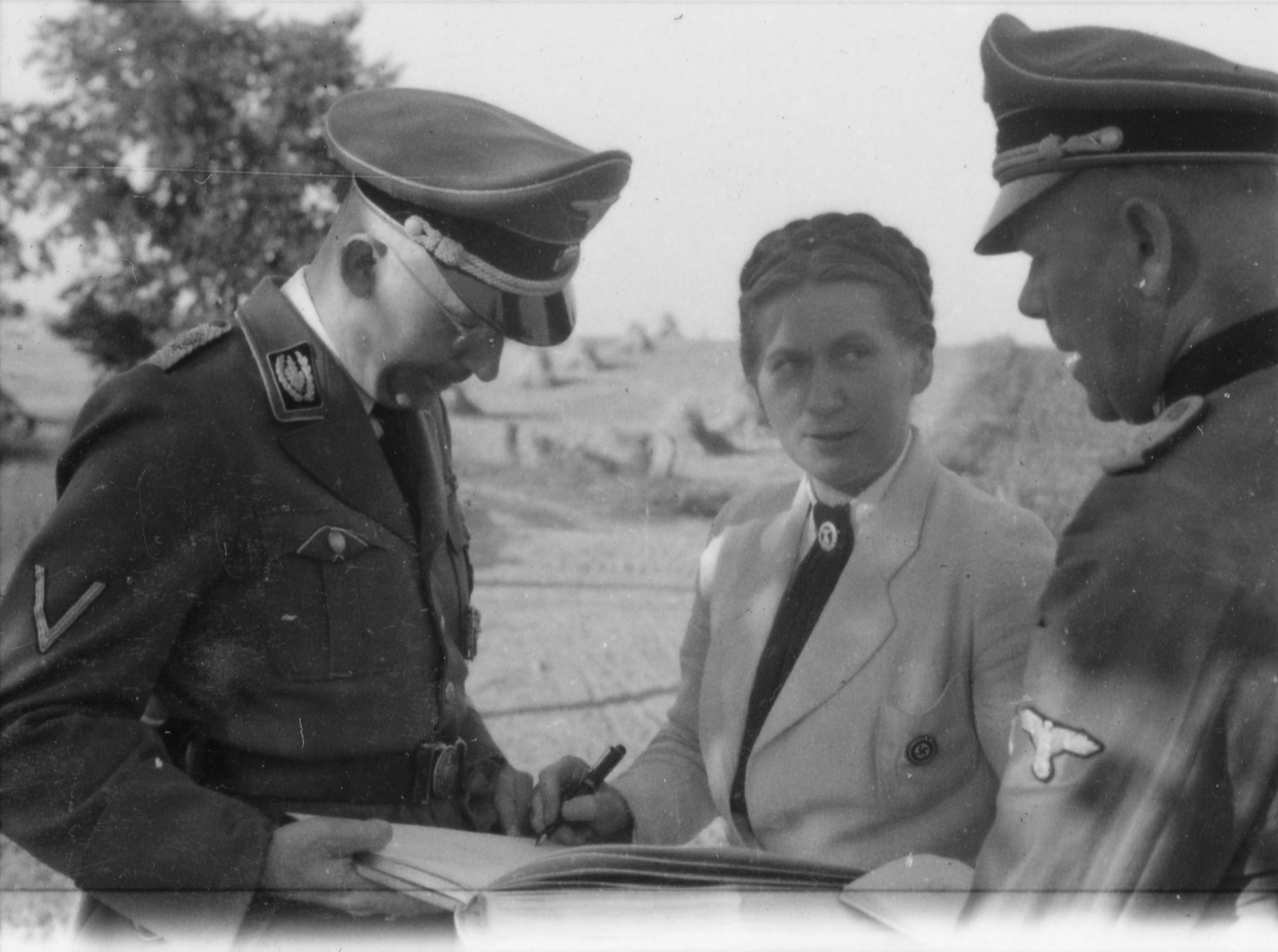
Scholtz-Klink in conversation with Heinrich Himmler (left) (August 1943)

For women completing secondary school, Scholtz-Klink introduced the concept of a "household year" as a prerequisite to university study, which with the assistance of skillful propaganda and anti-academic slogans, was meant to convince them to abandon further academic pursuits. Scholarship was labeled a strictly masculine pursuit. Instead, under the auspices of the Mothers' Service (Mütterdienst), Scholtz-Klink developed courses on childcare, cooking and sewing that were delivered to stay-at-home mothers in Home-Mother Schools. These courses were very popular and were attended by more than 1.7 million women by March 1939.

Beginning in 1936, Reichsführer-SS Heinrich Himmler mandated that women engaged to SS members undergo training in how to become wives who would conform to the Nazi ideal. Scholtz-Klink oversaw these so-called Reich Bride Schools that offered a combination of instruction in Nazi ideology (including race and genetics) and domestic chores such as shopping, cooking, sewing, gardening and caring for their husbands' uniforms, boots and daggers. Young brides-to-be would spend six weeks living together in groups of twenty in a villa at Schwanenwerder in Berlin. By 1940, there were nine such schools in Berlin alone, and additional ones throughout the country that remained active into May 1944.

In an account of the Nuremberg Party Rally of September 1935, Time magazine reported on a speech by Hitler to the women Party cadres assembled by the Reichsfrauenführerin and their reactions to it:

Fifty thousand German women and girls marshaled by hard-bosomed Gertrude Scholtzklink [sic], No. 1 female Nazi, hailed Herr Hitler with bursts of wild, ecstatic cheering which kept up for the whole 45 minutes that he addressed them in his happiest mood. "There are some things only a man can do!" cried this Apotheosis of the Little Man. "I exalt women as the stablest element in our Reich because woman judges with her heart, not with her head! … I would not be here now had not women supported me from the very beginning … We deny the Liberal-Jew-Bolshevik theory of 'women's equality' because it dishonors them! … A woman, if she understands her mission rightly, will say to a man: 'You preserve our people from danger and I shall give you children'." (Cries of 'Ja! Ja! Heil Hitler!') Many of the 50,000 women wept as they cheered, and Herr Hitler himself seemed on the point of tears …

As head of the Woman's Bureau of the German Labor Front, Scholtz-Klink had the responsibility of persuading women to work for the benefit of the Nazi government, and later, for the war effort. At the 1937 Nuremberg Party Rally, she stated that "even if our weapon is only the wooden spoon, its striking power will be no less than that of other weapons". At the 1938 rally, she argued that "the German woman must work and work, physically and mentally she must renounce luxury and pleasure".

For propaganda reasons, Nazi Germany showcased Scholtz-Klink to foreign countries as an influential leader in the Party, and she made many speaking trips abroad. She was known in Britain as "The Perfect Nazi Woman". However, she was usually left out of the more important meetings in the male-dominated leadership of the Party and the state, and was not consulted on issues beyond her narrow sphere of interest. She was considered to be a figurehead, and her views were reportedly not considered important by the Nazi leadership. Whenever there were conflicts over jurisdictional issues, she lost the argument, demonstrating what little actual political power she wielded.

Scholtz-Klink fully supported the Nazi racial policies against Jews. She was partly responsible for the persecution, exclusion, and disenfranchisement of Jewish women. She cautioned women against the "raceless talk of humanity" and supported "racial purity" as part of the "natural order". She declared Jews to be the "mortal enemy of the German nation" and urged women to avoid Jewish businesses: "Not a penny more to a Jewish store, no Jewish doctor, no Jewish lawyer for the German woman or the German family!"

Scholtz-Klink was also aware of the crimes of the Nazi regime. Her NSF was responsible for monitoring the forced domestic laborers used in private households in the Reich, and for a time she was involved in the selection and training of Nazi concentration camps guards. During the Second World War, she often accompanied her husband in his capacity as an inspector on frequent trips to concentration camps. Toward the end of the war, she was present with her husband when he commanded a Kampfgruppe (battle group) in Potsdam during the Battle of Berlin. Though she did not actively fight in the battle, she was seen wearing a camouflage uniform and carrying a sub-machine gun.

== Post-war life and prosecutions ==
A false news dispatch in mid-April 1945 reported that Scholtz-Klink killed herself in Konstanz. In actuality, she fled with Heissmeyer from Berlin before its capitulation. They destroyed their identity papers and uniforms, and after Germany's surrender, they were briefly interned in a Soviet prisoner of war camp near Magdeburg in the summer of 1945. They managed to convince their captors that they were refugees from the east and were released in September. With the assistance of Princess Pauline of Württemberg, whom Scholtz-Klink knew from her work with the German Red Cross, they went into hiding in Bebenhausen near Tübingen where they worked as domestic servants. They spent the subsequent three years under the aliases of Heinrich and Maria Stuckenbrock (his mother's maiden name). They even underwent a denazification process and were classified as Category V ("exonerated").

On 28 February 1948, the couple were identified and arrested by French occupation authorities. Put on trial for possession of false identity papers, they were convicted in April 1948 and sentenced to 18 months in prison in Rottenburg am Neckar before being released in August 1949. Returning to Tübingen, Scholtz-Klink again underwent denazification proceedings and this time was classified as a Category I ("major offender") on 17 November 1949. Sentenced to nineteen months, she was immediately released on the basis of time served. After a public outcry protesting the lenient sentence, an appeals court on 5 May 1950 sentenced her to 30 months in a labor camp. In addition, the court imposed a fine and banned her from engaging in political activities for life. She was deprived of her right to vote and to join political parties or unions, and prohibited from practicing the professions of journalism or teaching for ten years. After a successful appeal for clemency, she was able to avoid imprisonment, but the loss of civil rights remained in effect.

Scholtz-Klink settled back in Bebenhausen. In her 1978 book Die Frau im Dritten Reich ("The Woman in the Third Reich"), which she dedicated to "the victims of the Nuremberg trials", Scholtz-Klink professed her continuing support for Nazi ideology. She expressed no remorse or regret, instead praising Nazi Germany and glorifying Hitler. She once again upheld her position on Nazism in her interview with historian Claudia Koonz in 1981. Koonz stated that Scholtz-Klink put forward "pious excuses" and "rationalizations", and the author concluded that "this was not an ex-Nazi. She remained as much a Nazi now as she had been in 1945 or in 1933". Scholtz-Klink died on 24 March 1999 at age 97.

== Selected written works ==
- Verpflichtung und Aufgabe der Frau im nationalsozialistischen Staat, Junker und Dünnhaupt, Berlin, (1936).
- Über die Stellung der Frau im nationalsozialistischen Deutschland, (1939).
- Die Frau im Dritten Reich – Eine Dokumentation, Grabert Verlag, Tübingen, (1978).

== See also ==
- League of German Girls
- Women in Nazi Germany

== Sources ==
- Bartrop, Paul R.; Grimm, Eve E. (2019). Perpetrating the Holocaust: Leaders, Enablers, and Collaborators. ABC-CLIO. ISBN 978-1-440-85896-3.
- Berger, Christiane (2005) Doctoral Dissertation: Die "Reichsfrauenführerin" Gertrud Scholtz-Klink Zur Wirkung einer nationalsozialistischen Karriere in Verlauf, Retrospektive und Gegenwart. University of Hamburg.
- Evans, Richard J. (2005). The Third Reich in Power. New York: Penguin Press. ISBN 978-0-143-03790-3.
- "Fashioning a Nation – Gertrud Scholtz-Klink". Georgia Commission on the Holocaust.
- Guenther, Irene (2004): Nazi Chic?: Fashioning Women in the Third Reich, Berg Publishers, ISBN 978-1-859-73400-1.
- Heath, Tim (2017). Hitler's Girls: Doves Amongst Eagles. Pen and Sword Books Ltd. ISBN 978-1-526-70532-7.
- Kipp, Michaela (2014): Scholtz-Klink Biographic Timeline in Lebendiges Museum Online
- Koonz, Claudia (1987): Mothers in the Fatherland: Women, the Family, and Nazi Politics. Routledge. ISBN 978-0-312-54933-6.
- Kramer, Nicole (2007): Scholtz-Klink, Gertrud in the Deutsche Biographie.
- Livi, Massimiliano (2005). Gertrud Scholtz-Klink: Die Reichsfrauenführerin. Münster: Lit-Verlag. ISBN 978-3-8258-8376-8
- Miller, Michael D.; Schulz, Andreas (2015). Leaders of the SS & German Police. Vol. 2 Reichsführer SS – Gruppenführer (Hans Haltermann to Walter Kruger). R. James Bender Publishing. ISBN 978-1-932-97025-8.
- Sigmund, Anna Maria (2000). Women of the Third Reich. Nde Publishing. ISBN 978-1-553-21105-1.
- Williams, Max (2015). SS Elite: The Senior Leaders of Hitler's Praetorian Guard. Vol. 1. Fonthill Media LLC. ISBN 978-1-781-55433-3.
- Wistrich, Robert S. (1982). Who's Who in Nazi Germany. Macmillan Publishing Co. ISBN 0-02-630600-X.
- Zentner, Christian; Bedürftig, Friedemann, eds. (1997) [1991]. The Encyclopedia of the Third Reich. New York: Da Capo Press. ISBN 978-0-306-80793-0.
