= Reich Bride Schools =

Women's schools in Nazi Germany teaching domestic skills

- Reichsbräuteschule
- Formation: Late 1930s
- Dissolved: May 1944
- Type: Institutions
- Purpose: To train young women to be "perfect Nazi brides"

The Reich Bride Schools (German: Reichsbräuteschule) were institutions established in Nazi Germany in the late 1930s. They were created to train young women to be "perfect Nazi brides", indoctrinated in Nazi ideology and educated in housekeeping skills. The fiancées of prominent SS members and senior Nazi Party officials (and later a wider range of German women) were taught skills including cooking, child care, ironing and how to care for their husbands' uniforms and daggers. They were required to swear oaths of loyalty to Adolf Hitler, to pledge to raise their children as Nazis and to marry in what the Nazis alleged to be ceremonies based on pre-Christian model—ceremonies that Nazi officials presided over, rather than ceremonies in churches.

Although a number of bride schools were established in locations across Germany, the demands of the Second World War made it impossible for the Nazis to realise their ideal of women as being exclusively home-bound. Many women took up work instead in munitions factories and other war-related roles. Even so, the schools appear to have continued until as late as May 1944 but their existence faded from memory after the war, perhaps as a result of an unwillingness on the part of former Nazi brides to discuss their enrollment. The discovery in 2013 of original documentation relating to the schools resulted in attention being brought to this institution of Nazi Germany.

== Women in the Nazi worldview ==
Women had a clearly defined position in the Nazi worldview. They were not deemed suitable for professions such as medicine, the law or the civil service, from which they were banned. They were instead expected to stay at home, maintain the household and have as many children as possible. A woman's place was defined by the slogan "kinder, küche, kirche" ("children, kitchen, church"). Reproductive success was rewarded with the Ehrenkreuz der Deutschen Mutter (Cross of Honour of the German Mother), which was awarded in bronze, silver and gold ranks – the latter going to mothers who had eight or more children. The Nazis considered that the social changes that had taken place since the end of the First World War, including a fall in birth rates and an increasing number of divorces, were undermining German society and the German race. Large families and a reversion to traditional gender roles were seen as essential, not least as a means of breeding future soldiers. The Nazi government passed a Law for the Encouragement of Marriage which enabled newlyweds to take out a state loan of 1,000 reichsmarks (approximately €3,500) and keep a quarter for each child they had, in effect subsidising procreation.

Hitler told a conference of the National Socialist Women's League (NS-Frauenschaft) in September 1938, "The slogan 'Emancipation of women' was invented by Jewish intellectuals and its content was formed by the same spirit. In the really good times of German life the German woman had no need to emancipate herself ... If the man's world is said to be the State, his struggle, his readiness to devote his powers to the service of the community, then it may perhaps be said that the woman's is a smaller world. For her world is her husband, her family, her children, and her home." The Nazi viewpoint was summed up by Hermann Göring in his Nine Commandments for the Workers’ Struggle, published in 1934, in which he exhorted women to "take hold of the frying pan, dust pan, and broom, and marry a man." Young girls were compelled to join the League of German Girls (Bund Deutscher Mädel) while older women became members of the NS-Frauenschaft. Gertrud Scholtz-Klink, the head of the NS-Frauenschaft, told a Nazi party conference in 1935 that "women must be the spiritual caregivers and the secret queens of our people, called upon by fate for this special task."

== Establishment ==
In 1936, Reichsführer-SS Heinrich Himmler came to an agreement with Scholtz-Klink to put her views into practice, with Himmler issuing a decree ordering women engaged to SS members to undergo training in how to become brides who would conform to the Nazi ideal of how women should live. They were also to undergo training to provide them with "special knowledge of race and genetics." A newspaper article published at the time stated that the schools they would attend would aim "to mould housewives out of office girls."

Schools for mothers (Mütterschulen) were not a new phenomenon in Germany; the first had been established in Stuttgart in 1917. By 1933 there were 37 such institutions in Germany, aiming to counteract the high infant mortality rate that resulted from the poor diet, bad hygiene and arduous working lives of many women in Weimar Germany. Housekeeping was a much more complex and labour-intensive task than it is today, with tasks such as cleaning, laying a fire, shopping, cooking and looking after children requiring much more effort. After 1933 the Nazis saw Mütterschulen as providing not only a way of educating women in housekeeping, but a means of indoctrinating them in Nazi ideology. The administration of the Mütterschulen was taken over by the NS-Frauenschaft and the Deutsches Frauenwerk (German Women's Enterprise) and the number of women attending grew rapidly; by 1937, 1.14 million women had participated in over 53,000 courses.

The first Reich Bride School was established in 1937 on Schwanenwerder, an island in the Havel river in the Berlin locality of Nikolassee. It occupied a villa which served as a model household, in which groups of up to twenty young women would live for a six-week course. An official pamphlet stated: "In circles of 20 students, young girls should attend courses at the institute, preferably two months before their wedding day, to recuperate spiritually and physically, to forget the daily worries associated with their previous professions, to find the way and to feel the joy for their new lives as wives." They were charged 135 reichsmarks (equivalent to about €470 at today's prices) for the course. Other Reich Bride Schools were soon established; by 1940 there were nine in Berlin alone, and schools were also established in other German cities such as Oldenburg and Tübingen.

== Training and indoctrination ==
The training given at the schools included a variety of household skills such as cooking, ironing, gardening, child care and animal husbandry. Even interior design was addressed; an article in the magazine Das schöne Heim ("The Beautiful Home") described how Nazi brides were encouraged to adopt a "clear and clean" interior style in which only "German woods are used in beautiful grain." Other topics of study included how to make suitable conversation at cocktail parties, cleaning a husband's uniform and polishing a husband's boots and dagger. They were also taught German folk songs, legends and fairy tales to infuse them with a sense of "national community" (Volksgemeinschaft). The women were required to pledge to raise their children in accordance with National Socialist beliefs, to be loyal to Hitler throughout their lives and to marry in faux neo-pagan ceremonies led by Nazi Party members, rather than in church. On completion of the course, they were issued with certificates stamped with the Lebensrune symbolising life; if they dropped out, they were refused permission to marry.

The schools were initially aimed at educating the future wives of the Nazi elite – prominent members of the SS and the Nazi Party. Eventually they were opened to all "racially suitable" German women, thus excluding anyone with Jewish or gypsy heritage, physical disability, or a history of mental illness. Nazi propaganda publicised the schools' activities in articles such as one covering the Oldenburg Reich Bride School, published in May 1940 in the Frauen Warte, the Nazi Party's bi-weekly illustrated magazine for women. It showed in a series of photographs how the brides were taught how to use gardening tools, practising cooking and animal husbandry, picking and arranging flowers, and undergoing courses in cooking, sewing, and baby care, knitting and weaving. The accompanying text, written from the point of view of a young wife recalling her time at the Reich Bride School, says:

The days were full, the training thorough, and the evenings of reading, singing, and games were delightful. The future families they would have as wives and mothers were always at the center of the programme. That gave the six weeks [of the course] the unity and organization that so pleased the brides, creating that atmosphere of community that would last past the course. The fact that most of the girls were engaged to soldiers at the front strengthened the sense of togetherness, both in good and bad times. How happy the young woman is that she can still be with her husband. She wants to use weeks until he may be called up to build a comfortable home for him and make the few weekend hours he has at home warm and treasured.

According to Dr Marius Turda of Oxford Brookes University, "the bride schools perfectly illustrate the Nazi regime’s ambition to control its population, both privately and publicly. A good German wife was supposed to be a supportive mother and a promoter of racial values in the family." They also represented a political gambit by NS-Frauenschaft leader Gertrud Scholtz-Klink, whose collaboration with Himmler to set up the schools resulted in a politically valuable alliance between her organisation and the SS, a rising power within the Nazi establishment. According to the historian Michael Burleigh, the explicitly faux neo-pagan and anti-Christian stance of the bride schools was particularly noteworthy. Dr Julia Torrie of St Thomas University in New Brunswick notes that the underlying theme of the bride schools was that they defined the family as exclusively Aryan; as she puts it, "Exercising the kind of domesticity that a woman learnt at an SS bride school was, in a sense, 'living' her Nazism."

The Reich Bride Schools continued their activities until at least May 1944, but the pressures of war appear to have curtailed them before the final collapse of Nazi Germany the following year. Women took up new roles on the "home front", working in munitions factories or assisting the military. Although this contradicted the original idea of women being confined to the home, Scholtz-Klink justified it on the grounds that they now had a "higher obligation" that demanded their contributions to the war effort. After the war, the bride schools fell into obscurity and information about them is still scarce; as Marius Turda puts it, "It is possible that, after the war, former Nazis and their spouses who had graduated were rather reluctant to talk about these schools." However, in 2013, Nazi-era documentation about the schools was discovered in the German federal archives in Koblenz, including a rule book containing details of the oaths that brides had to swear and the certificates awarded to them at the end of their courses.
