= Margarete Gussow =

German astronomer

Margarete Gussow (born 1896) was a German astronomer.

== Biography ==
Gussow studied mathematics, astronomy and physics in Berlin. In 1924, she was made an assistant at the observatory. In 1933, she joined the Nazi Party. In 1936, she published work on Epsilon Aurigae.

In 1938, she became a fulltime observer.

Under the Weimar Republic, only 1% of university chairs were held by women. On June 8, 1937, a law passed that stated only men could be appointed to these chairs, except in the social field. Nevertheless, on February 21, 1938, "on an individual and exceptional basis" following the lobbying of the Reichsfrauenführerin Gertrud Scholtz-Klink, the highest official of the female branch of the Nazi Party, Gussow was granted a chair of astronomy. Gussow was featured in an edition of the Nazi publication NS-Frauen-Warte.

Gussow's fate after 1945 is unknown.
