= Gisela Bock =

German historian (1942–2025)

- Bock in the 1990s
- Born: 28 July 1942; Karlsruhe, Germany
- Died: 7 November 2025 (aged 83)
- Education: Free University Berlin
- Organizations: Free University Berlin; European University Institute; Bielefeld University

Gisela Bock (28 July 1942 – 7 November 2025) was a German historian, a pioneer of history of women and gender. She taught at the Free University Berlin, the European University Institute in Florence, Bielefeld University and again in Berlin until 2007.

== Life and career ==
Bock was born in Karlsruhe on 28 July 1942. Her father was a physicist. She grew up in a small town where only few girls made an academic career. Her excellent grades in mathematics and physics at a secondary school for girls earned her a scholarship. She then spent time as an exchange student at a secondary school in California, during which she became interested in history as a science about people. She studied in Freiburg, and from 1967 in Berlin, besides history also philosophy, political science and musicology, taking part in the Kritische Universität in 1967 and lectures by Klaus Heinrich and of Wilhelm Berges who agreed to supervise her dissertation. She was part of the student organisation AStA. She studied further in Paris and Rome. She achieved her doctorate at the Free University Berlin (FU) in 1971, with a dissertation on early modern intellectual history in Italy, focusing on the philosopher Tommaso Campanella. She then taught at the Free University Berlin from 1971 to 1983. She also worked politically at the time, as one of the founders of the Autonomes Frauenzentrum Westberlin and translated a book by Mariarosa Dalla Costas and Selma James into German as "Die Macht der Frauen und der Umsturz der Gesellschaft", which became a bible of the autonomous women's movement. In 1976, she was among the organisers of the first Sommer University for women at the FU.

In the 1970s, Bock was active in the international campaign for "wages for/against housework", initiating the Berlin group (Lohn für Hausarbeit), which organized conferences and published in the monthly feminist magazine Courage from 1975 to 1979. She received a Kennedy fellowship at Harvard University in 1974/75. She attended, with around 2000 others, a formative event, the 1975 Berkshire Conference of Women Historians, where historians such as Gerda Lerner and Natalie Zemon Davis spoke. Bock became one of the pioneers in the emergence and establishment of "women and gender" history also in Germany. She founded with a few other women a Summer University in Berlin in 1976.

Bock wrote her 1984 habilitation about the compulsory sterilization under the Nazi Regime. Published as a book in 1986, it became a standard work. She studied the around 400,000 compulsory sterilizations performed in Nazi Germany on "genetically inferior" men and women, examining the history of sterilization in Nazi Germany with respect to the perpetrators as well as the victims, both women and men. The sterilisations seemed to concern men and women equally, but the surgery for women was more dangerous; among the around 5000 deaths caused by the surgery, 90% were women; most of them died when they trying to resist forced infertility.

She was professor at the European University Institute in Florence from 1985 to 1989, at Bielefeld University from 1989 to 1997, and then again at the Free University in Berlin until her retirement in 2007. She was a co-founder of the International Federation for Research in Women's History in 1987. In 1999, she published a study of women's suffrage around 1900, a broad international comparison of the different chronologies in the development of international electoral law. Bock is best known for her theoretical articles on gender history and the 2000 volume Women in European History, published in many languages.

Bock reviewed her academic career from a feminist perspective in an interview with Cillie Rentmeister. She was awarded the Order of Merit of the Federal Republic of Germany in 2018.

Bock died on 7 November 2025, at the age of 83.

== Works ==
German

- Thomas Campanella: politisches Interesse und philosophische Spekulation, Tübingen: Niemeyer, 1974. ISBN 978-3-484-80069-4
- Die andere Arbeiterbewegung in den USA von 1905–1922: Die Industrial Workers of the World München: Trikont, 1976. ISBN 978-3-88167-005-0
- co-written with Barbara Duden: "Arbeit aus Liebe – Liebe als Arbeit: zur Entstehung der Hausarbeit im Kapitalismus" in Frauen und Wissenschaft: Beiträge zur Berliner Sommeruniversität für Frauen Juli 1976, 1977. Dozentinnen, Gruppe Berliner (1976). Frauen und Wissenschaft (in German). Berlin: Courage-Verl. ISBN 3-921710-00-6.
- Zwangssterilisation im Nationalsozialismus: Studien zur Rassenpolitik und Frauenpolitik, Opladen: Westdeutscher Verlag, 1986. Reprint 2010. ISBN 978-3-531-11759-1
- Frauen in der europäischen Geschichte, München: C.H.Beck 2000, 2005. ISBN 978-3-406-52795-1
- (edited with Margarete Zimmermann), Die europäische Querelle des Femmes: Geschlechterdebatten seit dem 15. Jahrhundert, Stuttgart; Weimar: Metzler, 1997. ISBN 978-3-476-01526-6, doi:10.1007/978-3-476-03690-2
- (editor), Genozid und Geschlecht. Jüdische Frauen im nationalsozialistischen Lagersystem, Frankfurt am Main/New York: Campus 2005. ISBN 978-3-593-37730-8
- edited with Daniel Schönpflug, Friedrich Meinecke in seiner Zeit, Stuttgart 2006. ISBN 978-3-515-08962-3
- edited with Gerhard A. Ritter, Friedrich Meinecke. Neue Briefe und Dokumente, München: Oldenbourg Wissenschaftsverlag 2012. ISBN 978-3-486-70702-1

English

- "Women's History and Gender History: Aspects of an International Debate," in Gender and History, Volume 1, 1989, pp. 7–doi:10.1111/j.1468-0424.1989.tb00232.x
- co-edited with Quentin Skinner and Maurizio Viroli, Machiavelli and Republicanism, Cambridge University Press 1990. ISBN 978-0-521-43589-5
- co-edited with Pat Thane, Maternity and Gender Policies: Women and the Rise of the European Welfare States, 1880s–1950s, London 1991. ISBN 978-0-415-04774-6
- co-edited with Susan James, Beyond Equality and Difference: Citizenship, Feminist Politics and Female Subjectivity, London 1992. ISBN 978-0-415-07989-1
- Women in European history Oxford; Malden, Mass.: Blackwell, 2002. ISBN 978-0-631-19145-2
- "Challenging Dichotomies: Perspectives on Women's History." In Writing Women's History: International Perspectives, ed. Karen Offen, Ruth Roach Pierson, and Jane Rendall, Bloomington: Indiana University Press, pp. 1–23. ISBN 978-0-333-54161-6, doi:10.1007/978-1-349-21512-6_1
- Ordinary Women in Nazi Germany: Perpetrators, Victims, Followers, and Bystanders. In Women in the Holocaust, ed. Dalia Ofer and Lenore J. Weitzman, New Haven & London 1998, pp. 85–100. ISBN 0-300-07354-2
