= Deutsches Frauenwerk =

Nazi association for women

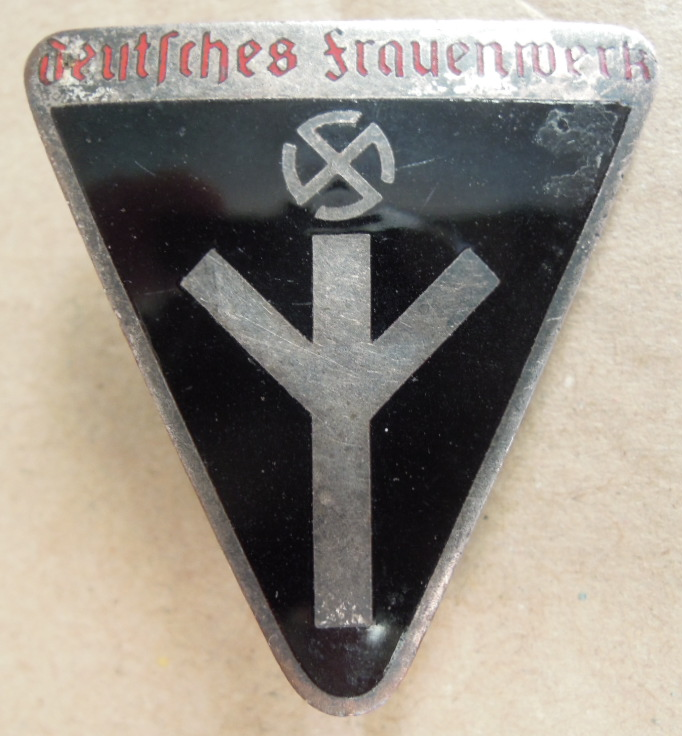
Membership badge of the Deutsches Frauenwerk

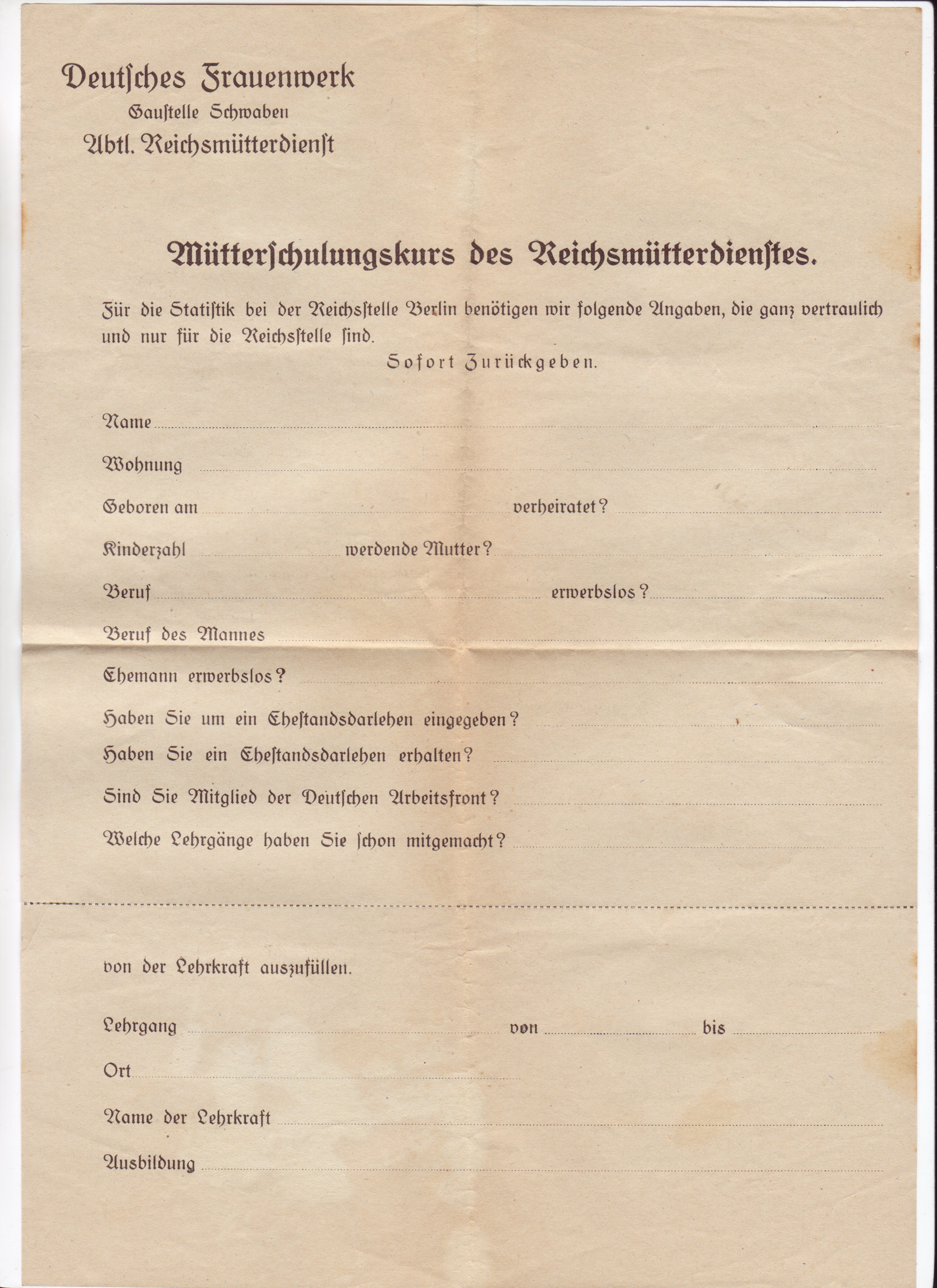
Letter of acceptance

The Deutsches Frauenwerk (DFW) was a National Socialist Association for German women. It was created in October 1933.

== History ==
Alongside the NS-Frauenschaft, it served as a rallying point for former members of the women's associations of the Weimar Republic. These included nationalist and conservative-oriented women's associations such as the Bund Königin Luise, the Evangelisches Frauenwerk, the Sisterhood of the German Red Cross, and the Reich League of German Housewives. Approximately 1.7 million German women were organized in the DFW, and about 2.3 million in the NS-Frauenschaft.

== See also ==
- League of German Girls
- Cross of Honour of the German Mother
- Women in Nazi Germany
