= German Youth in Slovakia =

World War 2nd era youth organization

The German Youth in Slovakia (German: Deutsche Jugend in der Slowakei, abbreviated D.J.) was a youth organization in the Second World War Slovak Republic. The organization functioned as the youth wing of the German Party. DJ was modelled after the Hitler Youth in the German Reich. The leader (Landesleiter) of DJ was F. Klug.

DJ functioned as a 'bridge' between the Hitler Youth and the Slovak Hlinka Youth. During the parade in Bratislava celebrating the January 18, 1939, inaugural session of the new Diet of the Slovak Land, DJ members in brown shirts joined the march.

DJ grew quickly and organized youngsters all across the country in places where ethnic German populations lived. The organization conducted active propaganda campaigns, and conducted training activities in National Socialist doctrine in areas where there were no German schools. In January 1939 DJ claimed to have around 12,000 members, by 1940 the number of claimed members had increased to 17,400. By 1941 DJ claimed to have around 18,000 members organized in some 150 local groups. The local DJ groups were organized into three Banne (Battalions). The membership of DJ consisted of youth aged 10 to 18 years old; boys aged 10 to 14 years were grouped into Deutsches Jungvolk (like the Deutsches Jungvolk in the Reich), boys aged 14 to 18 in Deutsche Jugend, girls aged 10 to 14 in Jungmädelbund (like the Jungmädelbund in the Reich) and girls aged 15 to 14 in Bund Deutscher Mädel (like the BDM in the Reich).

DJ used a uniform almost identical to the ones used by the Hitler Youth in the Reich, except that the emblem of the organization included a swastika on a shield.

DJ members were recruited for military service in the war against Poland in September 1939. Through decree no. 311 issued December 21, 1939, the Slovak government recognized Freiwillige Schutzstaffel and DJ as paramilitary organizations operating within the frame of the German Party. As the Second World War progressed, many of the DJ members went on to serve in the German Waffen-SS.

In the midst of the 1944 Slovak National Uprising, the Slovak National Council declared DJ dissolved in one of its first acts of legislation.
