= Pimpf =

Pimpf may refer to:

- Pimpfe, a German nickname for a boy before the voice change and the youngest members of the Hitler Youth organization in Nazi Germany
- Der Pimpf, the Nazi magazine for boys
- "Pimpf" (song), the B-side of Depeche Mode's 1987 single "Strangelove"
- "Pimpf", a short story by Charles Stross in his 2006 story collection The Jennifer Morgue
