= Das Deutsche Mädel =

Teen's magazine in Germany

- August 1941 cover of Das deutsche Mädel and the first issue following the Nazi invasion of the Soviet Union. The caption reads "Weary and ruined faces characterize the neglected children of the Soviet state. Cheerful and healthy on the other hand, the youth of Greater Germany are participating in sports festivals everywhere in the country."
- Categories: Girls'
- Frequency: Monthly
- Founded: 1933
- Final issue: 1942
- Country: Germany
- Language: German

Das Deutsche Mädel (German: [das ˈdɔʏtʃə ˈmɛːdl̩]; The German Girl) was a Nazi propaganda magazine aimed at girls, particularly members of the League of German Girls. In fact, it was the official organ of the League. The magazine was published on a monthly basis between 1933 and 1942.

Unlike the adventure orientation of Der Pimpf, intended for Hitler Youth, Das deutsche Mädel advocated for hiking, tending the wounded, hard work in factories, and preparing for motherhood. On the other hand, in contrast to the woman's magazine with some propaganda, NS-Frauen-Warte, it placed much greater emphasis on the strong and active German woman; health, education, service, and sports all featured, and famous women depicted included doctors, athletes, poets, and pilots.

Articles in the magazine included a description of the speech by Jutta Rüdiger upon her appointment as leader of The League of German Girls, guidance for girls who had just joined the Jungmädelbund of their duties to Germany, and a story of how Young Girls had ensured that a dead father's promise to his son was fulfilled.
