= Trude Mohr =

German administrator (1902–1989)

Trude Mohr (later Trude Bürkner-Mohr) (12 September 1902 – 1989) was the first Reichsreferentin of the Bund Deutscher Mädel (BDM).

== Early life ==
She was born in 1902 to a German nationalist family. She never completed gymnasium, and joined the German nationalist youth movement by the 1920s, becoming a Bund Deutscher Mädel leader. She found employment in the postal service.

== NSDAP and BDM ==
In 1928 she joined the NSDAP (Nazi Party), and in 1930 she was assigned the task of establishing a BDM in a Brandenburg district as an arm of the Hitler Youth. She became its leader in 1931, and by 1932 her group was the second largest in the country.

When the Hitler Youth was suspended for excessive violence in 1932, the BDM was as well. This did not deter Mohr or her staff, and they carried on the activities of the organization.

After internal feuding, it was restored and in 1933 she was given leave from her employment with the postal service to be able to devote herself to the greater establishment of the BDM. She was appointed the first Reichsreferentin in June 1934. Her main initiative was to nourish a new way of living for the German youth, stating:

"Our volk need a generation of girls which is healthy in body and mind, sure and decisive, proudly and confidently going forward, one which assumes its place in everyday life with poise and discernment, one free of sentimental and rapturous emotions, and which, for precisely this reason, in sharply defined feminity, would be the comrade of a man, because she does not regard him as some sort of idol but rather as a companion! Such girls will then, by necessity, carry the values of National Socialism into the next generation as the mental bulwark of our people."

=== Resignation and legacy ===
In 1937, after marrying Obersturmführer Wolf Bürkner, she became pregnant and resigned her duties. Party rules required that any female leader was to be unmarried. At the time of her resignation, the organization had grown to 2.7 million members. She was succeeded by Jutta Rüdiger. In an interview in 1980, she stated she was devoted to a single idea for her whole life, and was not ashamed of it.

== Later life ==
After her resignation, she took a position with Hermann Göring Works administering social welfare services to employees. Her application for a coveted low-ranking party position was not accepted, resulting in her increasing efforts to obtain such. In June 1945 she was captured and briefly imprisoned by the British, and then became a housewife. In 1953 she stood unsuccessfully in the elections for the Landtag of Lower Saxony and the Bundestag as a candidate for the All-German Bloc/League of Expellees and Deprived of Rights. From 1953 to 1980 she worked in social welfare for German corporations.
