= NSSB =

NSSB can refer to the following:

- National Socialist Schoolchildren's League (Nationalsozialistischer Schülerbund), also known under the acronym "NSS"
- Swiss National Socialist League (Nationalsozialistischer Schweizerbund)
