= Faith and Beauty Society =

Youth organization of the Nazi party for girls

Emblem of the BDM-Werk Glaube und Schönheit

The BDM-Werk Glaube und Schönheit (German for BDM Faith and Beauty Society) was founded in 1933 to serve as a tie-in between the work of the League of German Girls (BDM) and that of the National Socialist Women's League. Membership was voluntary and open to girls aged 17 to 21.

== Purpose ==
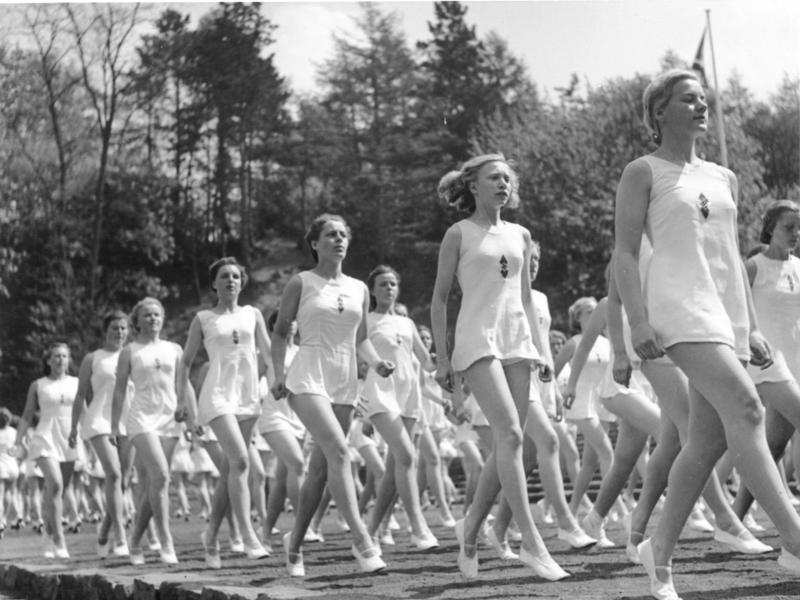
BDM girls dancing the Saxon Greeting in 1941

Nazi Germany's Reichsjugendführer (RJF; "National Youth Leader") Baldur von Schirach established the Faith and Beauty Society in 1938 to act as a link between the Bund Deutscher Mädel (BDM) and the Nationalsozialistische Frauenschaft. The general idea was that "girls" should take part in working for the whole Volksgemeinschaft (German community) before they either went on to jobs or – ideally – to marry and have children.

The organization was voluntary and usually only met two to three hours a week. The Society, initially run by Clementine zu Castell-Rüdenhausen, mainly aimed toward priming the young women for their future tasks as wives and mothers, and courses offered ranged from fashion design, cooking, sewing, weaving, first aid, to a range of sports (hiking, archery, ice skating). The overall idea was to teach young German women home economics so they would "properly" run their households, cook well for their families, and care properly for their children.

According to Dr. Jutta Rüdiger, who had taken over as the leader of the League of German Girls in 1937:

The task of our Girls League is to raise our girls as torch bearers of the national-socialist world. We need girls who are at harmony between their bodies, souls, and spirits. And we need girls who, through healthy bodies and balanced minds, embody the beauty of divine creation. We want to raise girls who believe in Germany and our leader, and who will pass these beliefs on to their future children.

Members also carried out work in the areas of home help, store and office help, nursing, and troop support, particularly as World War II went on and manpower became strained. In the 1940s, new work groups, such as Luftschutz (air raid warden services) and Nachrichtenwesen (which encompassed operating a radio and using morse code) were introduced.

== See also ==
- Saxon Greeting

== Sources ==
- "Das BDM Werk Glaube und Schoenheit" DVD, Zeitreisen Verlag
- "Ein Leben fuer die Jugend" by Dr. Jutta Ruediger
- BDM Historical Research Site
