= Der Pimpf =

Nazi magazine for boys

- First issue: 1935 (as Morgen)
- Final issue: 1944
- Country: Nazi Germany
- Language: German

Der Pimpf (German: [deːɐ̯ ˈpɪmpf], "The Boy") was the Nazi magazine for boys, particularly those in the Deutsches Jungvolk, with adventure and propaganda. It first appeared in 1935 as Morgen, changing its name to Der Pimpf in 1937; its publication ceased in July, 1944.

It included adventures of troops of Hitler Youth. Its last issue urged the boys to model themselves on the SS, and spoke of the SS Division "Hitler Jugend".

The female counterpart, Das deutsche Mädel, lacked this emphasis on adventure.

== Origin of name ==
The word Pimpf is slang for any member of the German Youth Movement, but later especially of the Deutsches Jungvolk, the youngest tier of the Hitler Youth. Its meaning in Upper German is "boy", "little rascal", "scamp", or "rapscallion", originally "little fart".
