= Theodor Adrian von Renteln =

German Nazi Party official (1897–1960)

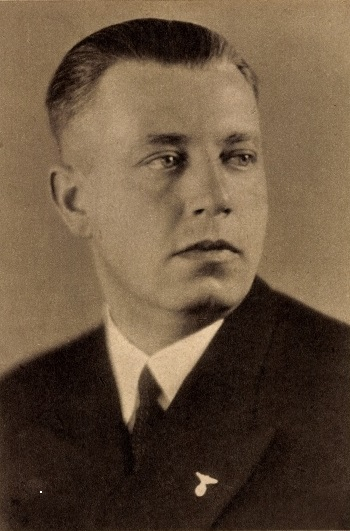
- Renteln c. 1936

Generalkommissar, Generalbezirk Litauen
- In office 25 July 1941 – 1 August 1944
- Preceded by: Position created
- Succeeded by: Position abolished

Chairman, Supreme Court of Honor and Discipline, German Labour Front
- In office October 1935 – 1941

President, Association of German Chambers of Industry and Commerce
- In office 22 June 1933 – 1935

Leader, National Socialist Combat League for the Commercial Middle Class (from August 1933, NS-HAGO)
- In office December 1932 – 1935

Additional positions
- 1936–1941: Hauptamtsleiter, Nazi Party Reichsleitung
- 1933–1945: Reichstag Deputy
- 1932: Reichstag Deputy
- 1931–1932: Reichsführer, Hitler Youth
- 1929–1932: Reichsführer, National Socialist Schoolchildren's League

Personal details
- Born: 15 September 1897 Chodzy, Sennensky Uyezd, Mogilev Governorate, Russian Empire
- Died: 24 October 1960 (aged 63) Madrid, Spain
- Resting place: Cementerio civil de Madrid
- Party: Nazi Party
- Spouse: Anna Erna Friede Auguste von Renteln (1900–1993)
- Education: Humboldt University of Berlin; University of Rostock
- Profession: Journalist
- Known for: Holocaust perpetrator in Lithuania

Military service
- Allegiance: Russian Empire; Ukrainian State
- Branch/service: Imperial Russian Army; Ukrainian Hetmanate Army
- Years of service: 1916–1918
- Rank: Cornet
- Unit: 11th "Izyum" Hussar Regiment
- Battles/wars: World War I

Theodor Adrian von Renteln (15 September 1897 – 24 October 1960) was a Baltic German who was conscripted to fight in the Imperial Russian Army during World War I. After the end of the war, he emigrated to Germany and joined the Nazi Party in 1929. He held several positions, including as an early leader of the Hitler Youth and the National Socialist Schoolchildren's League, as the leader of the Main Office for Industry and Trade in the Party's national leadership, and as a senior executive in the German Labour Front. In the early years of the Nazi regime, he was a leader in organizing boycotts of Jewish businesses. He also served as a deputy in the Reichstag between 1932 and 1945.

During World War II, after the German occupation of the Lithuanian SSR, Renteln was the sole General Commissioner of Generalbezirk Litauen and was involved in perpetrating the Holocaust in Lithuania, which resulted in the deaths of an estimated 190,000 to 195,000 Jews. The circumstances surrounding his disappearance at the end of the war were unclear, and it was long believed that the Soviet Union executed him for war crimes in 1946. However, later investigation revealed evidence that he eluded capture, lived in Spain under an assumed name and died of natural causes in Madrid in 1960.

== Early life, education and war service ==
Renteln was descended from a Baltic German noble family of Westphalian origin that migrated to Lübeck in the 13th century and, during the expansion of the Hanseatic League in the 15th century, to Reval (today, Tallinn, Estonia). He was born in 1897 at Chodzy, a village in the Mogilev Governorate (today located in Belarus). From 1905 to 1908, he attended a preparatory school, followed by a German Stadtgymnasium in Riga and Dorpat from 1908 to 1916.

In July 1916, Renteln enrolled at the Imperial Alexander Lyceum in Saint Petersburg, but in October, he was conscripted into the Imperial Russian Army to serve in World War I. After graduating from the Tsar Nicholas I Cavalry Officer School in Saint Petersburg, he was commissioned as a cornet of reserves in October 1917 and assigned to the 11th "Izyum" Hussar Regiment. During the final months of that year, the regiment was stationed in Ukraine. After Russia's withdrawal from the war in March 1918 under the terms of the Treaty of Brest-Litovsk, he joined the army of the Ukrainian State and served as a staff officer.

== Post-war life in the Weimar Republic ==
Renteln emigrated to Germany with the withdrawing German army in early 1919, and studied law and economics at the universities of Berlin and Rostock from 1920, earning a doctorate in 1924. He worked as a freelance journalist between 1924 and 1929, focusing on economic and national political issues. He traveled to a number of European countries and attended League of Nations sessions in Geneva, as well as numerous international conferences. He also published articles in newspapers across Germany, Finland, Hungary and Sweden.

== Nazi Party career ==
In January 1929, Renteln joined the Nazi Party (membership number 109,184). He also joined the Party's paramilitary unit, the Sturmabteilung (SA). He held successive positions as a group leader of the National Socialist Students' League, as a Gauredner (regional Party speaker) and head of the economic policy commission in Berlin. In November 1929, he became the founder and head of the National Socialist Schoolchildren's League (NSS). In November 1931, Adolf Hitler appointed him the Reichsführer of the Hitler Youth in place of Kurt Gruber. In March 1931, Renteln was also appointed to the economic policy department of the Nazi Party's Reichsleitung (national leadership) in Munich, where he served successively as a policy official, head of the division for monetary, currency, and credit issues, director of the economic policy department, and deputy head of Main Department IV (Economy). On 16 July 1932, he stepped down from his leadership roles within the youth organizations to focus exclusively on his work in economic policy. His successor as head of the Hitler Youth was Baldur von Schirach. By 1936, he attained the rank of Hauptamtsleiter (main office leader) of the Main Office for Industry and Trade in the Party's central leadership.

In December 1932, the National Socialist Combat League for the Commercial Middle Class (Nationalsozialistischer Kampfbund für den gewerblichen Mittelstand) was newly established under Renteln's leadership. (On 7 August 1933, it would be renamed the National Socialist Organization for Crafts, Trade, and Industry (Nationalsozialistische Handwerks-, Handels- und Gewerbeorganisation, or NS-HAGO.) It's chief aim was to bring middle class commercial trade associations within its sphere of control. Within a few weeks of the Nazi seizure of power, it succeeded in penetrating the existing associations of handicrafts and trade, and enforced organizational and personnel changes. By the second week of March 1933, it began boycotts of Jewish businesses, as well as large department and chain stores. On 29 March 1933, Renteln also was made a member of the Central Committee for Deflecting Jewish Atrocity and Boycott-Mongering, which organized the nationwide Nazi boycott of Jewish businesses on 1 April, and other forms of persecution.

The managing board of the Association of German Chambers of Industry and Commerce was displaced in May 1933 and, on 22 June 1933, Renteln formally was elected president of the organization by the purged plenary assembly. He held this position until 1935, when this organization and the NS-HAGO were merged into the German Labour Front (DAF), under Robert Ley. Renteln became a senior executive in the DAF, serving as chief of staff (Stabsleiter) from January 1935 and as the chairman of its Supreme Court of Honor and Discipline from October.

In March 1935, Bernhard Rust, head of the Reich Ministry of Science, Education and Culture, appointed Renteln the director of the Institute for Applied Economic Sciences at Leipzig University, where he became an honorary professor in 1936. In 1939, he was made a member of the Academy for German Law, headed by Hans Frank. He also held posts as president of the German Cooperative Association, and as the president of the German-Belgian Society in Berlin.

In addition to his numerous administrative duties, Renteln was also active in electoral politics. He was elected to the Reichstag on the Nazi Party electoral list at the July 1932 German parliamentary election. Losing his seat at the November 1932 election, Renteln was returned to the Reichstag in November 1933 from constituency 5, Frankfurt an der Oder. At the 1936 election, he switched to constituency 4, Potsdam, and he retained this seat until the fall of the Nazi regime in May 1945.

== Holocaust activity in Lithuania during World War II ==
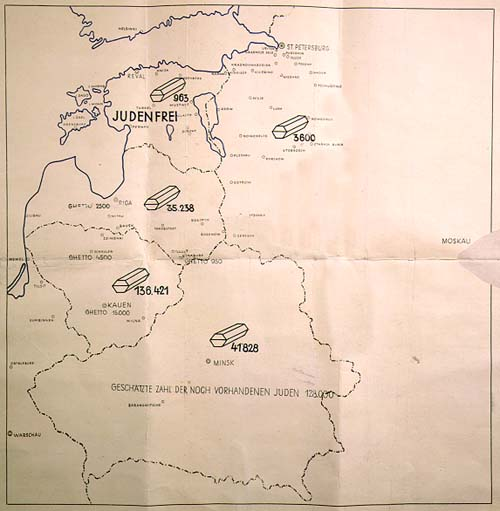
Map titled "Jewish Executions Carried Out by Einsatzgruppe A" documenting 136,421 Jews killed in Lithuania by January 1942 during Renteln's tenure as Generalkommissar.

On 25 July 1941, following the German invasion of the Soviet Union and the occupation of the Lithuanian SSR, Renteln—with his background as a Baltic German—was appointed as the head of the newly-installed civil administration, with the title of Generalkommissar of Generalbezirk Litauen. Almost immediately, he took harsh measures against the Jewish population, including isolating the Kaunas (Kovno) Ghetto on 26 August 1941, by ordering all telephones and lines ripped out, postal service cut off and bridges surrounded with barbed wire fences to prevent people from jumping. This order also forbade the Jews to use doors, window frames, or houses for fuel. In 1943, he was implicated in the plundering and liquidation of the Vilnius (Vilna) Ghetto, deporting an estimated 20,000 Jews to concentration or death camps. During his tenure as Generalkommissar, approximately 95% of the Jews in Lithuania were murdered.

== Post-war life and death ==
For decades after the end of World War II, it was believed that Renteln had been captured by the Red Army, put on trial, convicted and hanged for war crimes by the Soviet Union in 1946. No definitive confirmation of this was ever released by Soviet authorities and, according to other sources, Renteln fled from Germany to South America and lived there under a false identity. In 2025, newly-discovered evidence revealed that Renteln had lived in Madrid, Spain under the assumed name of "Karl Jacobson" prior to his death of lung cancer on 24 October 1960. He was buried in the Cementerio civil de Madrid, where his real name was annotated on the gravesite registry and was inscribed on his tombstone. His wife, Anna Erna Friede Auguste von Renteln, also was buried there on 7 September 1993.

== Sources ==
- Broszat, Martin (1981). The Hitler State: The Foundation and Development of the Internal Structure of the Third Reich. New York: Longman Inc. ISBN 978-0-582-48997-4.
- Das Deutsche Führerlexikon 1934–1935. Berlin: Verlagsanstalt Otto Stollberg G. m. b. H. 1934.
- Information about Theodor Adrian von Renteln in the Reichstag database
- Klee, Ernst (2007). Das Personenlexikon zum Dritten Reich. Wer war was vor und nach 1945. Frankfurt-am-Main: Fischer-Taschenbuch-Verlag. ISBN 978-3-596-16048-8.
- Miller, Michael D.; Schulz, Andreas (2021). Gauleiter: The Regional Leaders of the Nazi Party and Their Deputies, 1925–1945. Vol. 3 (Fritz Sauckel – Hans Zimmermann). Fonthill Media. ISBN 978-1-781-55826-3.
- Newspaper clippings about Theodor Adrian von Renteln in the 20th Century Press Archives of the ZBW
- Stockhorst, Erich (1985). 5000 Köpfe: Wer War Was im 3. Reich. Kiel: Arndt Verlag. ISBN 978-3-887-41116-9.
