= Deutsches Jungvolk =

Youth organization of the Nazi party for boys

German Youngsters in the Hitler Youth
- Deutsches Jungvolk in der Hitlerjugend
- Formation: 1928
- Dissolved: 1945
- Type: Political youth organisation
- Legal status: Defunct, illegal
- Region served: Nazi Germany
- Parent organization: Nazi Party
- Affiliations: Hitler Youth
- Formerly called: Jungmannschaften

The Deutsches Jungvolk in der Hitlerjugend (pronounced [ˈdɔʏtʃəs ˈjʊŋfɔlk]; DJ, also DJV; German for "German Youngsters in the Hitler Youth", lit. 'German Young People') was the separate section for boys aged 10 to 14 of the Hitler Youth organisation in Nazi Germany. Through a programme of outdoor activities, parades and sports, it aimed to indoctrinate its young members in the tenets of Nazi ideology. Membership became fully compulsory for eligible boys in 1939. By the end of World War II in Europe, some had become child soldiers. After the end of the war in 1945, both the Deutsches Jungvolk and its parent organization, the Hitler Youth, ceased to exist.

== Development ==
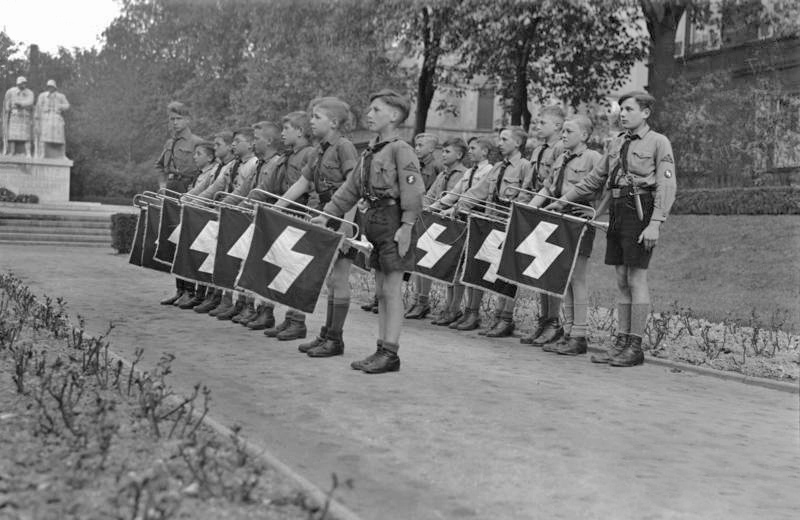
Deutsches Jungvolk fanfare trumpeters at a Nazi rally in the town of Worms in 1933. Their banners illustrate the Deutsches Jungvolk rune insignia.

The Deutsches Jungvolk was founded in 1928 by Kurt Gruber under the title Jungmannschaften ("Youth Teams"), but it was renamed Knabenschaft in December 1928 and became the Deutsches Jungvolk in der Hitlerjugend in March 1931. Both the Deutsches Jungvolk (DJ or DJV) and Hitler Youth (HJ) modelled parts of their uniforms and programmes on those of the German Scouting associations and of other youth groups, which were banned by the Nazi government during 1933 and 1934.

Following the enactment of the Law on the Hitler Youth on 1 December 1936, boys had to be registered with the Reich Youth Office in the March of the year in which they would reach the age of ten; those who were found to be racially acceptable were expected to join the DJ. Although not compulsory, the failure of eligible boys to join the DJ was seen as a failure of civic responsibility on the part of their parents.

The regulations were tightened further on 25 March 1939 by the Second Execution Order to the Law on the Hitler Youth ("Youth Service Regulation"), which made membership of the DJ or Hitler Youth mandatory for all Germans between 10 and 18 years of age. Parents could be fined or imprisoned for failing to register their children. Boys were excluded if they had previously been found guilty of "dishonourable acts", if they were found to be "unfit for service" for medical reasons, or if they were Jewish. Ethnic Poles or Danes living in the Reich (this was before the outbreak of World War II) could apply for exemption, but were not excluded.

== Training and activities ==
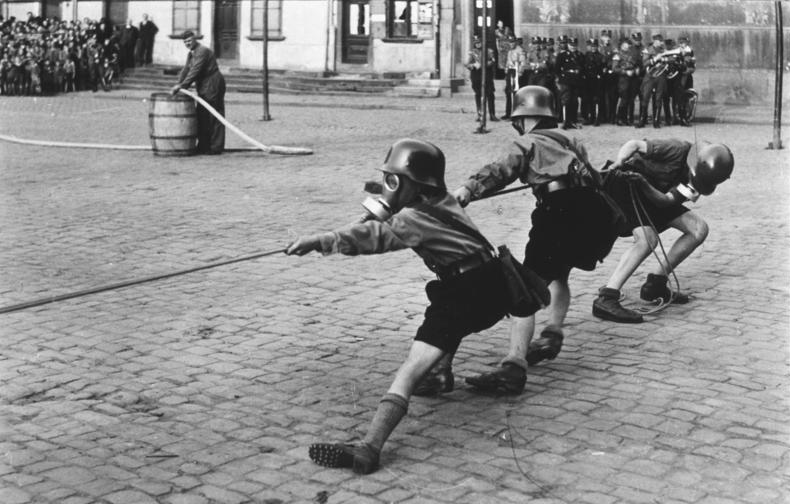
Deutsches Jungvolk recruits of 1933 learn fire fighting techniques.

In spite of its recruits' early age, the Jungvolk had an intensely political role. In 1938, the Nazi leader Adolf Hitler described enrollment from childhood in organisations associated with his party as an important part of indoctrinating young Germans with the regime's worldview:

These boys and girls enter our organizations with their ten years of age, and often for the first time get a little fresh air; after four years of the Young Folk they go on to the Hitler Youth, where we have them for another four years … And even if they are still not complete National Socialists, they go to Labor Service and are smoothed out there for another six, seven months … And whatever class consciousness or social status might still be left … the Wehrmacht will take care of that.

The DJ and HJ copied many of the activities of the various German youth organizations that they replaced. For many boys, the DJ was the only way to participate in sports, camping, and hiking. However, the main purpose of the DJ was the inculcation of boys in the political principles of National Socialism. Members were obliged to attend Nazi Party rallies and parades. On a weekly basis, there was the Heimabende, a Wednesday evening meeting for political, racial, and ideological indoctrination. Boys were encouraged to inform the authorities if their parents' beliefs were contrary to Nazi dogma.

Once Germany was at war, basic pre-military preparation increased; by the end of 1940, DJ members were required to be trained in target shooting with small-bore rifles and to take part in "terrain manoeuvres".

== Organization ==
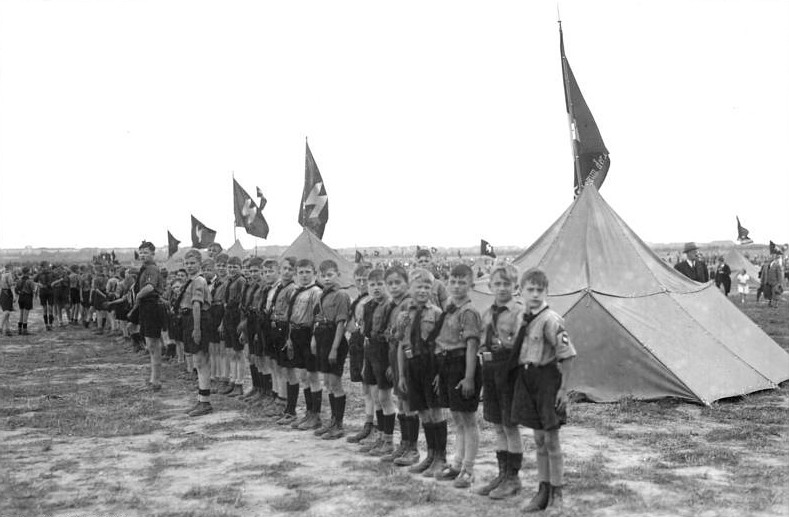
Deutsches Jungvolk recruits line up for roll call at a rally in Berlin, in 1934.

Recruits were called Pimpfe, a colloquial word from Upper German for "boy", "little rascal", "scamp", or "rapscallion" (originally "little fart"). Groups of 10 boys were called a Jungenschaft, with leaders chosen from the older boys; four of these formed a unit called a Jungzug. These units were further grouped into companies and battalions, each with their own leaders, who were usually young adults. Der Pimpf, the Nazi magazine for boys, was particularly aimed at those in the Deutsches Jungvolk, with adventure and propaganda.

Recruits were required to swear a version of the Hitler oath: "In the presence of this blood banner which represents our Führer, I swear to devote all my energies and my strength to the savior of our country, Adolf Hitler. I am willing and ready to give up my life for him, so help me God."

== Uniform and emblems ==
The DJ uniform was very similar to the Hitler Youth equivalent. The summer uniform consisted of a black shorts and tan shirt with pockets, worn with a rolled black neckerchief secured with a woggle, usually tucked under the collar. Headgear originally consisted of a beret, but when this was discarded by the HY in 1934, the DJ adopted a side cap with coloured piping which denoted their unit.

The emblem of the DJ was a white Sieg rune on a black background, which symbolised "victory". This was worn on the uniform in the form of a cloth badge, sewn onto the upper-left sleeve of the shirt.

== Wartime ==
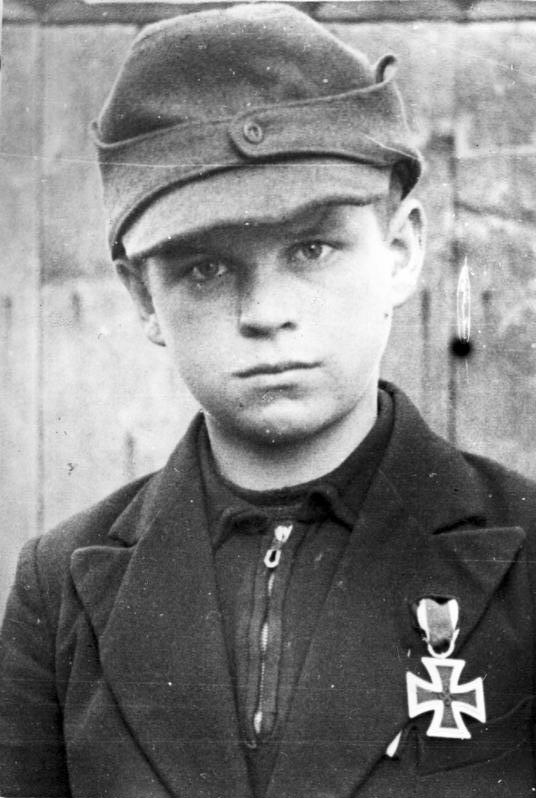
12-year-old Jungvolk platoon commander Alfred Zech (from Goldenau in Upper Silesia) earned the Iron Cross Second Class in 1945 for rescuing wounded soldiers whilst under enemy fire.

In addition to their pre-military training, the DJ contributed to the German war effort by collecting recyclable materials such as paper and scrap metal, and by acting as messengers for the civil defence organisations. By 1944, the Hitler Youth formed part of the Volkssturm, an unpaid, part-time militia, and often formed special HJ companies within Volkssturm battalions. In theory, service in the Volkssturm was limited to boys over 16 years of age, however much younger boys, including Jungvolk members, often volunteered or were coerced into serving in these units; even joining the "Tank Close-Combat Squads", which were expected to attack enemy tanks with hand-held weapons. Eyewitness reports of the Battle of Berlin in April 1945 record instances of young boys fighting in their DJ uniforms, complete with short trousers. Adolf Hitler's last public appearance was on 20 April 1945, when he presented Iron Crosses to defenders of Berlin, including several boys, some as young as twelve years old.

== Disbandment ==
With the surrender of Nazi Germany in 1945, the organization de facto ceased to exist. On 10 October 1945, it was outlawed.

== Cultural depictions ==
The organisation or its members have occasionally featured in fictional works about Nazi Germany and alternative histories where it won the second world war.

In Robert Harris's novel Fatherland, the protagonist's son Pili, a Pimpf, denounces him.

The film Jojo Rabbit (2019), based on Christine Leunens's book Caging Skies, the main character and his friend are members of the Jungvolk.

== See also ==
- National Socialist Schoolchildren's League (NSS)
