= Jutta Rüdiger =

German psychologist (1910–2001)

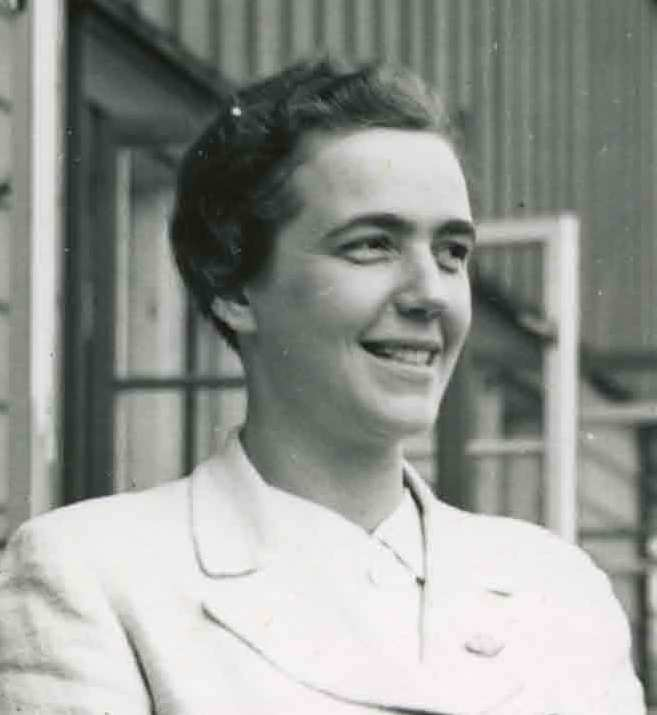
- Rüdiger in 1941

Reichsreferentin des BDM
- In office November 1937 – May 1945
- Preceded by: Trude Mohr
- Succeeded by: Office abolished

Personal details
- Born: 14 June 1910 Berlin, Germany
- Died: 13 March 2001 (aged 90) Bad Reichenhall, Germany
- Party: National Socialist German Workers' Party (NSDAP)
- Education: University of Würzburg
- Profession: Psychologist

Jutta Rüdiger (14 June 1910 – 13 March 2001) was a German psychologist and head of the Nazi Party's female youth organisation, the League of German Girls (German: Bund Deutscher Mädel, BDM), from 1937 to 1945. After World War II, she continued a career in pediatric psychology and maintained a membership of the Association of German Professional Psychologist.

== Early career ==
Rüdiger was born on 14 June 1910 in Berlin but was brought up in Düsseldorf, where her father was an engineer. During economic depression in the interwar era, her father was forced to agree to working for a lower salary, which economically impacted her middle-class family.

After leaving school, Rüdiger trained as a psychologist, thanks to an uncle providing her with an allowance to study. While a student in Würzburg in the 1920s, she became a convinced Nazi and joined the National Socialist German Students' League (German: Nationalsozialistischer Deutscher Studentenbund). From 1933 she worked as an assistant psychologist at the Institute for Occupational Research in Düsseldorf.

Rüdiger became active in the leadership of the League of German Girls (German: Bund Deutscher Mädel, BDM). The BDM had been started in 1930 as a girls' auxiliary to the male-only Hitler Youth, but which grew rapidly after the Nazis came to power in January 1933. She described the connection that she and millions of German people felt towards Hitler and his rise to power around this time:

"the people were really hungry. It was very, very hard. And in that context, Hitler with his statements seemed to be the bringer of salvation. I myself had the feeling that here was a man who did not think about himself and his own advantage, but solely about the good of the German people."

In 1935, Rüdiger became BDM Leader in the Ruhr-Lower Rhine region. In November 1937 she became Leader of the BDM, at which time she joined the Nazi Party. She succeeded Trude Mohr, who had vacated the position on her marriage, as Nazi policy required. Rüdiger was leader until 1945.

== Career in the Reich ==
As BDM Leader, Rüdiger had the title Reichs Deputy of the BDM (Reichsreferentin des BDM). This signified that her position was subordinate to the overall Nazi Youth Leader (German: Reichsjugendführer), Baldur von Schirach (and his successor from 1940, Artur Axmann). This was in accordance with Nazi policy that women and their organisations must always be subordinate to male leadership. Schirach was zealous in preventing the BDM from becoming autonomous, or coming under the control of the National Socialist Women's League (German: Nationalsozialistische Frauenschaft, NSF), whose Leader Gertrud Scholtz-Klink he regarded as a rival.

Membership of the BDM became compulsory for girls between 10 and 18 in 1936, and the law was strengthened in 1939, but membership was never as universal as membership of the Hitler Youth was for boys. The destiny of BDM girls under the Nazi state was to then participate in the Glaube und Schönheit (Faith and Beauty) society, open for ages 17 to 21. They would then become wives to Nazi men to bear many children to increase the strength of the Aryan race.

According to Rüdiger, leader of the League of German Girls in 1937:

"The task of our Girls League is to bring up our girls as torch bearers of the national-socialist world. We need girls who are at harmony between their bodies, souls and spirits. And we need girls who, through healthy bodies and balanced minds, embody the beauty of divine creation. We want to bring up girls who believe in Germany and our leader, and who will pass these beliefs on to their future children."

By 1941, however, there was an acute labour shortage in Germany as some men were conscripted and sent to the front, and the BDM girls were increasingly pressed into compulsory labour service, usually either on farms or in munitions factories, with girls from upper or middle-class families going into office jobs. Rüdiger came to preside over a female work force of several millions, directing them as the economic ministries requested additional labour.

From 1943 onwards, the BDM also supplied thousands of girls for work in flak (anti-aircraft) batteries guarding German cities. By means of this, the Nazi system would allow young women to come to combat service. Girls as young as 13 operated flak batteries, fired guns and shot down Allied planes. Many were killed when their batteries were hit by bombs or machine-gun fire from Allied fighters. Later in the war, BDM girls fought against the advancing Allied armies.

== Arrest and later life ==
Rüdiger was arrested by American forces in 1945, and spent two and a half years in detention. Rüdiger was not charged with any specific offence, and was never brought to trial. Upon her release, she resumed her career as a paediatric psychologist, in the areas of the educational guidance and industrial psychology, in Düsseldorf. She also maintained a membership of the Association of German Professional Psychologists.

According to historian Michael Kater, Rüdiger remained "an unreconstructed Nazi". In a 2000 interview she said: "National Socialism is not repeatable. One can take over only the values which we espoused: comradeship, readiness to support one another, bravery, self-discipline and not least honour and loyalty. Apart from these, each young person must find their way alone."

Rudiger, a lesbian, lived from 1940 to 1991 with Hedy Böhmer. She died in 2001 at Bad Reichenhall, Bavaria, aged 90.

== Publications ==
- Jutta Rüdiger Der Bund Deutscher Mädel: eine Richtigstellung, Lindhorst: Askania, c. 1984 ISBN 3-921730-14-7
  - abridged electronic version
- Der Bund Deutscher Mädel in Dokumenten: Materialsammlung zur Richtigstellung; Hrsg.: Arbeitsgemeinschaft für Jugendforschung GBR, Lindhorst. Zsgest. von Jutta Rüdiger. Lindhorst: Askania ISBN 3-921730-15-5
