= Nippon Fujin =

Political women's magazine in Japan (1942–1945)

- Categories: Political women's magazine
- Frequency: Monthly
- Founder: Dai Nippon Kokubo Fujinkai
- Founded: 1942
- First issue: November 1942
- Final issue: January 1945
- Country: Japan
- Based in: Tokyo
- Language: Japanese

Nippon Fujin (Japanese: 日本婦人, romanized: Nihon fujin, lit. 'Japanese Women') was a Japanese political magazine targeting women. The magazine was one of the best-selling magazines in the Empire of Japan during World War II. It existed between 1942 and 1945.

== History and profile ==
Nippon Fujin was started in 1942 by a women's organization, Dai Nippon Kokubo Fujinkai (Japanese: 大日本国防婦人会, romanized: Dai Nihon kokubō fujin-kai, lit. 'Greater Japan Defense Women's Association'). This association was a patriotic and nationalist women's organization. The first issue appeared in November 1942. The magazine was published on a monthly basis. It contained wartime nationalist propaganda material. German historian Andrea Germer argues that visual propaganda materials included in Nippon Fujin are closely similar to those in NS-Frauen-Warte, a periodical targeting women in Nazi Germany. Nippon Fujin folded in January 1945 after producing twenty-four issues.
