= Nazi feminism =

Far-right political ideology

Nazi feminism is a far-right political ideology that supported equal rights for women while supporting Nazi political and racial ideals. The Nazi Party officially rejected feminism, describing it as unacceptable and "anti-German".

== History ==
In 1933, a group of German women wrote a collection of open letters titled Deutsche Frauen an Adolf Hitler ("German Women to Adolf Hitler"). The letters sought to persuade Hitler to grant German women equal rights and access to positions of power while affirming the Nazi racial ideology. Clifford Kirkpatrick was the first to praise "the spirit of militant feminism rising like a phoenix from the ashes in the very midst of National Socialism". Richard Grunberger commented on the "elements of suffragetism" among women in the Third Reich, citing Deutsche Frauen an Adolf Hitler.

== Criticism ==
Richard L. Johnson criticised Nazi feminism, arguing that feminism was "incompatible" with Nazism. He wrote, "These women rejected or ignored the insights of Friedrich Engels, August Bebel, and Clara Zetkin, who demonstrated a connection between the rise of the bourgeoisie and the subjugation of women."

== See also ==
- Feminazi
- League of German Girls
- National Socialist Women's League
- Women in Nazi Germany
- Women of the Ku Klux Klan
