= NS-Frauen-Warte =

Nazi magazine for women

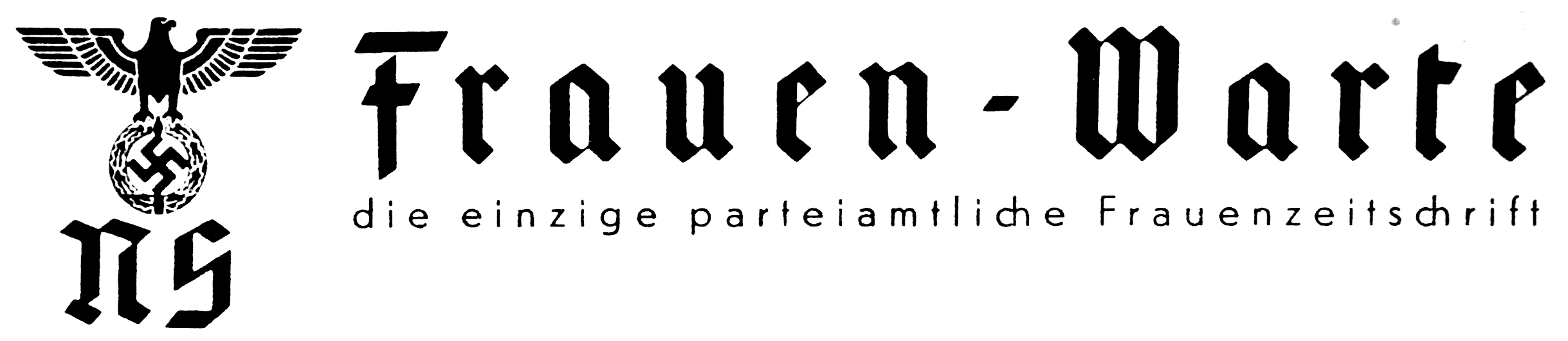
- Categories: Nazi women's magazine
- Frequency: Biweekly
- Publisher: NS-Frauenschaft
- Total circulation: 1.9 million (1939)
- First issue: 1934; 92 years ago
- Final issue: 1945
- Country: Germany

The NS-Frauen-Warte ("National Socialist Women's Monitor") was the Nazi magazine for women. Put out by the NS-Frauenschaft, it had the status of the only party approved magazine for women and served propaganda purposes, particularly supporting the role of housewife and mother as exemplary.

== History and profile ==
NS-Frauen-Warte was first published in 1934. The magazine was published biweekly and had articles on a wide range of topics of interest to women and included sewing patterns.

Its articles included such topics as the role of women in the Nazi state, Germanization efforts in Poland, the education of youth, the importance of play for children, claims that the United Kingdom was responsible for the Second World War, and that Bolshevism would destroy Germany and Europe if the Soviet Union was not defeated. It defended anti-intellectualism, highlighted the achievements of Nazi women and how the system had benefited females, and discussed bridal schools. It also published poetry describing children as a form of immortality. During wartime it urged women to have children, to join in the war effort either in employment or in Frauenschaft from the very beginning, and to greater efforts in total war. Its April 1940 cover showed a peasant woman plowing before a factory, with a soldier's face looming overhead. It depicted accounts of women as nurses during the war, although chiefly as a vehicle for anti-Bolshevist propaganda.

It was predominantly a woman's magazine despite containing propaganda; this contrasts sharply with Das deutsche Mädel, which lay emphasis on the strong and active German woman. The 1939 circulation of the magazine was 1.9 million copies. The magazine ceased publication in 1945. Japanese propaganda title targeting women, Nippon Fujin, had close similarities with the magazine.

The University of Heidelberg digitized the issues between 1941 and 1945 of the magazine.
