= Saxon Greeting =

Nazi gymnastic routine

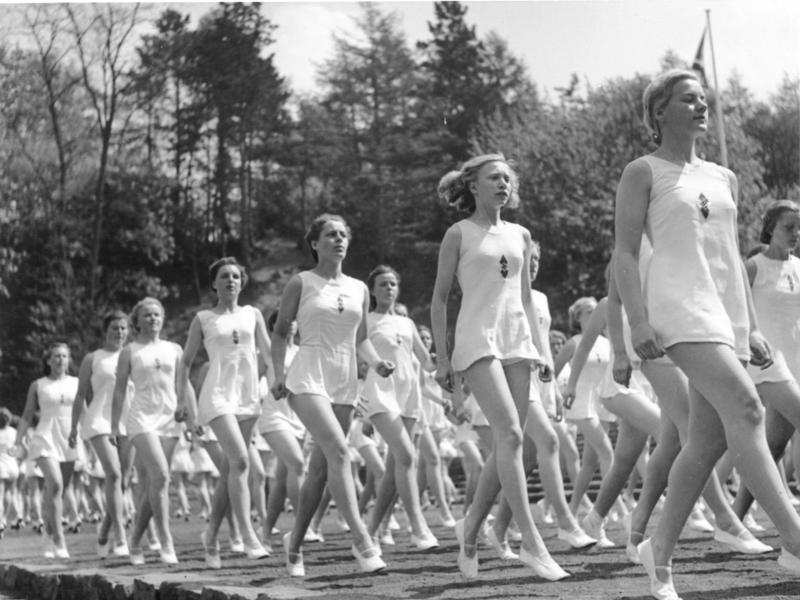
BDM girls parading in 1941

The Saxon Greeting, or Sachsengruss, is a gymnastic routine made famous by the Werk Glaube und Schönheit (Faith and Beauty Society), an organisation set up in Nazi Germany for young women aged between 17 and 21, and part of the Bund Deutscher Mädel (League of German Girls). The routine involved rhythmic dancing and knee bending exercises specifically designed to show off the female physique, and the dancers wore short white gymnastic outfits similar to those of the Women's League of Health and Beauty in the United Kingdom. In the years prior to the Second World War the society often toured outside Germany giving displays in other countries.

The Sachsengruss, or Saroquette, is also a type of rose bred in Germany before the First World War.
