= Guida Diehl =

German teacher, founder of Neulandbund

- Born: 29 July 1868; Odessa, Kherson Governorate, Russian Empire
- Died: 11 September 1961 (aged 93); Laurenburg, West Germany
- Occupation(s): Teacher, writer, speaker of the National Socialist Women's League.

Guida Diehl (29 July 1868 – 11 September 1961) was a German teacher and Nazi party official who was the founder of Neulandbund, a Nazi organisation for women.

In 1912, Diehl worked with Johannes Burckhardt. She was a member of the German Christians and the first speaker of the National Socialist Women's League.

In her 1933 book, The German Woman and National Socialism, Diehl wrote:

Never did Hitler promise to the masses in his rousing speeches any material advantage whatever. On the contrary he pleaded with them to turn aside from every form of advantageseeking and serve the great thought: Honor, Freedom, Fatherland! In his success is shown the power of great divine truths ... For us women it was almost unendurable to see the weakness of manhood in the last decades. Therefore the outbreak of the War was, despite all the hardships, a great experience for us: the upheaval of 1914 was a powerful breaking through of heroic manhood. All the more fearful to us was the breakdown. Then we called to German men: 'We implore you, German Men, among whom we have seen and admired so much heroic courage ... We long to see Men and Heroes who scorn fate ... Call us to every service, even to weapons!

== Publications ==
- Jesus Christ, our Lord (Jesus Christus unser Herr), 1927
- With the Fire and Force of the First Christendom (In Feuer und Kraft der 1. Christenheit), 1928
- I know in whom I believe (Ich weiß an wen ich glaube), 1930
- About renewed Christianity (Vom erneuerten Christsein), 1931
- Salvation from chaotic madness (Erlösung vom Wirrwahn), 1931
- German Christmas in Hardship and Struggle (Deutsche Weihnacht in Not und Kampf), 1932
- The German Woman and National Socialism (Die Deutsche Frau und der National Sozialismus), 1933
- Christ, the Lord of the New Era (Christ, der Herr der neuen Zeit), 1935
- With the Fire and Force of Christ (In Feuer und Kraft Christi) 1936
- Christ, Creator of Renewal (Christus Neuschöpfer), 1939
- Wake up, wake up, you German country (Wach auf, wach auf, du deutsches Land), 1940
- Christians awake! (Christen erwacht!), 1940
- God, the primordial Love (Gott die Urliebe), 1941
- To be a Christian means to be a Fighter. The Leadership of my Life (Christ sein heißt Kämpfer sein. Die Führung meines Lebens), 1959

== Literature ==
- Kürschners Deutscher Literatur-Kalender, 1943, p. 186.
