= Jungmädelbund =

Youth organisation of the Nazi Party for girls

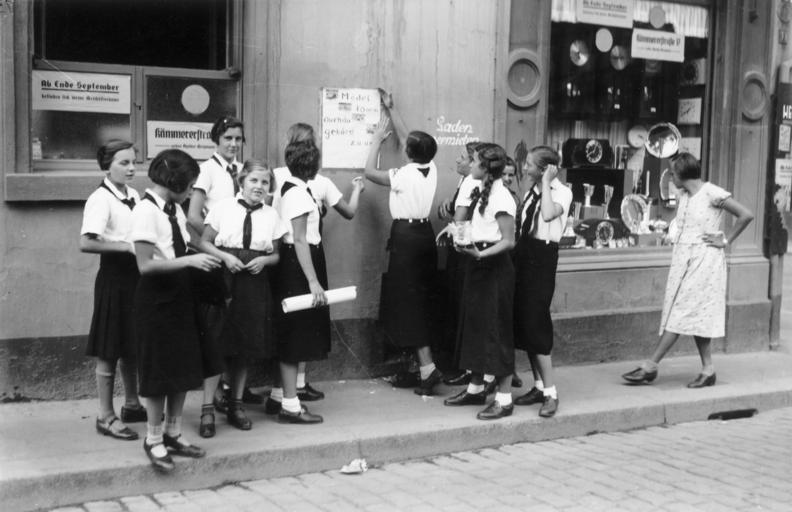
- Abbreviation: JM
- Type: Female youth organization
- Legal status: Defunct, illegal
- Region served: Nazi Germany
- Parent organization: League of German Girls
- Affiliations: Hitler Youth

The Jungmädelbund (German for "Young Girls' League") was the section of the Hitler Youth for girls between the ages of 10 and 14.

It was called the Jungmädelbund in German, and commonly abbreviated in period and contemporary historical writings as JM. Since this was a girls' organization, it fell under the League of German Girls (BDM), which was led by the BDM-Reichsreferentin (National Speaker of the BDM), who reported to the overall head of the Hitler Youth, Baldur von Schirach (who was later succeeded by Artur Axmann).

== Background ==
After the Gleichschaltung in 1933, the League of German Girls became the only girls' organization in the Third Reich. All other groups, including church groups and scouting organizations, were either absorbed into the Hitler Youth or banned. In 1936, the First Hitler Youth Law made membership compulsory for all girls aged 10 or older. The same law also made membership in the male Hitler Youth compulsory for all boys above the age of 10.

== Recruitment and organisation ==
New members had to register for their service between March 1 and March 10 of every year. Registration was held at a local League of German Girls administrative office. Girls had to have completed fourth grade and meet the following requirements:

- Be of racial/ethnic German heritage
- Be a German citizen
- Be free of hereditary diseases

If a girl met those requirements, she was assigned to a on the geographical location she lived at. In order to become an official member, she had to now attend preparatory service which consisted of her participation of one Jungmädel meeting, one sports afternoon which was to include a test of her courage, and a lecture about the tasks of the Jungmädel.

After she fulfilled these requirements, a ceremony was held to introduce new members into the rank of the Jungmädel on 20 April, Hitler's birthday. During the ceremony, new members were sworn in, presented with a membership certificate, and personally welcomed by their group leaders.

In order to become a "full" member, however, each girl had to pass the Jungmädel Challenge (Jungmädelprobe), which consisted of participation in a one-day trip with the group, and a number of sports requirements. Girls had six months to meet all the requirements of the Jungmädel Challenge and, on 2 October each year, those who passed became full members in another ceremony in which they were officially presented with the right to wear the black neckerchief and brown leather knot.

A girl was then a full member of the Jungmädel and remained in the group until the age of 14, at which point she transferred into the League of German Girls (also known as the BDM, or Bund Deutscher Mädel).

== Training and activities ==
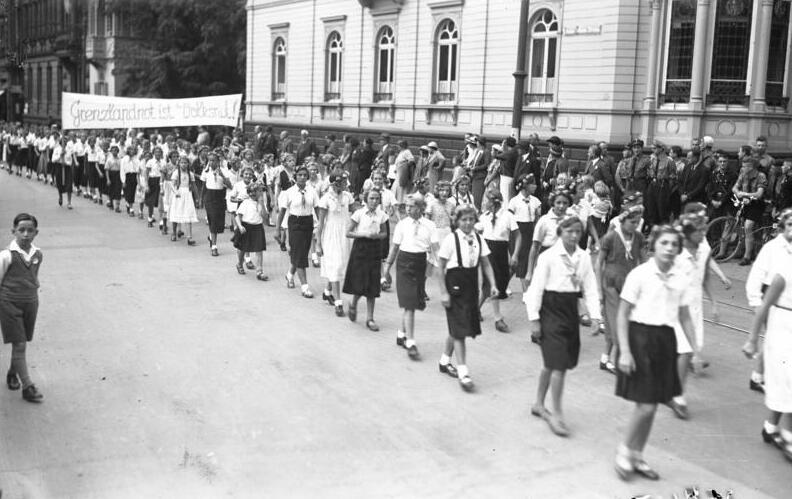
Members of the Jungmadelbund participate in a parade promoting the idea that Germany's borderlands needed protection from foreign cultural influence (1933).

Members took part in athletics and sport along with receiving lessons in home economics. They also took part in charity collections. Along with their practical activities, groups also held weekly evening meetings where explicit instruction in Nazi ideology took place. Contemporary records suggest that ten- to fourteen-year-old girls learned about topics such as German sagas, fairy tales, and epics, famous figures from German history and various individuals and groups involved in the Nazi Party.

During wartime, Das deutsche Mädel urged on the ten-year-olds just joining that "It is as if the Führer had spoken to you, ten-year-old girls as well, who are now joining the community. From this day on, your small strength, too, will contribute to winning the war and building a greater and more beautiful Reich.", and instructed

One thing is expected of you. During your six month probationary period, during which you may not wear the scarf and tie, you must do everything you can to reach your goal. That may be in small things one asks of you, or in your eagerness to prepare for the Young Girl test [a physical fitness test], or during the achievement week during the summer vacation. You will constantly be able to prove your total commitment in service, sport, trips, meetings, war duty, etc. Even in the little things of every day life, be loyal and dependable!

== Sources ==
- Chris Crawford. "Bund Deutscher Maedel: A Historical Research Site". Archived from the original on 2016-03-01.
