= Dai Nippon fujinkai =

Dai Nippon fujinkai (Japanese: 大日本婦人会, romanized: Dai Nihon fujin-kai, lit. 'Greater Japan Women's Association') was a Japanese women's organization, founded in 1942.

== History ==
The organization was founded when three women's associations: the Aikoku Fujinkai (Japanese: 愛国婦人会, romanized: Aikoku fujin-kai, lit. 'Patriotic Women's Association'; 1901–1942), the Dai Nippon Rengo Fujinkai (Japanese: 大日本連合婦人会, romanized: Dai Nihon Rengō fujin-kai, lit. 'Greater Japan United Women's Association'; 1931–1942) and the Dai Nippon Kokubo Fujinkai (Japanese: 大日本国防婦人会, romanized: Dai Nihon kokubō fujin-kai, lit. 'Greater Japan Defense Women's Association'; 1932–1942), were merged on the order of the government to form the Dai Nippon fujinkai in February 1942.

The three predecessor organizations had a similar purpose as the Dai Nippon fujinkai, but while the membership of those had been voluntary, membership in the Dai Nippon fujinkai was obligatory for all adult married women nationwide, and its membership therefore consisted of about 20 million people. The organization mobilized married women, while unmarried women where mobilized by the Women's Volunteer Corps.

The purpose of the organization was to mobilize women in war work: to strengthen the morale of the military; to maintain a frugal lifestyle in order to preserve the nation's resources; to raise production levels; and to support the military. It informed women of the state war policy, organized women in state war campaigns, collected donations, held lectures and participated in war work to free men for military service.

The organization published a magazine, Nippon Fujin (1942–1945).

== See also ==
- Women's Volunteer Corps
