= Korean Women's Volunteer Labour Corps =

1944–1945 forced labor organization

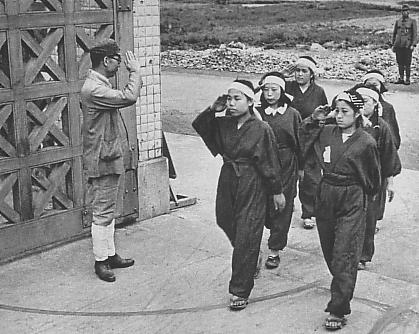
Women's Volunteer Corps (June, 1944)

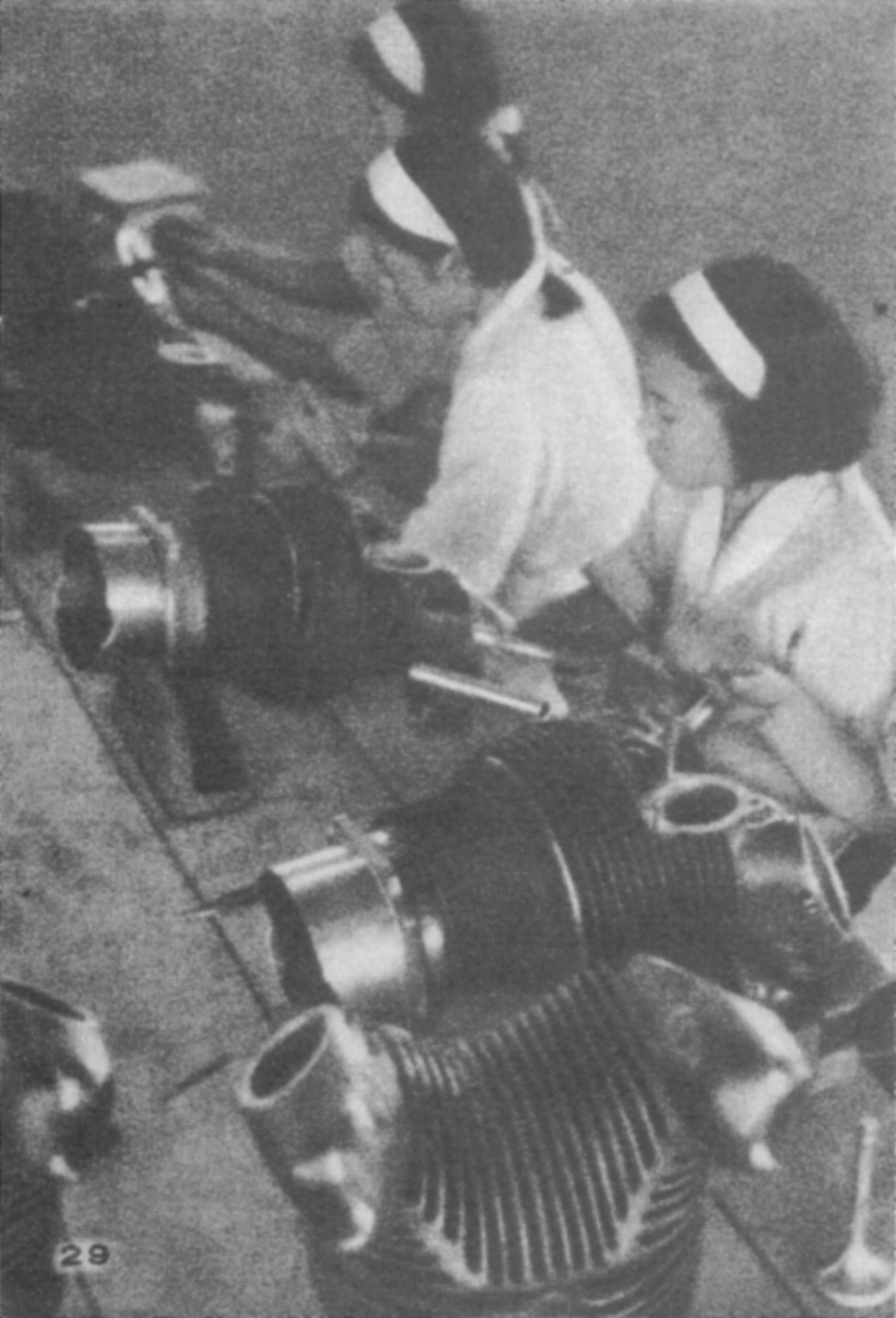
Korean Women's Volunteer Labour Corps, in 51 naval air arsenal, Jinhae-gu

Korean Women's Volunteer Labour Corps (Korean: 조선여자근로정신대; Hanja: 朝鮮女子勤勞挺身隊) or Peninsula Women's Volunteer Corps (반도여자정신대; 半島女子挺身隊) was the Korean part of the Women's Volunteer Corps, which was created in April 1944 as a work group for Japanese and Korean women. Although its official purpose was to give women a chance to serve the Empire of Japan prior to marriage, it was a means to compel women to perform labour duties.

== Overview ==
The original meaning of the term Volunteer Corps is take the initiative to organize for the country. The term was used for the war support groups in many areas. A labour shortage continued throughout the war, and the Volunteer Corps organization was started, followed by the Women's Volunteer Corps organization consisting of female labourers.

It is not clear when the Women's Volunteer Labour Corps started in Korea. Women's shipbuilding began with no legal basis. On 23 August 1944, the legal basis Women's Voluntary Labor Ordinance was carried out and the troops were officially launched. The Act was also applied to colonial Korea and Taiwan.

Korean women without spouses aged from 12 to 40 belonged to the Troops, and they were designated to the munitions factories. There were many mobilization methods including agency of government offices, public recruitment, voluntary support, and propaganda through schools and organizations. 200,000 Japanese and Korean women were mobilized as workers, including 50,000-70,000 Korean people.

== Cases ==
In the spring of 1944, in South Chungcheong Province and South Jeolla Province, girls aged from 12 to 14 were recruited with invitation of school and job, forced to work in the military aircraft factory of Mitsubishi Heavy Industries with no payment. Some of them were introduced by Japanese teachers. The number of girls who worked in the factory is estimated at 400.

It is testified that girls recruited from North Gyeongsang Province elsewhere were forced to work in logistics company, Fujikoshi Steel Industrial Co., Ltd. Toyama plant. They also did not receive proper wages. In 1943, Kim Kum-jin, who was a student of the Seoul Scientific Housekeeping School, heard the school president Hwang Sin-deok deploring that "[t]here are no students who support a labour volunteer corps. It is different from other schools", and she applied to the Corps. Kim Kum-jin worked in Fujikoshi factory making bullets and returned home after the war.

It is also pointed out that they worked in Tokyo Textile Corporation Numazu plant, Mitsubishi Nagoya Aircraft Works Doutoku factory, Nagasaki Shipyard, Sagami Navy Yard, and Yawata Steel Works.

== Difference from comfort women ==
The Korean Women's Volunteer Labour Corps was a mobilization of labour and was different from the comfort women who were forced into sexual slavery for Japanese servicemembers on the battlefield. The term "Volunteer Corps" was often used interchangeably with the term "comfort women" after the war. Because of this misunderstanding, some of the forced labourers denied it, worried that they would be confused with comfort women.

== See also ==
- Anti-Japanese sentiment in Korea
- Mitsubishi
- Nachi-Fujikoshi
