= Women's Volunteer Corps =

1944–1945 work group in Imperial Japan

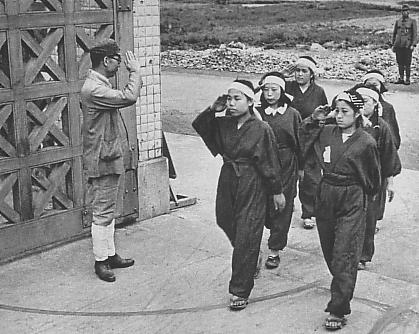
Members of the Women's Volunteer Corps (June, 1944)

The Women's Volunteer Corps (女子挺身隊, Joshi Teishin-tai) was created in April 1944 as a work group for Japanese women. The official purpose was to give women a chance to serve the Empire of Japan prior to marriage, it was a means to compel women to perform war time labour duties. It mobilized unmarried women between the age of 12 to 40, while married women where mobilized by the Dai Nippon fujinkai.

== See also ==
- Korean Women's Volunteer Labour Corps
- Dai Nippon fujinkai
