= League of German Girls =

Girls' wing of the Nazi Party youth movement

- Bund Deutscher Mädel
- Abbreviation: BDM
- Formation: 20 April 1930
- Dissolved: 10 October 1945
- Type: Female youth organization
- Legal status: Defunct, illegal
- Location: Nazi Germany
- Region served: Nazi Germany
- Official language: German
- Leader: Baldur von Schirach; Trude Mohr; Jutta Rüdiger
- Parent organization: Hitler Youth
- Affiliations: Nazi Party

The League of German Girls or the Band of German Maidens (German: Bund Deutscher Mädel, abbreviated as BDM) was the girls' wing of the Nazi Party youth movement, the Hitler Youth. It was the only legal female youth organization in Nazi Germany.

At first, the League consisted of two sections: the Jungmädelbund ("Young Girls' League") for girls aged 10 to 14, and the League proper for girls aged 14 to 18. In 1938, a third section was introduced, the BDM-Werk Glaube und Schönheit ("Faith and Beauty Society"), which was voluntary and open to girls between the ages of 17 and 21.

Due to the compulsory membership of all young women, except for those excluded for racial reasons, the League became the largest female youth organization at the time with over 4.5 million members.

With the surrender of Nazi Germany in 1945, the organization de facto ceased to exist. On 10 October 1945, it was outlawed by the Allied Control Council along with other Nazi Party organizations. Under Section 86 of the German Criminal Code, the Hitler Youth is an "unconstitutional organization" and the distribution or public use of its symbols, except for educational or research purposes, is not permitted.

== History ==
The Bund Deutscher Mädel had its roots in the early 1920s, in the first Mädchenschaften or Mädchengruppen, also known as Schwesternschaften der Hitler-Jugend (Sisterhood of the Hitler Youth). In 1930, the BDM was founded, and in 1931 it became the female branch of the Hitler Youth. The league of German Maidens was derogatorily nicknamed by the counter-cultural Swingjugend "The League of German Mattresses", suggesting sexual promiscuity between the sex-separated groups who claimed to be traditional and conservative. Its full title was Bund Deutscher Mädel in der Hitler-Jugend (League of German Girls in the Hitler Youth). In the final electioneering campaigns of 1932, Hitler inaugurated it with a mass meeting featuring the League; on election eve, the League and Hitler Youth staged "evening of entertainment." It did not attract a mass following until the Nazis came to power in January 1933.

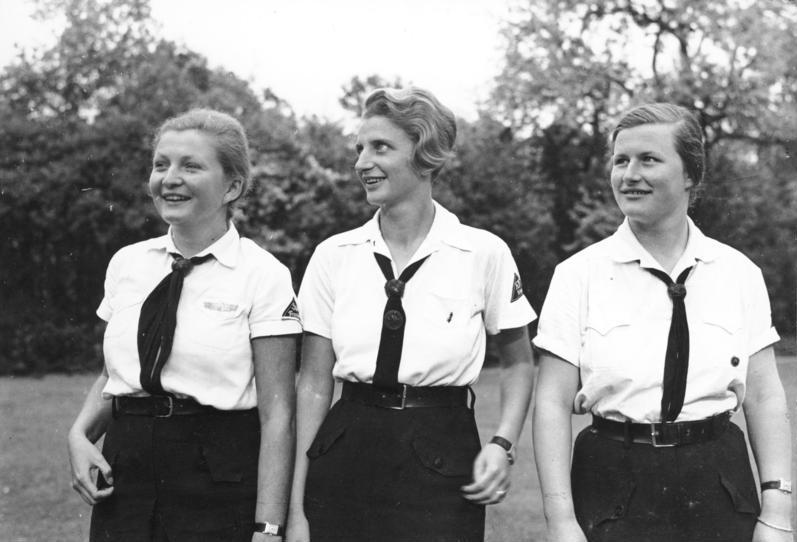
Members of the BDM, 1935

Soon after taking office as Reichsjugendführer on 17 June 1933, Baldur von Schirach issued regulations that suspended or forbade existing youth organizations ('concurrence'). Female youth groups were compulsorily integrated into the BDM, which was declared to be the only legally permitted organization for girls in Germany. Many of the existing organizations closed down to avoid this. These Nazi activities were a part of the Gleichschaltung (Equalization) starting in 1933. The Reichskonkordat between the Catholic Church and Nazi Germany, signed on 20 July 1933, gave a certain shelter to the Catholic youth ministry, but they were the object of much bullying.

The Gesetz über die Hitlerjugend (law concerning the Hitler Youth), dated 1 December 1936, forced all eligible juveniles to be a member of HJ or BDM. They had to be ethnic Germans, German citizens, and free of hereditary diseases. Girls had to be 10 years of age to enter this League.

The BDM was run directly by Schirach until 1934, when Trude Mohr, a former postal worker, was appointed to the position of BDM-Reichsreferentin, or National Speaker of the BDM, reporting directly to Schirach. After Mohr married in 1937, she was required to resign her position (the BDM required members to be unmarried and without children in order to remain in leadership positions), and was succeeded by Jutta Rüdiger, a doctor of psychology from Düsseldorf, who was a more assertive leader than Mohr but nevertheless a close ally of Schirach, and also of his successor from 1940 as HJ leader, Artur Axmann. She joined Schirach in resisting efforts by the head of the NS-Frauenschaft (Nazi Woman's League), Gertrud Scholtz-Klink, to gain control of the BDM. Rüdiger led the BDM until its dissolution in 1945.

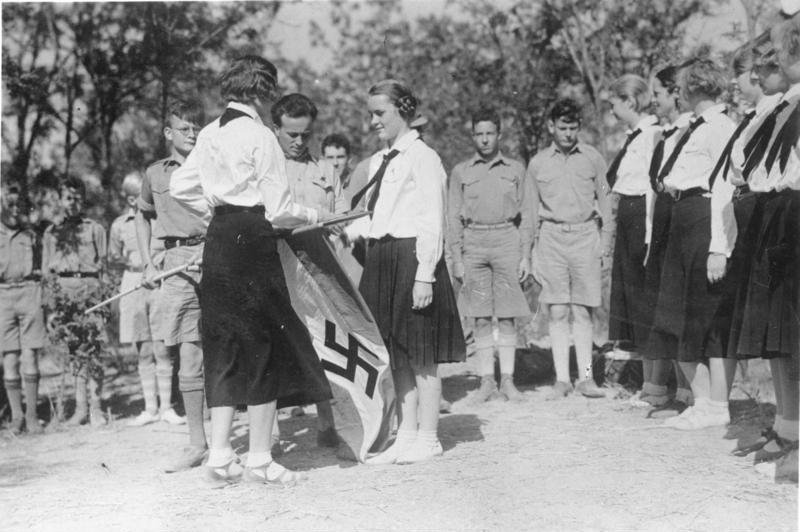
Hitler Youth and BDM in China, 1935

As in the HJ, separate sections of the BDM existed, according to the age of participants. Girls between the ages of 10 and 14 were members of the Young Girls' League (Jungmädelbund, JM), and girls between the ages of 14 and 18 were members of the Bund Deutscher Mädel (BDM) proper. In 1938, a third section was added, known as Faith and Beauty (Glaube und Schönheit), which was voluntary and open to girls between 17 and 21 and was intended to groom them for marriage, domestic life, and future career goals. Ideally, girls were to be married and have children once they were of age, but importance was also placed on job training and education.

At the beginning of World War II, the Reichsarbeitsdienst (National Labour Service; RAD) became compulsory also for young women. It lasted half a year. Many young women became Blitzmädel (Wehrmachthelferin or female armed forces helpers) during World War II.

While these ages are general guidelines, there were some exceptions for members holding higher (salaried) leadership positions, starting at the organizational level of "Untergau". As regards lower (honorary) positions, even members of the JM could apply for them after two years of membership and would then obtain such a position typically at the age of 13. The higher leadership was recruited from members over 18 and was expected to maintain salaried office for no more than 10 years, and to leave the BDM by the age of 30. As a general rule, members had to leave when they were married and especially when they had children.

== Uniform and emblems ==
Traditions-Arm-Dreiecken, regional sleeve badges. Gold is Hitler Youth, silver is Bund Deutscher Mädel.

The BDM uniform was a full blue skirt, middy blouse and very heavy marching shoes. In 1939, a new uniform was introduced for regional and national leaders within the League of German Girls, and along with the new uniforms came new rank insignia for leaders. These new rank insignia took the form of a silver, and for higher ranks, gold bullion embroidered open-winged eagle on a black (white, on the summer tunic) shield with various types of borders to indicate grade. They were worn on the left chest of the tunic.

League of German Girls & Jungmädelbund
League of German Girls & Jungmädelbund	Reichsreferentin	Gebietsmädelführerin	Gauführerin	Untergauführerin	Hauptmädelführerin	Bannmädelführerin	Ringführerin	Hauptgruppenführerin	Gruppenführerin

== Leaders ==
Trude Mohr was appointed the first Reichsreferentin in June 1934. Her main initiative was to nourish a new way of living for the German youth, stating:

Our people need a generation of girls which is healthy in body and mind, sure and decisive, proudly and confidently going forward, one which assumes its place in everyday life with poise and discernment, one free of sentimental and rapturous emotions, and which, for precisely this reason, in sharply defined feminity, would be the comrade of a man, because she does not regard him as some sort of idol but rather as a companion! Such girls will then, by necessity, carry the values of National Socialism into the next generation as the mental bulwark of our people.

In 1937, after marrying Obersturmführer Wolf Bürkner, she became pregnant and resigned her duties.

Jutta Rüdiger (1910–2001) was a special case. She joined the BDM only in 1933, at the age of 23 and after having finished her doctorate in psychology. She obtained honorary positions instantly in 1933 and early 1934, was promoted to her first salaried position (leader of Untergau Ruhr-Lower Rhine) in June 1935 and was appointed Reichsreferentin for the BDM (head of the BDM) in November 1937 (aged 27), succeeding Mohr, who had vacated the position on her marriage, as Nazi policy required. She kept this position even until the German defeat, when she reached the age of 34.

Clementine zu Castell-Rüdenhausen (1912–2008), a countess and member of the higher Franconian aristocracy, was appointed leader of Gau Unterfranken in 1933, at the age of 21, which also seems to have been the age when she joined the BDM, as no earlier date of membership nor any previous lower positions are recorded in her case. She was appointed head of "Faith and Beauty" in January 1938, a few days before her 26th birthday, and was discharged in September 1939 because of her marriage with Wilhelm "Utz" Utermann in October 1939. She was followed by an Austrian member, Annemarie Kaspar (b. 1917), who had been appointed Untergauführerin at the age of 20 in March 1938 and became head of B&B two weeks before her 22nd birthday. She too married and was discharged in May 1941, to be replaced in June 1941 by Martha Middendorf (b. 1914), who was 27 at the time of her appointment and was discharged already in February 1942, as she too had married. From this time on, Jutta Rüdiger, who was a lesbian in lifelong partnership with Hedy Böhmer, a fellow Nazi traveller, and thus uninterested in marriage, took over to lead the BDM directly, thus holding both leadership positions until 1945.

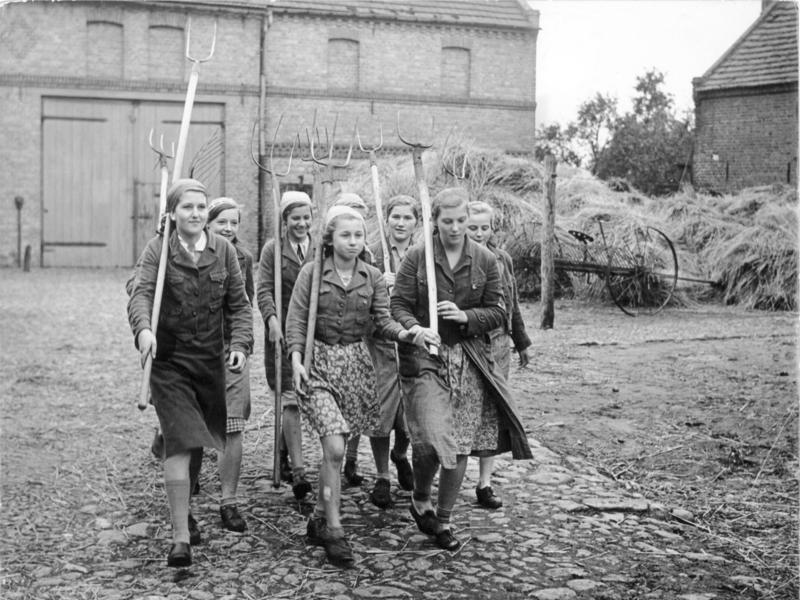
Berlin girls of the BDM, haymaking, 1939

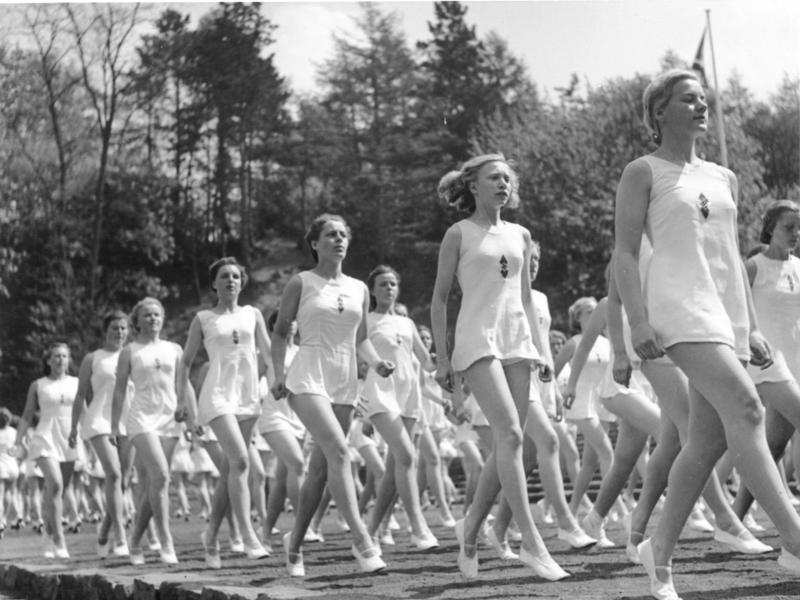
BDM, gymnastics performance, 1941

== Training and activities ==
The BDM used campfire romanticism, summer camps, folklorism, tradition, and sports to indoctrinate girls within the Nazi belief system, and to train them for their roles in German society: wife, mother, and homemaker. Their home evenings revolved around domestic training, but Saturdays involved strenuous outdoor exercise and physical training. The purpose of these activities was to promote good health, which would enable them to serve their people and their country. The "home evenings"—ideally to be conducted in specially built homes—also included world view training, with instruction in history. This instruction would include learning the Horst Wessel song, the Nazi holidays, stories about Hitler Youth martyrs, and facts about their locality and German culture and history. Physical education included track and field sports like running and the long jump, gymnastics (e.g. somersaulting and tightrope walking), route-marching, and swimming. The importance of self-sacrifice for Germany was heavily emphasized; a Jewish woman, reflecting on her longing to join the League of German Girls, concluded that it had been the admiration for self-sacrifice that had drawn her most. Members were also taught the Nazi Party's racial ideas. The League was particularly regarded as instructing girls to avoid Rassenschande or racial defilement, which was treated with particular importance for young females.

Holiday trips offered by HJ and BDM – for example, skiing in winter and tent camps in summer – were affordable; children from poor families got subsidies. These offers were popular.

The League encouraged rebellion against parents. Der Giftpilz presented the propaganda of a German girl being ordered to visit a Jewish doctor by her mother; the girl protested on the grounds of what she had learned at BDM meetings, and while at the office, remembered the warnings in time to escape being molested by the doctor. She then insisted that her mother admit that the BDM had clearly been in the right.

Ilsa McKee noted that the lectures of Hitler Youth and the BDM on the need to produce more children produced several illegitimate children, which neither the mothers nor the possible fathers regarded as problematic. These and other behaviors taught led to parents complaining that their authority was being undermined. In 1944, a group of parents complained to the court that the leaders of the League were openly telling their daughters to have illegitimate children. Public opinion attributed a great deal of sexual laxity to the members. The preparation camps for the 'Landdienst' (land service) of girls and boys often lay adjacent to each other. 900 of the girls participating in the 1936 Reichsparteitag in Nürnberg became pregnant. In 1937, a prohibition came out saying that camping was forbidden to the BDM.

The Jungmädel were only taught, while the BDM was involved in community service, political activities and other activities considered useful at that time.

Before entering any occupation or advanced studies, the girls, like the boys in Hitler Youth, had to complete a year of land service ("Landfrauenjahr"). Although working on a farm was not the only approved form of service, it was a common one; the aim was to bring young people back from the cities, in the hope that they would then stay "on the land" in service of Nazi blood and soil beliefs. Another form of service was as a domestic work in a family with many children.

The 'Faith and Beauty' organizations offered groups where girls could receive further education and training in fields that interested them. Some of the works groups that were available were arts and sculpture, clothing design and sewing, general home economics, and music.

Das Deutsche Mädel was the Nazi magazine directed at these girls.

== Wartime service ==
The outbreak of World War II altered the role of the BDM, though not as radically as it did the role of the boys in the HJ, who were to be fed into the German Wehrmacht (armed forces) when they turned 18. The BDM were told by their leaders during the invasion of Poland that the Poles were a people "worthy of disgust, genuine sub-humans, who deserved to be ruled by a master race." The BDM helped the war effort in many ways. Younger girls collected donations of money, as well as goods such as clothing or old newspapers for the Winter Relief and other Nazi charitable organizations. Many groups, particularly BDM choirs and musical groups, visited wounded soldiers at hospitals or sent care packages to the front. Girls knitted socks, grew gardens, and engaged in similar tasks. In 1943, Das deutsche Mädel urged on the ten-year-olds just joining the Jungmädelbund that "It is as if the Führer had spoken to you ten-year-old girls as well, who are now joining the community. From this day on, your small strength, too, will contribute to winning the war and building a greater and more beautiful Reich."

Girls also helped stage the celebrations after the de facto capitulation of France (see Second Armistice at Compiègne, 22 June 1940).

The older girls volunteered as nurses' aides at hospitals, or to help at train stations where wounded soldiers or refugees needed aid. After 1943, as Allied air attacks on German cities increased, many BDM girls went into paramilitary and military services (Wehrmachtshelferin), where they served as Flak Helpers, signals auxiliaries, searchlight operators, and office staff. Unlike male HJs, BDM girls took little part in the actual fighting or operation of weaponry, although some Flak Helferinnen operated anti-aircraft guns.

Many older girls, with Hitler Youth were sent to Poland as part of the Germanisation efforts. These girls, along with Hitler Youth, were first to oversee the eviction of Poles to make room for new settlers and ensure they did not take much from their homes, as furniture and the like were to be left there for the settlers. Their task were then to educate ethnic Germans, either living in Poland or resettled there from the Baltic states, according to German ways. This included instruction in the German language, as many spoke only Polish or Russian. They also had to organize the younger ones into the League. Because many Hitler Youth leaders were drafted into the military, the task of organizing the boys into Hitler Youth also fell heavily on the League. They were also to provide help on the farm and in the household. As the only contact with German authorities, they were often requested to help with the occupation authorities, and they put on various entertainments such as songfests to encourage the down-spirited new settlers. Some members were sent to the colony of Hegewald for such efforts even when they had to receive gas masks and soldier escorts.

Conversely, the young Polish girls who were selected for "racially valuable traits" and sent to Germany for Germanization were made to join the League as part of the Germanization.

By 1944, the drafting of boys resulted in most of the "land service" help, with the harvest being performed by girls.

In the last days of the war, some BDM girls, just like some boys of the male Hitler Youth (although not nearly as many), joined with the Volkssturm (the last-ditch defense) in Berlin and other cities in fighting the invading Allied armies, especially the Soviets. Officially, this was not sanctioned by the BDM's leadership, which opposed an armed use of its girls, even though some BDM leaders had received training in the use of hand-held weapons (about 200 leaders went on a shooting course which was to be used for self-defense purposes). After the war, Jutta Rüdiger denied that she had approved BDM girls using weapons in her interview with Junge Freiheit:

(...) At the end of the war, Martin Bormann wanted to set up a women's battalion. (...) I replied that I wasn't thinking about it. Women are not suitable to fight with guns in hand. (...) At the very end I (however) only allowed the girls to be trained in pistol shooting so that they could defend themselves in dire need – or even shoot themselves."

Some BDM girls were recruited into the Werwolf groups which were intended to wage guerrilla war in Allied-occupied areas.

== Dissolution ==
The 'Kontrollratsgesetz Nr. 2' (enacted 10 October 1945) by the Allied Control Council forbade the NSDAP and all its sub-organizations, including the BDM. Their properties were confiscated.

== See also ==
- Das Deutsche Mädel
- Saxon Greeting
- Nazi feminism
