= Kurt Gruber =

Nazi politician (1904–1943)

Kurt Gruber (21 October 1904 in Syrau, Vogtland – 24 December 1943 in Dresden) was a Nazi politician and from 1926 to 1931 the first chairman of the Hitler Youth (Hitler-Jugend or HJ).

== Career ==
After the failed Beerhall Putsch in 1923, many groups from the NSDAP Youth League continued to be led under assumed names. In the end, only one such group in Plauen in the Vogtland along with its leader, Gruber, could keep itself running.

Gruber managed to increase the group's membership. In 1926, through Gruber's efforts, a few such groups came together to form what was called the Greater German Youth Movement (Großdeutsche Jugendbewegung or GDJB). This movement, which at first was confined to Saxony, was sheltered by the now – after Adolf Hitler's release from prison in Landsberg am Lech – re-established NSDAP. It was, however, still not a Party youth movement as such.

After a short power struggle with the "Schilljugend", founded by Gerhard Roßbach, Gruber in the end prevailed and his Greater German Youth Movement became the Nazi Party's official youth organization. In July 1926, it was given the new name "Hitler Youth, League of German Worker Youth" ("Hitler-Jugend, Bund deutscher Arbeiterjugend").

Gruber declared, as leader of the Hitler Youth:

Those who today still […] demonstrate as Marxists do so either out of stupidity or habit […] Productive German working youth who have recognized their national [völkisch] and racial strength and are prepared to take to the streets to break the hegemony of the Untermenschen.

In October 1931, Gruber was "promoted sideways" to the NSDAP Reich Leadership (Reichsführung). He was replaced by Theodor Adrian von Renteln, the Reich Leader of the National Socialist Schoolchildren's League (NS-Schülerbund).

Gruber transferred into the NSDAP Reich Party Leadership and the SA's High Leadership. In 1939 he became NSDAP Gauamtsleiter (Gau office leader) for Municipal Politics in the Gau of Saxony. He was moreover the sport leader for the Gau and the publisher of the magazine NS-Gemeinde (National Socialist Community). His highest rank in the SA was Standartenführer.

Gruber died on 24 December 1943 at the age 39 after having suffered a stroke.
