= Pimpfe =

German archaic term for a young boy

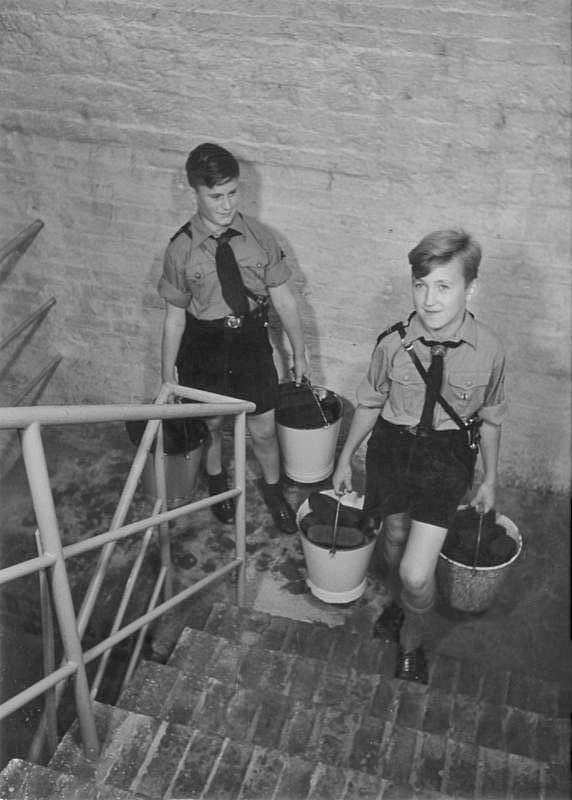
Members of the Deutsche Jungvolk perform community service

Pimpf is a German nickname for a boy before his voice changes. It is a colloquial word from Upper German meaning 'boy', 'little rascal', 'scamp', or 'rapscallion' (originally 'little gas-bubble', as opposed to a Pumpf, the adult variant). It has the same etymology as 'pimp' and 'pimple'.

In Nazi Germany, Pimpf was a term referring to a member of the Deutsches Jungvolk, the junior section of the Hitler Youth in Nazi Germany, for boys ten to fourteen. They were taught to be loyal to Hitler and the regime. Membership in the Hitler Youth was highly encouraged and incentivised during the mid-to-late 1930s and compulsory from 1939.

The term is no longer commonly used.
