= National Socialist Women's League =

Women's wing of the Nazi Party

- Nationalsozialistische Frauenschaft
- Emblem of the NS-Frauenschaft
- Predecessor: German Women's Order (DFO)
- Formation: 1933
- Dissolved: 10 October 1945
- Type: Women's wing
- Legal status: Defunct, Illegal
- Location: Berlin, Nazi Germany
- Members: 2 million (1938)
- Official language: German
- Leader: Gertrud Scholtz-Klink
- Main organ: NS-Frauen-Warte
- Parent organization: Nazi Party

The National Socialist Women's League (German: Nationalsozialistische Frauenschaft, abbreviated NS-Frauenschaft) was the women's wing of the Nazi Party. It was founded in October 1931 as a fusion of several nationalist and Nazi women's associations, such as the German Women's Order (German: Deutscher Frauenorden, DFO) which had been founded in 1926. From then on, women were subordinate to the NSDAP Reich leadership. Guida Diehl was its first speaker (Kulturreferentin).

The Frauenschaft was subordinated to the national party leadership (Reichsleitung); girls and young women were the purview of the League of German Girls (Bund Deutscher Mädel, BDM). From February 1934 to the end of World War II in 1945, the NS-Frauenschaft was led by Reich's Women's Leader (Reichsfrauenführerin) Gertrud Scholtz-Klink (1902–1999). It put out a biweekly magazine, the NS-Frauen-Warte.

Its activities included instruction in the use of German-manufactured products, such as butter and rayon, in place of imported ones, as part of the self-sufficiency program, and classes for brides and schoolgirls. During wartime, it also provided refreshments at train stations, collected scrap metal and other materials, ran cookery and other classes, and allocated the domestic servants conscripted in the east to large families. Propaganda organizations depended on it as the primary spreader of propaganda to women.

The NS-Frauenschaft reached a total membership of two million by 1938, the equivalent of 40% of the total party membership.

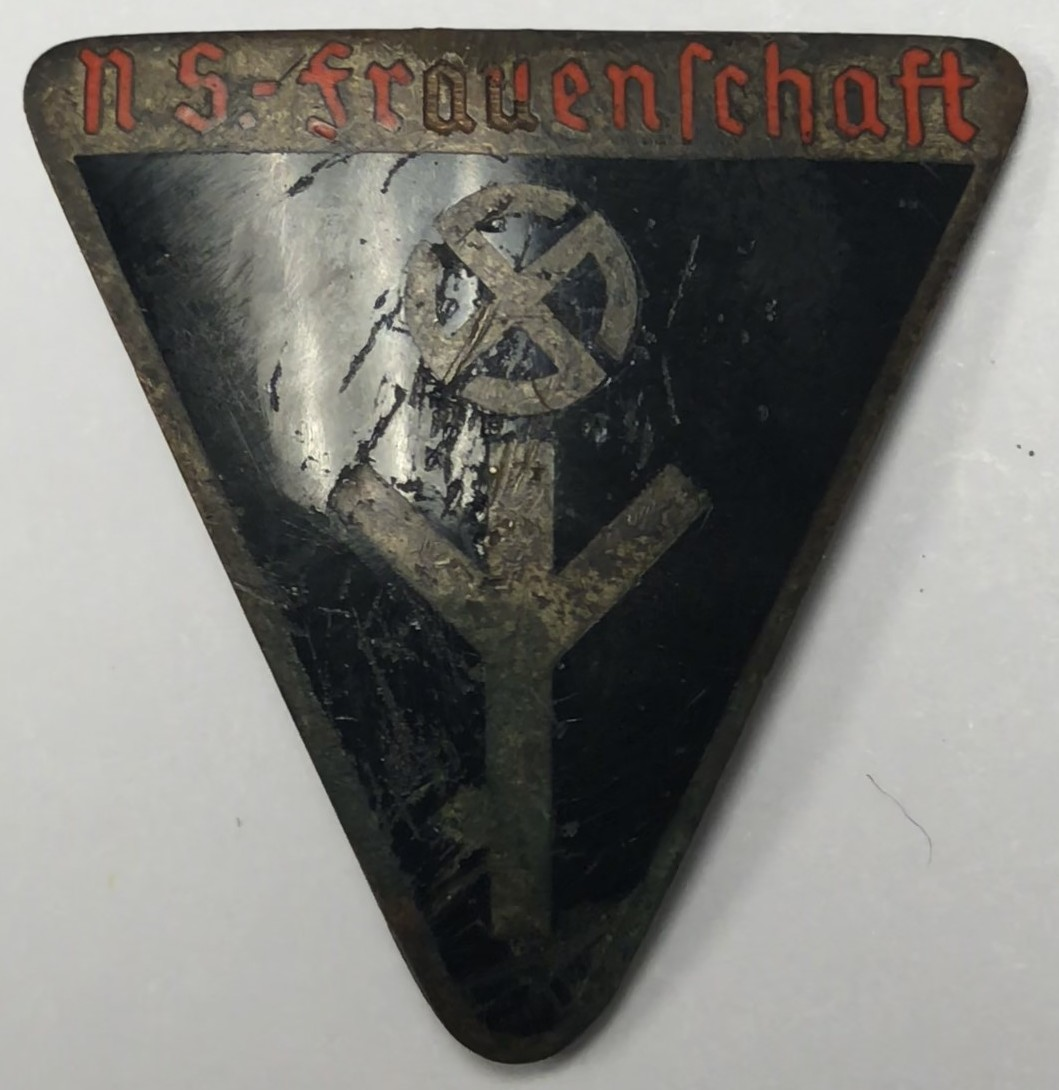
NS Frauenschaft dress pin

== See also ==
- Women in Nazi Germany
- Nazi feminism
