= National Socialist Schoolchildren's League =

- Nationalsozialistischer Schülerbund
- Abbreviation: NSS or NSSB
- Formation: 1929
- Founder: Theodor Adrian von Renteln
- Dissolved: 1933
- Reichsführer: Theodor Adrian von Renteln

The National Socialist Schoolchildren's League (German: Nationalsozialistischer Schülerbund), known under the acronyms NSS and more rarely NSSB, was a Nazi Party organisation for primary school pupils providing a student council and child protection system in Germany from 1929 to 1933.

== History ==
The league began roughly around 1927 as the Hitler Jugend-Schülergruppen. It was established as the Nationalsozialistischer Schülerbund by Theodor Adrian von Renteln in 1929 by unifying the scattered groups under one authority.

In 1929, Von Renteln became the leader of the Hitler Youth, an organisation that he would clearly favour and to which he would give increasingly-wider powers. Von Renteln would stay as leader (Reichsführer) of the NSS until 16 June 1932.

The NSS targeted small children of school age, who went on to become the harbingers of Nazism.

The National Socialist Schoolchildren's League was merged into the Hitler Youth on 20 May 1933. The event was marked with a youth-group celebration.
