= Hitler Youth =

Nazi Party youth wing (1926–1945)

- Hitlerjugend
- Emblem of the Hitler Youth

- Flag of the Hitler Youth
- Abbreviation: HJ
- Named after: Adolf Hitler
- Formation: 4 July 1926
- Dissolved: 10 October 1945
- Type: Youth wing
- Legal status: Defunct, illegal
- Purpose: Indoctrination
- Headquarters: Kaufhaus Jonass, Berlin
- Location: Nazi Germany
- Members: 8 million (1940)
- Official language: German
- Reichsjugendführer: Baldur von Schirach (longest serving); Artur Axmann (Last)
- Deputy leader: Stabsführer
- Parent organization: Nazi Party
- Subsidiaries: Deutsches Jungvolk; League of German Girls
- Formerly called: Hitler Youth, League of German Worker Youth

The Hitler Youth (German: Hitlerjugend [ˈhɪtlɐˌjuːɡn̩t], often abbreviated as HJ, [haːˈjɔt]) was the youth wing of the German Nazi Party. Its origins date back to 1922 and it received the name Hitler-Jugend, Bund deutscher Arbeiterjugend ("Hitler Youth, League of German Worker Youth") in July 1926. From 1936 until 1945, it was the sole official boys' youth organisation in Germany (although the League of German Girls was a wing of it) and it was partially a paramilitary organisation. It was composed of the Hitler Youth proper for male youths aged 14 to 18, and the German Youngsters in the Hitler Youth (Deutsches Jungvolk in der Hitlerjugend or "DJ", also "DJV") for younger boys aged 10 to 13.

With the surrender of Nazi Germany in 1945, the organisation de facto ceased to exist. On 10 October 1945, the Hitler Youth and its subordinate units were outlawed by the Allied Control Council along with other Nazi Party organisations. Under Section 86 of the Criminal Code of the Federal Republic of Germany, the Hitler Youth is an "unconstitutional organisation" and the distribution or public use of its symbols, except for educational or research purposes, is illegal.

== Origins ==
In 1922, the Munich-based Nazi Party (NSDAP) established its official youth wing, the Jugendbund der NSDAP. It was announced on 8 March 1922 in the Völkischer Beobachter, and its inaugural meeting took place on 13 May the same year. Another youth wing was established in 1922 as the Jungsturm Adolf Hitler. Based in Munich, Bavaria, it served to train and recruit future members of the Sturmabteilung (SA), the main paramilitary wing of the Nazi Party at that time.

One reason the Hitler Youth (HJ) developed easily was that regimented organisations, often focused on politics, for young people and particularly adolescent boys were a familiar concept to German society in the Weimar Republic. The German Youth Movement led to numerous youth movements being founded across Germany prior to and especially after World War I. They were created for various purposes. Some were religious and others were ideological, but the more prominent ones were formed for political reasons, like the Young Conservatives and the Young Protestants. Once Hitler came onto the revolutionary scene, the transition from seemingly innocuous youth movements to political entities focused on Hitler was swift.

Following the abortive Beer Hall Putsch (in November 1923), all NDSAP youth wings were ostensibly disbanded, but many elements simply went underground, operating clandestinely in small units under assumed names. In April 1924, the Jugendbund der NSDAP was renamed Grossdeutsche Jugendbewegung (Greater German Youth Movement). On 4 July 1926, the Grossdeutsche Jugendbewegung was officially renamed Hitler Jugend Bund der deutschen Arbeiterjugend (Hitler Youth League of German Worker Youth). This event took place a year after the Nazi Party was reorganised. The architect of the re-organisation was Kurt Gruber, a law student from Plauen in Saxony.

After a short power struggle with a rival organisation—Gerhard Roßbach's Schilljugend—Gruber prevailed and his "Greater German Youth Movement" became the Nazi Party's official youth wing. In July 1926, it was renamed Hitler-Jugend, Bund deutscher Arbeiterjugend ("Hitler Youth, League of German Worker Youth"). The name Hitler-Jugend was taken up on the suggestion of Hans Severus Ziegler. By 1930, the Hitlerjugend (HJ) had enlisted over 25,000 boys aged 14 and upward. (Note: Historian Richard Evans reported an even lower number of only 18,000 members of the HJ in 1930.) They also set up a junior branch, the Deutsches Jungvolk (DJ), for boys aged 10 to 14. Girls from 10 to 18 were given their own parallel organisation, the League of German Girls (BDM). On 30 October 1931, the HJ officially became part of the SA through a decree issue by Hitler, under the notional command of Ernst Röhm.

== Membership ==
In 1923, the youth wing of the Nazi Party had a little over 1,200 members. In 1925, when the Nazi Party was refounded, the membership grew to over 5,000. Five years later, national membership stood at 26,000. By the end of 1932, it was at 107,956. In April 1932, Chancellor Heinrich Brüning banned the Hitler Youth movement in an attempt to stop widespread political violence. However, in June, Brüning's successor as Chancellor, Franz von Papen, lifted the ban as a way of appeasing Hitler, the rapidly ascending political star. A further significant expansion drive started in 1933, after Baldur von Schirach was appointed by Hitler as the first Reichsjugendführer (Reich Youth Leader). All youth wings were brought under Schirach's control.

When the Nazis came to power in 1933, the Hitler Youth's membership increased dramatically to 2,300,000 members by the end of that year. Much of this increase came from the forcible takeover of other youth organisations. The sizeable Evangelische Jugend (Evangelical Youth), a Lutheran youth organisation of 600,000 members, was integrated on 18 February 1934. In December 1936, a law declared the Hitler Youth to be the only legally permitted youth organisation in Germany, and stated that "all of the German youth in the Reich is organised within the Hitler Youth".

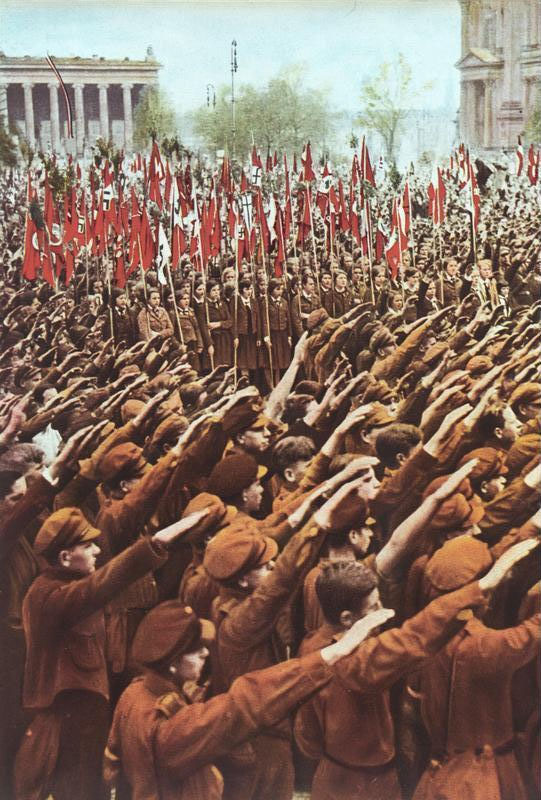
Hitler Youth members give the Nazi salute at a rally at the Lustgarten in Berlin, 1933.

By December 1936, Hitler Youth membership had reached over five million. That same month, membership became mandatory for Aryans under the Gesetz über die Hitlerjugend (Hitler Youth Law). This legal obligation was reaffirmed in March 1939 with the Jugenddienstpflicht (Youth Service Duty), which conscripted all German youths into the Hitler Youth—even if the parents objected. Parents who refused to allow their children to join were subject to investigation by the authorities. From then on, the vast majority of Germany's teenagers belonged to the Hitler Youth. By 1940, it had eight million members.

Even before membership was made mandatory in 1939, German youth faced strong pressure to join. Students who held out were frequently assigned essays with titles such as "Why am I not in the Hitler Youth?" They were also the subject of frequent taunts from teachers and fellow students, and could even be refused their diploma, which made it impossible to be admitted to university. A number of employers refused to offer apprenticeships to anyone who was not a member of the Hitler Youth. By 1936, the Hitler Youth had a monopoly on all youth sports facilities in Germany, effectively locking out non-members. Hitler spoke of the regime's ability to make Nazis out of these German youth, exclaiming in 1938:

These boys and girls enter our organizations with their ten years of age, and often for the first time get a little fresh air; after four years of the Young Folk they go on to the Hitler Youth, where we have them for another four years...And even if they are still not complete National Socialists, they go to Labor Service and are smoothed out there for another six, seven months...And whatever class consciousness or social status might still be left...the Wehrmacht will take care of that.

Over time, a number of boys dropped out due to the regimented nature of the organization. Some of these boys later rejoined after they learned that they could not get a job or enter university without being a member. There were a few members of the Hitler Youth who privately disagreed with Nazi ideologies. For instance, Hans Scholl—the brother of Sophie Scholl and one of the leading figures of the anti-Nazi resistance movement Weiße Rose (White Rose)—was also a member of the Hitler Youth. (Note: This fact is emphasised in the film The White Rose which depicts how Scholl was able to resist Nazi Germany's ideology while being a member of the Nazi Party's youth movement.) (Note: The 1993 Thomas Carter film Swing Kids also focuses on this topic.)

Despite rare instances of disaffection, overall, the Hitler Youth constituted the single most successful of all the mass movements in the Third Reich.

== Organisation ==
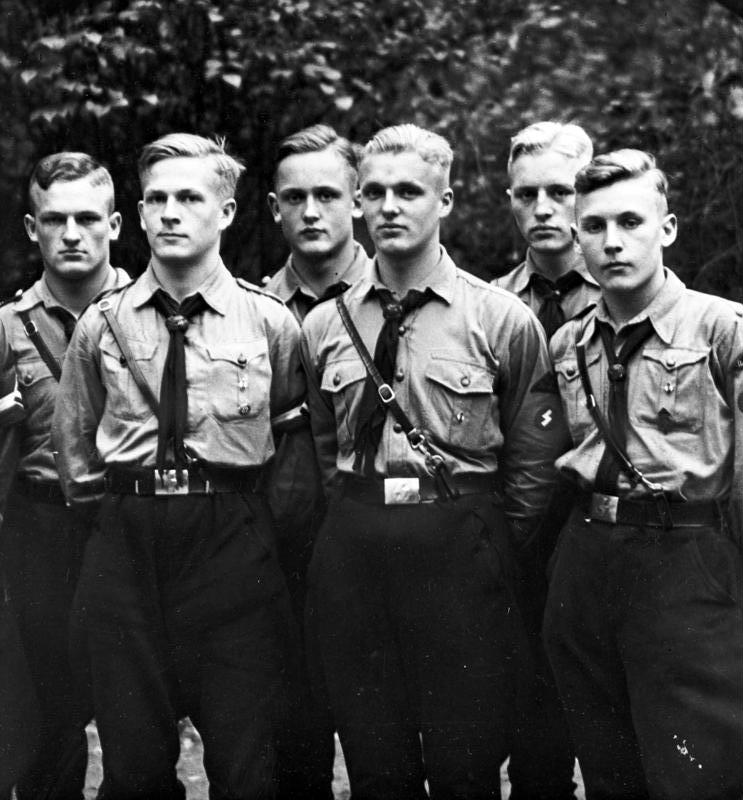
Members of the Hitler Youth chosen by the NSDAP Office of Racial Policy

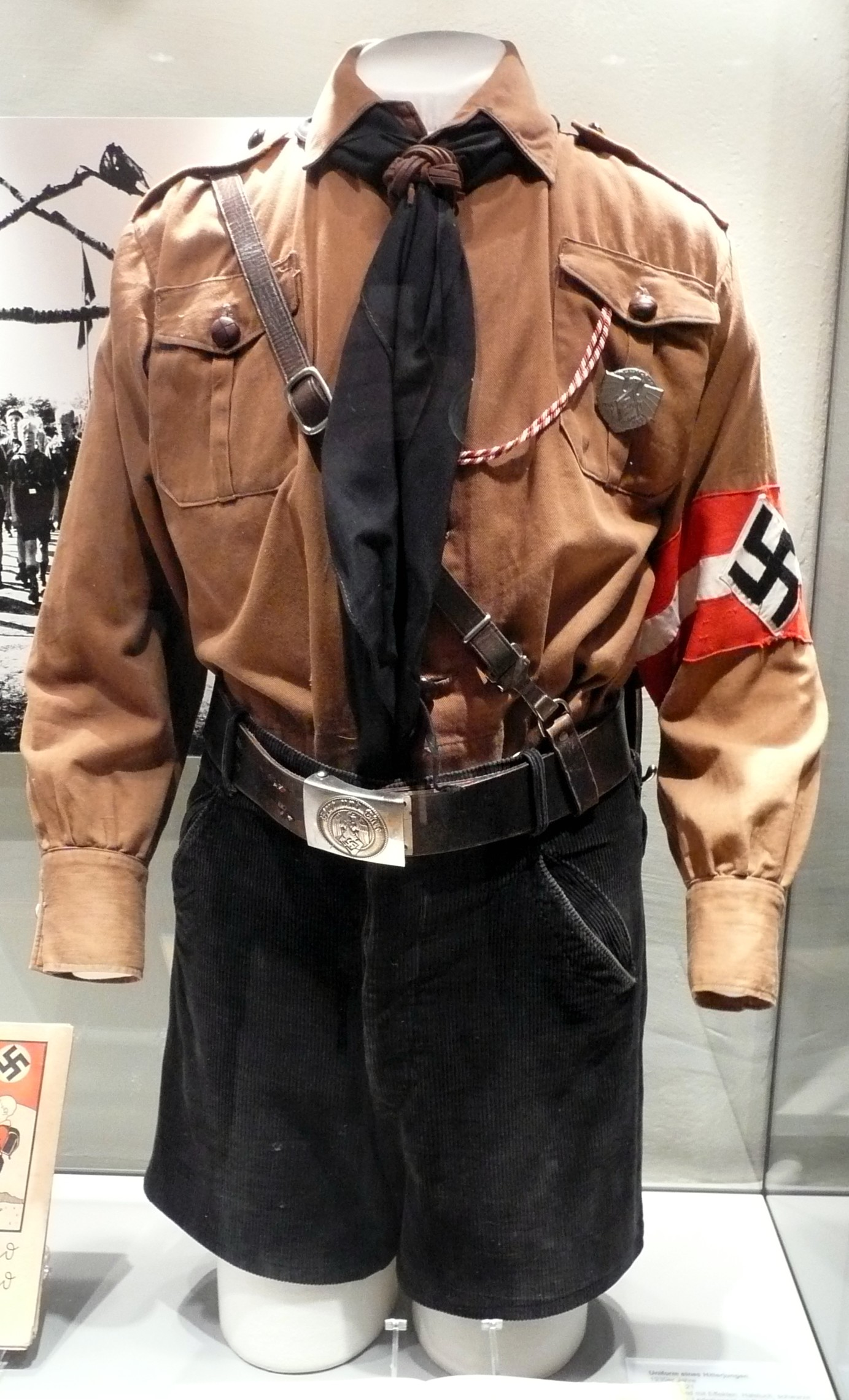
Uniform from the 1930s

The Hitler Youth was organised into corps under adult leaders, and the general membership of the HJ consisted of boys aged 14 to 18. The Hitler Youth was organised into local cells on a community level. Such cells had weekly meetings at which various Nazi doctrines were taught by adult leaders. Regional leaders typically organised rallies and field exercises in which several dozen Hitler Youth cells would participate. The largest gathering usually took place annually at Nuremberg, where members from all over Germany would converge for the annual Nazi Party rally. Since the HJ and BDM were considered fully Aryan organizations by Nazi officials, premarital sex was encouraged in their ranks. (Note: At the 1936 Nuremberg Rally, where there were some 100,000 participants of the HJ and Girls' League present, upwards of 900 girls between fifteen and eighteen years of age returned home pregnant.) This did not conform to the general beliefs of the Nazi Party, which viewed premarital sex as undesirable and a potential public health hazard.

The Hitler Youth maintained training academies comparable to preparatory schools, which were designed to nurture future Nazi Party leaders. The Hitler Youth also maintained several corps designed to develop future officers for the Wehrmacht (Armed Forces). The corps offered specialised foundational training for each of the specific arms for which the member was ultimately destined. The Marine Hitler Youth (Marine-HJ), for example, served as an auxiliary to the Kriegsmarine. Another branch of the Hitler Youth was the Deutsche Arbeiter Jugend – HJ (German Worker Youth – HY). This organisation within the Hitler Youth was a training ground for future labour leaders and technicians. Its symbol was a rising sun with a swastika. A program entitled Landjahr Lager (Country Service Camp) was designed to teach specifically chosen girls of the BDM high moral character standards within a rural educational setting.

The Hitler Youth had a number of monthly and weekly publications: among them were the Hitler-Jugend-Zeitung (Hitler Youth Newspaper), the Sturmjugend (Storm Youth), Junge Front (Young Front), Deutschen Jugendnachrichten (News for German Youth), and Wille und Macht (Will and Power). Other publications included Das Junge Deutschland (Young Germany), Das deutsche Mädel (a paper for girls in the BdM), and Junge Dorfgemeinschaft (Young Villager).

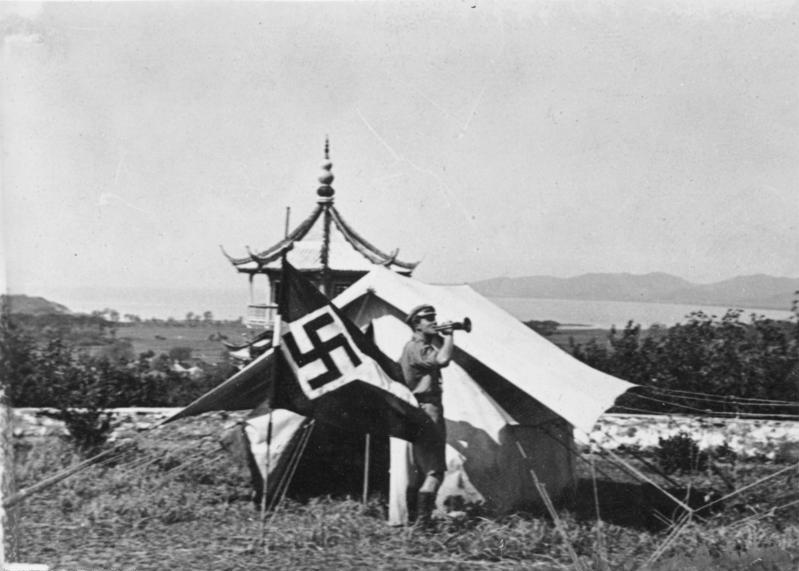
Hitlerjugend camp in China in 1935, with permission of the Government of the Republic of China

== Doctrine ==
The members of the Hitler Youth were viewed as ensuring the future of Nazi Germany and they were indoctrinated in Nazi ideology, including racism. The boys were indoctrinated with the myths of Aryan racial superiority and to view Jews and Slavs as subhumans. Members were taught to associate state-identified enemies such as Jews with Germany's previous defeat in the First World War and societal decline. The Hitler Youth were used to break up church youth groups, spy on religious classes and Bible studies, and interfere with church attendance. Education and training programs for the Hitler Youth were designed to undermine the values of traditional structures of German society. Their training also aimed to remove social and intellectual distinctions between classes, to be replaced and dominated by the political goals of Hitler's totalitarian dictatorship. Sacrifice for the Nazi cause was instilled into their training. As historian Richard Evans observes, "The songs they sang were Nazi songs. The books they read were Nazi books." Former Hitler Youth Franz Jagemann said that the notion "Germany must live" even if the members of the HJ had to die, was "hammered" into them.

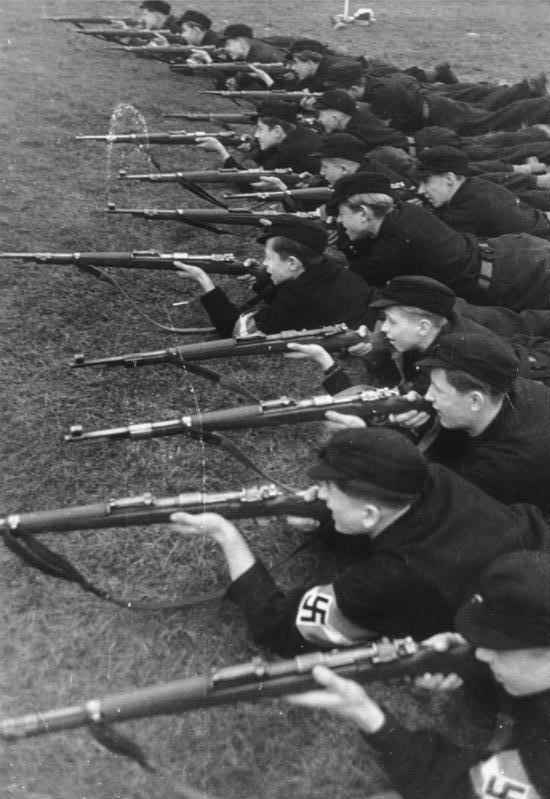
Hitler Youth at rifle practice, c. 1943

The Hitler Youth appropriated many of the activities of the Boy Scout movement (which was banned in 1935), including camping and hiking. However, over time it changed in content and intention. For example, many activities closely resembled military training, with weapons familiarization, assault course circuits, and basic fighting tactics. The aim was to turn the HJ into motivated soldiers. There was greater emphasis on physical ability and military training than on academic study. More than just a way to keep the German nation healthy, sports became a means of indoctrinating and training its youth for combat; this was in keeping with tenets outlined in Hitler's notorious work, Mein Kampf. In a 1936 edition of Foreign Affairs, an article discussing the appropriation of sports by contemporary dictatorial regimes such as Nazi Germany, commented that:

The dictators have discovered sport. This was inevitable. Middle-aged and older persons have their roots in the ground, have affiliations with former régimes. The hope of the dictators, therefore, was to win over youth to the new conception of life, the new system. They found that they could best succeed through sport. From being a simple source of amusement and recreation, it became a means to an end, a weapon in the hands of the All Highest. It became nationalistic. The ideal of sport for sport's sake became an object of ridicule. The real preoccupation of those who directed athletics became the mass production of cannon fodder.

By 1937, there was a HJ rifle school established, partially at the behest of General Erwin Rommel, who toured HJ meetings and lectured on "German soldiering", all the while he pressured Schirach to turn the HJ into a "junior army". (Note: On 17 May 1938, Schirach said, "The real, great educational act for a people lies in ingraining in youth blind obedience, unshakeable loyalty, unconditional comradeship and absolute reliability.") During 1938, some 1.5 million HJ members were trained to shoot rifles. Starting in early 1939, the OKW began supervising HJ shooting activities and military field exercises. Upwards of 51,500 boys had earned their HJ Marksmanship Medal before the year's end.

== World War II ==
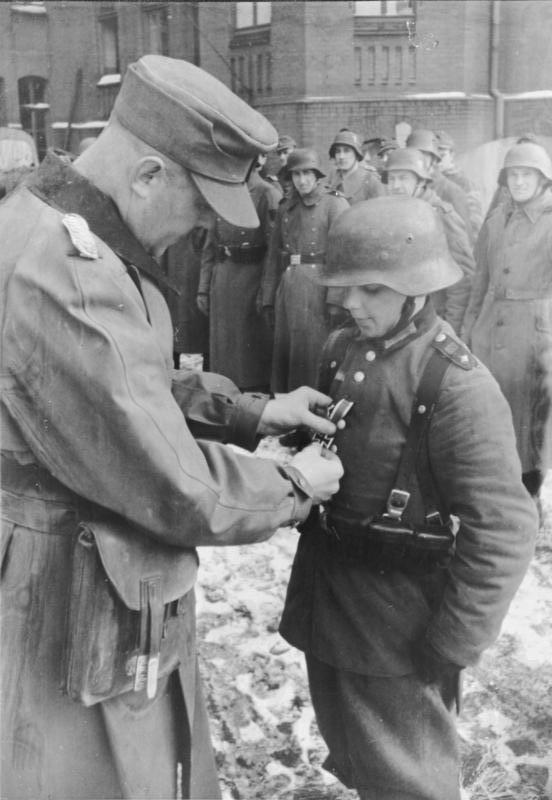
16-year-old Willi Hübner being awarded the Iron Cross in March 1945

On 15 August 1939, a fortnight before the beginning of World War II, Schirach agreed with General Wilhelm Keitel that the entire Hitler Youth leadership must have "defence training".

On 1 May 1940, Artur Axmann was appointed deputy to Schirach, whom he succeeded as Reichsjugendführer of the Hitler Youth on 8 August 1940. Axmann began to reform the group into an auxiliary force which could perform war duties. The Hitler Youth became active in German fire brigades and assisted with recovery efforts to German cities affected by Allied bombing. The Hitler Youth also assisted in such organisations as the Reich postal service, the Reich railway services, and other government offices; members of the HJ also aided the army and served with anti-aircraft defence crews.

In 1942 Hitler decreed the establishment of "Hitler Youth defence training camps", led by Wehrmacht officers. Nazi leaders began turning the Hitler Youth into a military reserve to replace manpower which had been depleted due to tremendous military losses. The idea for a Waffen-SS division made up of Hitler Youth members was first proposed by Axmann to Reichsführer-SS Heinrich Himmler in early 1943. The plan for a combat division made up of Hitler Youth members born in 1926 was passed on to Hitler for his approval. Hitler approved the plan in February and Gottlob Berger was tasked with recruiting. Fritz Witt of SS Division Leibstandarte (LSSAH) was appointed divisional commander.

In 1944, the 12th SS-Panzer-Division Hitlerjugend was deployed during the Battle of Normandy against the British and Canadian forces to the north of Caen. Over 20,000 German youths participated in the attempt to repulse the D-Day invasion; while they knocked out 28 Canadian tanks during their first effort, they ultimately lost 3,000 lives before the Normandy assault was complete. During the following months, the division earned a reputation for ferocity and fanaticism. When Witt was killed by Allied naval gunfire, SS-Brigadeführer Kurt Meyer assumed command and became the divisional commander at age 33. (Note: Meyer was later sentenced to death by a Canadian court after his capture for ordering the HJ to shoot 64 British and Canadian POWs (making them complicit in a war crime).)

As German casualties escalated with the combination of Operation Bagration and the Lvov-Sandomierz Operation in the east, and Operation Cobra in the west, members of the Hitlerjugend were recruited at ever younger ages. By 1945, the Volkssturm was commonly drafting 12-year-old Hitler Youth members into its ranks. During the Battle of Berlin, Axmann's Hitler Youth formed a major part of the last line of German defence, and they were reportedly among the fiercest fighters. Although the city commander, General Helmuth Weidling, ordered Axmann to disband the Hitler Youth combat formations, in the confusion this order was never carried out. The remnants of the youth brigade took heavy casualties from the advancing Russian forces. Only two survived.

In 1945, there were various incidents of Hitler Youth members shooting prisoners, participating in executions, and committing other wartime atrocities.

== Post-World War II ==
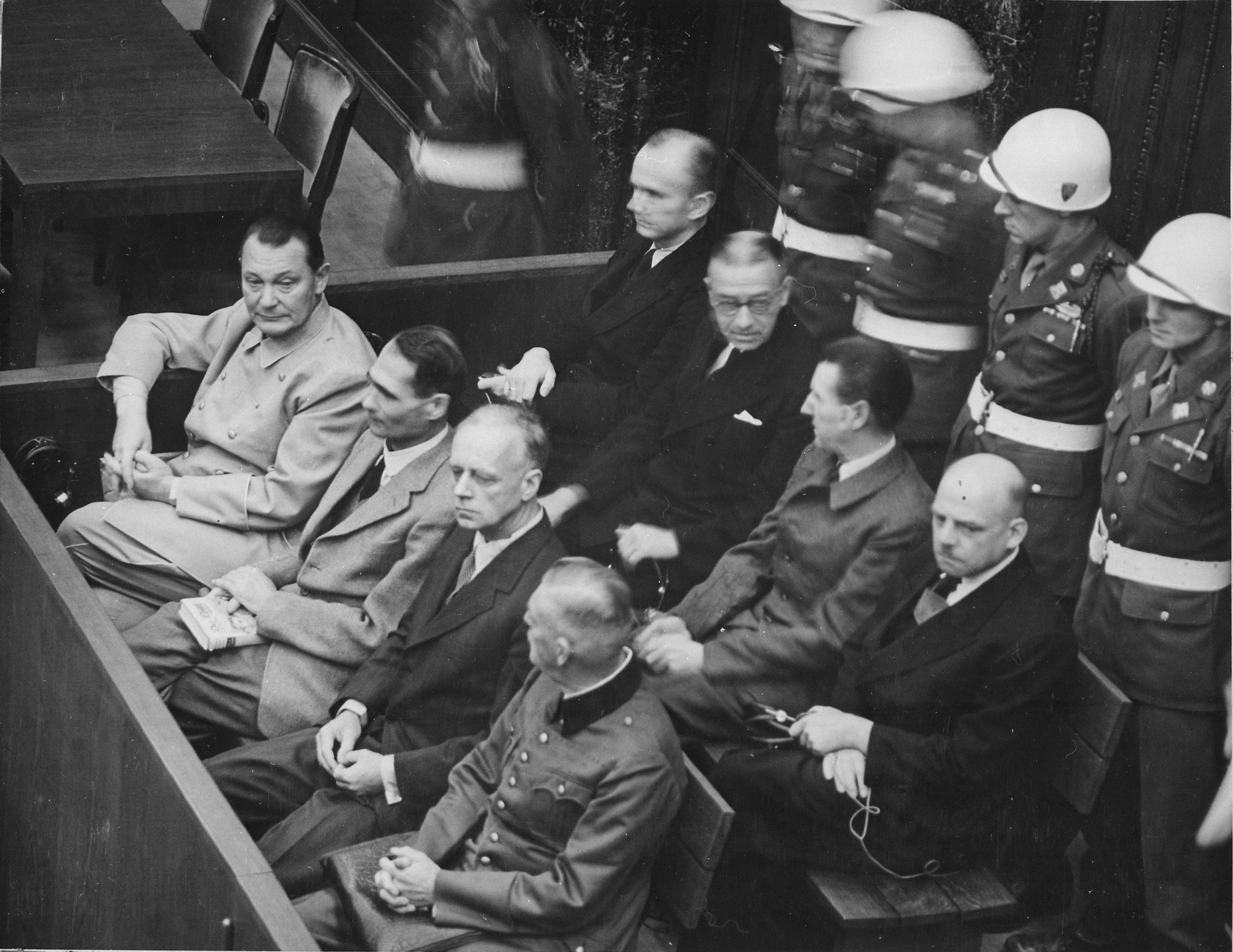
Baldur von Schirach (in second row, second from right) at the Nuremberg Trials seated with other high-ranking Nazis

The Hitler Youth was disbanded by Allied authorities as part of the denazification process. Some Hitler Youth members were suspected of war crimes but, because they were children, no serious efforts were made to prosecute these claims. While the Hitler Youth was never declared a criminal organisation, its adult leadership was considered tainted for corrupting the minds of young Germans. Many adult leaders of the Hitler Youth were put on trial by Allied authorities, and Baldur von Schirach was sentenced to 20 years in prison. However, he was convicted of crimes against humanity for his actions as Gauleiter of Vienna, not for his leadership of the Hitler Youth, because Artur Axmann had been serving as the functioning leader of the Hitler Youth from 1940 onward. Axmann only received a 39-month prison sentence in May 1949, but he was not found guilty of war crimes. Later, in 1958, a West Berlin court fined Axman 35,000 marks (approximately £3,000, or US$8,300), about half the value of his property in Berlin. The court found him guilty of indoctrinating German youth with National Socialism until the end of the war, but concluded that he was not guilty of war crimes.

German children born in the 1920s and 1930s became adults during the Cold War years. Since membership was compulsory after 1936, it was neither surprising nor uncommon that many senior leaders of both West and East Germany had been members of the Hitler Youth. Little effort was made to blacklist political figures who had been members, since many had little choice in the matter. These German post-war leaders were nonetheless once part of an important institutional element of Nazi Germany. Historian Gerhard Rempel opined that Nazi Germany itself was impossible to conceive without the Hitler Youth, as their members constituted the "social, political, and military resiliency of the Third Reich" and were part of "the incubator that maintained the political system by replenishing the ranks of the dominant party and preventing the growth of mass opposition." Rempel also reports that a large percentage of the boys who served in the HJ slowly came to the realization that "they had worked and slaved for a criminal cause", which they carried for a lifetime. Some of them recalled a "loss of freedom" and claimed that their time in the HJ "had robbed them of a normal childhood." Historian Michael Kater relates how many who once served in the HJ were silent until older age when they became grandparents. While they were eventually able to look back at their place in "a dictatorship which oppressed, maimed, and killed millions", he maintains that an honest appraisal should lead them to conclude that their past contributions to the regime had "damaged their own souls."

Once Nazi Germany was defeated by the Allied Powers, the Hitler Youth—like all NSDAP organisations—was officially abolished by the Allied Control Council on 10 October 1945 and later banned by the German Criminal Code. (Note: The Hitler Youth and their related symbology was connoted as unconstitutional in the German Criminal Code (Strafgesetzbuch) (StGB): § 86 StGB: Verbreiten von Propagandamitteln verfassungswidriger Organisationen (Dissemination of Propaganda Material of Unconstitutional Organizations) and by § 86a StGB: Verwenden von Kennzeichen verfassungswidriger Organisationen (Use of Signs of Unconstitutional Organisations). See: http://www.lawww.de/Library/stgb/86.htm or https://www.bundestag.de/blob/195550/4db1151061f691ac9a8be2d9b60210ac/das_strafbare_verwenden_von_kennzeichen_verfassungswidriger_organisationen-data.pdf)

== Ranks and uniforms ==
Decals of the Hitlerjugend used on various helmets

Reichsjugendführer (Reich Youth Leader) was the highest rank of the Hitler Youth and was held by the Nazi Party official in command of the entire organisation. The rank of Reichsjugendführer was only held by two people during its existence, first by Baldur von Schirach and later by Artur Axmann.

Members' summer uniform consisted of black shorts and a tan shirt with pockets, worn with a rolled black neckerchief secured with a woggle, usually tucked under the collar. Headgear originally consisted of a beret, but this was discarded by the HJ in 1934. One flag/symbol used by the HJ was the same as the DJ, a white Sowilo rune on a black background, which symbolised "victory". Another flag used was a red–white–red striped flag with a black swastika in the middle, inside a white shaped diamond. Full members would also receive a knife upon enrollment, with the motto "Blut und Ehre" (Blood and Honour) engraved upon it.

HJ Rank	HJ insignia	Translation	Heer equivalent	British equivalent (Note: These ranks apply only within the Hitler Youth itself and would not be equivalent in real-world military terms. For instance, there were no Hitler Youth leaders negotiating with English field marshals or American general officers for terms of surrender. Hitler Youth members bearing the rank of Reichsjugendführer or any elevated rank within the HJ structure itself would not merit a salute by a German military officer in any circumstance since they were part of a "paramilitary" organization until recruited. Only once the indoctrinated youth entered actual military service would they have an opportunity to prove themselves and earn true military rank. See: https://www.history.com/news/how-the-hitler-youth-turned-a-generation-of-kids-into-nazis)
Reichsjugendführer
Reichsjugendführer		National Youth Leader	Generalfeldmarschall	Field Marshal
Höheres Führerkorps
Stabsführer		Staff Leader	Generaloberst	General
Obergebietsführer		Senior Area Leader	General der Waffengattung	Lieutenant General
Gebietsführer		Area Leader	Generalleutnant	Major General
Hauptbannführer		Head Banner Leader	Generalmajor	Brigadier
Führerkorps
Oberbannführer		Senior Banner Leader	None	None
Bannführer		Banner Leader	Oberst	Colonel
Oberstammführer		Senior Unit Leader	Oberstleutnant	Lieutenant Colonel
Stammführer		Unit Leader	Major	Major
Höhere Führerschaft
Hauptgefolgschaftsführer		Head Cadre Unit Leader	Hauptmann/Rittmeister	Captain
Obergefolgschaftsführer		Senior Cadre Unit Leader	Oberleutnant	Lieutenant
Gefolgschaftsführer		Cadre Unit Leader	Leutnant	Second Lieutenant
Führerschaft
Oberscharführer		Senior Squad Leader	Oberfeldwebel	Sergeant Major
Scharführer		Squad Leader	Feldwebel	Staff Sergeant
Oberkameradschaftsführer		Senior Comrade Unit Leader	Unterfeldwebel	Sergeant
Kameradschaftsführer		Comrade Unit Leader	Unteroffizier	Corporal
Oberrottenführer		Senior Section Leader	Obergefreiter	Lance Corporal
Rottenführer		Section Leader	Gefreiter	None
Hitlerjungen
Hitlerjunge		Hitler Youth	Soldat	Private
Source: (Note: To verify these ranks, see the Nazi publication: Reichsorganisationsleiter der NSDAP (1943). Organisationshandbuch der NSDAP. München: Zentralverlag der NSDAP, Franz Eher Nachf., Tafels 55, 56, and p. 458.)

Troop colours/Paspel: (Note: See: Reichsorganisationsleiter der NSDAP (1943), pp. 460–462.)

(Most Hitler Youth shoulder boards were tan or black and piped with one of the below “troop colours” or Paspel; The naval Hitler Youth units were the exception, with navy blue shoulder boards piped in gold)

- Red (rot); Standard Hitler Youth (Allgemeine-HJ) colours
  - Hitler Youth mountain walk groups (HJ-Bergfahrtengruppen) and Mountain Hitler Youth (Gebirgs-HJ) were programs available to HJ members. They were not Sonderformation and did not bear unique Paspel, though participants were eligible to earn certain insignia, such as the HJ-Skiführerabzeichen (Hitler Youth Ski Leader’s Badge), among others
- Carmine (karmesinrot); Area and Reichsjugendführer staffs
- Light blue (hellblau): 'Flyer' (or 'Pilot') Hitler Youth (Flieger-HJ)
- Pink (rosa): Motor Hitler Youth (Motor-HJ)
- Yellow (gelb): Communications/Signal Hitler Youth (Nachrichten-HJ)
  - Red (rot): Pioneer (or Engineering) Hitler Youth (Pionier-HJ); Amalgamated into the Nachrichten-HJ in 1936, adopted yellow (gelb) piping
- Green (grün): Hitler Youth agriculture service (HJ-Landdienst)
- White (weiß); National Political Institutes of Education (Nationalpolitische Erziehungsanstalten or NPEA) educational institutions; NPEA schools were NSDAP-sponsored preparatory schools which were paramilitary in nature. NPEA personnel utilized HJ uniforms and ranks
- White (weiß); Hitler Youth 'patrol service' (HJ-Streifendienst or SRD); White Paspel was authorized in June 1942 for SRD personnel. Prior to this, SRD personnel wore the standard red of the Allgemeine-HJ
  - Red (rot); Hitler Youth Firefighting Brigades (HJ-Feuerwehrscharen, also referred to as Feuerwehrscharen im SRD); Feuerwehrscharen units existed prior to 1939, but their training was not standardized. In December 1939, training was standardized and all Feuerwehrscharen personnel were fully subordinated to the HJ-Streifendienst (SRD); In 1940, uniforms unique to the HJ-Feuerwehrscharen were introduced, bearing shoulder boards piped with Carmine (karmesinrot) Paspel. After the June 1942 transition of the SRD to white Paspel, Feuerwehrscharen were also authorized to wear the SRD white (weiß der SRD) shoulder board piping on their standard HJ uniforms. Feuerwehrscharen personnel were also eligible to earn the HJ-Feuerwehrabzeichen ("Hitler Youth Fire Brigade Badge), issued in two degrees; Formationsabzeichen (standard badge), edged in carmine, and the Führerabzeichen (fire unit leaders’ badge), edged in white or silver. Apart from the edging, the badges were identical; a diamond-shaped cloth insignia worn on the lower-left outer sleeve of appropriate HJ uniforms, featuring a carmine Polizeiadler ("police eagle" insignia) superimposed on red and black flames. The badges were earned via a standardized pass-or-fail series of firefighting-related tests
- Navy blue (marineblau) base piped in gold (gold): Naval Hitler Youth (Marine-HJ)
- Red (rot); Mounted Hitler Youth (Reiter-HJ); Disbanded in 1936
- Red (rot); Hitler Youth First-Aiders; (HJ-Feldschere)
- League of German Girls (Bund Deutscher Mädel or BDM)-Health Service Girl (BDM-Gesundheitsdienstmädel); BDM personnel did not wear shoulder boards, and thus Health Service Girls had no unique colours. Qualified BDM-Gesundheitsdienstmädel wore a Feldscher insignia of black and silver Aesculapius snake-and-staff on their lower-left sleeve. Post-September 1938 this insignia was changed to a white background with a red "life rune” with varied borders denoting rank

== See also ==
- Great Japan Youth Party – Japanese Fascist youth movement
- Hitler Youth Badge
- Hitlerjunge Quex – 1933 propaganda film about the Hitler Youth
- Jojo Rabbit – satire film about Hitler Youth
- Nationale Jeugdstorm – Dutch Fascist youth movement
- National Socialist German Students' League
- National Socialist Schoolchildren's League
- Opera Nazionale Balilla – Italian Fascist youth movement
- "Vorwärts! Vorwärts!" – Anthem of Hitler Youth
