= Velikonja =

Velikonja is a Slovene surname. Notable people with the surname include:

- Etien Velikonja (born 1988), Slovene soccer player
- Joseph Velikonja (1923–2015), Slovene-American geographer
- Mitja Velikonja (born 1965), Slovene cultural studies academic
- Narte Velikonja (1891–1945), Slovene writer and cultural figure
