= Narte Velikonja =

Slovene writer

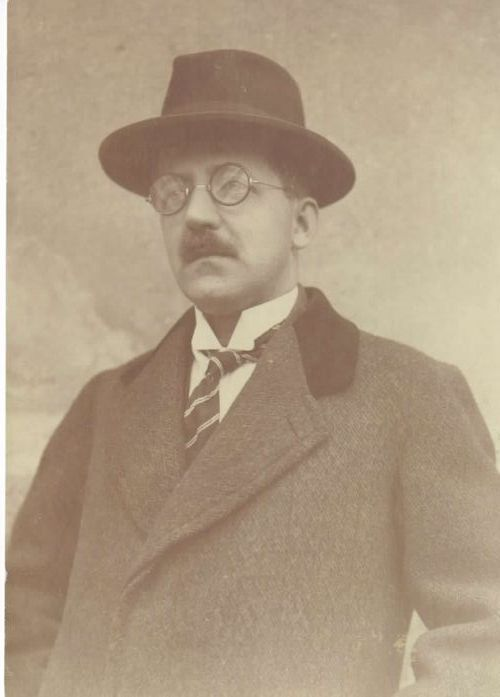
- Velikonja in the 1930s
- Born: Lenart Velikonja; June 8, 1891
- Died: June 25, 1945 (aged 54)

Lenart "Narte" Velikonja (June 8, 1891 – June 25, 1945) was a Slovene writer and cultural figure.

== Life ==
Narte Velikonja was born in Predmeja, the son of Ignatius Velikonja and Maria (née Beuk) Velikonja, and he was baptized Leonardus Velikonja at the parish church in Otlica. As a child, Velikonja initially considered joining the priesthood, but later decided to study law. He attended law school in Vienna, served for some time in the military, and graduated in 1918. He married a niece of Anton Bonaventura Jeglič, who was bishop of Ljubljana at the time. Together they had 13 children, ten of whom survived childhood. He performed various work for the provincial government in Ljubljana. During the Second World War he was active in the Winter Relief charity organization, and he was also the main driving force behind and one of the editors of the publication Zbornik Zimske pomoči (Winter Relief Collection). He firmly opposed the communist violence committed during the war, in which capacity he collaborated closely with Leon Rupnik and produced propaganda against the Liberation Front, including the brochure Malikovanje zločina (Idolatry of Crime, 1944). He was arrested by the communist secret police (OZNA) on May 10, 1945 and charged with collaborating with the Axis forces. He was condemned to death at a show trial on June 23, 1945 that included ten other defendants and was shot two days later. The head of the secret police, Mitja Ribičič, characterized Velikonja and his fellow accused as "unrepentant Germanizers and Hitlerites" in the hasty trial, which had an unclear legal basis and was orchestrated by the OZNA. The authorities forbade public access to his literary work and it is not known where his body was disposed of. Velikonja and his works have been written about in the Slovene emigre community. His son was the geographer Joseph Velikonja.

Velikonja's conviction was overturned by Slovenia's supreme court in 2015, which ruled that any activity he was engaged in was not illegal at the time, and that the charges against him were vague in terms of not only time and place, but also the allegations themselves.

== Work ==
Narte Velikonja started his literary career as a poet, and he later developed as a prose writer in the style of modern realism. He published his first prose in 1910. His works, primarily novellas, primarily drew on material from his native area around the Trnovo Forest Plateau. He depicted farm owners, tenant farmers, and manual laborers in their struggle to make a living under difficult economic and political circumstances, addressed the essential features of rural life, and focused on individuals' psychological experiences. He described the conditions under the Italian authorities in his story "V Smrlinju" (In the Juniper Bush; published in the journal Mladika in 1921). He published his early novellas in the collections Sirote (Orphans) and Otroci (Children). His story "Višarska polena" (Logs from Lussari) especially won acclaim; it was published in the Hermagoras Society's series Slovenske večernice (Slovenian Vespers), even though it went significantly beyond the traditional framework of the genre. His most important works include the story "Besede" (Words), which presents rural life in Slovenia. His book Naš pes (Our Dog) is a collection of happy stories from his childhood. During his later period he wrote novella about people suffering from illness, partially from his own experience. His humorous stories are collected in the volumes Pod drobnogledom (Under the Microscope) and Zbiralna leča (The Convex Lens). He wrote some folk plays for the theater, including Suženj (The Slave; published in Dom in svet in 1916) and Tabor (The Camp; published in Mladika in 1940).

== Bibliography ==
=== Prose ===
- Albanska špijonka, story, written under the pseudonym Ovca (together with Izidor Cankar), 1917.
- Višarska polena, story
- Sirote, novellas
- Otroci, novellas
- Naš pes, reminiscences of his youth
- Besede, story
- Pod drobnogledom, humorous stories
- Zbiralna leča, humorous stories
- 3 x 88 anekdot, Ljubljana: J. Žužek, 1943.
- 888/3 anekdot
- Malikovanje zločina
- Ljudje, selection of short stories
- Zanke, selection of short stories
- Ljudje in zanke
- Humoreske in satire

=== Plays ===
- Suženj, (DiS, 1916).
- Tabor, (Mladika, 1940).
- Župan, manuscript
- Njiva, manuscript

== Works about Velikonja ==
- Tine Debeljak, Spomin na Narteja Velikonjo
- Ana Koblar-Horetzky, Narte Velikonja in France Koblar
- Helga Glušič, Pripovedi Narteja Velikonje
- Alenka Puhar, Narte Velikonja - Prostor za moža iz zanke
- Boris Mlakar, Tragično srečanje z revolucijo: primer Narteja Velikonje
