= Volksgemeinschaft =

German expression referring to the unity of a people, folk, nation or race

Volksgemeinschaft (German pronunciation: [ˈfɔlksɡəˌmaɪnʃaft]) is a German expression meaning "people's community", "folk community", "national community", or "racial community", depending on the translation of its component term Volk (cognate with the English word "folk"). This expression originally became popular during World War I as Germans rallied in support of the war, and many experienced "relief that at one fell swoop all social and political divisions could be solved in the great national equation". The idea of a Volksgemeinschaft was rooted in the notion of uniting people across class divides to achieve a national purpose, and the hope that national unity would "obliterate all conflicts - between employers and employees, town and countryside, producers and consumers, industry and craft".

After the November Revolution of 1918, the overthrow of the constitutional monarchy, and Germany's defeat in World War I, the concept of Volksgemeinschaft remained popular, especially on the right wing of German politics, in opposition to the class struggle advocated by Marxist parties like the Social Democrats and the Communists. The monarchist German Conservative Party (DkP) became the German National People's Party (DNVP) and the National Liberal Party (NLP) reorganized itself into the German People's Party (DVP), with the new names intended partly as references to Volksgemeinschaft.

The concept was embraced by the newly founded Nazi Party in the 1920s, and eventually became strongly associated with Nazism after Adolf Hitler's rise to power. In the Nazi vision of Volksgemeinschaft, society would continue to be organized into classes (based upon talent, property, or profession), but there would be no class conflict, because a common national consciousness would inspire the different economic and social classes to live together harmoniously and work for the nation. There was also an important racial aspect to the Nazi Volksgemeinschaft: only "people of Aryan blood" could be members.

== Development ==
The word "Volksgemeinschaft" was probably first used in Gottlob August Tittel's 1791 translation of a text written by John Locke, synthesising the expression "in any [particular] place, generally". Among 19th century scholars who used the word "Volksgemeinschaft" were Friedrich Schleiermacher, Friedrich Carl von Savigny, Carl Theodor Welcker, Johann Caspar Bluntschli, Hermann Schulze, Wilhelm Dilthey, and Wilhelm Wundt. Most influential was perhaps Ferdinand Tönnies' theory in his work Gemeinschaft und Gesellschaft ("Community and Society") of 1887. Decades later, in 1932, Tönnies joined the Social Democratic Party of Germany to oppose the rise of Nazism and protest against their use of his concept. He had his honorary professorship removed when Adolf Hitler came to power.

In 1914, at the beginning of World War I, the German Emperor Wilhelm II proclaimed before the Reichstag the Burgfrieden ("peace in the castle" or "truce in the castle", a kind of "unity within a besieged castle" for the duration of the conflict), announcing that henceforward all of the regional differences between the different states of the Reich; between rich, middle class and poor; between Roman Catholics and Protestants; and between rural and urban were no longer relevant and the German people were all one for the duration of the war. During the war, many Germans longed to have the sense of unity that the Burgfrieden inspired continue after the war, and it was during this period that many ideas started to circulate about how to convert the wartime Burgfrieden into a peacetime Volksgemeinschaft. People who belonged to the Volksgemeinschaft were known as Volksgenossen (fellow members).

In the aftermath of World War I, the idea of Volksgemeinschaft was used to interpret economic catastrophes and hardship facing Germans during the Weimar Republic era as a common experience of the German nation and to argue for German unity to bring about renewal to end the crisis. It was invoked by the Jewish social anarchists Gustav Landauer (who was killed for his participation in the Bavarian Soviet Republic) and Erich Mühsam (who died in Oranienburg concentration camp) in articulating their vision of a peaceful, non-coercive mutualist society. However, it was subsequently adopted by the Nazi Party to justify actions against Jews, profiteers, Marxists, and the Allies of World War I, whom the Nazis accused of obstructing German national regeneration, causing national disintegration in 1918 and Germany's defeat in World War I.

There is an ongoing debate among historians as to whether a Volksgemeinschaft was or was not successfully established between 1933 and 1945. This is a notably controversial topic of debate for ethical and political reasons, and is made difficult by the ambiguous language employed by Hitler and the Nazis when talking about the Volksgemeinschaft.

== Nazi Volksgemeinschaft ==
In the aftermath of the November Revolution of 1918 that marked the end of the German Empire and the beginning of the Weimar Republic, there was strong animosity amongst many Germans towards the Weimar Republic and the social democrats who sponsored its creation. This was combined with anxiety in the 1930s and with the severe economic crisis in Germany and abroad, in which many Germans faced unemployment. This situation resulted in increasing popularity for the Nazi Party, including amongst workers, small business owners, and others who desired a government that would resolve the economic crisis. While ascending to power, Hitler promised to restore faith in the Volk and to bring wholeness while accusing other politicians of tearing at German unity.

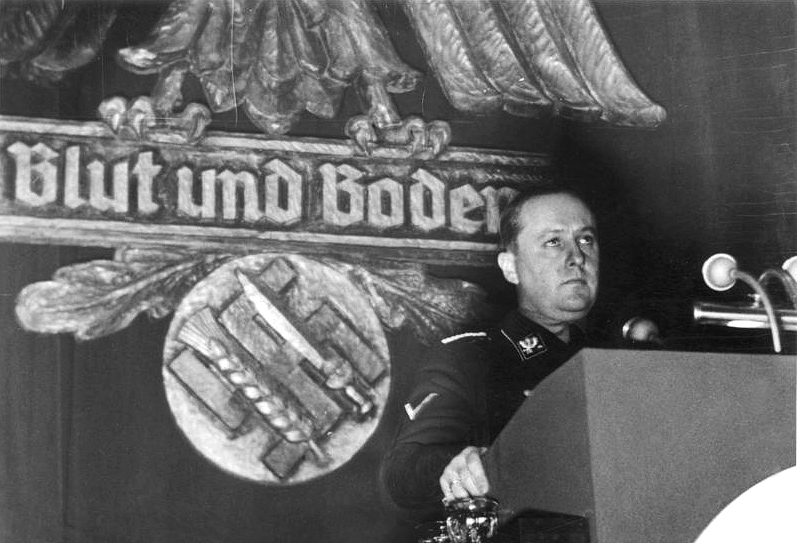
Richard Walther Darré addressing a meeting of the farming community in Goslar on 13 December 1937 standing in front of a Reichsadler and Swastika crossed with a sword and wheat ear labelled Blood and Soil (from the German Federal Archive)

Upon rising to power in 1933, the Nazis sought to gain support of various elements of society. Their concept of Volksgemeinschaft was racially unified and organized hierarchically. This involved a mystical unity, a form of racial soul uniting all Germans, including those living abroad. Nevertheless, this soul was regarded as related to the land, in the doctrine of "blood and soil". Indeed, one reason for "blood and soil" was the belief that landowner and peasant lived in an organic harmony. Aryan Germans who had sexual relations with non-Germanics were excluded from the people's community.

The Nazis solidified support amongst nationalists and conservatives by presenting themselves as allied with President Paul von Hindenburg, who was considered a war hero of World War I in Germany. On 21 March 1933, special celebrations were held to mark the re-opening of the Reichstag following the Reichstag fire, and the Nazis called this event Potsdam Day. Potsdam Day was used to celebrate military tradition, the Hohenzollern dynasty of Prussia, the sacrifices of World War I and the "hero of Tannenberg," President Hindenburg. The image of Hitler and Hindenburg shaking hands was reproduced on thousands of postcards, representing "the union of the new and old Germany," a way for the Nazis to portray themselves as connected to the aristocratic traditions of the past.

Having organized Potsdam Day to gain conservative support, the Nazis sought to gain the support of workers by declaring May Day, a day celebrated by organized labour, to be a paid holiday named the "Day of National Work" and held celebrations on 1 May 1933 to honour German workers. The regime believed that the only way to avoid a repeat of the disaster of 1918 was to secure workers' support for the German government. The regime also insisted through propaganda that all Germans take part in the May Day celebrations, not just workers, in the hope that this would help break down class hostility between workers and burghers. Songs in praise of labour and workers were played by state radio throughout May Day 1933, as well as an airshow in Berlin and fireworks. The Nazis added strongly nationalist themes to the celebrations, and Hitler spoke of workers as patriots who had built Germany's industrial strength and had honourably served in the war, while claiming that they had been oppressed under economic liberalism. Hitler praised the virtues of labor, and was quoted in the Völkischer Beobachter as declaring that "I only acknowledge one nobility—that of labour." The event proved convincing, as the next day the Berliner Morgenpost, a newspaper which had been associated with the political left in the past, praised the regime's May Day celebrations. At the same time, however, the Nazis sought to destroy independent working class organizations, seeing them as incompatible with the trans-class unity of the Volksgemeinschaft. On 2 May 1933, one day after the celebrations, the trade union movement was banned, and "stormtroopers sealed off and took over the operations of the socialist Free Trade Unions and incorporated them into what became the German Labor Front".

The Nazis continued social welfare policies initiated by the governments of the Weimar Republic and mobilized volunteers to assist those impoverished, "racially-worthy" Germans through the National Socialist People's Welfare organization. This organization oversaw charitable activities, and became the largest civic organization in Nazi Germany. Successful efforts were made to get middle-class women involved in social work assisting large families. The Winter Relief campaigns acted as a ritual to generate public feeling. These efforts also served to reinforce the racial ideology of the Nazis and the idea that the Volksgemeinschaft was a racial community, because Jews and other non-Aryans were excluded from social welfare benefits, as were Germans who opposed Nazism or who were deemed "unfit" for other reasons.

The Volksgemeinschaft was intended to create a sense of uniformity amongst its members; Fritz Reinhardt, state secretary for the finance ministry, introduced numerous tax breaks for lower and middle class Germans, narrowed pension gaps between blue and white collar workers, and lowered the entrance standards for civil service exams. The ubiquitous uniforms within Nazi organisations were intended to suppress visible class differences in dress and create an image of unity. Between 1933 and 1939, upward mobility was twice as likely as between 1927 and 1933. The Second World War assisted in this, as social status and class did not affect whether one received Reich services. Wartime rationing was implemented in an egalitarian manner, which greatly pleased the working class – a secret wartime report by the Social Democrats stated that "the working classes thoroughly welcome the fact that 'the better off' have, in practical terms, ceased to be that."

Nevertheless, in many ways the Nazi Volksgemeinschaft served only as a symbolic unity, while real differences of status and wealth continued to dominate daily life. The Nazis disparaged sophisticated forms of address such as gnädige Frau ("gracious lady") and the associated practice of kissing a lady's hand, but Hitler was routinely shown engaging in that same practice in press photographs. Old titles of nobility were shunned, but the Nazi Party hierarchy created numerous new titles. Elegant evening dress and other public displays of wealth were sometimes derided and sometimes encouraged. The Nazi Party claimed to administer justice impartially to all ethnic Germans regardless of their social origins, and Nazi propaganda emphasized instances where upper class individuals were found guilty by the courts as evidence of this, but at the same time the Nazi Party provided many opportunities for corruption and vested interests among its members. On one occasion the arrest of a Reichsbank director was widely publicized by the Nazi press, while his subsequent release was never mentioned.

=== In propaganda ===
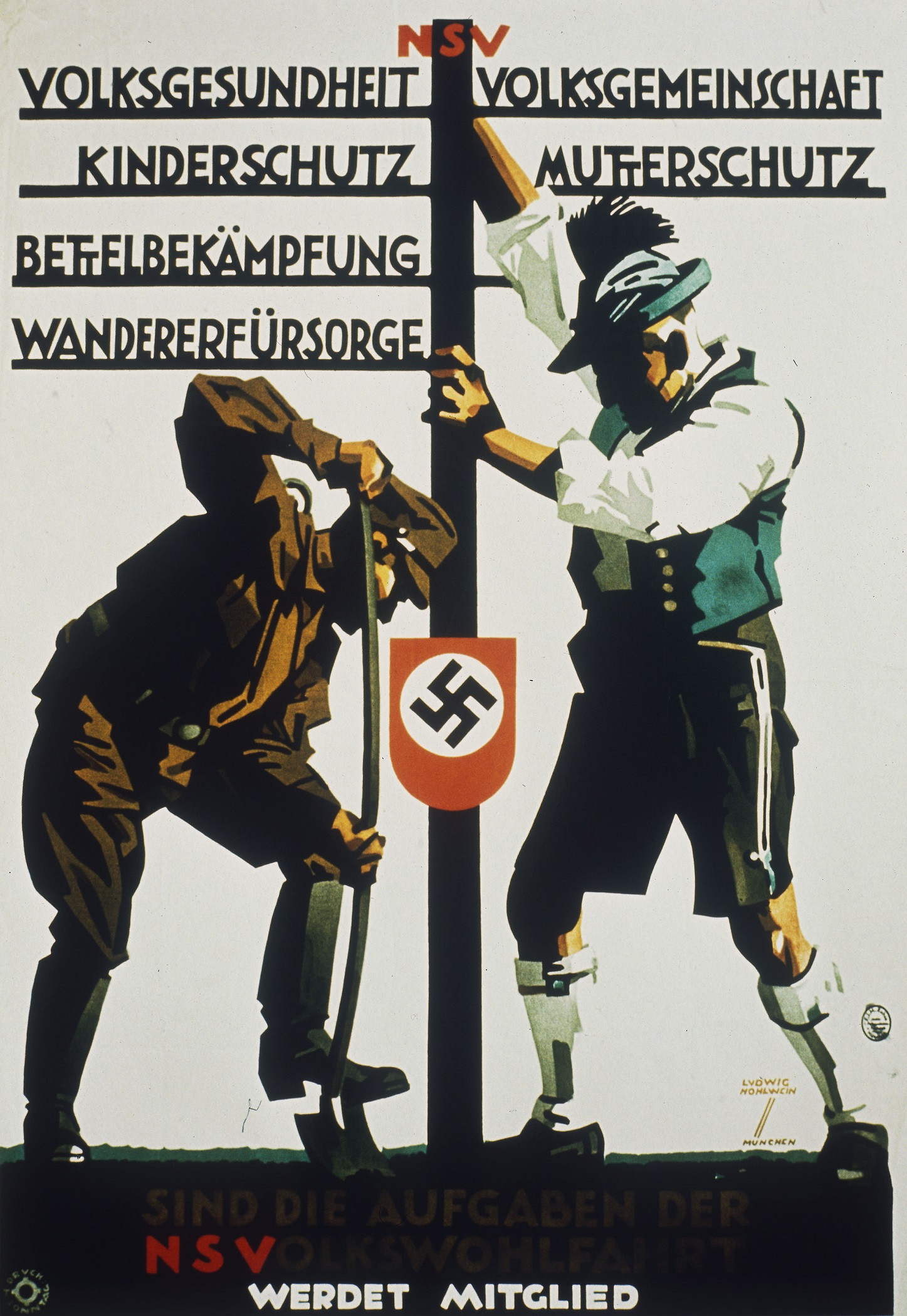
1934 poster, translated People's Health, Volksgemeinschaft, Protection of Children, Protection of Mothers, Combating Begging, Care for Hikers are the tasks of National Socialist People's Welfare: Become a Member.

Nazis gave a great deal of prominence to this new "folk community" in their propaganda, depicting the events of 1933 as a Volkwerdung, or a people becoming itself. The Volk were not just a people; a mystical soul united them, and propaganda continually portrayed individuals as part of a great whole, worth dying for. A common Nazi mantra declared that ethnic Germans must put "collective need ahead of individual greed" and oppose class conflict, materialism, and profiteering in order to ensure the survival of the Volk—a widespread sentiment in this era. To exemplify and encourage such views, when the Hitlerjugend and Bund Deutscher Mädel collected donations for Winterhilfswerk (Winter Relief), totals were not reported for any individuals, only what the branch raised. The Winterhilfswerk campaigns themselves acted as a ritual to generate public feeling. Organisations and institutions such as Hitlerjugend, Bund Deutscher Mädel, Winterhilfswerk, but also the Reich Labour Service and, above all, the Nazi party were portrayed as exemplifications and concrete manifestations of the "Volksgemeinschaft".

Hitler declared that he knew nothing of bourgeois or proletarian, only Germans. Volksgemeinschaft was portrayed as overcoming distinctions of party and social class. The commonality this created across classes was among the great appeals of Nazism.

After the failure of the Beer Hall Putsch, Hitler, in the trial, omitted his usual pre-putsch anti-Semitism and centered his defense on his selfless devotion to the good of the Volk and the need for bold action to save them. The Versailles settlement had betrayed Germany, which they had tried to save. Thereafter, his speeches concentrated on his boundless devotion to the Volk, though not entirely eliminating the anti-Semitism. Even once in power, his immediate speeches spoke of serving Germany. While the Reichstag fire was used to justify anti-Communist and anti-Semitic violence, Hitler himself spoke on a new life, honor, and unity in Germany. Similarly, the Night of the Long Knives was justified as a peril to the people so great that only decisive action would save them. Goebbels described Hitler after that event as suffering "tragic loneliness" and as a Siegfried forced to shed blood to preserve Germany.

Devotion to this Volk is common in Nazi propaganda. An account, for instance, of a SA brawl depicted its leader as uncouth and therefore a simple, strong, and honest man of the people. Sturmabteilung speakers were used, in part, for the appeal of their folksy manner. One element of Horst Wessel's life that was fictionalized out of the movie Hans Westmar was the willful provoking of violent conflicts with Communists; Westmar preaches class reconciliation, and his death unifies students and workers. These ideas were also propagandized to the Sturmabteilung, whose violent, rebellious and confrontational past had to be transformed into a community organization to be useful in a Germany where Nazis held official power.

This unity was what justified Nazi propaganda; its pejorative connotation had sprung solely from its selfish use, and the Nazis' honorable goal, the unity of the German people, made it honorable for them.

It also justified the one-party state as all that was needed in a society with a united will, where Hitler implemented the will of the Volk more directly than in a democracy. Attacks on Great Britain as a plutocracy also emphasized how the German, being able to participate in his Volk, is freer than the Briton.

In his pamphlet State, Volk and Movement, Carl Schmitt praised the expulsion of Jews from political life without ever using the term "Jew" and using "non-Aryan" only rarely, by praising the homogeneity of the people and the Volksgemeinschaft ensuing; merely Gleichschaltung was not sufficient, but Nazi principles must continue to make the German people pure. Even Carl Jung's "collective unconscious" was preferred to Freudian concepts because of its communal element.

The Volksgemeinschaft was also depicted in films on the home-front during World War II, with the war uniting all levels of society, as in the two most popular films of the Nazi era, Die grosse Liebe and Wunschkonzert. The Request Concert radio show, on which the latter film was based, achieved great popularity by broadcasting music claimed to be requested by men in the armed forces. Attempts to get women of "better classes" to take factory jobs were presented as breaking down class barriers and so helping create a true people's community. Failure to support the war was an anti-social act; this propaganda managed to bring arms production to a peak in 1944.

=== Categories of Germans ===
Nazi legal theory divided all Germans into two categories, namely the Volksgenossen ("Fellow Members") who belonged to the Volksgemeinschaft and the Gemeinschaftsfremde ("Community Aliens") who did not. In addition to the duties and responsibilities shared by those in the community, the Volksgenossen were expected to build and create a "Volksgeist" ("Volk spirit") that would encompass the best aspects of the German people. As such, community aliens could not belong, since they were deemed an undermining element in the very foundations of the "Volksgemeinschaft".

The modern German historian Detlev Peukert wrote the following about the purpose of Nazi social policy:

The goal was an utopian Volksgemeinschaft, totally under police surveillance, in which any attempt at nonconformist behaviour, or even any hint or intention of such behaviour, would be visited with terror.

Criminals, if deemed unable to be part of the people's community, were severely punished, even executed for crimes that did not provide for the death penalty, such as doubling the sentence the prosecution asked for when a defendant had not helped put out a fire, thus showing a disregard for the life of his "Volksgenossen" and community. In support of this, Peukert quoted two articles from the projected "Law for the Treatment of Community Aliens" of 1944, which though never implemented owing to bureaucratic quarrels showed the intentions of Nazi social policy:

Article I.

Community Aliens (Gemeinschaftsfremde)

1.

"Community Aliens" are such persons who:

1, Show themselves, in their personality or in the conduct of their life, and especially in light of any unusual deficiency of mind or character, unable to comply by their own efforts with the minimum requirements of the national community.

2.(a) owing to work-shyness or slovenliness, lead a worthless, unthrifty or disorderly life and are thereby a burden or danger to the community:

Or

Display a habit of, or inclination towards beggary or vagrancy, idling at work, larceny, swindling or other less seriously offences, or engage in excessive drunkenness, or for any such reasons are in breach of their obligation to support themselves.

Or

(b) through persistent ill-temper or quarrelsomeness disturb the peace of the community;

3. show themselves, in their personality or the conduct of their life, mentally disposed towards the commission of serious offences (community-hostile criminals [gemeinschaftsfeindliche Verbrecher]) and criminals by inclination [Neigungsverbrecher]).

Article II

Police Measures Against Community Aliens

2.

1. Community aliens should be subject towards police supervision.

2. If supervisory measures are insufficient, the police shall transfer the community aliens to the Gau (or Land) welfare authorities.

3. If, in the case of any community alien persons, a stricter degree of custody is required than is possible within the institutions of the Gau (or Land) welfare authorities, the police shall place them in a police camp."

=== Children and youth ===
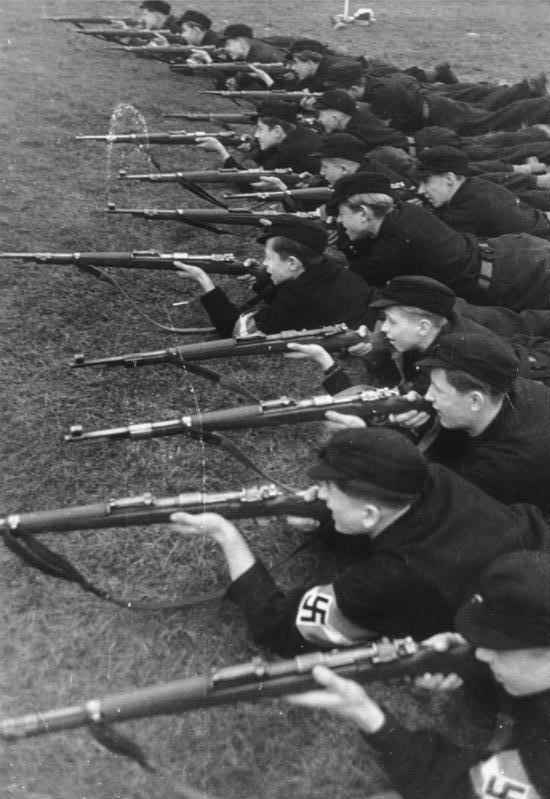
Hitler Youth at rifle practice, c. 1933

In their desire to establish a total state, the Nazis understood the importance of “selling” their ideology to the youth. To accomplish this, Hitler established Nazi youth groups. Young boys from 6–10 years old participated in the Pimpfen, similar to the cub scouts. Boys from 10–14 years old participated in the Deutsches Jungvolk, and boys 14–18 years old participated in the Hitler Jugend (Hitler Youth). The two older groups fostered military values and virtues, such as duty, obedience, honor, courage, strength, and ruthlessness. Uniforms and regular military drills were supplemented by ceremonies honoring the war dead. Most importantly, the Hitler Youth did their utmost to indoctrinate the youth of Germany with the ideological values of Nazism. Youth leaders bore into the youth a sense of fervent patriotism and utter devotion to Hitler, including military training so as to be ready to join the Wehrmacht. By 1939, when membership in the Hitler Youth became compulsory, each new member of the Jungvolk was required to take an oath to the Führer swearing total allegiance.

Young girls were also a part of the Hitler Youth in Nazi Germany. Girls from 10 to 14 years old were members of the Jungmädelbund, while girls fourteen to eighteen belonged to the Bund Deutscher Mädel. Hitler youth girls were instructed in the principles of service, regimentation, obedience, and discipline. Girls were taught to be dutiful wives and mothers. Members of the Bund Deutscher Mädel were educated in the skills needed for domestic chores, nursing, and hygiene.

In the early years of the Nazi regime, bonfires were made of school children's differently colored caps as symbolic of the abolition of class differences. But by the end of the 1930s, most Hitler Youth officials were recruited from wealthier families, and the use of differently colored sashes had returned to schools.

Daily life in Nazi Germany was manipulated from the beginning of Nazi rule. Propaganda dominated popular culture and entertainment. Finally, Hitler and the party realized the possibilities of controlling Germany's youth as a means of continuing the Reich as they wanted the generation of Germans to follow to be dedicated to the strengthening and preservation of the German Volk and of the "Greater German Reich".

== See also ==
- Blood and soil
- Class collaboration
- Gemeinschaft and Gesellschaft
- Martin Heidegger and Nazism
- Integralism
- Propaganda in Nazi Germany
