= Gozd, Ajdovščina =

Gozd
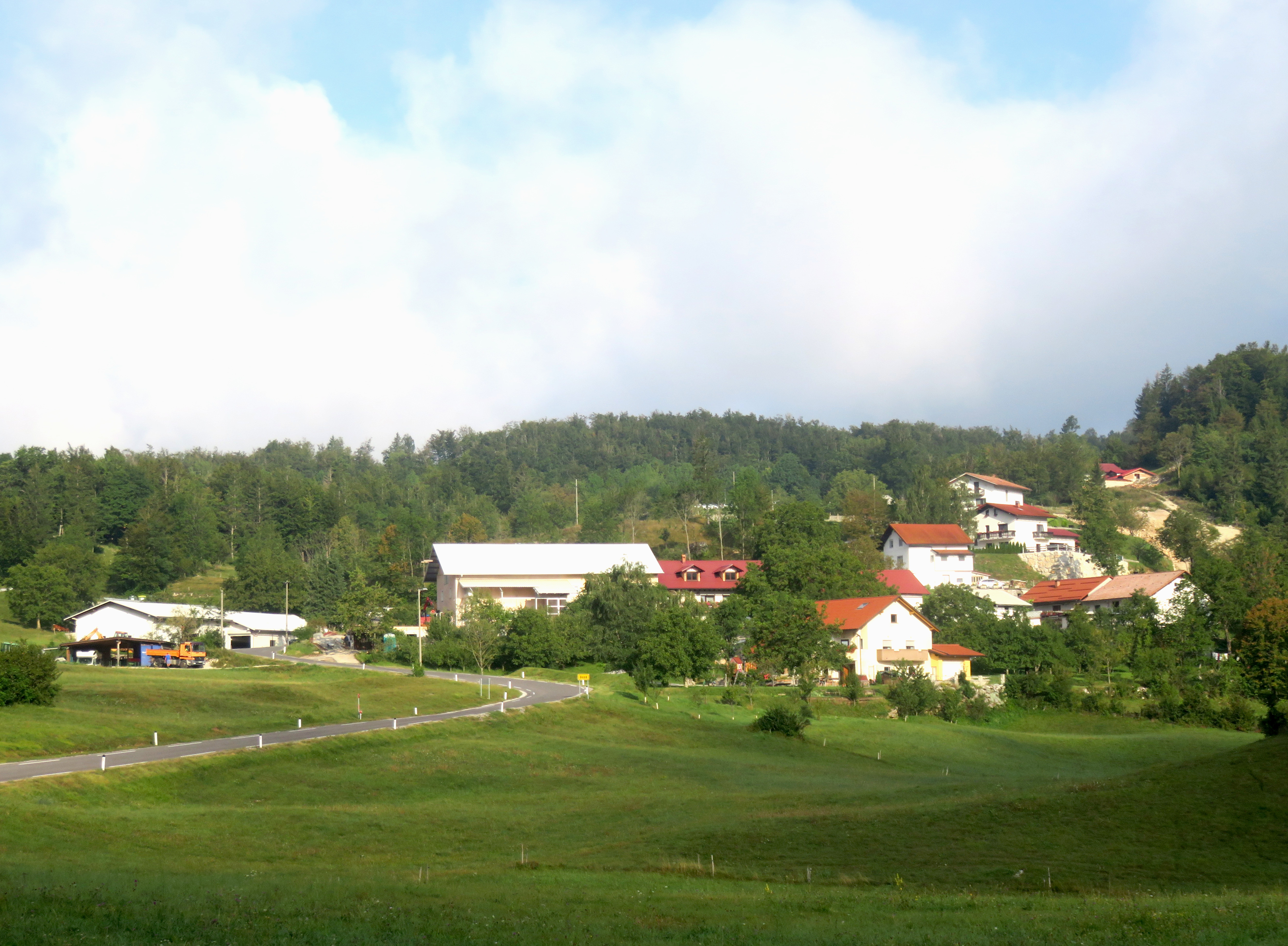

- Location in Slovenia
- Coordinates: 45°53′54.69″N 13°58′0.56″E
- Country: Slovenia
- Traditional region: Littoral
- Statistical region: Gorizia
- Municipality: Ajdovščina

Area
  - Total: 6.91 km^{2} (2.67 sq mi)
- Elevation: 725.5 m (2,380 ft)

Population (2020)
  - Total: 126

Gozd (pronounced [ˈɡoːst]) is a dispersed settlement on the edge of a karst plateau east of Ajdovščina in the Littoral region of Slovenia. Together with the ridge-top villages of Predmeja, Kovk, and Otlica, it is part of an area locally known as Gora (literally, 'the mountain').
