= Kovk, Ajdovščina =

Kovk
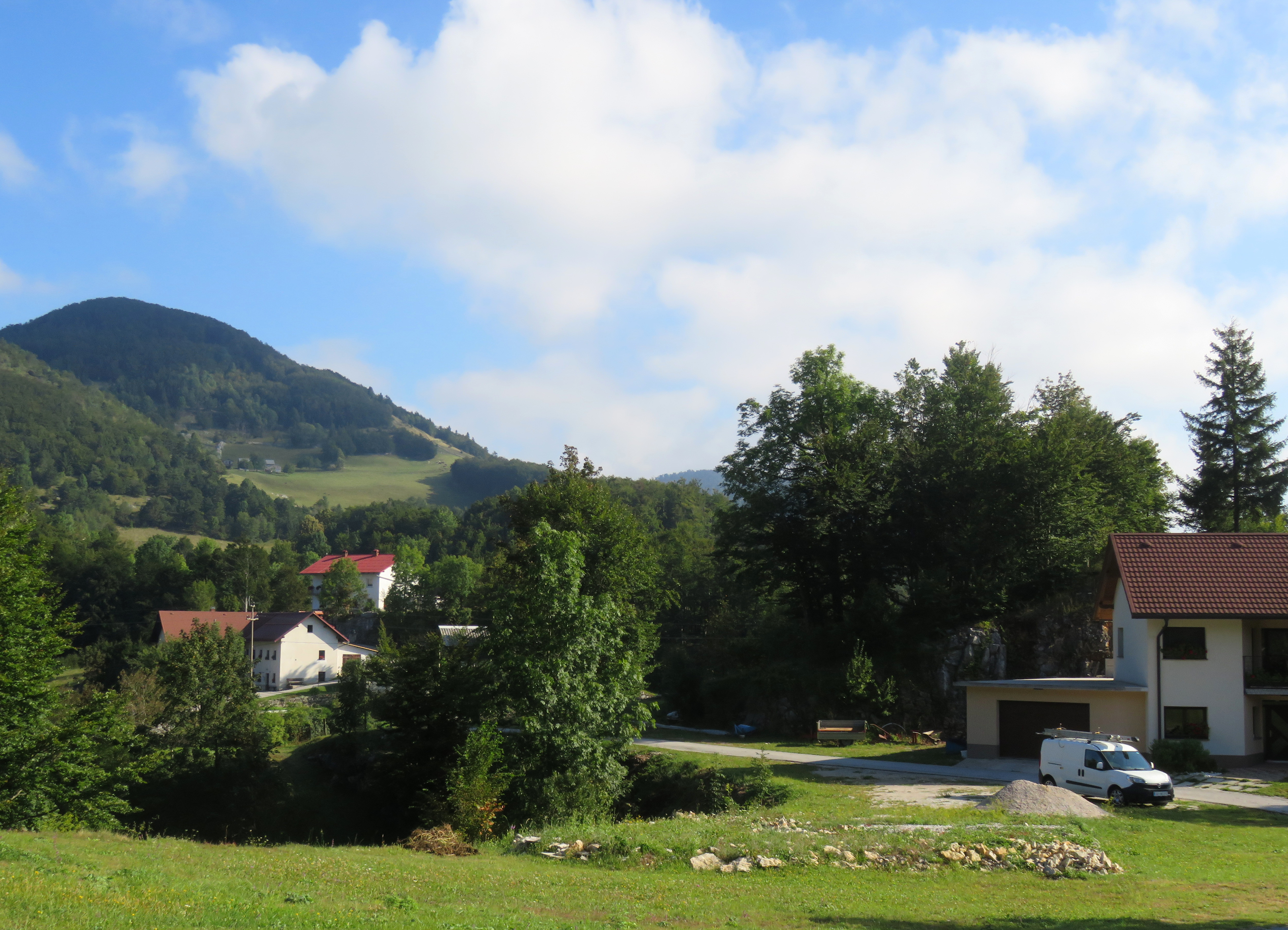

- Location in Slovenia
- Coordinates: 45°54′52.53″N 13°55′58.82″E
- Country: Slovenia
- Traditional region: Littoral
- Statistical region: Gorizia
- Municipality: Ajdovščina

Area
  - Total: 8.85 km^{2} (3.42 sq mi)
- Elevation: 824.3 m (2,704 ft)

Population (2020)
  - Total: 133

Kovk (pronounced [ˈkoːu̯k]) is a dispersed settlement on the edge of a karst plateau north of Ajdovščina in the Littoral region of Slovenia. Together with the ridge-top villages of Predmeja, Otlica, and Gozd, it is part of an area locally known as Gora (literally, 'the mountain').
