= Erich Hilgenfeldt =

German Nazi Party official (1897–1945)

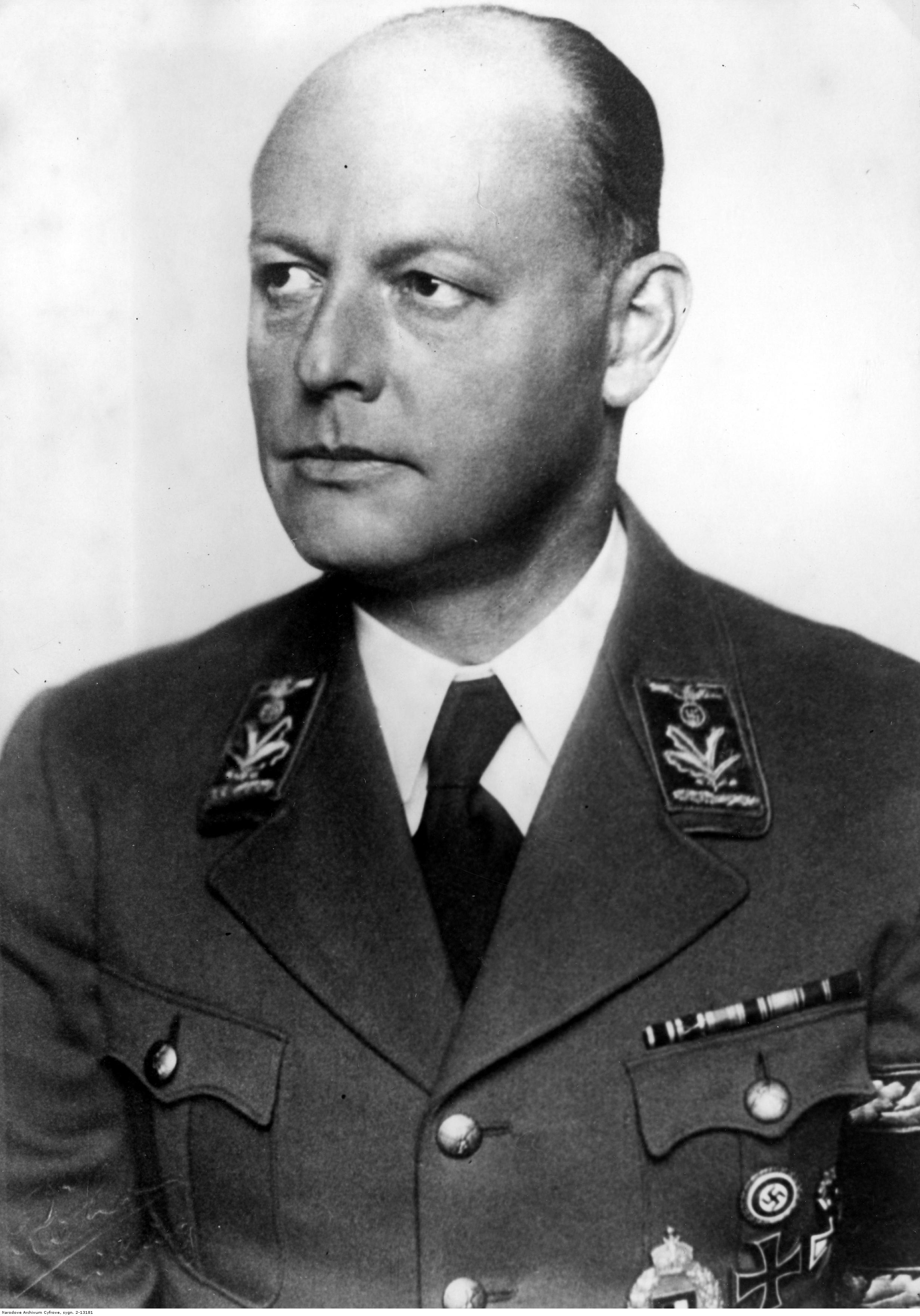

Leader of the National Socialist People's Welfare
- In office 20 April 1931 – May 1945
- Appointed by: Joseph Goebbels

Reich Commissioner for the Winterhilfswerk
- In office 21 September 1933 – May 1945

Personal details
- Born: 2 July 1897 Heinitz, Rhine Province, Kingdom of Prussia, German Empire
- Died: 25 April 1945 (aged 47) Likely in Berlin
- Party: Nazi Party
- Spouses: Marie-Charlotte Köhler (m. 1922; div. 1940) Leopoldine Statischek (m. 1940; died 1945)
- Children: 2
- Profession: Civil servant
- Civilian awards: Golden Party Badge

Military service
- Allegiance: German Empire; Nazi Germany
- Branch/service: Imperial German Army; Schutzstaffel
- Years of service: 1914–1918; 1937–1945
- Rank: Hauptmann; SS–Gruppenführer
- Unit: Field Artillery Regiment 55 (2nd Thuringian); Aviation Detachment A 206
- Military awards: Iron Cross, 1st and 2nd class Danzig Cross

Georg Paul Erich Hilgenfeldt (2 July 1897 – April/May 1945) was a German high ranking official in the Nazi Party and Nazi government. He served as a deputy in the Reichstag and was also an SS-Gruppenführer. He went missing during the Battle in Berlin, was presumed killed and was legally declared dead in 1957.

== Life ==
=== Early life and education ===
Hilgenfeldt was born on 2 July 1897 in Heinitz. He went to the Oberrealschule in Saarbrücken, whereafter he went to the Francke Foundations in Halle until Obersekunda (roughly Grade or Year 11).

=== Personal life ===
Married on 24 April 1922 to Marie-Charlotte Köhler, they separated around 1935 and finally divorced 30 November 1940. They had two children together, Reinhard (2 March 1923 – killed in action 2 November 1943 at the Trigno River area 1 km south of Tufillo/Italy) and another boy (1 October 1927). Hildgenfeldt then remarried on 6 December 1940 to Leopoldine Statischek (23 September 1907 at Novi Sad/Serbia – suicide by poison ? April/May 1945 at Berlin) from Wien.

=== World War I service and employment ===
Hilgenfeldt volunteered in August 1914 for service with the Imperial German Army in the First World War. He served on the front lines with Field Artillery Regiment 55 (2nd Thuringian). He was commissioned as a Leutnant of reserves in October 1915 and transferred to Aviation Detachment A 206 as an aerial observer in 1918. He left the military as an Hauptmann of reserves, having earned the Iron Cross, 1st and 2nd class. Returning to civilian life, he worked in the timber and mineral industries, ultimately advancing to a managerial position. From 1927, Hilgenfeldt obtained a government job on the staff of the Department of General Economic and Business Statistics in the Reich Statistical Office.

=== Nazi Party career ===
Hilgenfeldt was politically involved with the militant German veteran's organization, Der Stahlhelm before joining the Nazi Party on 1 August 1929 (membership number 143,642). By 1932, he had become a NSDAP Kreisleiter (District Leader) in Berlin and, by 1933, NSDAP Gauinspektor for Inspektion I Groß-Berlin. He was a Party organizer and propagandist and worked closely with the Berlin Gauleiter, Joseph Goebbels. By 1931, he was a municipal councilor for Berlin-Welmersdorf.

Hilgenfeldt worked as office head at the NSDAP Office for People's Welfare and in close association with the Nationalsozialistische Volkswohlfahrt (NSV), or the National Socialist People's Welfare. By organizing a charity drive to celebrate Hitler's Birthday on 20 April 1931, Goebbels named him the head of the NSV. The NSV was named the single Nazi Party welfare organ in May 1933. On 21 September 1933 he was appointed as Reich Commissioner for the Winterhilfswerk (Winter Relief Fund). Under Hilgenfeldt the programme was massively expanded, so that the régime deemed it worthy to be called the "greatest social institution in the world". So successful was he in building up the fund in a few weeks, that he was celebrated in the press as the "General of the Winter Relief Battle". One method of expansion was to absorb, or in NSDAP parlance coordinate, already existing but non-Nazi charity organizations. NSV was the second largest Nazi group organization by 1939, second only to the German Labor Front.

From November of the same year, Hilgenfeldt was a member of the Reich Work Chamber (Reichsarbeitskammer), as well as the Academy for German Law and an honorary judge at the Supreme Honour and Disciplinary Court. As NSV leader, he was also Reich Women's Leader (Reichsfrauenführerin) Gertrud Scholtz-Klink's superior. Also by virtue of his NSV office, he was the head of the German union of private charitable organizations, which included among its members the Protestant Inner Mission organization and the Catholic Caritas, as well as the NSV itself. In 1933, he served in the Prussian Landtag until its dissolution in October. At the November 1933 parliamentary election, he obtained a seat in the Reichstag from electoral constituency 2 (Berlin) and retained this seat until his death.

Hilgenfeldt spoke at the Nuremberg Party Rally in 1936, during the third session of the Party conference.

On 9 September 1937, Hilgenfeldt joined the Allgemeine SS as an SS-Oberführer with member number 289,225, and then was promoted on 30 January 1939 to SS-Brigadeführer. He was assigned to the personal staff of the Reichsführer-SS.

In the course of Hilgenfeldt's career, he was not only made an honorary judge, but also appointed Chairman of the Reich Association for Offender Support (Reichsverband für Straffälligenbetreuung). Furthermore, he was also awarded the Danziger Kreuz, first class. He ultimately reached the rank of SS-Gruppenführer.

=== Death ===
Hilgenfeldt went missing in late April 1945 during the Battle in Berlin. He is thought to have died either during the house-to-house fighting or by committing suicide, but the circumstances of his death are still unclear. On 5 June 1945, the director of the Berlin Caritas reported: "In the Main Office for People's Welfare … there was heavy fighting. Hilgenfeldt is dead. A sign had been hung around his neck: 'Here lies the criminal Hilgenfeldt'".

Hilgenfeldt had a sister named Hedwig who officially had Erich and his wife Leopoldine declared dead at the register's office in Berlin-Charlottenburg, in 1957.

== See also ==
- List of people who disappeared
