= National Socialist People's Welfare =

Nazi social-welfare organization

- Nationalsozialistische Volkswohlfahrt
- Abbreviation: NSV
- Formation: 1931; 95 years ago
- Founded at: Berlin
- Dissolved: 10 October 1945; 81 years ago (by Allied Control Council Act #2)
- Type: Welfare organization
- Purpose: Welfare services for the German racial community
- Location(s): Weimar Republic; Nazi Germany
- Region served: Germany
- Services: Food distribution, day-nurseries, Holiday homes for mothers
- Members: 4.7 million (1935)
- Leader: Erich Hilgenfeldt
- Parent organization: Nazi Party (as of 10 April 1935)
- Funding: Central government subsidy Public contributions Employment taxes Punitive taxes on non-German forced labour Expropriation in occupied territories
- Volunteers: 520,000 (1935)

The National Socialist People's Welfare (German: Nationalsozialistische Volkswohlfahrt, NSV) was a social welfare organization during the Third Reich. The NSV was originally established in 1931 as a small Nazi Party-affiliated charity, which was active locally in the city of Berlin. On 3 May 1933, shortly after the Nazi Party took power in Weimar Germany, Adolf Hitler turned it into a party organization that was to be active throughout the country. The structure of the NSV was based on the Nazi Party model, with local (Ort), county (Kreis) and district (Gau) administrations.

== Nazi opposition to social welfare ==
While the Nazi Party had existed since 1920, it did not initially set up its own social welfare department as several other German political parties had done. Nazi ideology was in principle unfavourable to the idea of social welfare. Writing in Mein Kampf about his time spent among the poor in Vienna, Hitler expressed indignation against social welfare for helping the degenerate and the feeble. The Nazis believed that the German race had to be strengthened through a process of natural selection, which required weeding out its weakest elements, so they condemned the goals of charity and philanthropy. They opposed the extensive welfare system of the Weimar Republic for being wasteful, bureaucratic, and helping the wrong people, since it distributed welfare benefits indiscriminately without regard for race and often assisted people that the Nazis considered inferior.

== Foundation in Berlin ==
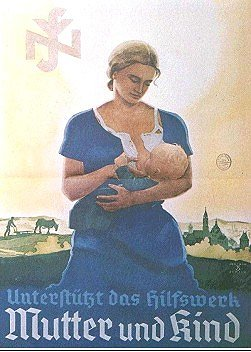
NSV poster, 1935: The charity Mutter und Kind ('Mother and Child') supported "Aryan" pregnant women and young mothers, and their offspring. The work was primarily carried out by volunteers, particularly members of the NS-Frauenschaft and the NS-Volkswohlfahrt.

By the 1930s, however, the Great Depression had caused mass unemployment in Germany, and it had become politically untenable for the Nazis to write off the destitute as not worth helping. In 1931, Joseph Goebbels, the Gauleiter (regional Nazi Party leader) of Berlin, realized the propaganda potential of a small Nazi People's Welfare Association founded by one of the Berlin party branches, and sought to expand it. Goebbels placed Erich Hilgenfeldt in charge of this association, after Hilgenfeldt had organized a successful charity drive to celebrate Adolf Hitler's birthday on 20 April 1931.

== Expansion of NSV and disbanding of other welfare organisations ==
Two years later, after Hitler was appointed Chancellor of Germany, the NSV became established as the single Nazi Party welfare organ on 3 May 1933. On 21 September in the same year, Hilgenfeldt was appointed as Reich Commissioner for the Winterhilfswerk (Winter Support Programme). Hitler directed Hilgenfeldt to "see to the disbanding of all private welfare institutions" and to "take charge of the Caritas organisation and the Inner Mission," so as to exclude Jews, non-Germans, opponents of the Nazi regime, and other "racially inferior" persons from receiving aid. Before the Nazi seizure of power, there had been seven main charitable networks in Germany: two socialist welfare organizations (one run by the SPD and the other by the KPD), the Christian workers' welfare association, the national Jewish charitable agency, the Roman Catholic Caritas, the Protestant Inner Mission, and the German Red Cross. The Nazis disbanded the socialist and Christian workers' associations and seized their assets, while allowing the Caritas and Inner Mission to continue as independent welfare organizations, restricted the activities of the Jewish agency to helping ethnic Jews, and sought to "coordinate" the remaining three agencies under the control of the NSV. The non-Nazi charities were forced to accept the principles of eugenics and refrain from helping those deemed biologically unfit, while the German Red Cross was compelled to appoint Nazis to prominent positions.

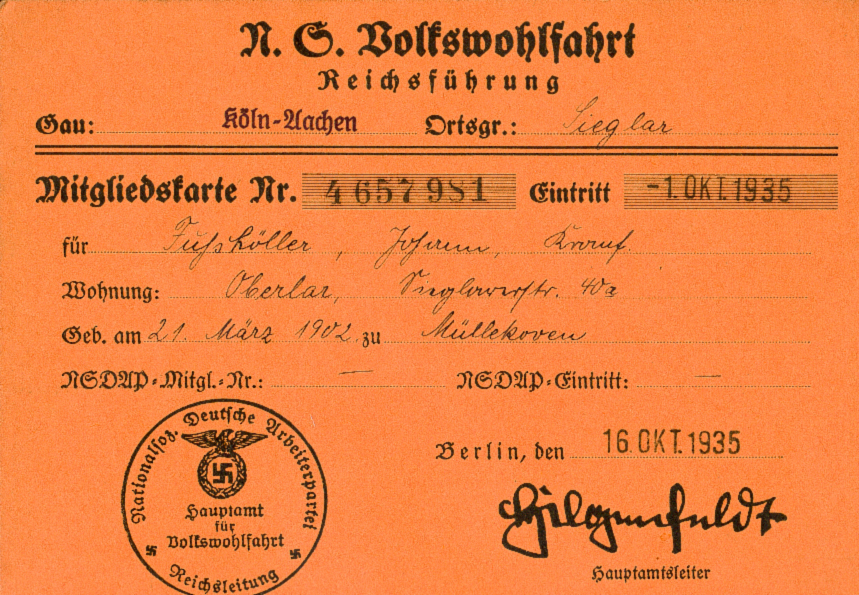
NSV membership card, 1935

The NSV was the second largest Nazi group organization by 1935, second only to the German Labour Front. It had 4.7 million members and 520,000 volunteer workers. Nazi Party members who were active in communal welfare professionally or as volunteers had to be NSV members.

== Racially and socially restrictive criteria ==
The NSV restricted its assistance from the very beginning to individuals of "Aryan descent" who met a range of conditions to be deemed worthy of support, officially stating that its aim was to promote "the living, healthy forces of the German people." The list of those excluded from NSV benefits was composed of "alcoholics, tramps, homosexuals, prostitutes, the 'work-shy' or the 'asocial', habitual criminals, the hereditarily ill (a widely defined category), Communists, Socialists, Social Democrats, and members of races other than the Aryan." Within these limitations, 17 million Germans received assistance under the auspices of NSV by 1939, and the agency operated 8,000 day-nurseries, funded holiday homes for mothers, distributed additional food for large families and was involved with a wide variety of other facilities. It "projected a powerful image of caring and support" for those who were seen as full members of the German racial community, while also inspiring fear through its intrusive questioning and the threat of opening a Gestapo investigation on those who did not fulfill the criteria for support.

Under the NSV, German social welfare and voluntary charity were thoroughly restructured to follow the racial and ideological goals of the Nazi state. The Nazi government declared that in the future, welfare and charitable aid would be granted only to individuals who were "racially superior" and could prove their value to the Volksgemeinschaft. The criteria for receiving aid were both racial and political, as individuals could be denied assistance for being Jewish and also for being Communists, Social Democrats, or other political opponents of the regime. The NSV sought to apply these principles to all areas of public and private assistance and charitable work, by extending its competence and control as broadly as possible. Thus, for example, one of the NSV branches, the Office of Institutional and Special Welfare, asserted its authority over all activities related to "travellers' aid at railway stations; relief for ex-convicts; support for re-migrants from abroad; assistance for the physically disabled, hard-of-hearing, deaf, mute, and blind; relief for the elderly, homeless and alcoholics; and the fight against illicit drugs and epidemics." Another branch, the Office of Youth Relief, which had 30,000 offices by 1941, took the job of supervising "social workers, corrective training, mediation assistance" and dealing with judicial authorities to prevent juvenile delinquency.

== Activities ==
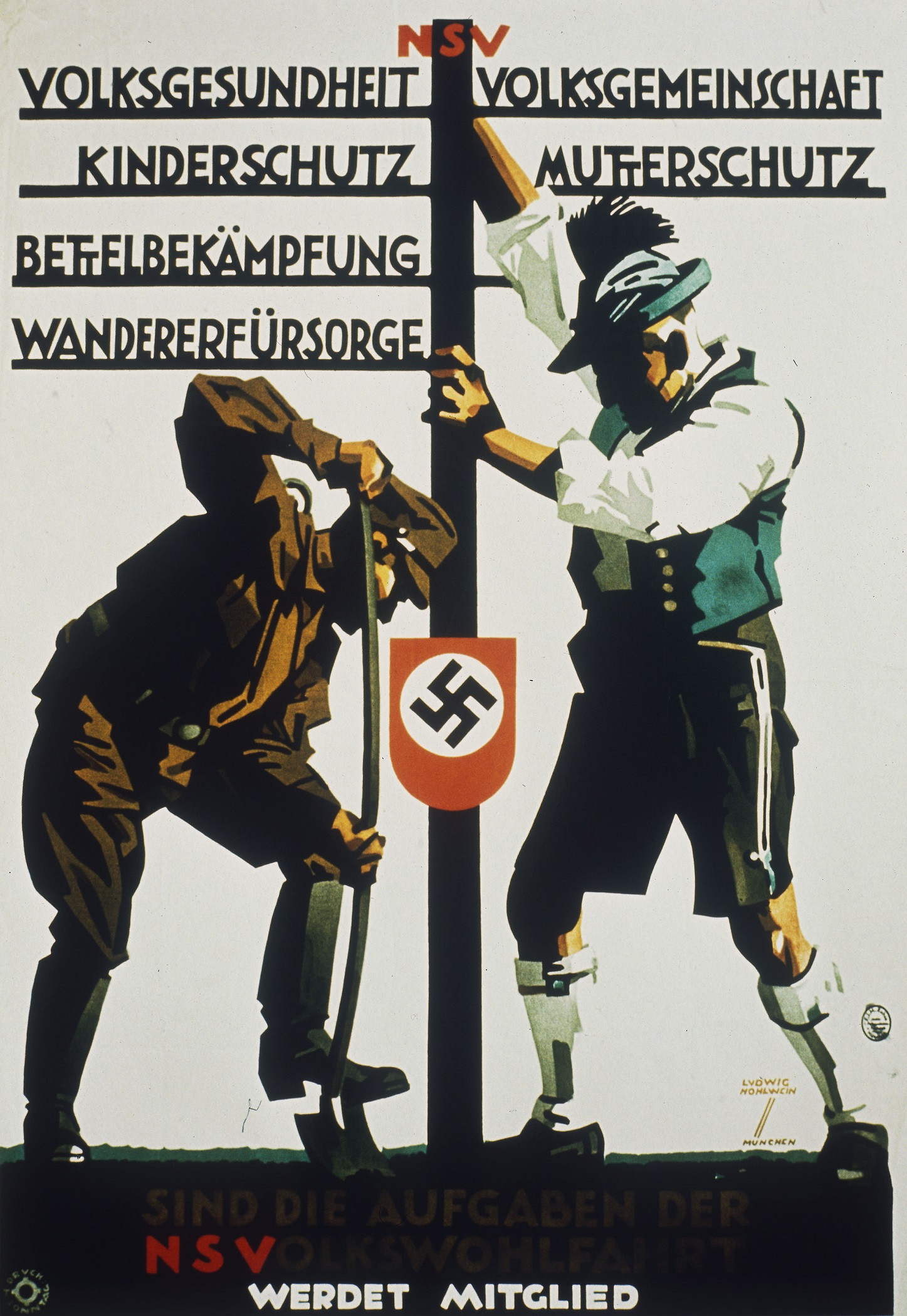
1934 poster, translated People's Health, Volksgemeinschaft, Protection of Children, Protection of Mothers, Combating Begging, Care for Hikers are the tasks of the National Socialist People's Welfare: Become a Member.

One of the NSV's main activities was the Winter Relief of the German People (Winterhilfswerk), which coordinated an annual drive to collect charity for the poor to provide them with heating and food over the winter months. Goebbels claimed that this was neither state welfare nor charity, but rather a new type of "racial self-help run by the German people for the German people." The Winter Relief program officially relied on voluntary donations, but in practice those donations were often collected by armed members of the Nazi Party going door to door in uniform, or by Hitler Youth members who were keeping lists of who had or had not contributed. A law was passed in 1934 that allowed the Interior Minister and the Nazi Party Treasurer to suspend any charities that competed with the Winterhilfswerk; this was used to force the other charities to limit their collection drives to the summer months.

In 1939, the NSV was also involved in the distribution of soup to the citizens of Warsaw after the city's surrender. Jews were excluded from the effort, which focused on the propaganda value.

== Funding ==
During World War II, the NSV took over more and more governmental responsibilities, especially in the fields of child and youth labor. The NSV budget routinely ran a deficit and had to be subsidized with funds from the central government, and these subsidies increased significantly just before and after the outbreak of war, more than doubling in three budgetary years from 640.4 million Reichsmarks in 1938 to 1.395 billion Reichsmarks by 1941. The Nazi government did not wish to increase taxes on German citizens to pay for the NSV's expenses, so an alternative solution was found: theft of benefits and wages from forced laborers and the populations of conquered territories. The forced labor of non-Germans and the confiscation of Jewish assets were used to provide the necessary subsidies for the NSV during the war, especially after 1941.

== Disbandment ==
In 1945, after Nazi Germany's defeat in World War II, the Allied Military Government issued a special law outlawing the Nazi Party and all of its branches. Known as Law number five, this denazification decree disbanded the NSV, like all organizations linked to the Nazi Party. New social welfare organizations were established during the postwar reconstruction of both West and East Germany.

== See also ==
- Blood and soil
- National Socialist War Victim's Care
- List of Nazi Party organizations
