= Volksgenosse =

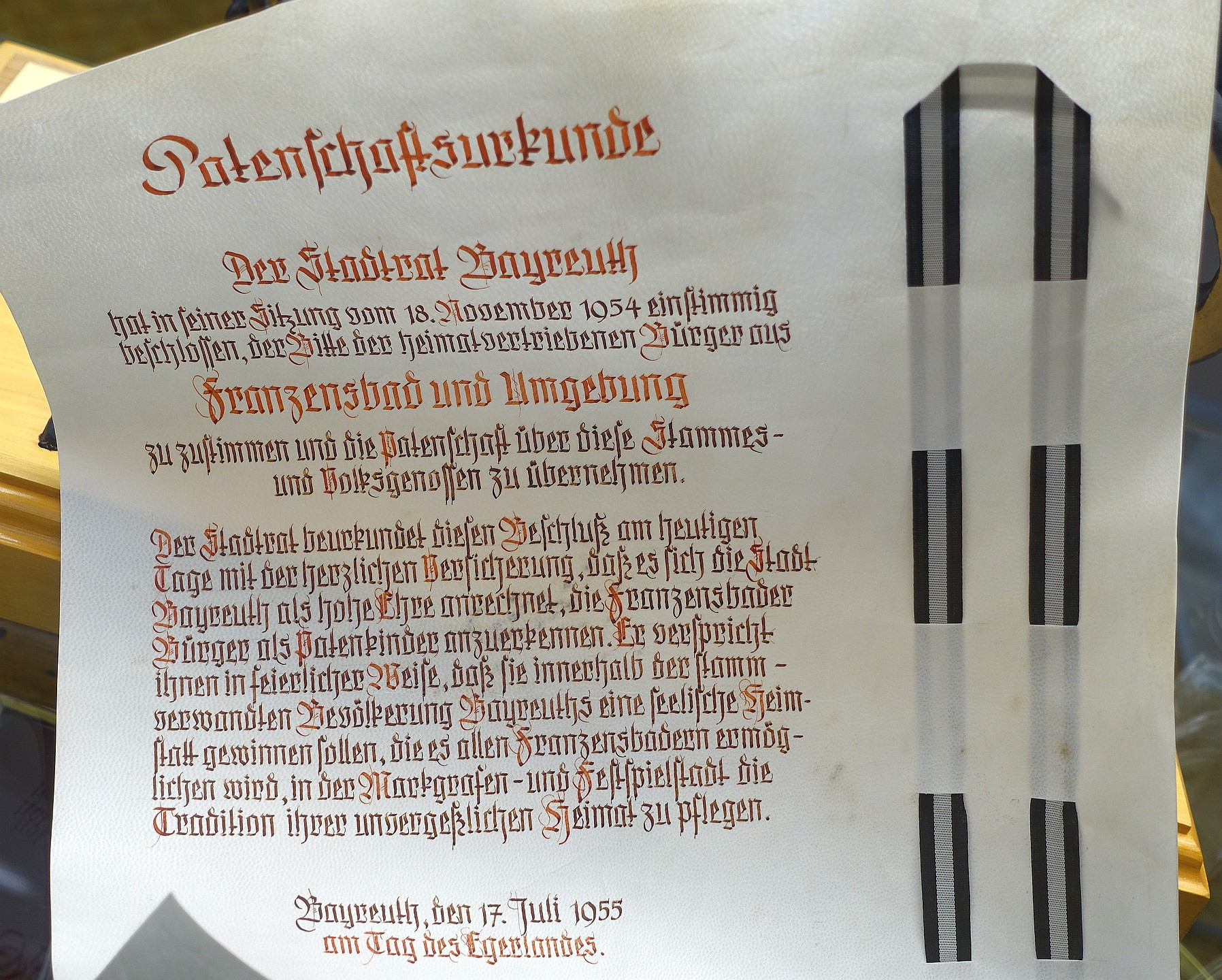
Certificate of support for the volksgenosse expelled from Czechoslovakia issued by Bayreuth City Council in 1955.

Volksgenosse (plural Volksgenossen) is a German language term meaning a fellow member of a community or compatriot (translated literally as people's comrade). The word was recorded as early as 1798 and its usage grew within the Völkisch movement of German ethnic nationalism, which led to its use to denote a person of the same "blood community". The term became common parlance within the Nazi Party, then the Third Reich, as a way to distinguish ethnic Germans from other groups, such as Jews and Gypsies. Due to these associations, the word gradually fell out of use after Germany's defeat in World War II and subsequent denazification efforts.

Volksgenosse was formalised in point 4 of the Nazi Party's 25-point Program in 1920 as a racial ideological term: "Only a Volksgenosse can be a citizen. Volksgenossen are only those of German blood, regardless of [religious] denomination. No Jew can therefore be a Volksgenosse".

Adolf Hitler extended the racial connections with phrases such as "Volks- und Rassegenossen" and "rassen- und nationalbewußten Volksgenossen" (race- and nation-conscious Volksgenossen) in his 1924 book Mein Kampf. This was to further differentiate it from the more inclusive, general term Genosse (comrade) which was being used by members of both the Social Democratic Party of Germany and the Communist Party of Germany.

After 1933, Volksgenosse became a much-used buzzword in the Third Reich, and it was used as an opening at speeches and rallies. From the outset, the term excluded people on a race basis and it also took on a status that excluded the Black triangle groups (the disabled, sex and gender minorities, alcoholics, homeless, beggars and sex workers). Population groups that were classified as "anti-social" or disabled were not considered to be Volksgenossen. The Winterhilfswerk appeals for charity were marketed as an appeal to the common sense of the Volksgenossen.

In the early years of the Nazi regime, Slavs were also considered to be of "related blood" to Germans. This position later changed with the so-called Polish decrees of 8 March 1940, and it was made explicit in the secret order of the Reichsführer-SS Heinrich Himmler on 23 March 1942, who noted the "clear demarcation of the non-Germanic peoples, especially from the Slavs and Fremdarbeiter (foreign workers), who for racial reasons are members of non-Germanic peoples to be regarded as capable of Germanisation." There was no binding definition of Volksgenosse in this regard. Although ideas of belonging to the German people traditionally relied on ethnic, cultural and denominational similarities, a special position was granted to other "Germanic peoples", such as Scandinavians, Dutch and Flemish people. They were regarded as belonging to the same racial family with the long-term aim being that these people be "transferred spiritually to the imperial unity and biologically into a common blood body with the German people".

The earlier German citizenship law of 1913 used jus sanguinis (right of blood) to determine the inheritance of citizenship. It did not explicitly incorporate the racial notions found within the Nuremberg Laws established by the Nazis in 1935, but the Nazis did not need to formally change the Reich and Citizenship Act (RuStAG) because non-Volksgenosse were stripped of citizenship and given the diminished status of subjects of the state.

== See also ==
- German diaspora
