= Predmeja =

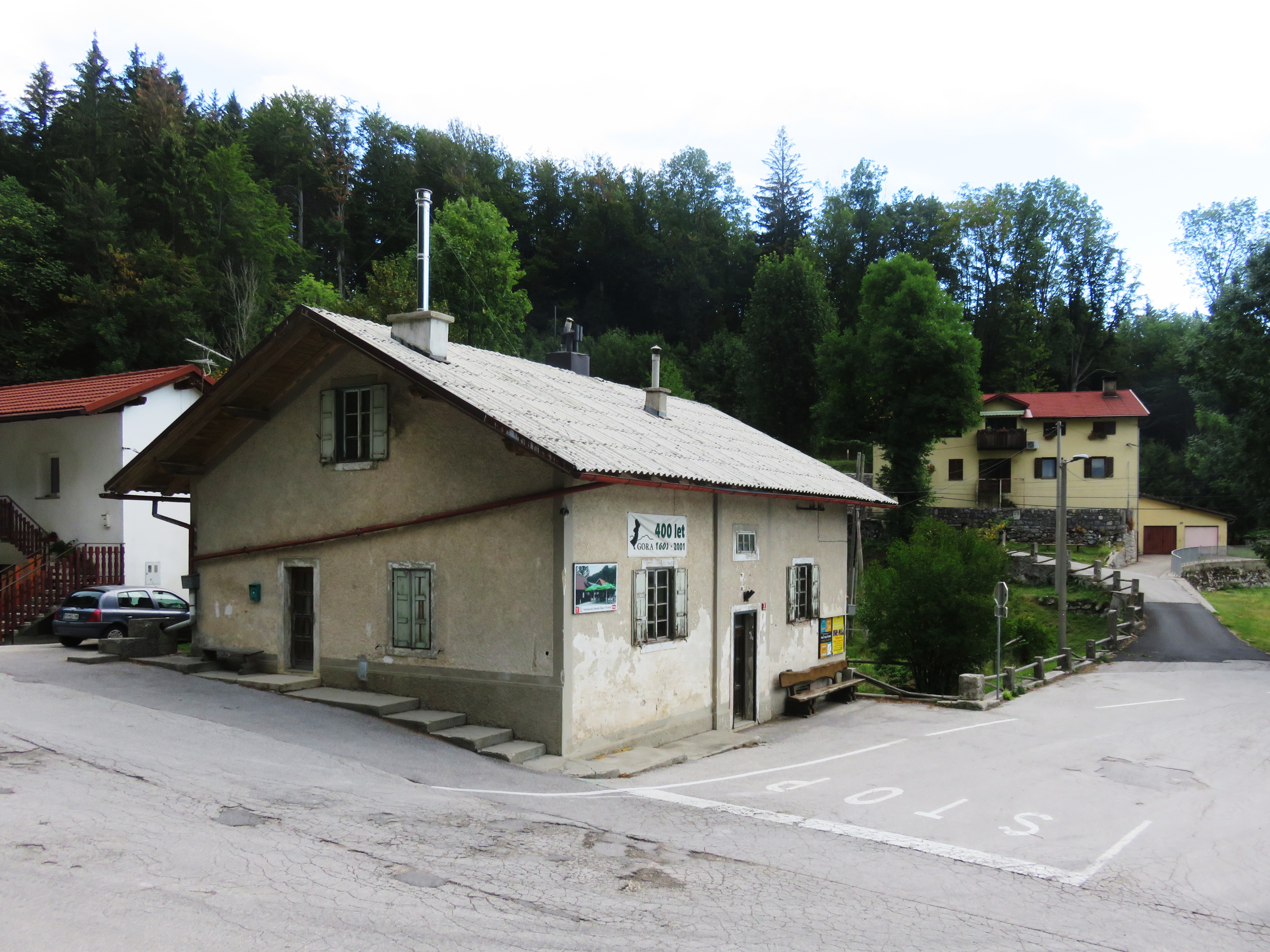

- Location in Slovenia
- Coordinates: 45°56′38.85″N 13°53′16.13″E
- Country: Slovenia
- Traditional region: Littoral
- Statistical region: Gorizia
- Municipality: Ajdovščina

Area
  - Total: 20.74 km^{2} (8.01 sq mi)
- Elevation: 896.5 m (2,941 ft)

Population (2020)
  - Total: 368
  - Density: 17.7/km^{2} (46.0/sq mi)

Predmeja (pronounced [pɾɛdˈmɛːja]; formerly Dol pri Otlici) is a settlement in the Municipality of Ajdovščina in the Littoral region of Slovenia. It is on the edge of a karst plateau north of the town of Ajdovščina, overlooking the Vipava Valley. Together with the ridge-top villages of Otlica, Kovk, and Gozd, it is part of an area locally known as Gora (literally, 'mountain').

== History ==
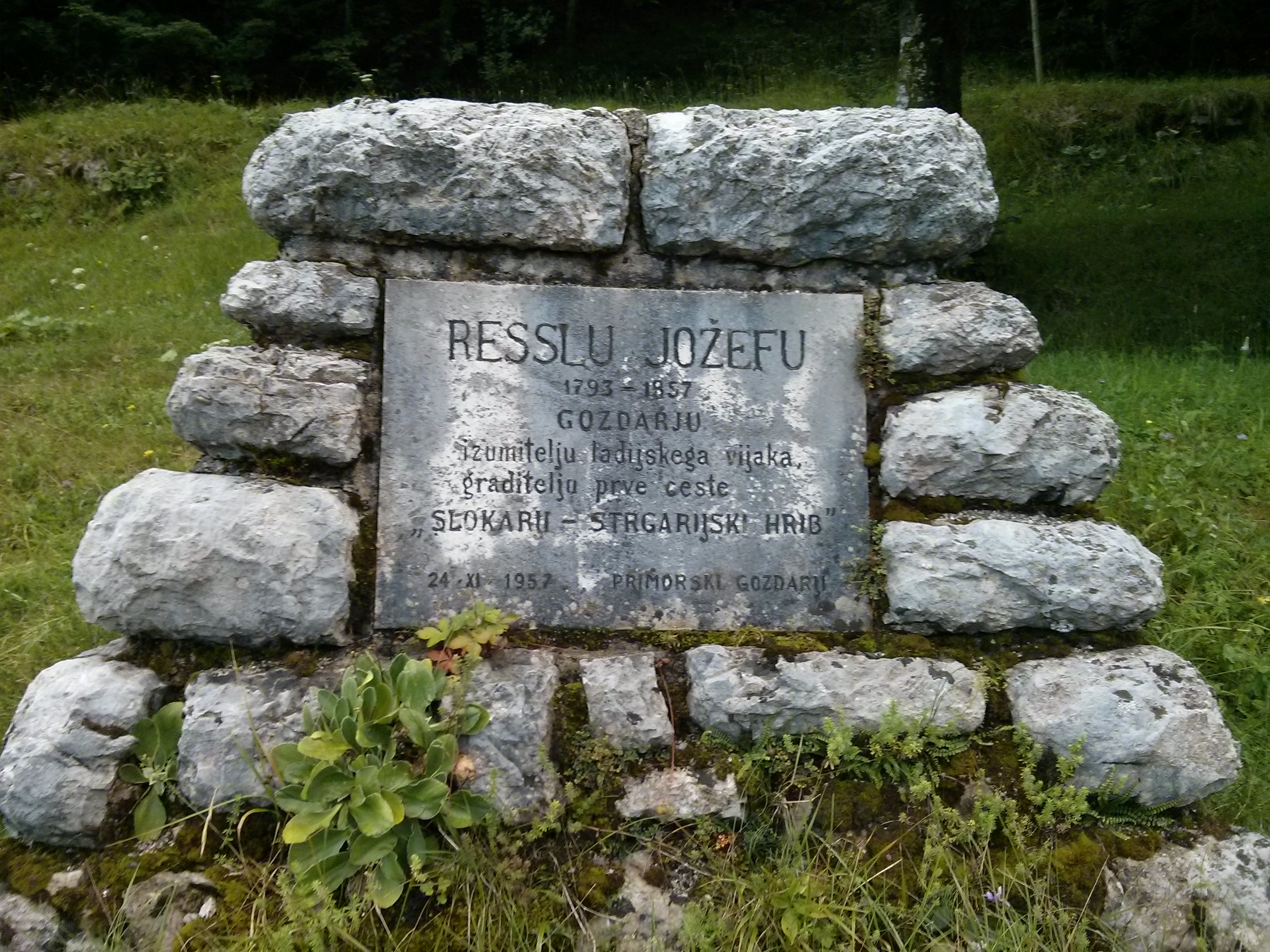
Ressel plaque

In the 19th century, the engineer Josef Ressel (1793–1857) prepared a plan for reforesting the slopes of the Čaven Plateau above Predmeja; a plaque commemorating his efforts was unveiled in 1957. Ressel also laid out the road from Predmeja to Strigarija Hill. The less demanding road to Predmeja via the Platna slope was built between 1893 and 1896.

Before the Second World War, ice was harvested at the Big Paradana Ice Cave (Slovene: Velika ledena jama v Paradani) and sold in Trieste. After the war, the ice continued to be sold in Ajdovščina for some time. During the Second World War, there were clashes between the Partisans and German forces in the Predmeja area; particularly fierce engagements took place in late September 1943, February and October 1944, and March 1945. During the war, German forces burned 90 houses in Predmeja and killed 77 people.

=== Mass graves ===
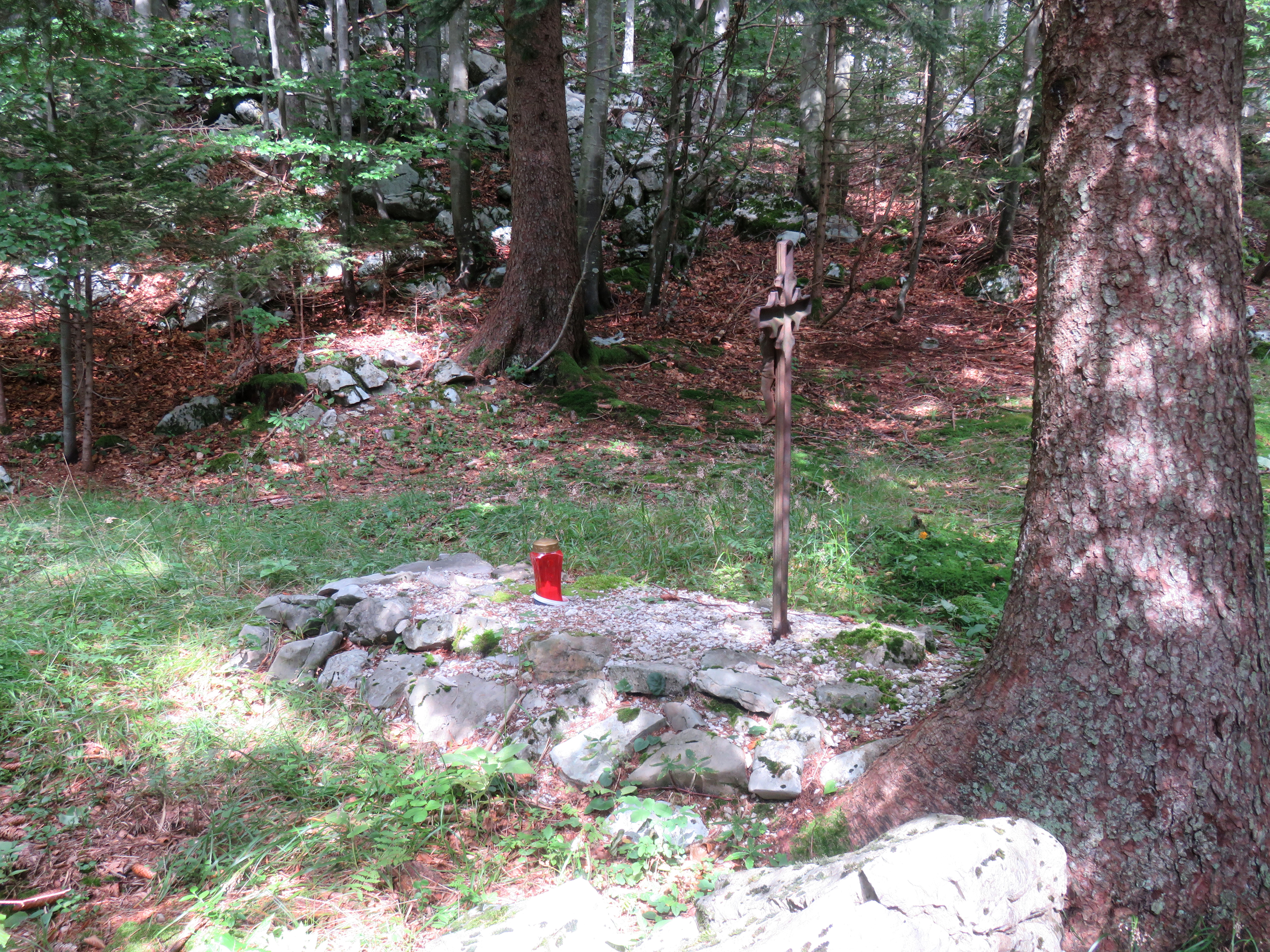
The Medvedovše Grave

Predmeja is the site of four known mass graves associated with the Second World War. The Rob Shaft Mass Grave (Slovene: Grobišče Brezno za Robom) is located on the Trnovo Forest Plateau (Slovene: Trnovski gozd), east of Predmeja. It contains the remains of German soldiers and unidentified civilians. The Medvedovše Shaft Mass Grave (Grobišče Brezno za Medvedovšem) is located on the Trnovo Forest Plateau, about 1 kilometer (0.62 mi) northeast of Predmeja. It contains the remains of unidentified victims. The Medvedovše Grave (Grob Medvedovše) is located on the Trnovo Forest Plateau, at a small level spot on the slope left of the road branching off to the north at the Medvedovše farm (Predmeja no. 83). It contains the remains of a Partisan soldier murdered by other Partisans during the war. The Bratin Shaft Mass Grave (Grobišče Bratinov brezen) is located on the edge of the Trnovo Forest Plateau, east of Predmeja, and the top of a headwall above the cliff over the Lokavšček Springs. The entrance is on a cliff shelf. The grave contains the remains of seven Partisans killed by Italian troops.

=== 2016 aircraft crash ===
The German millionaire Thomas Wagner from Unister Holding GmbH, Germany died at age 38 in an airplane accident in this area on July 14, 2016. Wagner was a German internet star that founded Unister in 2002 in the eastern German city of Leipzig. This large online company has employed as many as 2,100 employees and operates 60 European travel websites (e.g., ab-in-den-urlaub.de in Germany and fly24.co.uk in UK).

== Notable people ==
Notable people that were born in Predmeja include the following:

- Narte Velikonja (1891–1945), Slovene writer and cultural figure
