= Otlica =

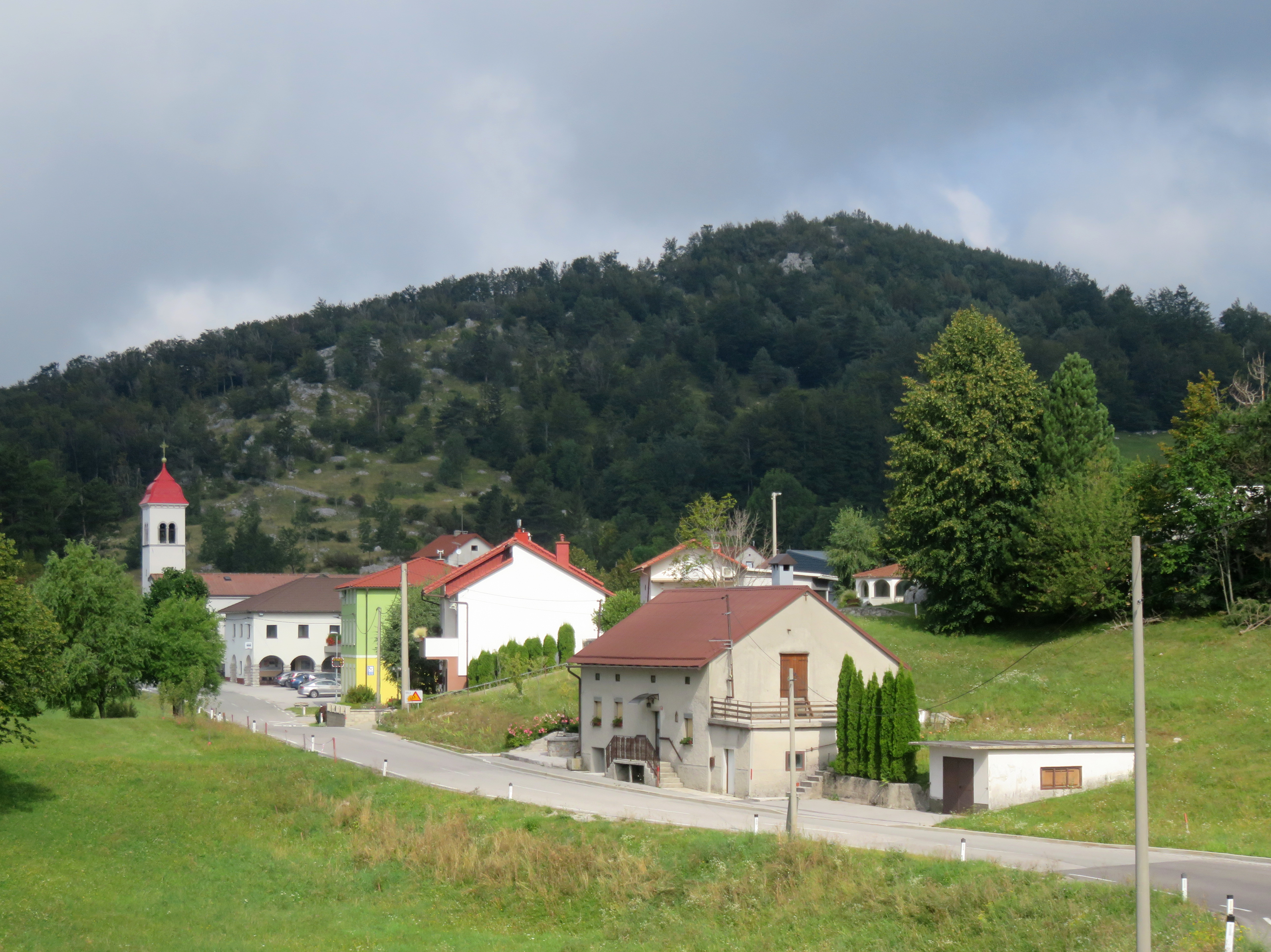

- Location in Slovenia
- Coordinates: 45°55′39.37″N 13°54′36.7″E
- Country: Slovenia
- Traditional region: Littoral
- Statistical region: Gorizia
- Municipality: Ajdovščina

Area
  - Total: 12.17 km^{2} (4.70 sq mi)
- Elevation: 817.8 m (2,683 ft)

Population (2020)
  - Total: 282
  - Density: 23.2/km^{2} (60.0/sq mi)

Otlica (pronounced [ˈoːtlitsa]) is a dispersed settlement in the hills north of Ajdovščina in the Littoral region of Slovenia. It is made up of smaller clusters of the hamlets of Sibirija, Kitajska, Kurja Vas (Slovene: Kurja vas), and Cerkovna, as well as a number of outlying isolated farms.

== Geography ==
Otlica is located on the high Trnovo Forest Plateau (Slovene: Trnovski gozd), overlooking the Vipava Valley. The part of the larger plateau known as the Otlica Plateau (Slovene: Otliška planota) is named after Otlica. Together with the ridge-top villages of Predmeja, Kovk, and Gozd, it is part of an area locally known as Gora (literally, 'the mountain').

== Names ==
The name Otlica is derived from the Slovene adjective otel 'hollow'. It refers to a karst sinkhole about 500 meters (1,600 ft) west of Navrše Hill (elevation 500 meters, 1,600 ft); the bottom of the sinkhole leads to the opposite side of the Gora Ridge through a passage 20 meters (66 ft) high and 15 meters (49 ft) wide that opens above a footpath to Ajdovščina. In folk tradition the mountain was therefore referred to as being hollow. The hamlet of Siberija (literally, 'Siberia') is so named because of its exposure to the frost and the bora wind, and the hamlet of Kitajska (literally, 'China') is a reference to the large number of children that people living there had.

== Church ==
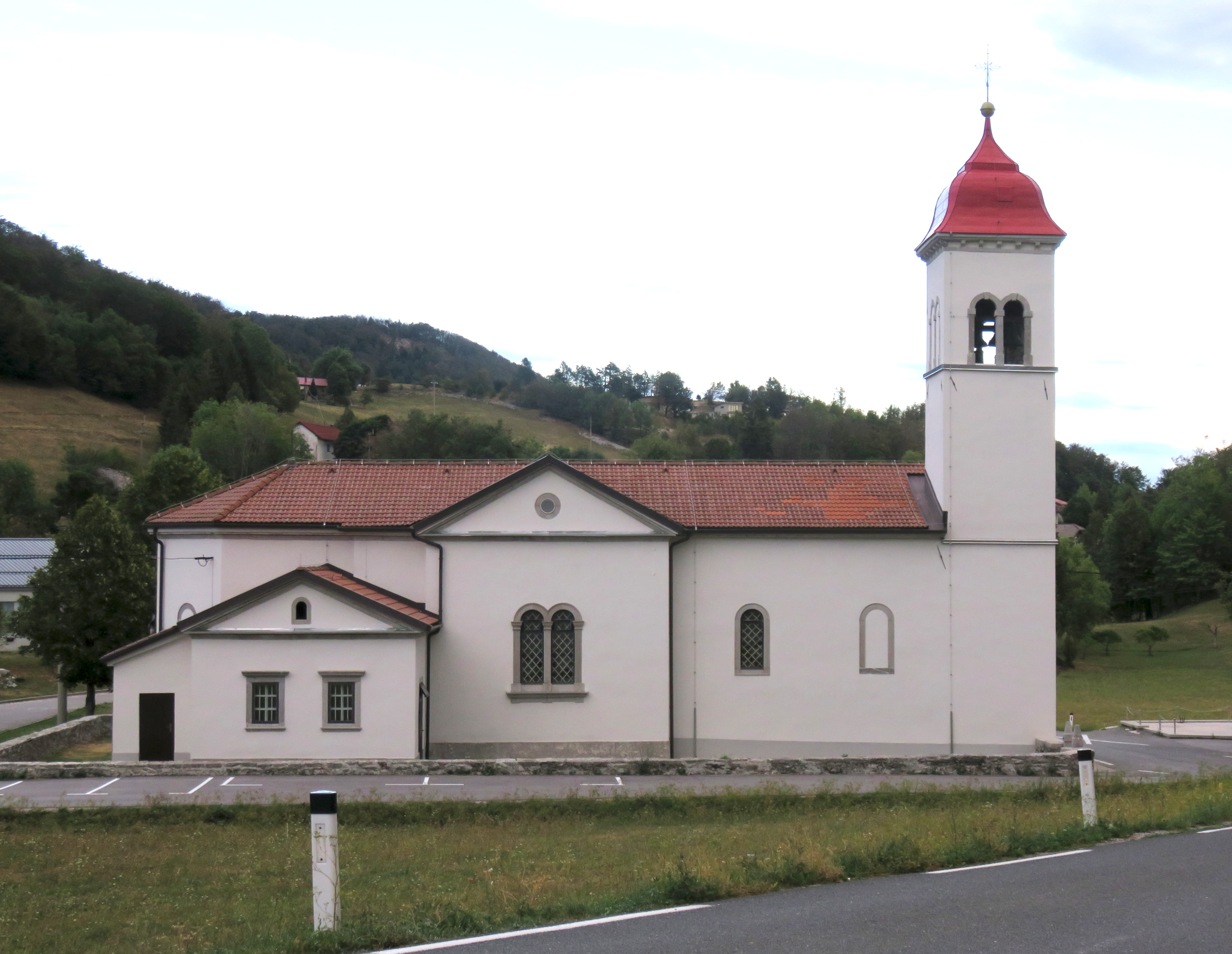
Guardian Angels Church

The parish church in the settlement is dedicated to the Guardian Angels and belongs to the Koper Diocese.
