= Joseph Velikonja =

Slovenian-American geographer (1923–2015)

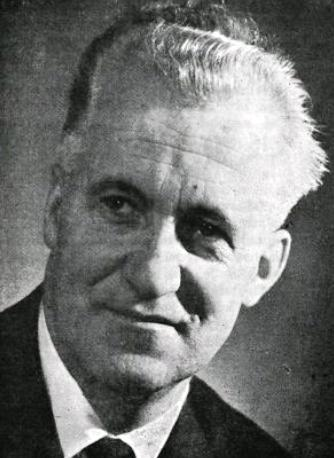
- Born: Jože Velikonja; 23 April 1923; Ljubljana, Kingdom of Yugoslavia
- Died: 23 May 2015 (aged 92); Nova Gorica, Slovenia
- Education: Geography
- Alma mater: University of Chicago
- Occupations: Professor, geographer

Joseph Velikonja (born Jože Velikonja; April 17, 1923 – May 23, 2015) was a Slovene-American geographer and professor.

== Personal life ==
Velikonja was born in Ljubljana, one of 13 children (10 of whom survived childhood) of the writer Narte Velikonja and his wife Ivanka (née Jeglič). While studying in Rome after the Second World War, Velikonja learned his father had been executed after a show trial in Slovenia. Velikonja met his future wife, Matilde (Tilly) Rus, a few years later in Trieste, where she was working as an English teacher. They married in Rome in 1950. He emigrated to the United States in 1955, where he briefly worked as a manual laborer before continuing his academic career. Later in his life, after retirement and extensive travels, he returned to Slovenia. His brother Tine Velikonja (1929–2010) was a surgeon and president of the New Slovene Covenant (Slovene: Nova slovenska zaveza) non-Partisan veterans' organization for many years. Joseph Velikonja died in Nova Gorica, Slovenia on May 23, 2015. He was laid to rest at Žale Central Cemetery in Ljubljana on May 27, 2015.

== Education and career ==
After graduating from high school in Ljubljana, Velikonja was initially interested in forestry and art history. However, he instead studied geography in Rome from 1941 to 1942, then in Ljubljana from 1942 to 1944, and then again in Rome from 1945 to 1948, where he received his doctorate in 1948 with a dissertation on the Vipava Valley. He taught at the Slovene normal school and classical high school in Trieste from 1947 to 1955, where he wrote and published several Slovene textbooks. He also edited a number of geographical works during this period.

After emigrating to the United States in 1955, Velikonja worked for the Cleveland Twist Drill Company. He then continued his studies in Chicago, and taught geography at the University of Chicago in 1958 (while also working for the Chicago Department of City Planning), at Elmhurst College (1958–1959), at Southern Illinois University Carbondale (1959–1964), and then at the University of Washington from 1964 onwards, where he was appointed a full professor in 1979. He delivered guest lectures at the University of Wisconsin–Madison (1961), Yale University (1963–1964), University of Liverpool (1967–1968), University of California (1975), and elsewhere. His research took him to Canada and Europe several times, and he presented his work at various academic congresses from 1961 onward. His professional membership included the Society for Slovene Studies and the Italian Geographical Society, and he won a number of awards for his research. He retired in 1993.

Velikonja's fields of research were political and social geography. He especially studied Slovene immigration to the United States, and he promoted cooperation between researchers in Slovenia and the United States as well as faculty and researcher exchanges. The Joseph Velikonja Undergraduate Prize for works on Slovene studies is named after him. The University of Washington issued the award for the best undergraduate paper on Slovene studies in 2013.

His contributions to the geography program at the University of Washington, particularly the library of materials and maps, are described from his arrival at the University in 1964 until his retirement in 1993.

== Selected works ==
- Ricerche geografiche sulla Valle del Vipacco (A Geographical Study of the Vipava Valley; doctoral dissertation, 1948)
- Zgodovina in zemljepis za osnovne šole (Primary School History and Geography, 1948)
- (editor) Zemljepisni atlas za osnovne šole (Primary School Geographical Atlas, 1948)
- (editor) Luigi Visintin, Zemljepisni atlas za srednje in njim sorodne šole (Geographical Atlas for High Schools and Related Schools, 1948)
- (editor) Luigi Visintin, Zemljevid Slovenije (Map of Slovenia, 1948)
- Zemljepis za višje razrednih srednjih šol (Secondary School Geography for Higher Grades, 1951)
- Zgodovina in zemljepis (History and Geography, 3 vols., 1952)
- Zgodovina in zemljepis: za 3. razred osnovnih šol (History and Geography for the Third Year of Primary School, 1954)
- "Postwar population movements in Europe" (in Annals of the Association of American Geographers, 1958)
- (coauthor) Locational Patterns of Major Industries in the City of Chicago (1960)
- Slovenski profesorji na ameriških univerzah in collegeih (Slovenian Professors at American Universities and Colleges, 1960)
- Italians in the United States (1963)
- Sodobna politična geografija in slovenska politična stvarnost (Contemporary Political Geography and Slovenian Political Reality, 1968)
- Slovenska identiteta v sodobni Evropi (Slovenian Identity in Modern Europe, 1973)
- "Some Geographical Implications of the 'Brain Drain'" (in: Regional Studies, Methods and Analyses, 1974)
- "Yugoslavia-Emigration" (in: Südosteuropa Handbuch, 1975)
- Preface (p. viii) to Slovenes in the United States and Canada: A Bibliography, IHRC Ethic Bibliography No. 3, Immigration History Research, University of Michigan (1981)
- (coauthor) Who's Who of Slovene Descent in the United States (1992)
