= Winterhilfswerk =

Nazi-era German charity

Winter Relief of the German People
- Winterhilfswerk des Deutschen Volkes
- Abbreviation: WHW
- Formation: 1933; 93 years ago
- Founded at: Berlin
- Dissolved: May 9, 1945; 81 years ago
- Type: Welfare organization
- Location: Nazi Germany
- Region served: Germany
- Services: Food, clothing and fuel distribution
- Leader: Erich Hilgenfeldt
- Parent organization: National Socialist People's Welfare
- Funding: Public contributions

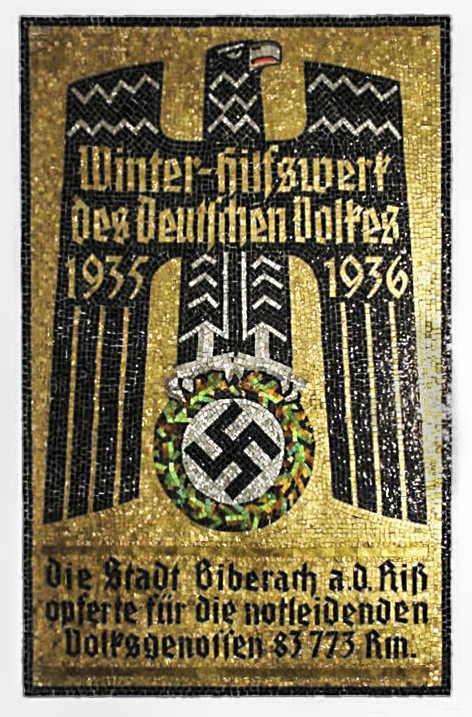
Mosaic from the Braith-Mali-Museum in Biberach an der Riß

The Winterhilfswerk des Deutschen Volkes (English: Winter Relief of the German People), commonly known by its abbreviated form Winterhilfswerk (WHW), was an annual donation drive by the National Socialist People's Welfare (German: Nationalsozialistische Volkswohlfahrt, or NSV).

Established in 1933, the WHW was a major source of funding for the activities of the NSV and the second largest mass organisation in Nazi Germany. Donations were theoretically voluntary but de facto required of German citizens, with high levels of social pressure to contribute.

WHW replaced tax-funded welfare institutions, freeing up money for rearmament. It also had a propaganda role: encouraging solidarity of the Volksgemeinschaft. Persistent rumours that the WHW was a sham, with the proceeds spent on armaments, were at least partially confirmed by Martin Bormann who responded to questions from the Nazi Party treasurer by stating that the money raised by WHW was controlled and allocated by Adolf Hitler alone.

== Background and early history ==
The Winterhilfswerk was organised by the National Socialist People's Welfare, a social welfare organisation whose declared purpose was "to develop and promote the living, healthy forces of the German people". (Note: "die lebendigen, gesunden Kräfte des deutschen Volkes zu entfalten und zu fördern". Störmer, Hellmuth: Das rechtliche Verhältnis der NS-Volkswohlfahrt und des Winterhilfswerkes zu den Betreuten im Vergleiche zur öffentlichen Wohlfahrtspflege, 1940, p. 52f.) The NSV's origins can be traced to Nazi party welfare activities during the Kampfzeit, when local groups were formed to provide aid to party members in distress.

The Berlin association "Nationalsozialistische Volkswohlfahrt e.V." is considered the primary institutional ancestor of the NSV, although initially, this organisation was met with contempt by Nazi Party leaders. In 1932 the party informed the association's leadership that it had initiated legal proceedings because of "misuse of the word 'national socialist'". (Note: "gegen den Mißbrauch des Wortes 'nationalsozialistisch' durch die Vereinsführung die nötigen rechtlichen Maßnahmen eingeleitet".) In 1933, the party changed its position; Hitler designated the NSV a party organ on 3 May 1933. It went on to grow rapidly, counting 3.7 million members in 1934 and becoming the second largest mass organisation in Nazi Germany, behind the German Labour Front. At the onset of the Second World War, it had more than 10 million members.

Hitler ordered the establishment of the Winterhilfswerk in 1933 and personally opened the first drive, giving out the directive "no one shall be hungry, no one shall freeze". (Note: "keiner soll hungern, keiner soll frieren".) The initial donation drive in winter 1933/1934 took place against a backdrop of acute distress in large parts of the German populace; its initiation was partly a result of the party's desire to prevent social unrest. The "Law on the Winterhilfswerk of the German People", (Note: "Gesetz über das Winterhilfswerk des Deutschen Volkes") passed on 1 December 1936, formally established the WHW as a registered association, to be led by the Reich Minister of Public Enlightenment and Propaganda.

== Operation ==
The yearly donation drives by the Winterhilfswerk constituted the most visible part of the NSV's work. As part of the centralisation of Nazi Germany, posters urged people to donate, rather than give directly to beggars. The Hitlerjugend and Bund Deutscher Mädel (boys' and girls' associations, respectively) were extremely active in collecting for this charity. As part of the effort to place the community over the individual, totals were not reported for any individuals, only what the branch raised.

Certain weekends were assigned to all of the different Nazi associations, each with their own special Abzeichen, or badges, to pass out in exchange for a pfennig or two. The collectible items were made of many different materials, such as wood, glass, paper, terra cotta, metal and plastic. Over 8,000 different pieces had been produced by the end of the war, and some of the rarer ones sell for quite a lot of money today.

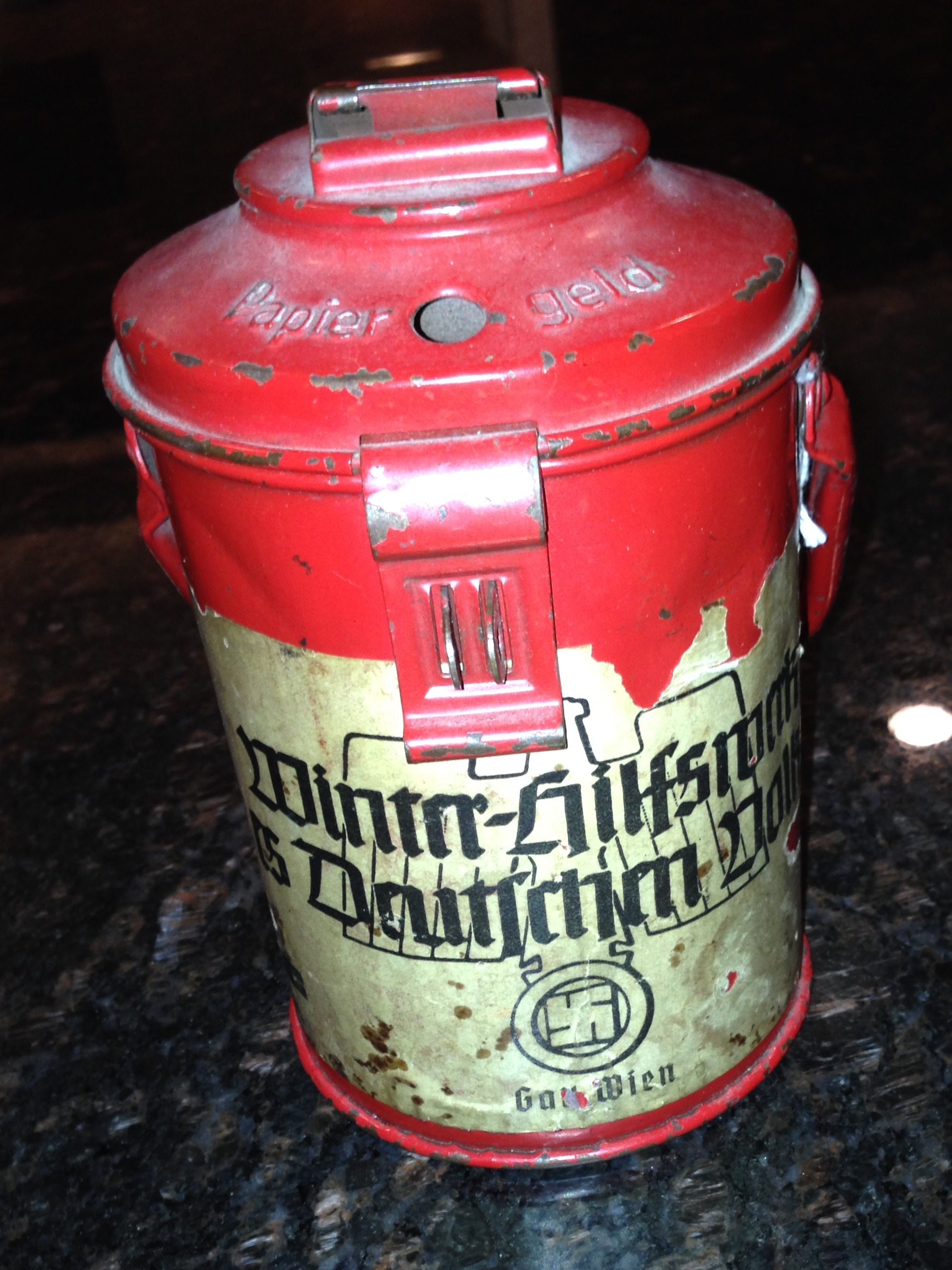
A collection tin from the Winterhilfswerk

The Can Rattlers, as they became known, were relentless in their pursuit of making sure every good German citizen gave their share to the WHW. In fact, those who forgot to give had their names put in the paper to remind them of their neglect. Neighbors and even family members were encouraged to whisper the names of shirkers to their block leaders so that they could persuade them to do their duty. On one occasion, a civil servant was prosecuted for failure to donate, and his argument that it was voluntary was dismissed on the grounds it was an extreme view of liberty to neglect all duties that were not actually prescribed by law and therefore an abuse of liberty. It was not unheard of for workers to lose their jobs for not donating to Winterhilfe or not giving enough. For instance, when a worker was fired for not donating to Winterhilfe, the firing was upheld by a labour court on the grounds that it was "conduct hostile to the community of the people ... to be most strongly condemned".

Large donations were also a means to establish oneself as a loyal supporter of the Nazi Party without the commitment of joining it.

A greatly encouraged practice was once a month to have a one-pot meal (eintopf), reducing all the food to one course and the money thus saved was to be donated. During autumn and winter months from 1933 onward, the Eintopfsonntag (One-Pot Sunday or Stew Sunday) was officially scheduled by the WHW. Restaurants were required to offer an eintopf meal at one of several price points. Households were reminded of the occasion, although it has been noted that the authorities did not investigate whether the one-pot meal was actually served.

Collection drives were a mainstay of the Winter Relief and those who did not give, or gave little (such as one pair of boots to a clothing drive), were sometimes the victims of mob violence and needed to be protected by the police, known in French as the Secours d'Hiver in Belgium.

=== Gifts and tokens ===
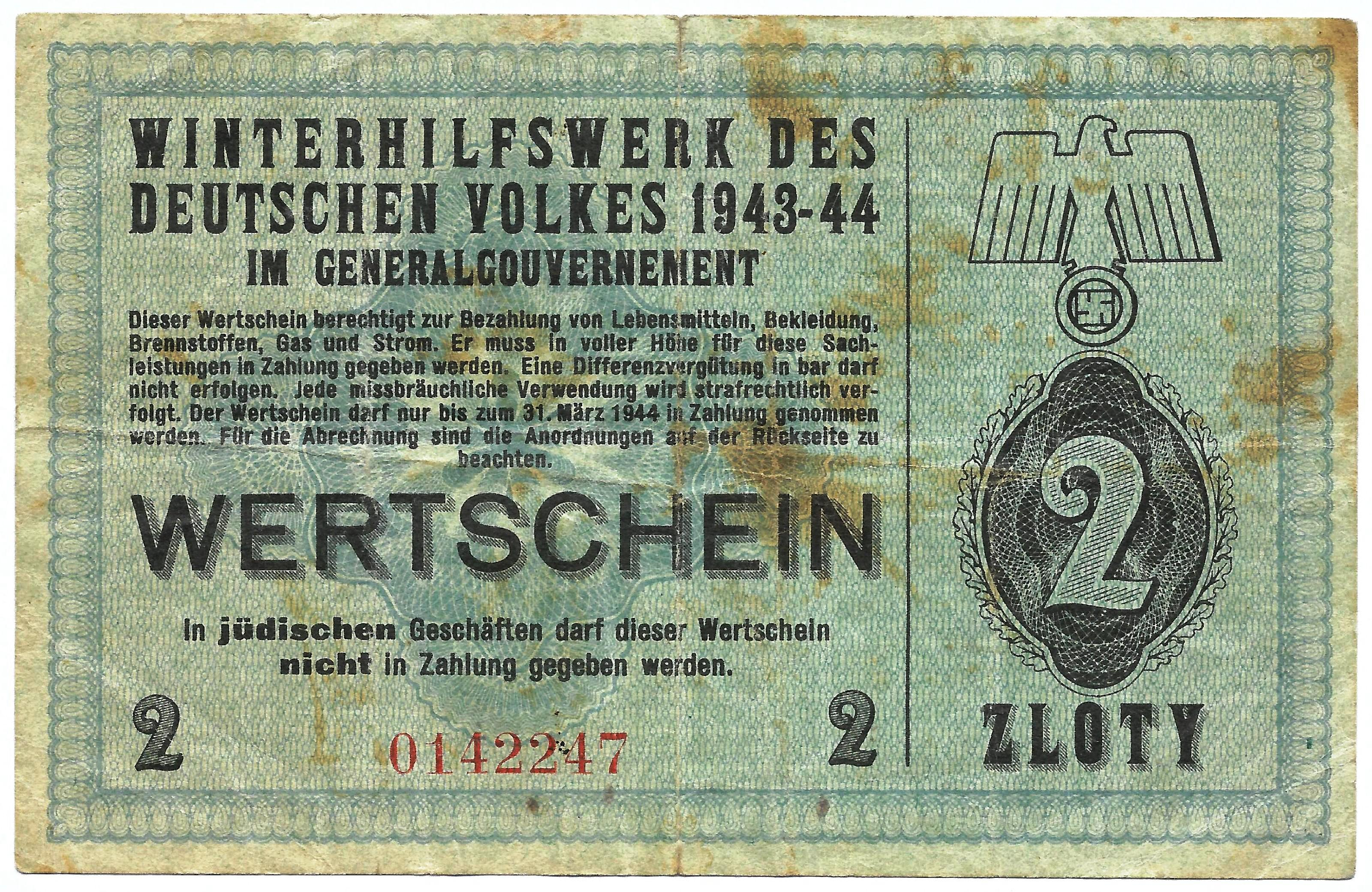
1943 Winterhilfswerk note: GG issue with antisemitic clause

A paper Monatstürplakette (monthly placard) was issued to place on one's door or in one's window to show others that one had given and also to keep the roaming bands of charity workers at bay.

Donors were often given small souvenir gratitude gifts of negligible value, somewhat similar to the way modern charities mail out address labels and holiday cards. A typical such gift was a very small propaganda booklet, reminiscent of Victorian-era miniature books; about 0.8" wide x 1.5" tall. Booklets included The Führer Makes History, a collection of Hitler photographs, and Gerhard Koeppen and other decorated heroes of the war.

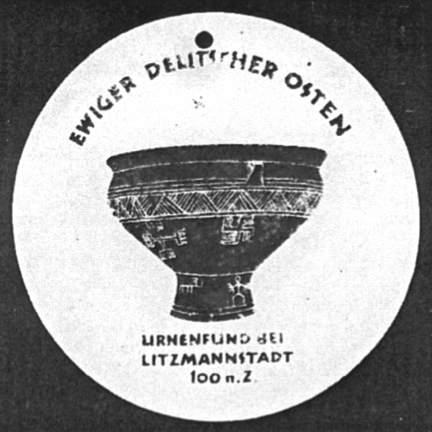
Ceramic medallion issued in the WHW collection drive (Gausammlung) of winter 1942–1943 as they were themed with individual Reichsgauen, in this case Wartheland

More generous donors would receive concomitantly better gifts, such as lapel pins on a wide variety of themes. Some depicting occupational types or geographic areas of the Reich, others animals, birds and insects, nursery rhyme and fairy tale characters, or notable persons from German history (including Hitler himself). They were made from a variety of materials. Each individual miniature book, badge, badge set or toy set was only available for two or three days of a particular collection drive. The populace would be encouraged to donate the following week and thereby collect the latest in the series. There could also be consequences such as nagging by the appropriate official if a local Blockleiter saw that someone was not wearing the current, appropriate pin by about Tuesday of the week.

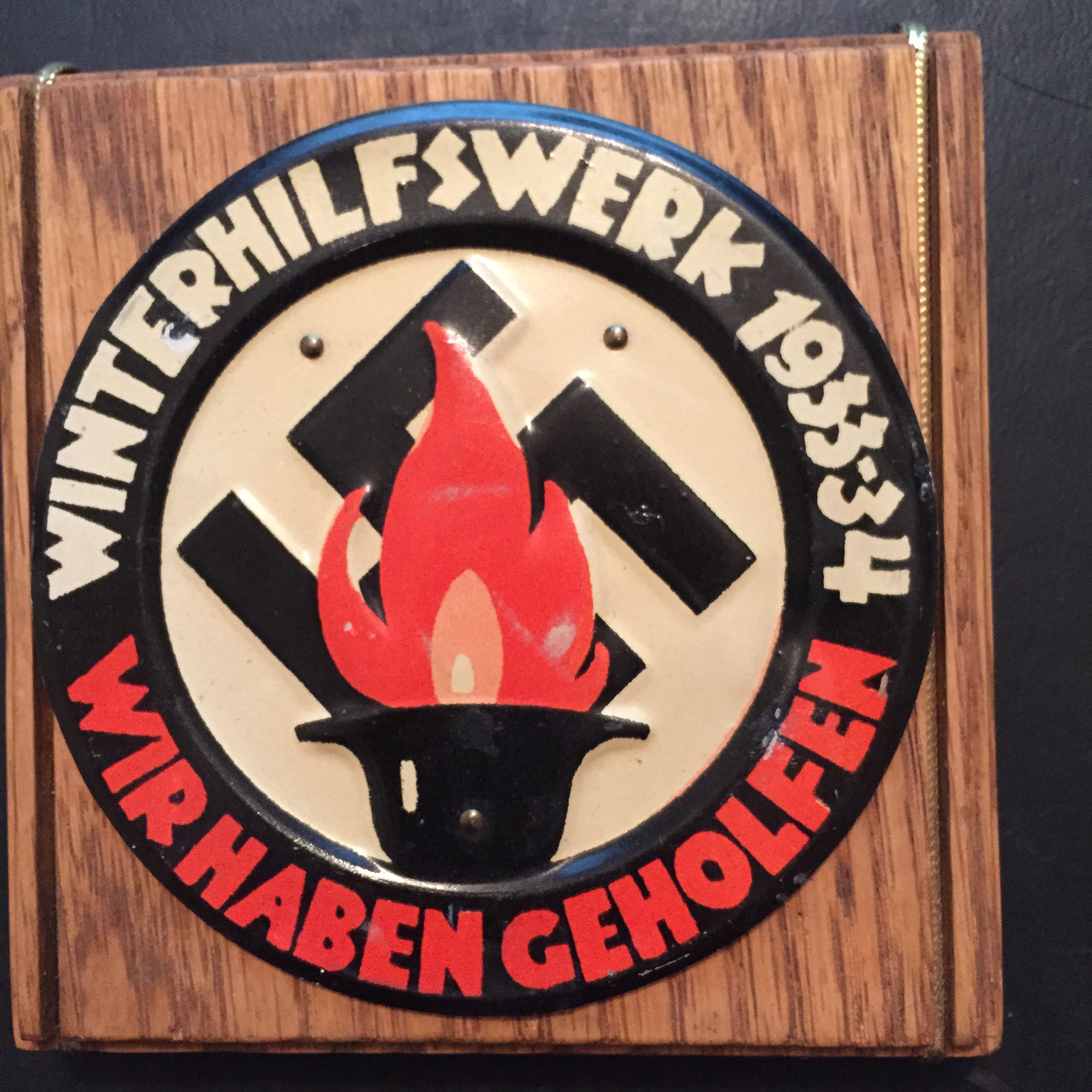
The Winterhilfswerk Donation recognition display pictured is a tin plate about 3" in diameter mounted on oak.

When he visited Germany in 1939 as a reporter for the North American Newspaper Alliance, Lothrop Stoddard wrote:

Once a fortnight, every city, town, and village in the Reich seethes with brown-shirted Storm Troopers carrying red-painted canisters. These are the Winter-Help collection-boxes. The Brown-Shirts go everywhere. You cannot sit in a restaurant or beer-hall but what, sooner or later, a pair of them will work through the place, rattling their canisters ostentatiously in the faces of customers. And I never saw a German formally refuse to drop in his mite, even though the contribution might have been less than the equivalent of one American cent.

During these periodic money-raising campaigns, all sorts of dodges are employed. On busy street-corners comedians, singers, musicians, sailors, gather a crowd by some amusing skit, at the close of which the Brown-Shirts collect. People buy tiny badges to show they have contributed—badges good only for that particular campaign. One time they may be an artificial flower; next time a miniature dagger, and so forth. The Winter-Help campaign series reaches its climax shortly before Christmas in the so-called Day of National Solidarity. On that notable occasion the Big Guns of the Nazi Party sally forth with their collection-boxes to do their bit.

The 1933–1945 collection drives issued a large number of themed ceramic medallions and other badges given to donators. (Note: Collections: Rainer Baumann (1973). WHW Abzeichen der Reichsstrassen-Sammlung 1933–1944.; Harry Rosenberg (1974). Spenden-Abzeichen des WHW.; Gerhard Janaczek (1982). WHW Abzeichen Strassensammlungen.; Holger Rosenberg (1983). Spendenbelege des WHW und KWHW 1933–1945: Überregionale.; Holger Rosenberg (1987). Spendenbelege des WHW und KWHW 1933–1945: Gausammlungen Gau 1–Gau 10.; Reinhard Tieste (1990). Spendenbelege des WHW und KWHW 1933–1945: Gausammlungen Gau 11–Gau 20.; Reinhard Tieste (1993). Spendenbelege des WHW, Band IV: Gausammlungen 1933–1945 Gaue 21–30.; Reinhard Tieste (1993). Spendenbelege des WHW, Band V: Gausammlungen 1933–1945 Gaue 31–40.)

== Use of funds ==
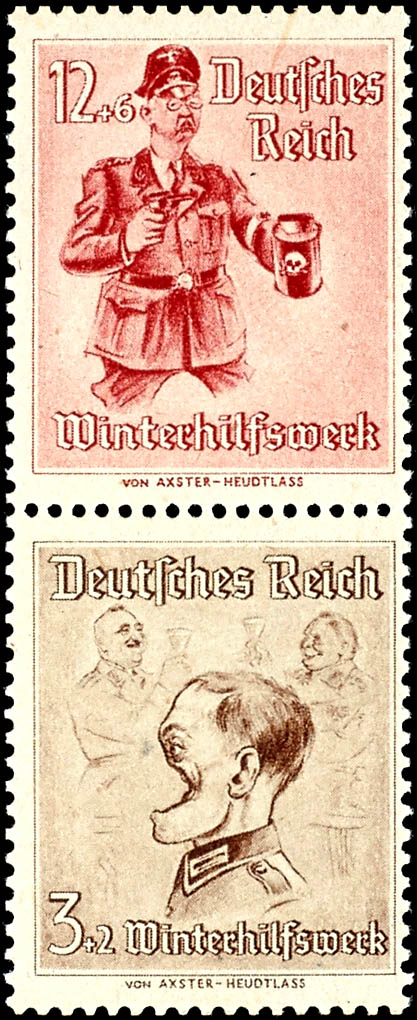
British forged stamps mocking the Winterhilfswerk: Heinrich Himmler with collection box, and a soldier with his face blown off.

A 1938 Nazi propaganda leaflet claimed that the Winterhilfswerk had collected nearly a billion Reichsmarks from 1933 to 1937 as well as half a billion in goods and two million kilograms of coal.

However, in 1937 a group of exiled German economists writing under the pseudonym 'Germanicus' produced figures comparing the Winterhilfswerk of 1933 with the pre-existing Reich Winter Help of 1931. The figures showed that the Winterhilfswerk provided slightly more coal and potatoes to the needy, but dramatically less bread and meat. They also pointed out that the Reich Winter Help was supplemented by the relief efforts of the states and private organisations, but this help had ceased under the Nazis.

American racialist author Lothrop Stoddard, who visited Nazi Germany in 1939, described visits to a Winterhilfswerk facility where he was shown winter clothing and other items meant for distribution. Others describe the charitable aims of the Winterhilfswerk and details on the collection of money and goods, but little about what was done with either.

American diplomat William Russell's eyewitness book Berlin Embassy pointed out that no account was ever made of where the huge amounts raised by Winterhilfswerk were spent. His contention was not only that the program was a sham and that all the proceeds were used to produce armaments, but that the entire German population knew this to be the case. Similarly, the Gestapo reported persistent rumours that Winterhilfswerk funds were used for Nazi party and military purposes.

Further, in 1936, Nazi Party treasurer Franz Xaver Schwarz commented to Deputy Führer Rudolf Hess "It has repeatedly become necessary for the Führer to use WHW funds for other purposes." In 1941, after complaining that large amounts of WHW and NSV funds were being siphoned off without his agreement, Schwarz was told by the Chief of the Nazi Party Chancellery, Martin Bormann, that Adolf Hitler alone controlled and allocated the money.

== See also ==
- Nazism in Chile
