= History of women in Germany =

German history

The history of German women covers gender roles, personalities and movements from the Middle Ages to the present in German-speaking lands.

== Medieval ==
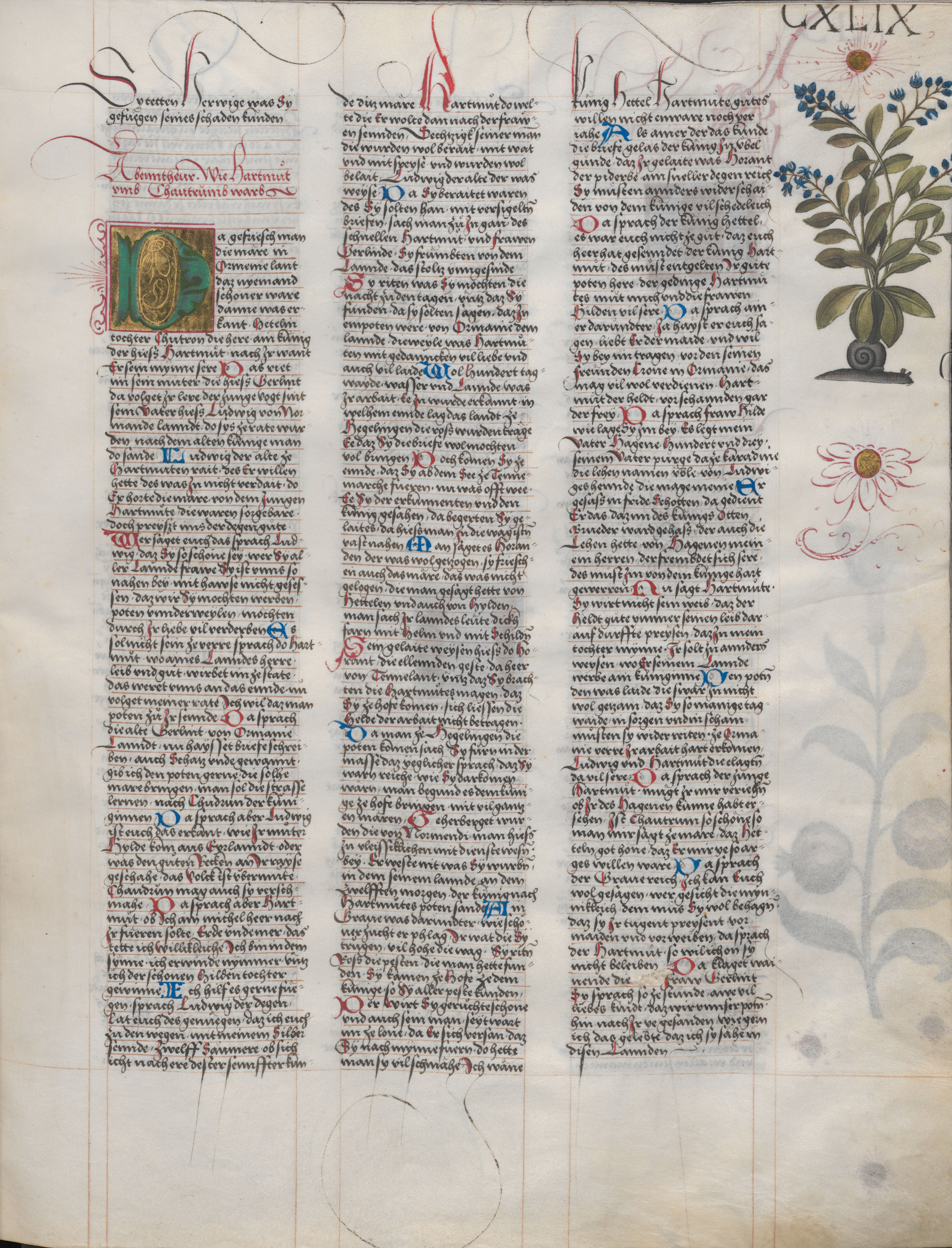
Ambraser Heldenbuch, Fol. 149. Kudrun. The early sixteenth century epic collection Ambraser Heldenbuch, one of the most important works of medieval German literature, focuses largely on female characters (with notable texts being its versions of the Nibelungenlied, the Kudrun and the poem Nibelungenklage) and defends the concept of Frauenehre (female honour) against the increasing misogyny of the time. The work was written by the tax collector Hans Ried in Bolzano for emperor Maximilian I.

The Ottonian queens and empresses (including Matilda of Ringelheim, Adelaide of Italy, Theophanu, Cunigunde of Luxembourg) were among the most powerful women of the entire Middle Age. The Salian empresses, although not as visible (due to certain circumstances), were also powerful. The most notable and talented was perhaps Gisela of Swabia. Abbesses, especially those of Imperial abbeys wielded tremendous power, with influence encompassing spiritual, economic, political and intellectual realms. Matilda of Quedlinburg and Matilda of Quedlinburg were notable examples. Matilda of Quedlinburg formed a triad of regents with Adelaide of Italy and Theophanu in Otto III's reign when Matilda of Essen wielded great political power while being one of the most prominent patrons of arts of the time as well. The following centuries witnessed women who were not only patrons but artists and writers themselves.

Hrotsvitha, Gerberga II, Abbess of Gandersheim, Ava, Hildegard of Bingen, Elisabeth of Schönau, Herrad of Landsberg, Mechthild of Magdeburg, Mechthild of Hackeborn, Gertrude the Great, and Argula von Grumbach were among the most accomplished female writers of the entire Middle Age. They pursued fields as diverse as medicine, music composition, religious writing, and government and military politics, with the prime example being the polymath Hildegard von Bingen, who has been praised as "the greatest mystic ever" and one of "the greatest intellectuals of the West". Through sources like the Annals of Quedlinburg (the chief source on Ottonian history, presided over by the abbess Adelheid and likely written by female scribes), female intellectuals left their accounts of German and European history. Ava, the first German woman poet, was also the author of the first German epic and the first woman to write in a European vernacular.

Salic (Frankish) law, which was applied in many regions, placed women at a disadvantage with regard to property and inheritance rights. Germanic widows required a male guardian to represent them in court. Unlike Anglo-Saxon law or the Visigothic Code, Salic law barred women and descendants from (only) female lines from royal succession.

The imperial dignity was elective. In the beginning, imperial succession was not strictly regulated. In the case of Empress Theophanu, it was expected that she would have become emperor had Otto II had no sons. In many cases, the imperial throne came to descendants from a female line, such as the Salians who were descendants of Otto the Great through the female line; Frederick Barbarossa who descended from the Salian through his grandmother Agnes of Waiblingen and had connection with the Hohenstaufen's powerful rival family, the Welfs, through his mother Judith of Welf; Albert II, who was the son-in-law and heir of Emperor Sigismund, the last male Luxembourg through his marriage with Elizabeth of Luxembourg. When the imperial throne became practically hereditary under the Habsburgs in the Early Modern period, the effort to make the princess Maria Theresa his heir by Emperor Charles VI met with many difficulties. While most European governments recognized his Pragmatic Sanction (that would allow female right of succession), in practice, Maria Theresa's inheritance was still contested. In the end, she gained the Hungarian, Bohemia and Austrian thrones while the elective imperial office went to her husband Francis.

The status of women in general varied, depending on the period. Jestice and Görich write that Ottonian sources reveal no misogyny and basically the society recognized the roles and abilities (except physical strength) of women, thus the commonly deemed special status of empresses and queens actually did not stand out in this context. According to Sagarra, social status was based on military and biological roles, a reality demonstrated in rituals associated with newborns, when female infants were given a lesser value than male infants. The use of physical force against wives was condoned until the 18th century in Bavarian law.

The early sixteenth century epic collection Ambraser Heldenbuch, one of the most important works of medieval German literature, focuses largely on female characters (with notable texts being its versions of the Nibelungenlied, the Kudrun and the poem Nibelungenklage) and defends the concept of Frauenehre (female honour) against the increasing misogyny of the time. The work was written by the tax collector Hans Ried in Bolzano for emperor Maximilian I.

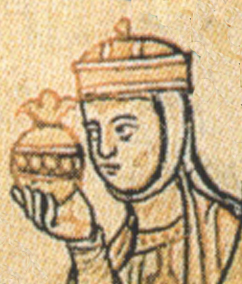
Matilda of Ringelheim, the first Ottonian queen

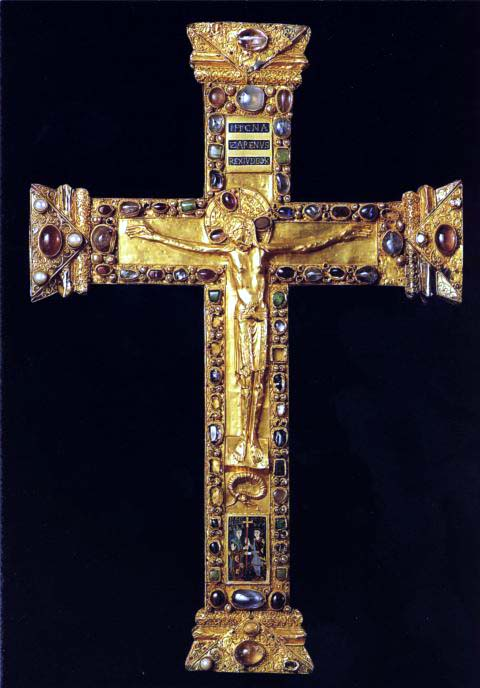
Cross of Otto and Mathilde, commissioned by Mathilde, Abbess of Essen, a powerful kingmaker of the Ottonian time

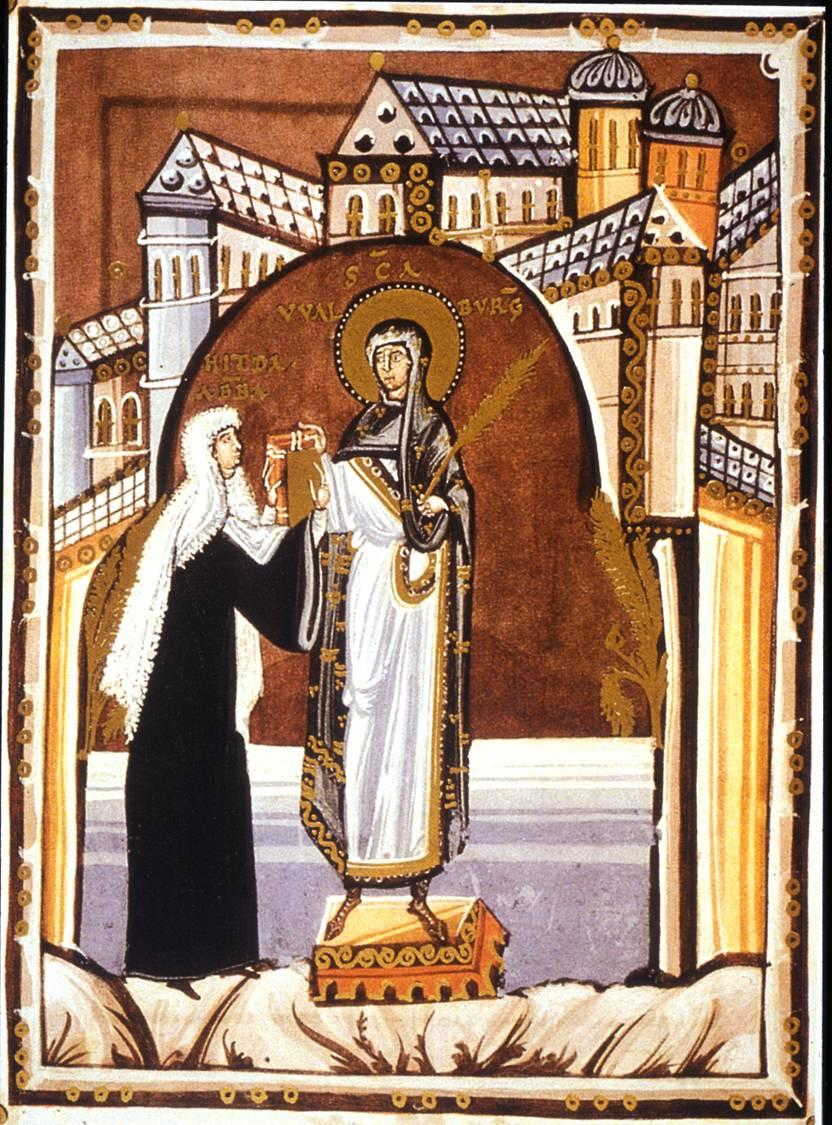
The eleventh century Hitda Codex, commissioned by Hitda, abbess of Meschede

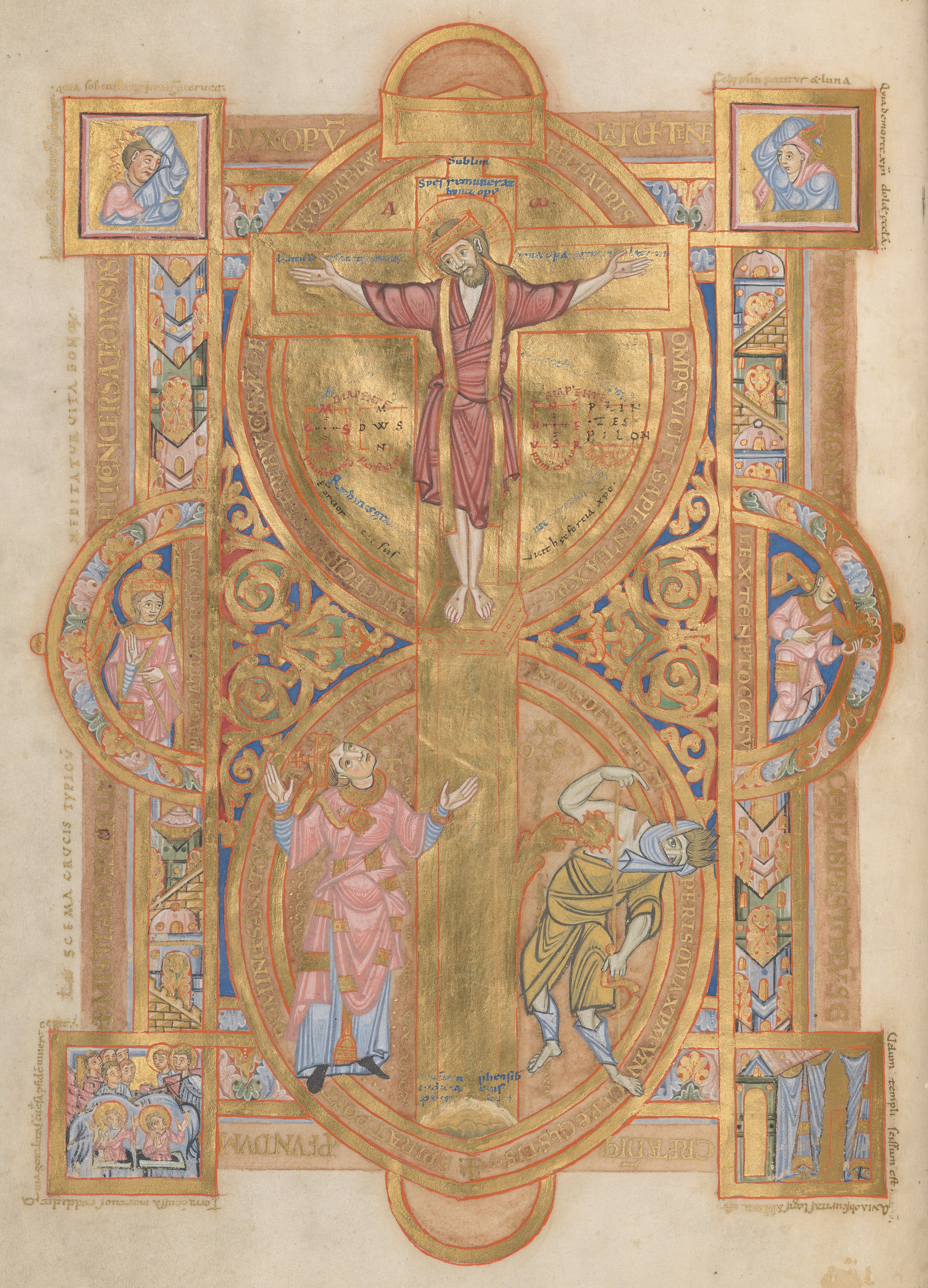
Uta Codex, commissioned by Abbess Uta von Niedermünster

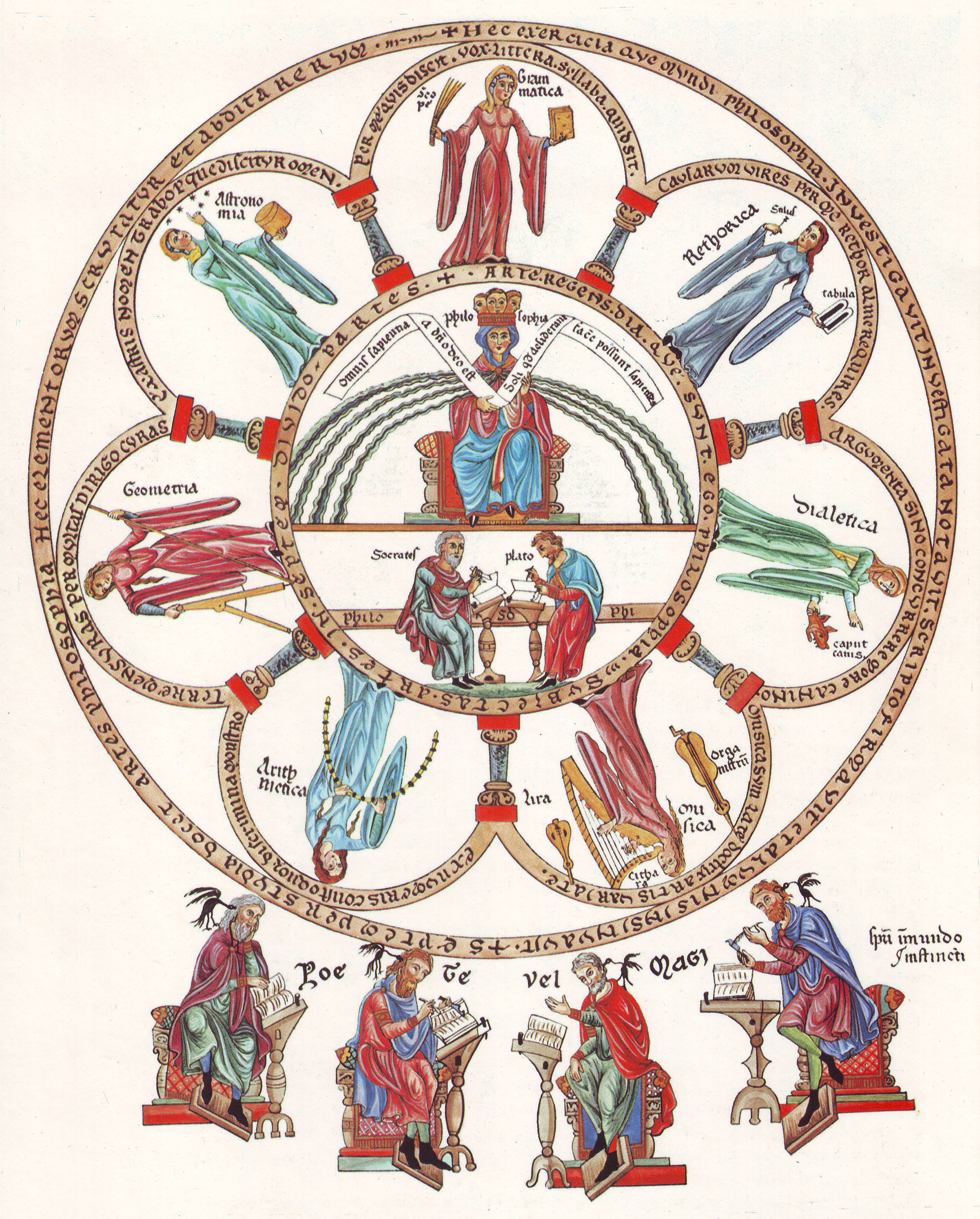
Hortus deliciarum, presided over by Herrad of Landsberg

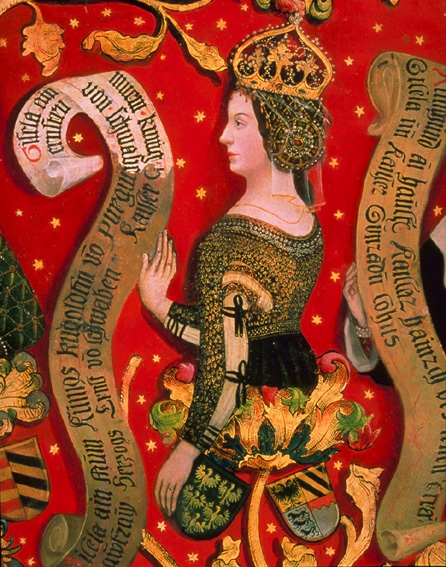
Gisela of Swabia, Salian empress

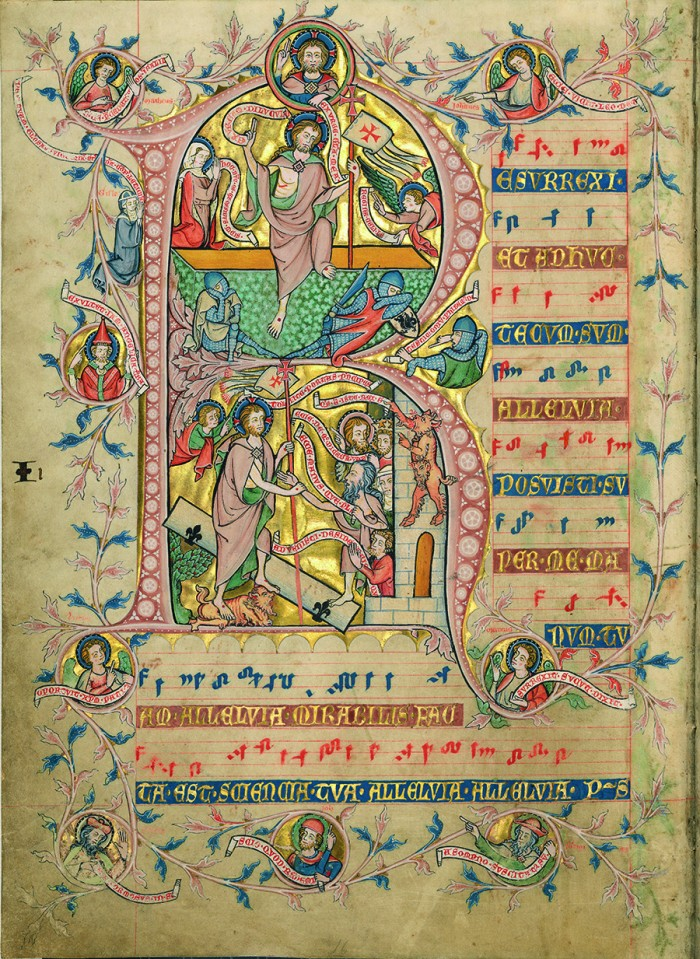
Codex Gisle, created by the artist Gisela of Kerzenbroeck

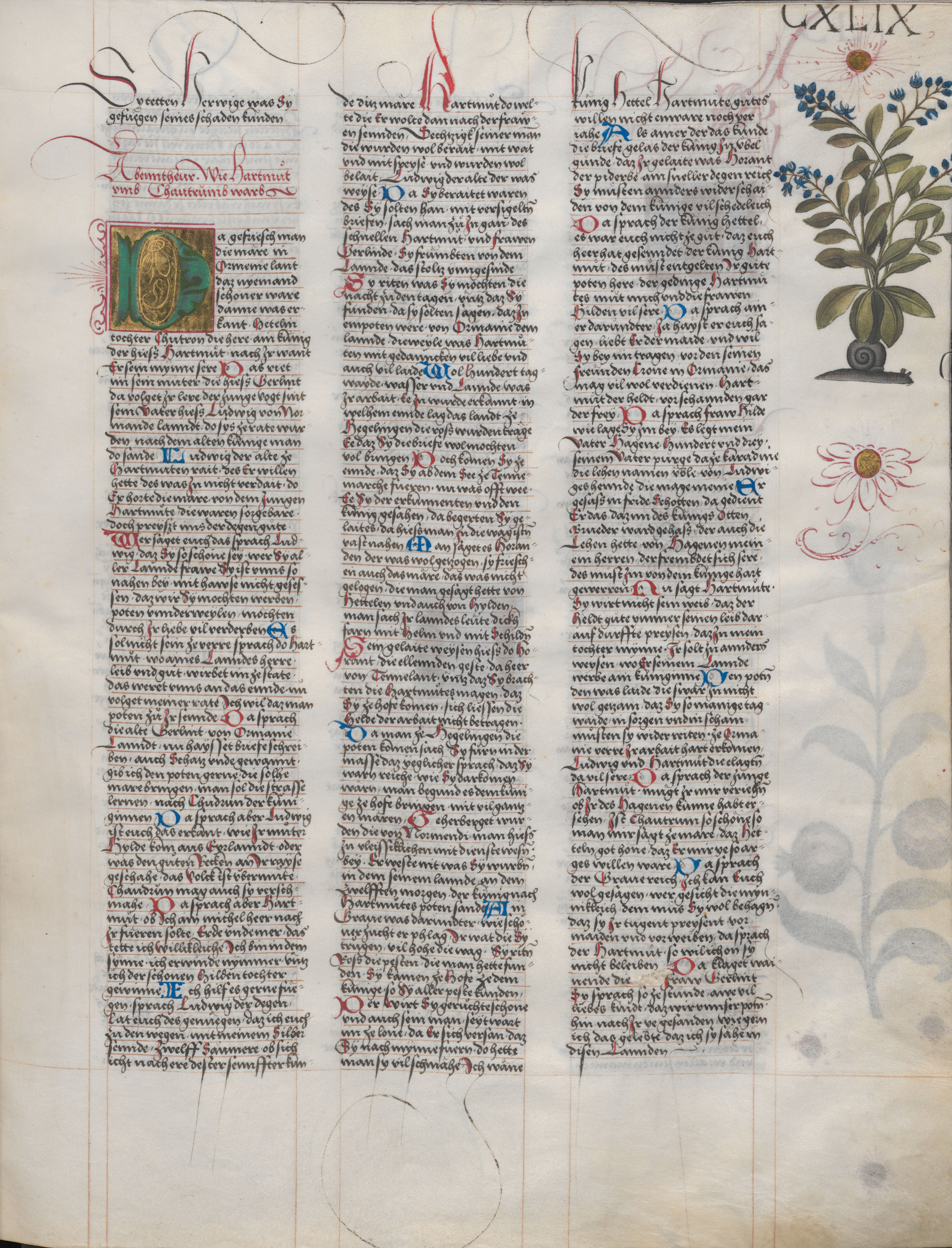
Ambraser Heldenbuch, Fol. 149. Kudrun

== Early modern era ==
Before the 19th century, young women lived under the economic and disciplinary authority of their fathers until they married and passed under the control of their husbands. In order to secure a satisfactory marriage, a woman needed to bring a substantial dowry. In the wealthier families, daughters received their dowry from their families, whereas the poorer women needed to work in order to save their wages so as to improve their chances to wed. Under German laws, women had property rights over their dowries and inheritances, a valuable benefit as high mortality rates resulted in successive marriages. Before 1789, the majority of women lived confined to society's private sphere, the home. Sagarra notes that The Age of Reason did not bring much more for women: men, including Enlightenment aficionados, believed that women were naturally destined to be principally wives and mothers. Within the educated classes, there was the belief that women needed to be sufficiently educated to be intelligent and agreeable interlocutors to their husbands. However, the lower-class women were expected to be economically productive in order to help their husbands make ends meet. The closure of monasteries by the Protestant Reformation, as well as the closure of other hospitals and charitable institutions, forced numerous women into marriage. While priests' concubines had previously received some degree of social acceptance, marriage did not necessarily remove the stigma of concubinage, nor could a wife claim the wage to which a female servant might be entitled. Marriages to Protestant clerics became a means for urban bourgeois families to establish their commitment to the Reformation.

According to Kay Goodman, feminist scholars trace the beginning of German female literature (which paved the way for nineteenth-century feminism) to the era of Romanticism (eighteenth century). Dorothea Erxleben, the first German woman doctor, challenged the social restrictions on the role of women, that defined them only as wives, mothers and caretakers.

There was a large number of female territorial regents between the sixteenth and the eighteenth centuries. By the eighteenth century, generally elite women could only attain political power (such as Maria Theresa or Maria Antonia of Saxony; Catherine the Great was ethnically German but attained political power in Russia) in the name of their husbands and sons. Empress Eleonore Magdalene of Neuburg was one of the most powerful Habsburg imperial consorts.

The process of elimination of gender guardianship was a complex process, that primarily benefited businesswomen. Some of the most notable German businesswomen of this period included Glückel of Hameln, Anna Vandenhoeck, Karoline Kaulla, Aletta Haniel, Helene Amalie Krupp.

Katharina Henot, possibly the first German postmistress, was executed as an alleged witch in the midst of a legal battle between her family and the House of Thurn und Taxis. The position of Imperial Postmaster became hereditary through the female line in 1621 under Ferdinand II, Holy Roman Emperor (it became hereditary through the male line in 1615). In 1628, Alexandrine von Taxis, née de Rye, became Imperial Postmaster.

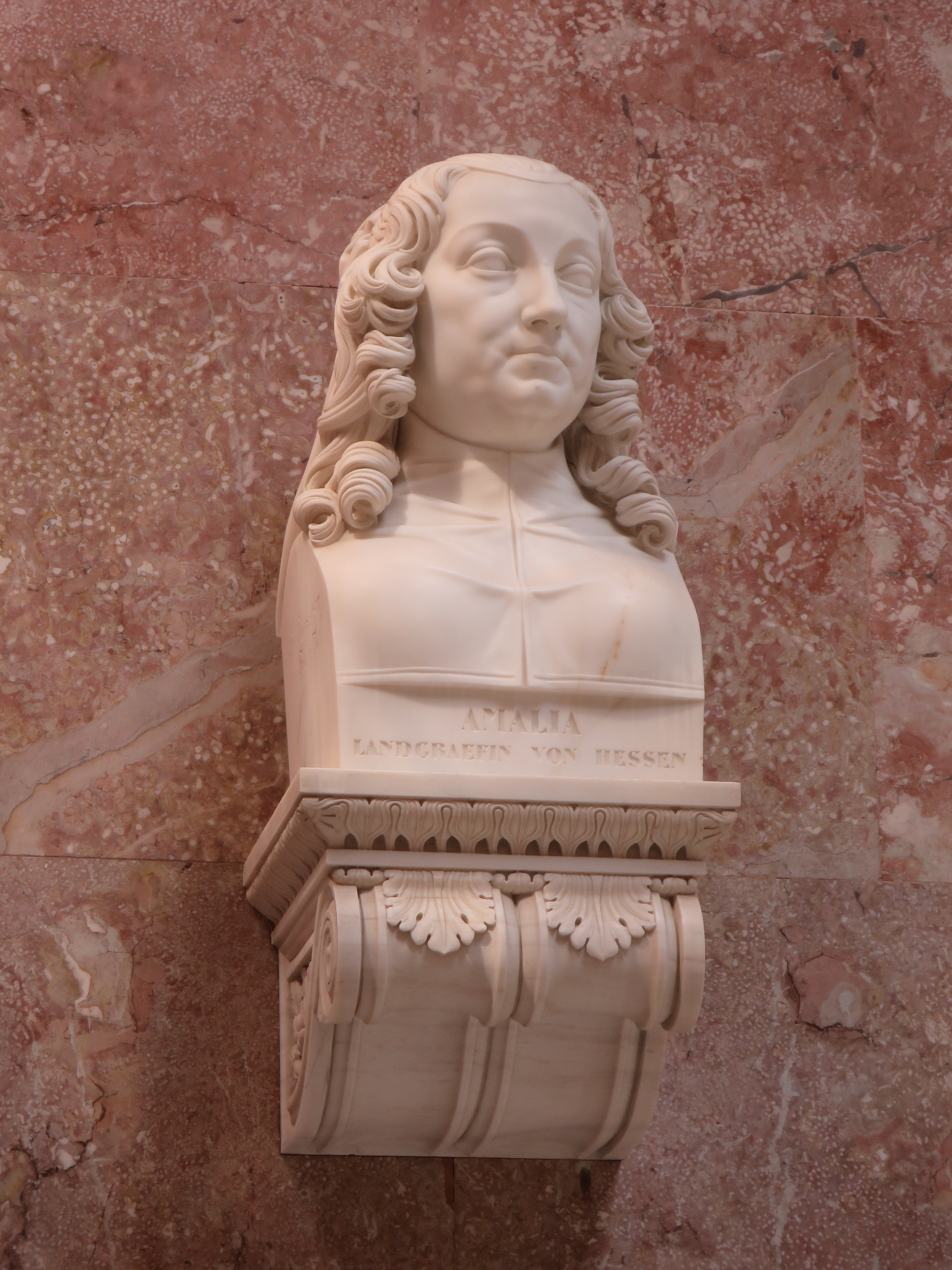
Bust of Amalie of Hesse-Kassel in the Walhalla. She was one of the three original enshrinees of this temple alongside Maria Theresa and Catherine the Great. There are now six.

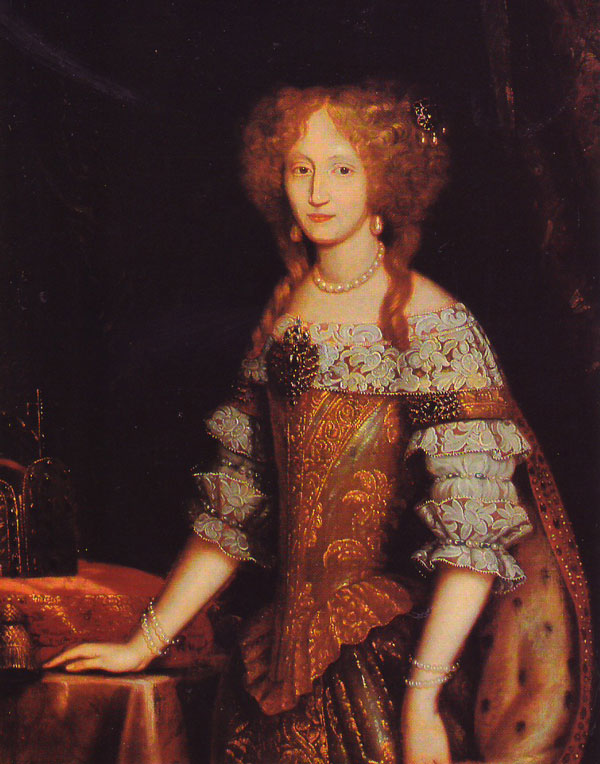
Empress Eleonore Magdalene of Neuburg

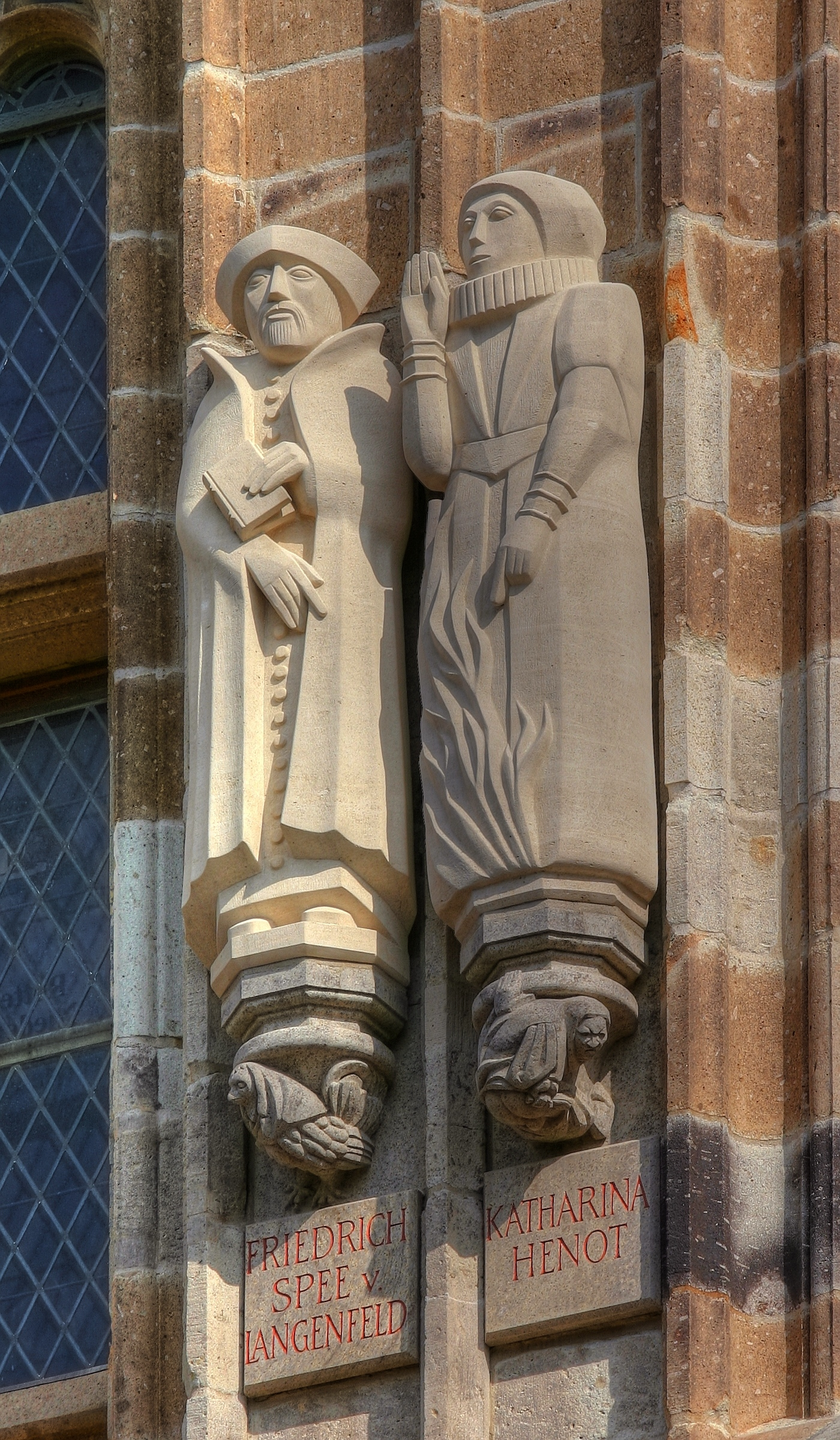
Katharina Henot (right), probably the first German postmistress, prominent witch-hunting victim. The man depicted is Friedrich Speevon Langenfel. The deaths of Henot and other innocent victims inspired him to write his work Cautio Criminalis.

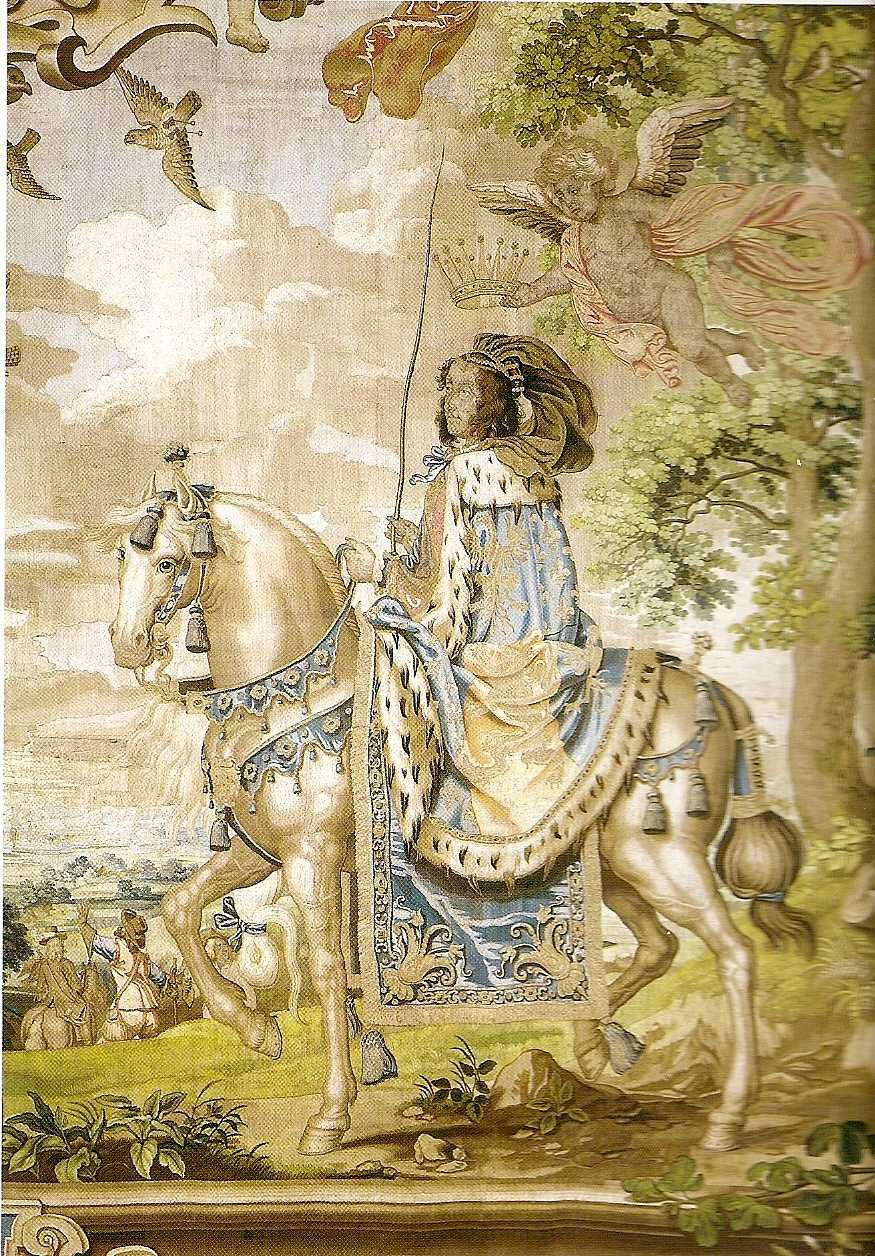
Alexandrine von Taxis, imperial postmaster

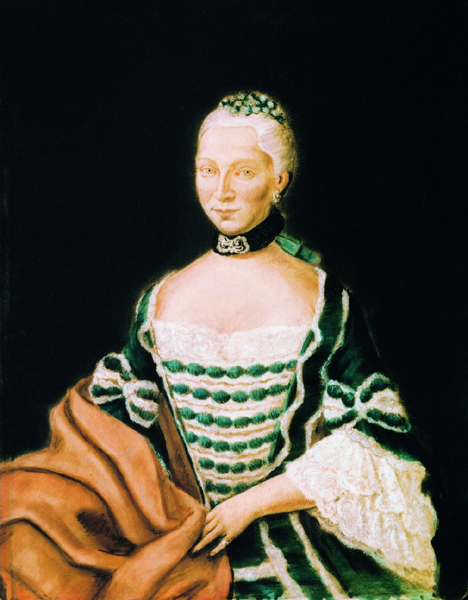
Aletta Haniel, prominent trade and transport magnate

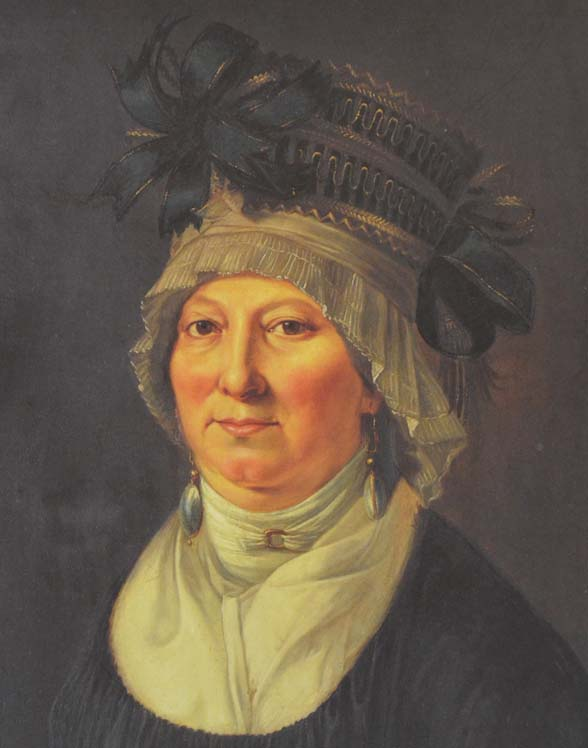
Karoline Kaulla, one of the most prominent Court Jews of her time

== 19th century to early 20th century ==
=== Elite women ===
The most notable women associated with the Romantic movement was the composer, illustrator and writer Bettina von Arnim and the poet Karoline von Günderrode, who formed a homosocial network between female intellectuals.

In the nineteenth century, the literary salons (generally presided over by women) played a great role in civilizing society. Right under the shadow of Bismarck, the salonists Marie von Schleinitz and Anna von Helmholtz operated successful and influential scholarly circles predominated by liberal ideas.

Fanny Hensel and Clara Schumann were the two notable female composers of the nineteenth century, although they only began to receive recognition long after their deaths.

Emmy Noether, often considered the greatest female mathematician of all eras, developed new branches of algebra.

Amélie de Dietrich was an important industrialist in the Napoleonic era. Elisabeth Berenberg, the heiress of the Berenberg family, was a prominent banker. Therese Krupp played an important role in the development of the Krupp business dynasty.

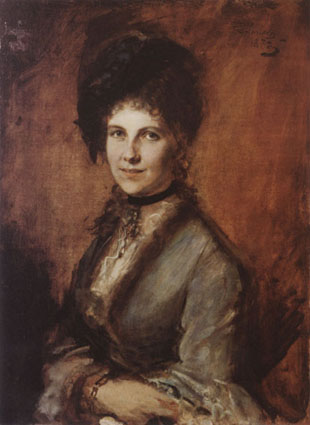
Marie von Schleinitz, the most powerful salonist in Berlin in Bismarck's time. "Anyone who was admitted to Frau von Schleinitz's exclusive salon had passed the admission exam for Prussia's higher society".

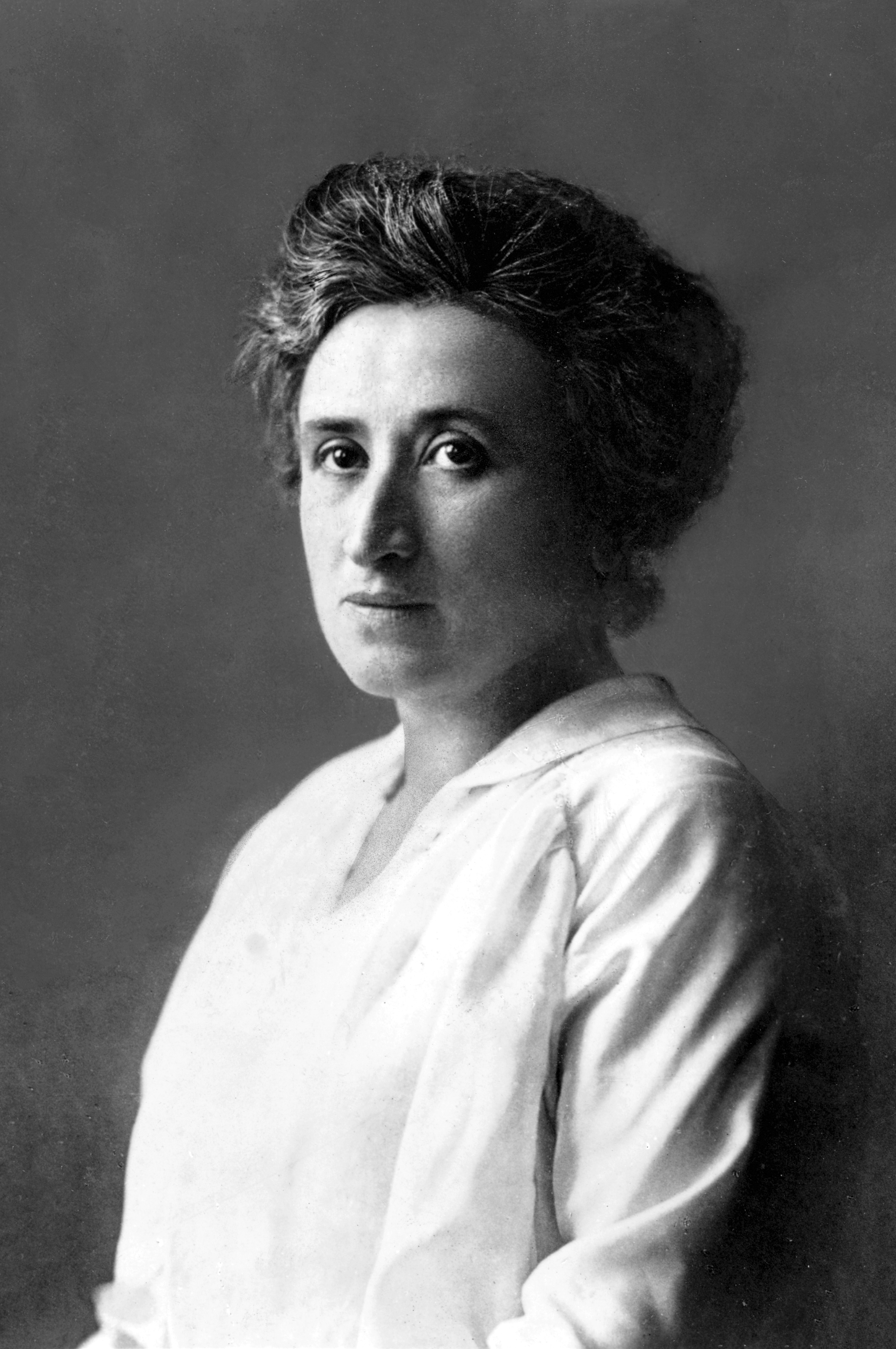
Rosa Luxemburg, Polish-German revolutionary

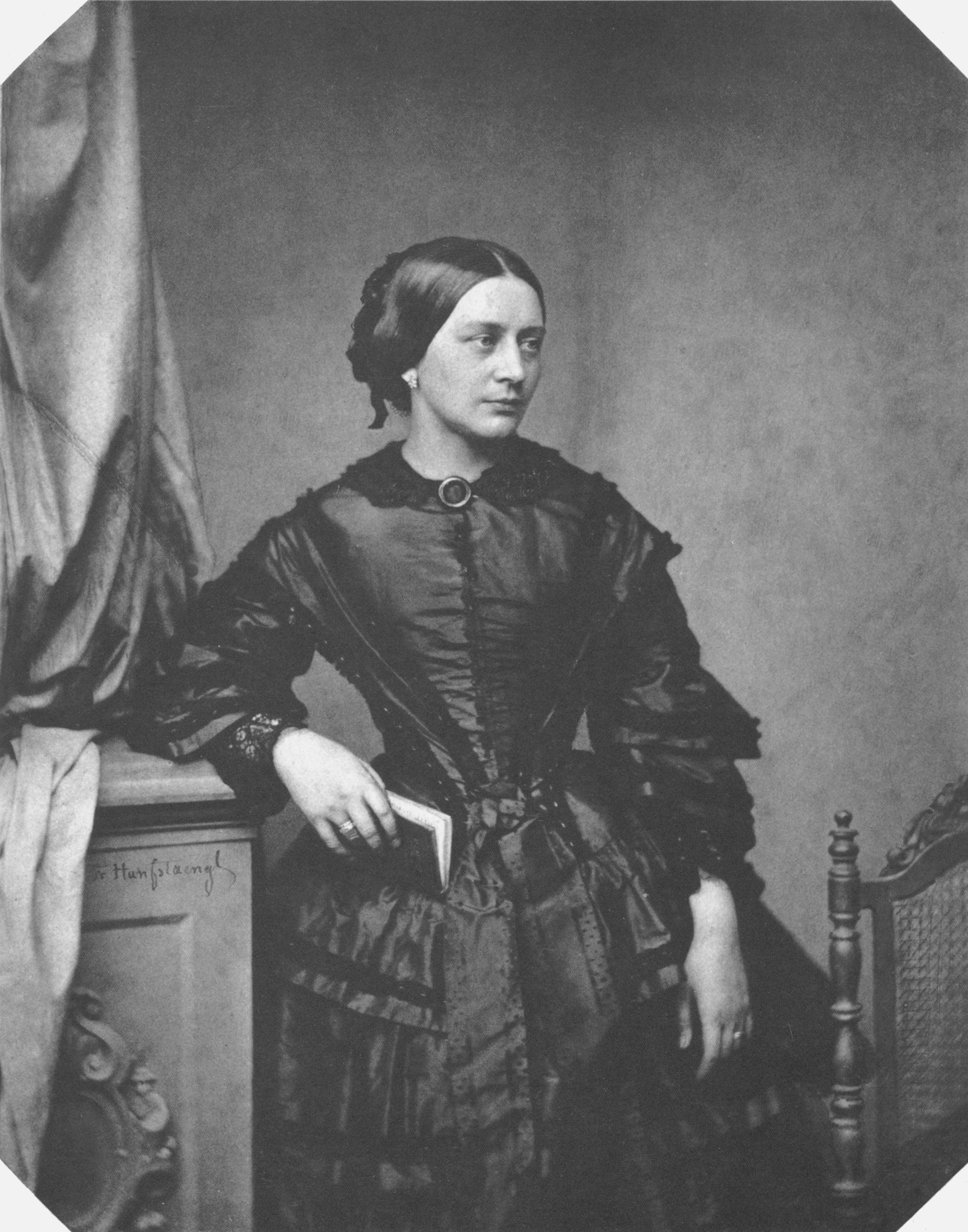
Clara Schumann, composer and pianist

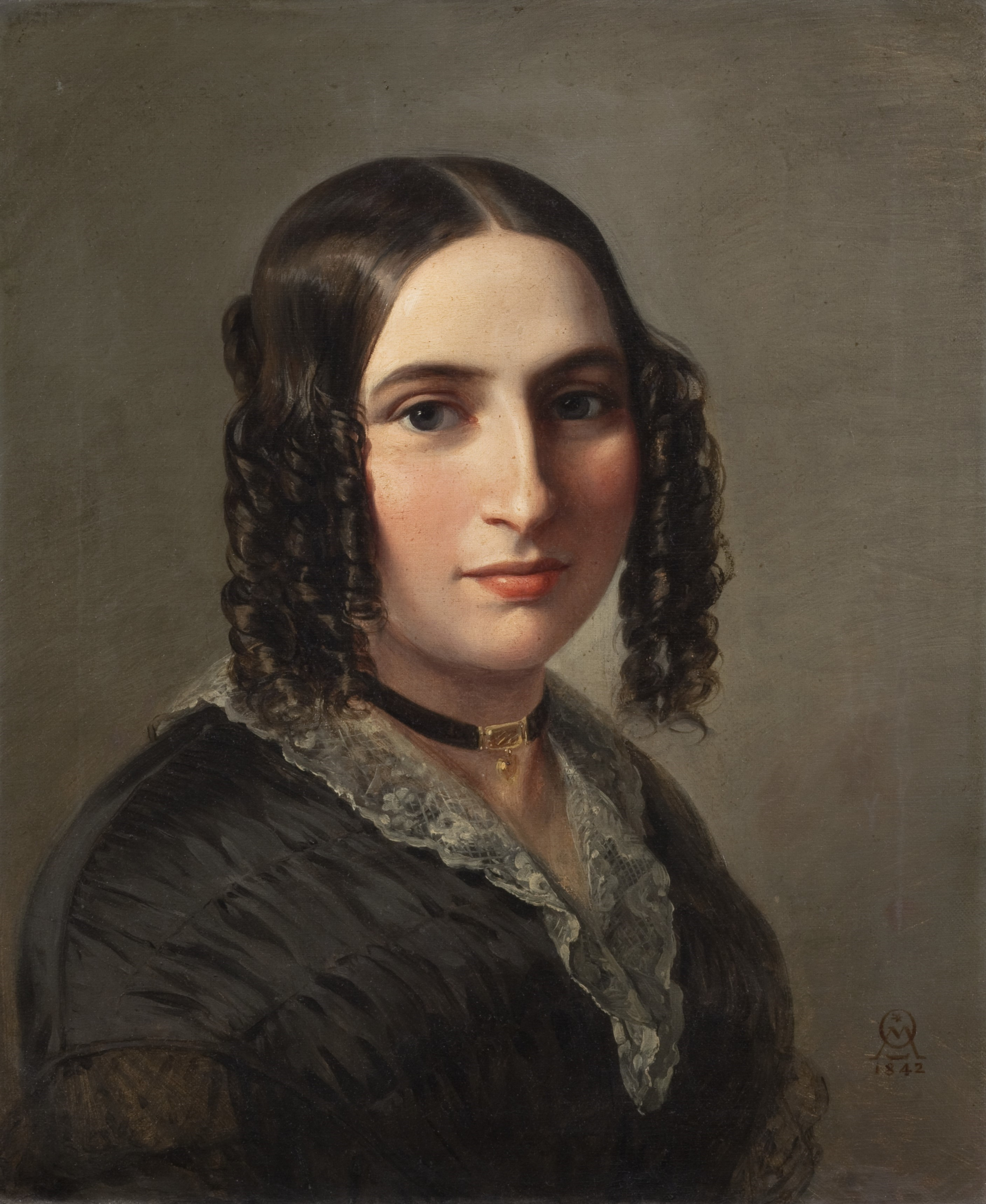
Fanny Mendelssohn

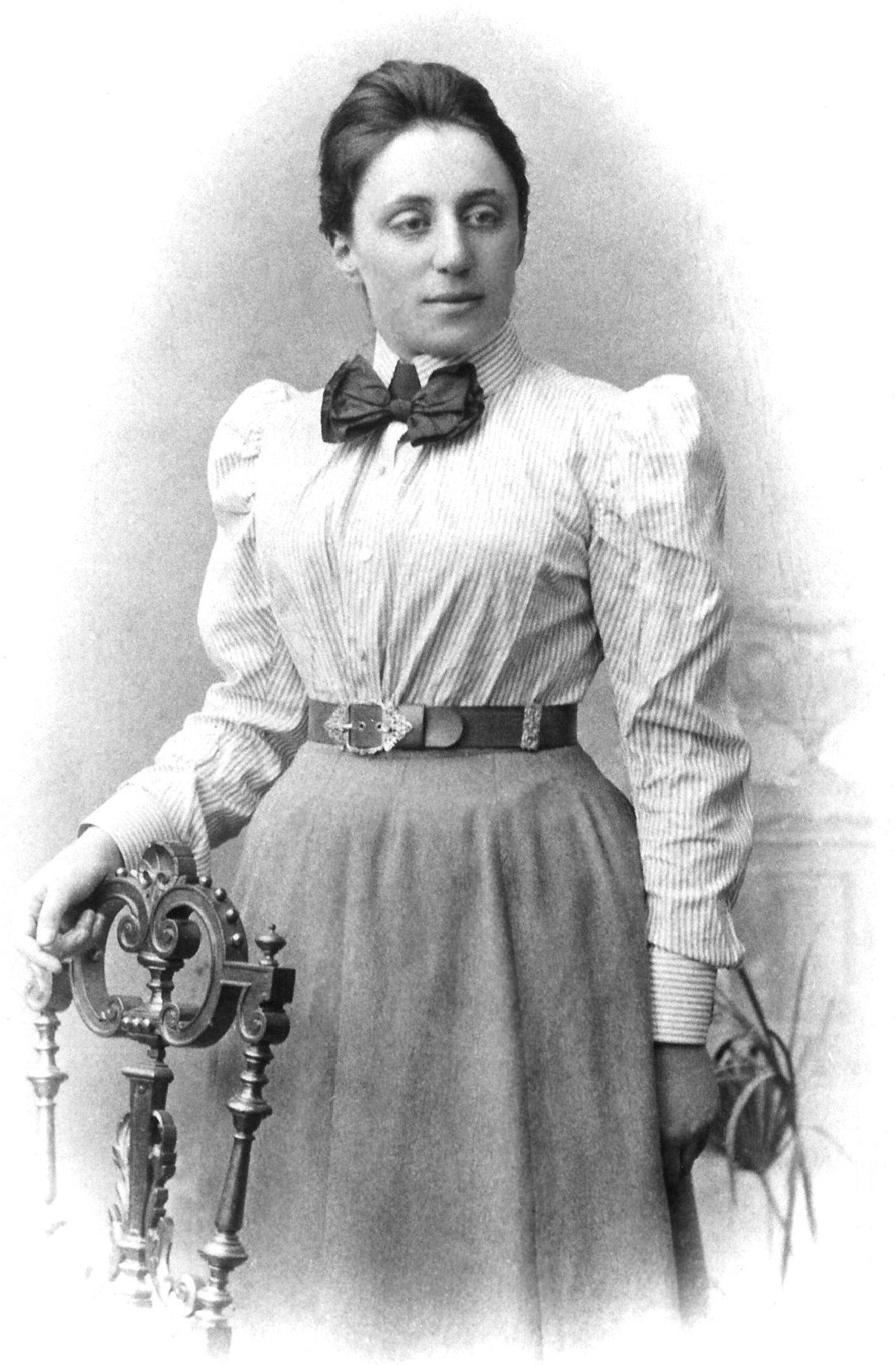
Emmy Noether

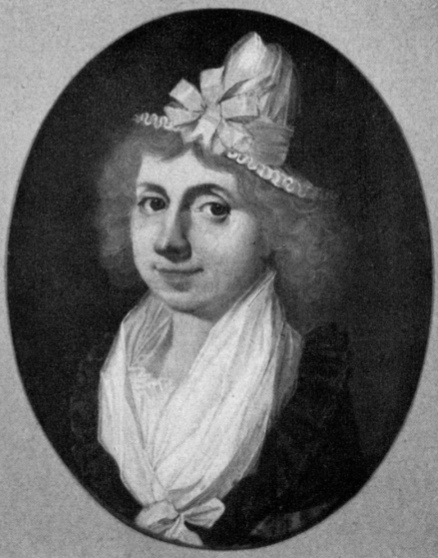
Elisabeth Berenberg

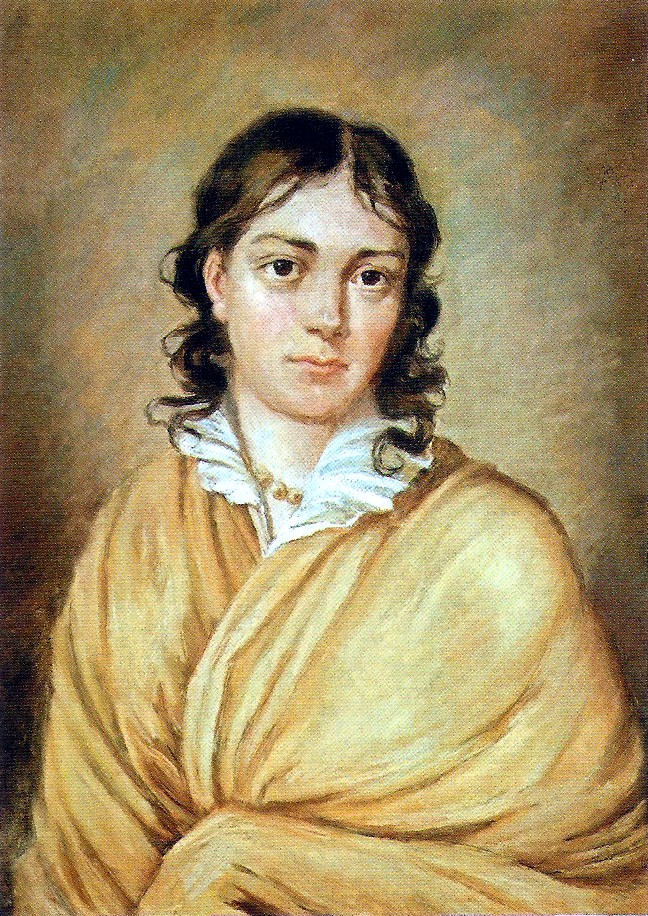
Bettina von Arnim

=== Bourgeois values spread to rural Germany ===
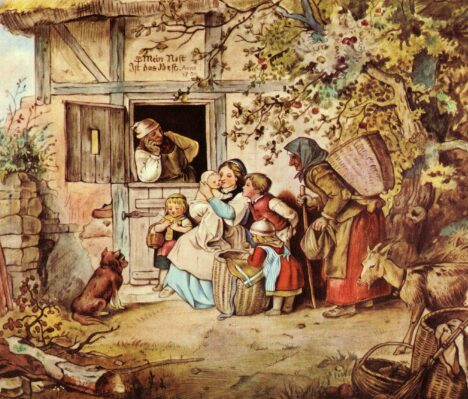
"My nest is the best" by Adrian Ludwig Richter, 1869, a Romantic image of the emerging inner-directed nuclear family

A major social change 1750-1850 Depending on the region, was the end of the traditional whole house" ("ganzes Haus") system, in which the owner's family lived together in one large building with the servants and craftsmen he employed. They reorganized into separate living arrangements. No longer did the owner's wife take charge of all the females in the different families in the whole house. In the new system, farm owners became more professionalized and profit-oriented. They managed the fields and the household exterior according to the dictates of technology, science, and economics. Farm wives supervised family care and the household interior, to which strict standards of cleanliness, order, and thrift were applied. The result was the spread of formerly urban bourgeois values into rural Germany. The lesser families were now living separately on wages. They had to provide for their own supervision, health, schooling, and old age. At the same time, because of the demographic transition, there were far fewer children, allowing for much greater attention to each child. Increasingly the middle-class family valued its privacy and its inward direction, shedding too-close links with the world of work. Furthermore, the working classes, the middle classes, and the upper classes became much more separate physically, psychologically and politically. This allowed for the emergence of working-class organizations. It also allowed for declining religiosity among the working class who were no longer monitored on a daily basis.

=== Demographic transition ===
The era saw the Demographic Transition take place in Germany. It was a transition from high birth rates and high death rates to low birth and death rates as the country developed from a pre-industrial to a modernized agriculture and supported a fast-growing industrialized urban economic system. In previous centuries, the shortage of land meant that not everyone could marry, and marriages took place after age 25. After 1815, increased agricultural productivity meant a larger food supply, and a decline in famines, epidemics, and malnutrition. This allowed couples to marry earlier, and have more children. Arranged marriages became uncommon as young people were now allowed to choose their own marriage partners, subject to a veto by the parents. The high birthrate was offset by a very high rate of infant mortality and emigration, especially after about 1840, mostly to the German settlements in the United States, plus periodic epidemics and harvest failures. The upper and middle classes began to practice birth control, and a little later so too did the peasants.

=== Women's rights movements ===
Germany's unification process after 1871 was heavily dominated by men and gave priority to the "Fatherland" theme and related male issues, such as military prowess. Nevertheless, middle-class women enrolled in the Bund Deutscher Frauenvereine, the Union of German Feminist Organizations (BDF). Founded in 1894, it grew to include 137 separate women's rights groups from 1907 until 1933, when the Nazi regime disbanded the organization. The BDF gave national direction to the proliferating women's organizations that had sprung up since the 1860s. From the beginning the BDF was a bourgeois organization, its members working toward equality with men in such areas as education, financial opportunities, and political life. Working-class women were not welcome; they were organized by the Socialists.

Formal organizations for promoting women's rights grew in numbers during the Wilhelmine period. German feminists began to network with feminists from other countries, and participated in the growth of international organizations.

=== Schooling ===
In Sex in Education, Or, A Fair Chance for Girls (1873), American educator Edward H. Clarke researched educational standards in Germany. He found that by the 1870s, formal education for middle and upper-class girls was the norm in Germany's cities, although it ended at the onset of menarche, which typically happened when a girl was 15 or 16. After this, her education might continue at home with tutors or occasional lectures. Clarke concluded that "Evidently the notion that a boy's education and a girl's education should be the same, and that the same means the boy's, has not yet penetrated the German mind. This has not yet evolved the idea of the identical education of the sexes." Education for peasant girls was not formal, and they learned farming and housekeeping tasks from their parents. This prepared them for a life of harsh labor on the farm. On a visit to Germany, Clarke observed that:

"German peasant girls and women work in the field and shop with and like men. None who have seen their stout and brawny arms can doubt the force with which they wield the hoe and axe. I once saw, in the streets of Coblentz, a woman and a donkey yoked to the same cart, while a man, with a whip in his hand, drove the team. The bystanders did not seem to look upon the moving group as if it were an unusual spectacle.

Young middle-class and upper-class women began to pressure their families and the universities to allow them access to higher education. Anita Augspurg, the first woman university graduate in Germany, graduated with a law degree from the University of Zurich, Switzerland. Several other German women, unable to gain admittance to German universities, also went to the University of Zurich to continue their education. In 1909, German universities finally allowed women to gain admittance—but women graduates were unable to practice their profession, as they were "barred from private practice and public administrative posts for lawyers". The first women's legal aid agency was established by Marie Stritt in 1894; by 1914, there were 97 such legal aid agencies, some employing women law graduates.

Lower-middle-class women often found career roles as dietitians and dietary assistants. The new jobs were enabled by the rapid development of nutritional science and food chemistry. Physicians, furthermore, paid much more attention to diet, emphasizing that the combination of scientific selection of ingredients and high quality preparation was therapeutic for patients with metabolic disturbances. Their social origins in the lower middle class meant dietitians never received professional status.

== Weimar era 1919-1933 ==
The Weimar era (1919-1933) was in general a favorable time for German women, although there were severe economic hardships during the early inflation years, and the depression years at the end. When the Republican governments suddenly and unexpectedly gave all women the right to vote in 1919, conservative women's groups that had opposed suffrage now reversed positions and threw themselves into their new civic duties, with an emphasis on educational programs on how to vote. The largest of all women's groups, the Evangelische Frauenhilfe (Protestant Women's Auxiliary) hurriedly and successfully mobilized its membership. Turnout of women was 82 percent in January 1919.

Educational opportunities that began to open up in the 1880s and 1890s now came to fruition, and women began graduating universities and technical schools in significant numbers. They began professional careers, but typically they were cut short by the reactionary policies of the Nazi regime after 1933.

== Nazi era 1933-45 ==
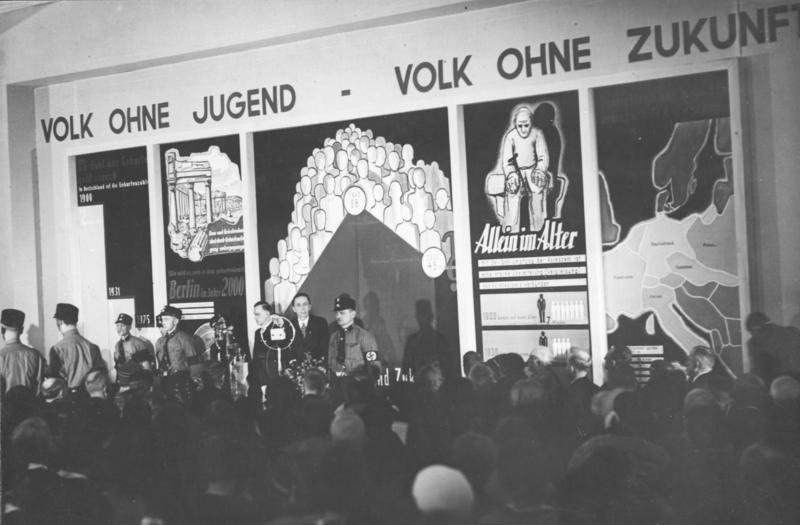
Opening of exposition Die Frau, Frauenleben und -wirken in Familie, Haus und Beruf (Women: the life of women, their role in the family, at home and at work) at the Kaiserdamm, March 18, 1933, with Minister of Propaganda Joseph Goebbels

Historians have begun turning their attention to the role of women in the Nazi years.

Women in Nazi Germany were subject to doctrines of the Nazi Party promoting exclusion of women from the political world. While the Nazi party decreed that "women could be admitted to neither the Party executive nor to the Administrative Committee", this did not prevent numerous women from becoming party members. The Nazi doctrine elevated the role of German men, emphasizing their combat skills and the brotherhood among male compatriots.

Women lived within a regime characterized by a policy of confining them to the roles of mother and spouse and excluding them from all positions of responsibility, notably in the political and academic spheres. The policy of Nazism contrasted starkly with the evolution of emancipation under the Weimar Republic, and is equally distinguishable from the patriarchal and conservative attitude under the German Empire, 1871–1919. The regimentation of women at the heart of satellite organizations of the Nazi Party, as the Bund Deutscher Mädel or the NS-Frauenschaft, had the ultimate goal of encouraging the cohesion of the "people's community" Volksgemeinschaft.

First and foremost in the implied Nazi doctrine concerning women was the notion of motherhood and procreation for those of child-bearing ages. The Nazi model woman did not have a career, but was responsible for the education of her children and for housekeeping. Women only had a limited right to training revolving around domestic tasks, and were, over time, restricted from teaching in universities, from medical professions and from serving in political positions within the NSDAP. Many restrictions were lifted once wartime necessity dictated changes to policy later in the regime's existence.

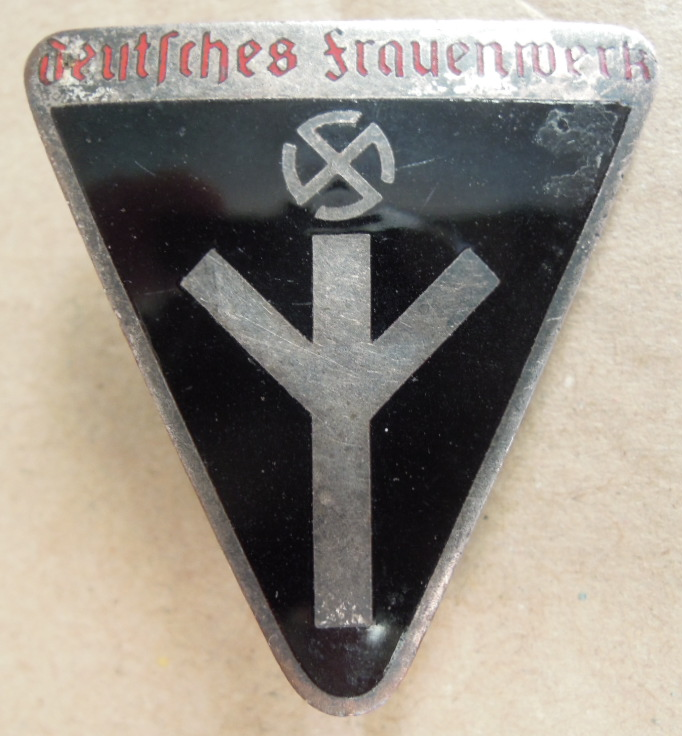
Membership badge of the Deutsches Frauenwerk, a Nazi association for women founded in October 1933

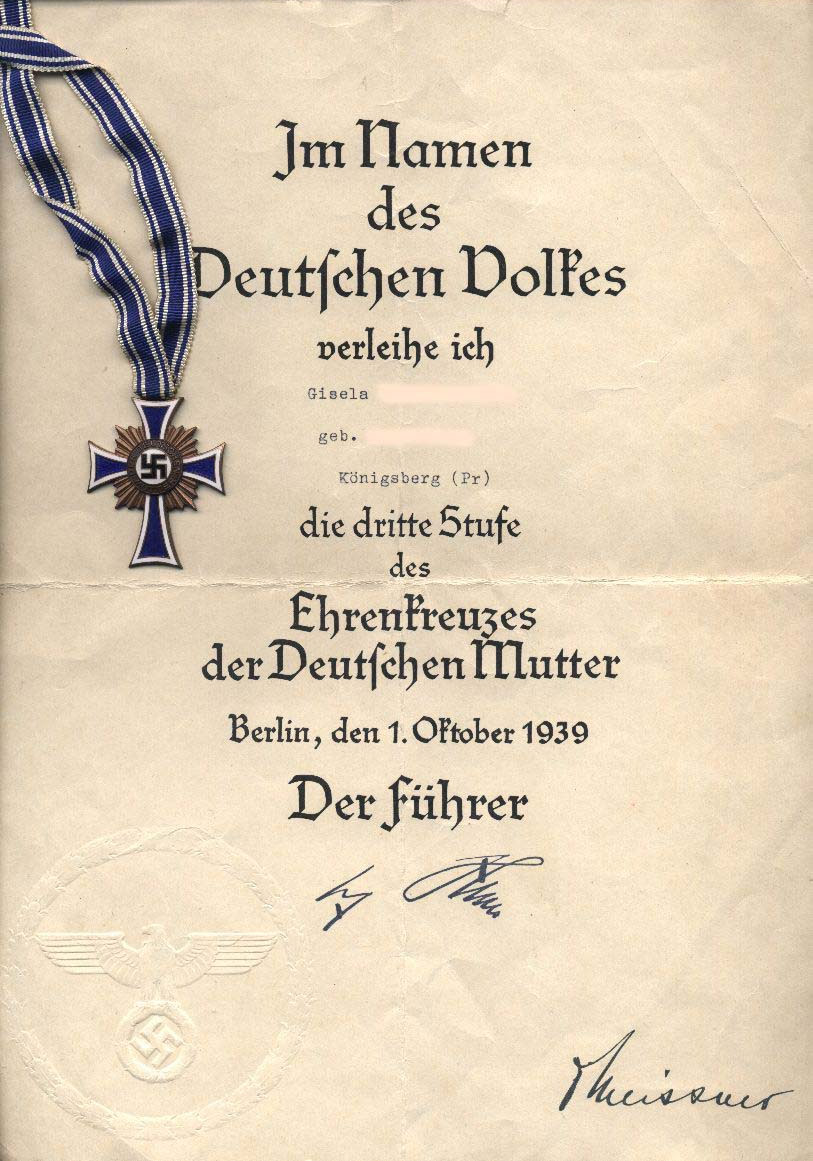
Certificate of the Cross of Honour of the German Mother during World War II

=== Reactionary policies ===
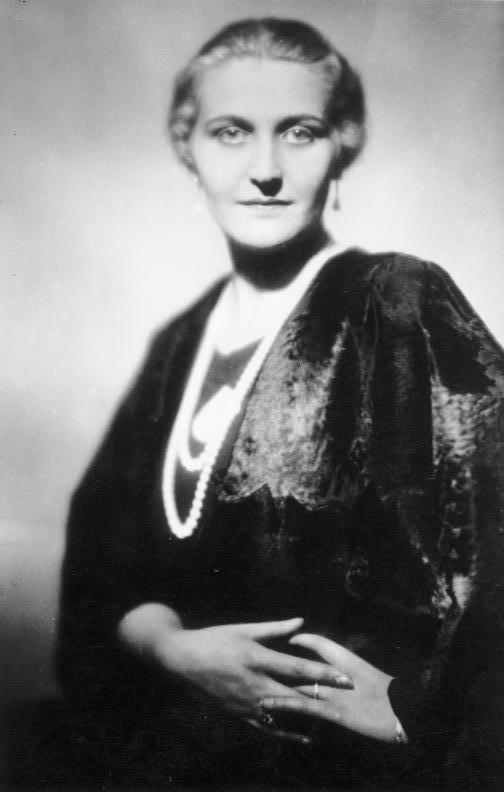
Magda Goebbels (1941)

Historians have paid special attention to the efforts by Nazi Germany to reverse the gains women made before 1933, especially in the relatively liberal Weimar Republic. It appears the role of women in Nazi Germany changed according to circumstances. Theoretically the Nazis believed that women must be subservient to men, avoid careers, devote themselves to childbearing and child-rearing, and be a helpmate of the traditional dominant father in the traditional family.

However, before 1933, women played important roles in the Nazi organization and were allowed some autonomy to mobilize other women. After Hitler came to power in 1933, the activist women were replaced by bureaucratic women who emphasized feminine virtues, marriage, and childbirth. As Germany prepared for war, large numbers were incorporated into the public sector and with the need for full mobilization of factories by 1943, all women were required to register with the employment office. Women's wages remained unequal and women were denied positions of leadership or control. Large numbers of German women played subordinate roles, such as secretaries and file clerks, in wartime agencies, including guards in the system of concentration camps, extermination camps, and the Holocaust.

=== Glamour pilots ===
With the exception of Reichsführerin Gertrud Scholtz-Klink, no women were allowed to carry out official functions; however, some exceptions stood out in the regime, either through their proximity to Adolf Hitler, such as Magda Goebbels, or by excelling in particular fields, such as filmmaker Leni Riefenstahl or aviator Hanna Reitsch.

A few women were exempt from the constraints for propaganda purposes. The Nazi regime emphasized technological advances, especially in aviation, and made female aviators the centerpiece of their publicity. These "flying ambassadors" were sent abroad as citizen pilots promoting Berlin's economic and political agenda. The proliferation of German women sports pilots in the 1920s and early 1930s camouflaged the much larger scale quiet training of male sports pilots as future Luftwaffe officers. The overwhelmingly male aviation environment was hostile to the presence of women but reluctantly went along with the propaganda efforts. Berlin capitalized on the enormous attention these women received, citing them as evidence of the greatness of German aviation. But by 1935 Germany had built up its Luftwaffe and was interested only in displaying power through its aviation and had less use for the women. However, in 1944, with the declaration of "total war," women were recruited to fly for the Luftwaffe's ferrying unit and to work as gliding instructors. Hanna Reitsch (1912–79) was Germany's famous female aviator. During the Nazi era, she served as a loyal representative internationally. She was not especially political. After the war, she was sponsored by the West German foreign office as a technical adviser in Ghana and elsewhere in the 1960s.

Many women filled staff roles at the heart of the Nazi system, including minor posts in the Nazi concentration camps. A few were secretly engaged in the German resistance and paid with their lives, such as Libertas Schulze-Boysen and Sophie Scholl.

=== Military service in WW2 ===
In 1944-45 more than 500,000 women were volunteer uniformed auxiliaries in the German armed forces (Wehrmacht). About the same number served in civil aerial defense, 400,000 volunteered as nurses, and many more replaced drafted men in the wartime economy. In the Luftwaffe they served in combat roles helping to operate the anti—aircraft systems that shot down Allied bombers.

== 1970s-present ==
Until 1977, married women in West Germany could not work without permission from their husbands.

From 1919 through the 1980s, women comprised about 10 percent of the Bundestag. The Green Party had a 50 percent quota, so that increased the numbers. Since the late 1990s, women have reached a critical mass in German politics.

Women's increased presence in government since 2000 is due to generational change. They have completed a long march from the basic to more advanced institutions. While the left took the lead, the conservative CDU/CSU worked hard to catch up in the representation of women. By winning more than 30% of the Bundestag seats in 1998, women reached a critical mass in leadership roles in the coalition of the Social Democratic and Green parties. At the state level, the proportion of women ranged from 20 to 40 percent. Women in high office have pushed through important reforms in areas of gender and justice; research and technology; family and career; health, welfare, and consumer protection; sustainable development; foreign aid; migration; and human rights.

Angela Merkel, Germany's chancellor from 2005 to 2021, is a notable example of this. She has been praised by commentators for her success in building coalitions and focusing on relevant issues.

== See also ==
- Bonn Women's Museum
- Economic history of Germany
- EMMA (magazine)
- Feminale
- Feminism in Germany
- Women in Germany
- Women in Nazi Germany
- Women's history
