= Verhoek =

Verhoek is a Dutch toponymic surname. It is a contraction of van der Hoek, meaning "from the corner". Notable people with the surname include:

- Gijsbert Verhoek (1644–1690), Dutch Golden Age painter, brother of Pieter
- Iris Verhoek (born 2001), Dutch singer
- John Verhoek (born 1989), Dutch footballer, brother of Wesley
- Peter Verhoek (born 1955), New Zealand cricketer
- Pieter Verhoek (1633–1702), Dutch Golden Age painter, brother of Gijsbert
- Wesley Verhoek (born 1986), Dutch footballer, brother of John
