= Van den Hoek =

Van den Hoek is a Dutch toponymic surname meaning "from the corner". Variations on the name include Van Hoek, Van der Hoek, Van den Hoeck, Van den Hoecke, and concatenated forms of these. The surname Verhoek is a contraction of "Van der Hoek". People with these surnames include:

Van den Hoek

- Aad van den Hoek (born 1951), Dutch racing cyclist
- Arnold van den Hoek (1921–1945), Dutch chess player
- Bianca van den Hoek (born 1976), Dutch racing cyclist
- Cornelis Pieter van den Hoek (1921–2015), Dutch World War II resistance fighter
- Leanne van den Hoek (born 1958), Dutch army officer
- Martyn van den Hoek (1957–2022), Dutch classical pianist

Van der Hoek

See Van der Hoek.

Van den Hoeck

- Abraham Vandenhoeck (1700–1750), Dutch founder of the German scholarly publishing house Vandenhoeck & Ruprecht
- Anna Vandenhoeck (1709–1787), German printer

Van den Hoecke

- Gaspar van den Hoecke (c. 1585–after 1648), Flemish still life painter
- Jan van den Hoecke (1611–1651), Flemish painter and draughtsman, son of Gaspar
- Robert van den Hoecke (1622–1668), Flemish battle scenes painter, son of Gaspar

Van Hoek

- Hans van Hoek (born 1947), Dutch painter and woodcarver
- John Van Hoek (born 1952), Australian judoka
- Lotte van Hoek (born 1991), Dutch racing cyclist

== See also ==
- Hoek (surname), Dutch surname of the same origin
- Hoek (disambiguation)
