= Hoek =

Hoek, corner in Dutch and Afrikaans, may refer to:

the name of several villages in the Netherlands

- Hook of Holland (Hoek van Holland), near Rotterdam
- Hoek, Zeeland, near Terneuzen
- Hoek, Gelderland

People

- Hoek (surname), Dutch surname
- Van den Hoek (disambiguation), Dutch surname

Other

- Hoek Glacier, Antarctic glacier
