= Van der Hoek =

Van der Hoek is a surname, and may refer to:

- André van der Hoek, Dutch-American computer scientist
- Frans Robert Jan van der Hoek known as Roberto Vander (born 1950) Dutch-born Chilean actor and singer
- Hans van der Hoek (1933–2017), Dutch footballer
- Jan van der Hoek (born 1940), Dutch volleyball player
- Rosalie van der Hoek (born 1994), Dutch tennis player
- Zeke Vanderhoek, American teacher and entrepreneur

== See also ==
- Van den Hoek
