= Hoek (surname) =

Hoek is a Dutch surname. It may have a patronymic origin, as Hoek was a West Frisian form of the name Hugo. It can also be a shortened form of names like Van den Hoek ("from the corner"). People with the surname include:

== Hoek ==
- Evert Hoek (1933–2024), South African-Canadian geotechnical engineer
- Frans Hoek (born 1956), Dutch football goalkeeper and coach
- Henry Hoek (1878–1951), German pioneering ski mountaineer, namesake of the Hoek Glacier
- Martin Hoek (1834–1873), Dutch astronomer and experimental physicist
- Milan Hoek (born 1991), Dutch football defender
- Paulus Peronius Cato Hoek (1851–1914), Dutch ichthyologist
- Sylvia Hoeks (born 1983), Dutch film and television actress

== Hoeck ==
- Horst Hoeck (1904–1969), German Olympic rower
- Johann Hoeck (1499–1553), German Lutheran theologian known as "Johannes Aepinus"
- Karl Hoeck (1794–1877), German classical historian and philologist

== Fictional characters ==
- Ren Höek, chihuahua from The Ren & Stimpy Show

== See also ==
- Van den Hoek, incl. "Van Hoek" and "Van der Hoek"
