= Günther Ruprecht =

German publisher

Günther Ruprecht (17 February 1898, in Göttingen – 17 March 2001, in Göttingen) was a German publisher. He was a leader of the German publishing company Vandenhoeck & Ruprecht in Göttingen since 1929. He was a leader in the anti-Nazi movement, the so-called Jungreformatorischen Bewegung, in the Kirchenkampf as a part of the Deutschen Evangelischen Kirche (DEK) in Nazi Germany. He published their magazine "Junge Kirche" (young church) and in order to do that founded another publishing company in Switzerland in his name ("Verlag Junge Kirche, Günther Ruprecht") since it was too dangerous to do it in Germany. In 1946 Ruprecht published the famous speech by Martin Niemöller about the war guilt of the Germans. In his other publishing work he focused on theology and the Protestant church. He published renowned theological encyclopedia, teaching material and published the first complete commentary series of the old testament in German (das Alte Testament Deutsch ATD) and the additional series ATD-Apokryphen. Ruprecht received multiple honors for his life's work. He received the Bundesverdienstkreuz, a high honor by the German government and was the first honorary citizen of the Georg-August-Universität Göttingen. For his 100th birthday he received an honorary doctorate by the theological faculty of this University on February 15, 1998.
