= Pieter Verhoek =

Dutch Golden Age poet and painter (1633–1702)

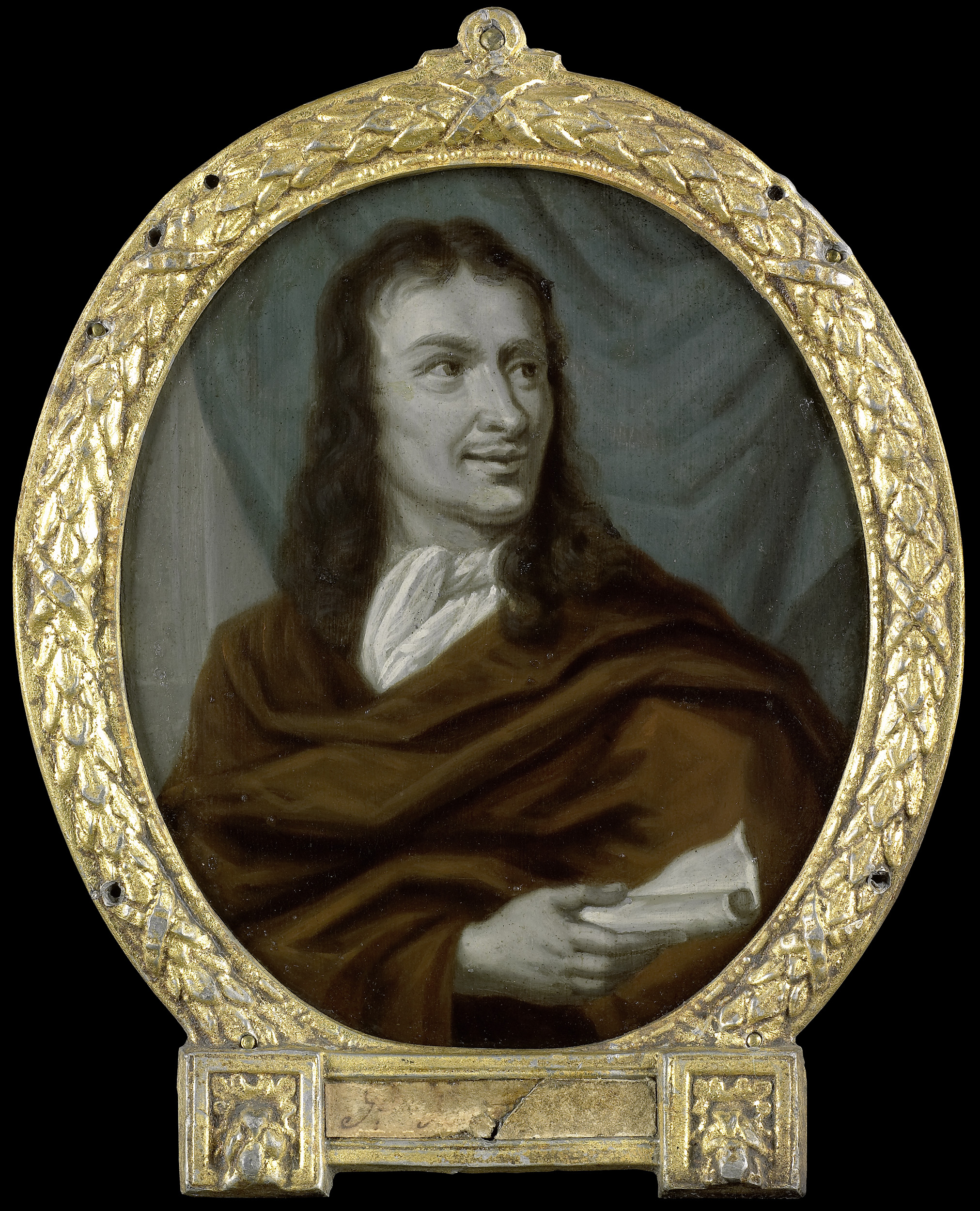
Pieter Verhoek's Portrait (1633–1702)

Pieter Verhoek (1633 in Bodegraven – 1702 in Amsterdam), was a Dutch Golden Age poet and marble painter.

According to Houbraken he was the brother of Gysbert Verhoek. He was the pupil of Jacob van der Ulft of Gorinchem who taught him to be a glass painter, and then he moved to Amsterdam and became a pupil of Abraham Hondius. He travelled to Italy and learned to make battle scenes in the manner of Jacques Courtois. Back in Amsterdam he became a member of the poet's society (Dutch: Dight-Schoole) of Jan Zoet, Nil volentibus arduum, and wrote a play Karel de Stoute that was first performed in the Amsterdam theatre in 1689. He wrote a poem in honor of Gerard de Lairesse and according to J.C. Weyerman he was good friends with the landscape painters Job and Gerrit Berckheyde.

According to the RKD he was the brother of Gysbert and the nephew of Johannes Verhoek (who translated R de Piles from French in Dutch).
