= Amélie de Dietrich =

German businessperson

- Born: Amélie de Berckheim; 1776
- Died: 1855 (aged 78–79)
- Occupation: Industrialist
- Spouse: Jean-Albert de Dietrich
- Family: De Dietrich

Amélie de Dietrich, née de Berckheim (1776–1855) was a French industrialist. She managed the ironworks in Jaegerthal from 1806 after the death of her husband to her own death. She has been referred to as the first female industrialist in Alsace.

De Dietrich was married to Jean-Albert de Dietrich (1773–1806). After his death, she inherited the major De Dietrich Company, then one of the largest companies in Europe. De Dietrich was considered a major industrial magnate during the reign of Napoleon I.

De Dietrich is described as a successful innovator who was the first to introduce decorative designs into industrial products from cast iron.
