= Gisela of Kerzenbroeck =

German artist (died 1300)

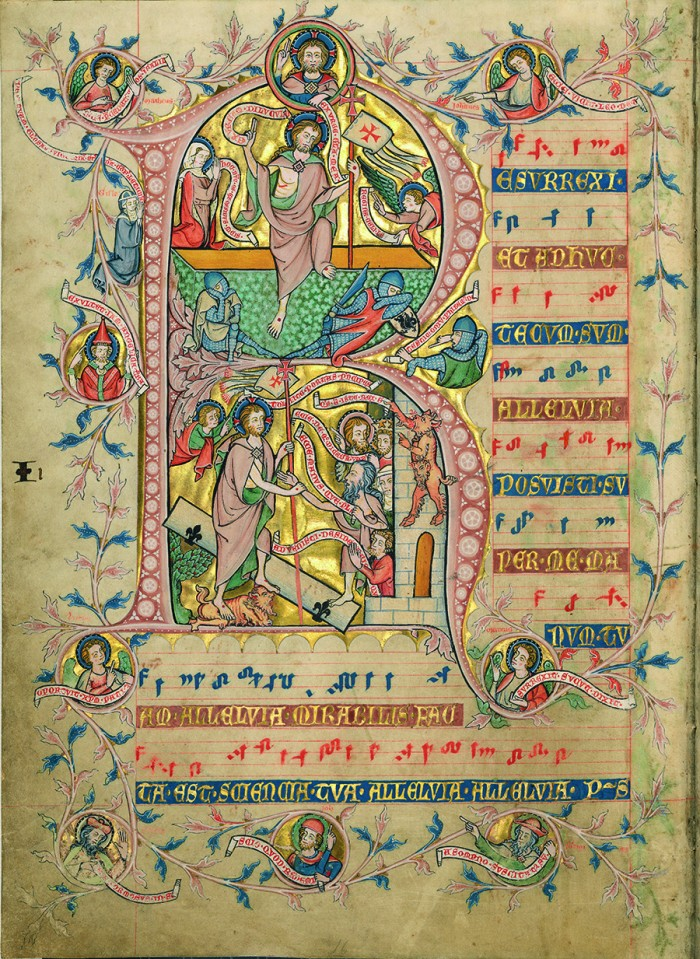
Codes Gisle, Easter page

Gisela of Kerzenbroeck or Gisela von Kerssenbrock (died by 1300) was a nun in the northern German city of Rulle who probably worked most of her life writing and illustrating manuscripts, as well as being choirmistress.

== Codex Gisle ==
Gisela de Kerzenbroeck is documented only as the creator of what is now known as Codex Gisle or "Gradual of Gisela von Kerssenbrock", a gradual made for the Cistercian convent of Rulle near Osnabrück in Westphalia, and now in Osnabrück. The following words are inscribed in a fourteenth-century charterhand on the first folio:

The venerable and devout virgin Gisela de Kerzenbroeck wrote, illuminated, notated, paginated, and decorated in gold letters and beautiful images this extraordinary book in her own memory, in the year of the Lord 1300. May her soul rest in peace. Amen.

This inscription was added after Gisela’s death, although possibly some considerable time after, judging from the style of the manuscript .

The manuscript contains 52 historiated initials, two of which include portraits of Gisela, marked with tituli.
