= Karl Hoeck =

German classical historian, philologist and librarian

Karl Friedrich Christian Hoeck (May 13, 1794, at Oelber am weißen Wege – January 13, 1877, in Göttingen) was a German classical historian and philologist as well as a librarian.

== Life ==
After attending the gymnasium (high school) at Wolfenbüttel, Hoeck studied classical studies in Göttingen from 1812 until 1816. During his period as a student he was already connecting to the university library; in 1814 he became accessist, and in 1815 secretary. Towards the end of his studies he was a member, together with Christian Karl Josias von Bunsen, Karl Lachmann and Ernst Schulze, of the Philological Seminary and specialized in ancient history under the direction of Arnold Hermann Ludwig Heeren. With a prize essay from the year 1816 he achieved his doctorate on 3 March 1818 and worked from Easter of the same year as a private lecturer for classical philology and ancient history at the University of Göttingen. As a philologist he delivered exegetical meetings on the historians Herodotus and Livy and on the orator Demosthenes, as an historian on the world of ancient history and antiquities.

In the year of his appointment to extraordinary professor, 1823, Hoeck published the first volume of his magnum opus on mythology, history, religion, and state of the island of Crete in the prehistorical to the Roman period. In the first volume he dealt with the topography and prehistory of the island; in the second volume (1828), that of Minoan Crete; in the third (1829), the Doric. Although this work was highly appreciated by experts in the field, his success was restricted by the Geschichten Hellenischer Stämme und Städte (History of Hellenic Tribes and Cities) (Breslau, 1820-1824) by Karl Otfried Müller which appeared shortly before his.

In the 1840s, Hoeck's second great work, which dealt with the history of the decline of the Republic to the Emperor Constantine, appeared. Hoeck devoted particular attention to the constitution and administration of the Roman Empire. Due to the constantly increasing material, the work remained unfinished: only the first volume, which dealt with the time from Augustus to Nero, appeared in three books (1841, 1843, and 1850).

Hoeck witnessed the pinnacle of his career in 1845 when he was named successor of the late Georg Friedrich Benecke as leader of the university library. Here he remained another thirty years in the office and dignity thereof; in 1858 he was promoted to upper librarian, and in 1862 he was appointed councilor. During his period in office, he managed the library on the old principles and forms of organization going back to Christian Gottlob Heyne. Due to the stagnation of the collections since the 1830s, there was no present need for reforms. In 1865 he was awarded an honorary citizenship of the city of Göttingen. In 1875, after sixty years in the service of the library, Hoeck applied for retirement and retired as leader of the library. He died two years later in his 83rd year.
