= Aletta Haniel =

German businessperson

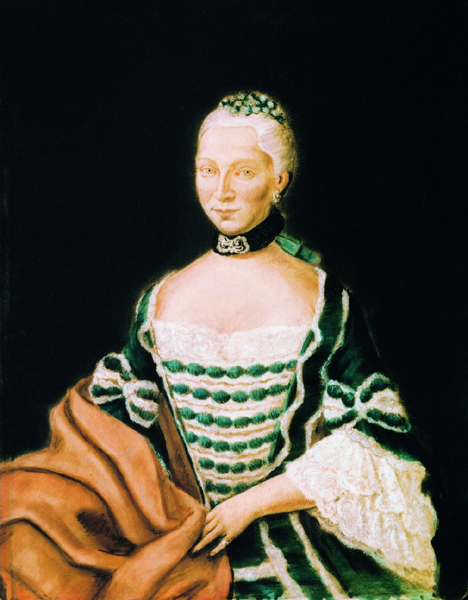
Aletta Haniel

Aletta Haniel née Noot (1742–1815), was a German business person. She managed a substantial transport and trade firm in Duisburg in 1782-1809.

She was the daughter of Jan Willem Noot, married Jacob Wilhelm Haniel in 1761 and became the mother of Franz Haniel.

In 1772, she and her spouse took over the company of her father Franz Haniel & Cie., and in 1782, she took over the wine merchant and transport firm as a widow. She also, from 1792, managed a coal trading company and shipped iron along the rivers Ruhr and Rhine.

She retired in 1809 and divided the firm among her sons.

== Sources ==
- Béatrice Craig: Women and Business Since 1500: Invisible Presences in Europe and North America?
