= Vandenhoeck & Ruprecht =

German scholarly publishing house

- Founded: 1735
- Founder: Abraham Vandenhoeck
- Country of origin: Germany
- Headquarters location: Göttingen
- Publication types: Scholarly books and journals
- Nonfiction topics: Theology and Religion, History, Ancient History, Philosophy and Philology
- Imprints: V&R unipress
- Official website: www.vandenhoeck-ruprecht-verlage.com

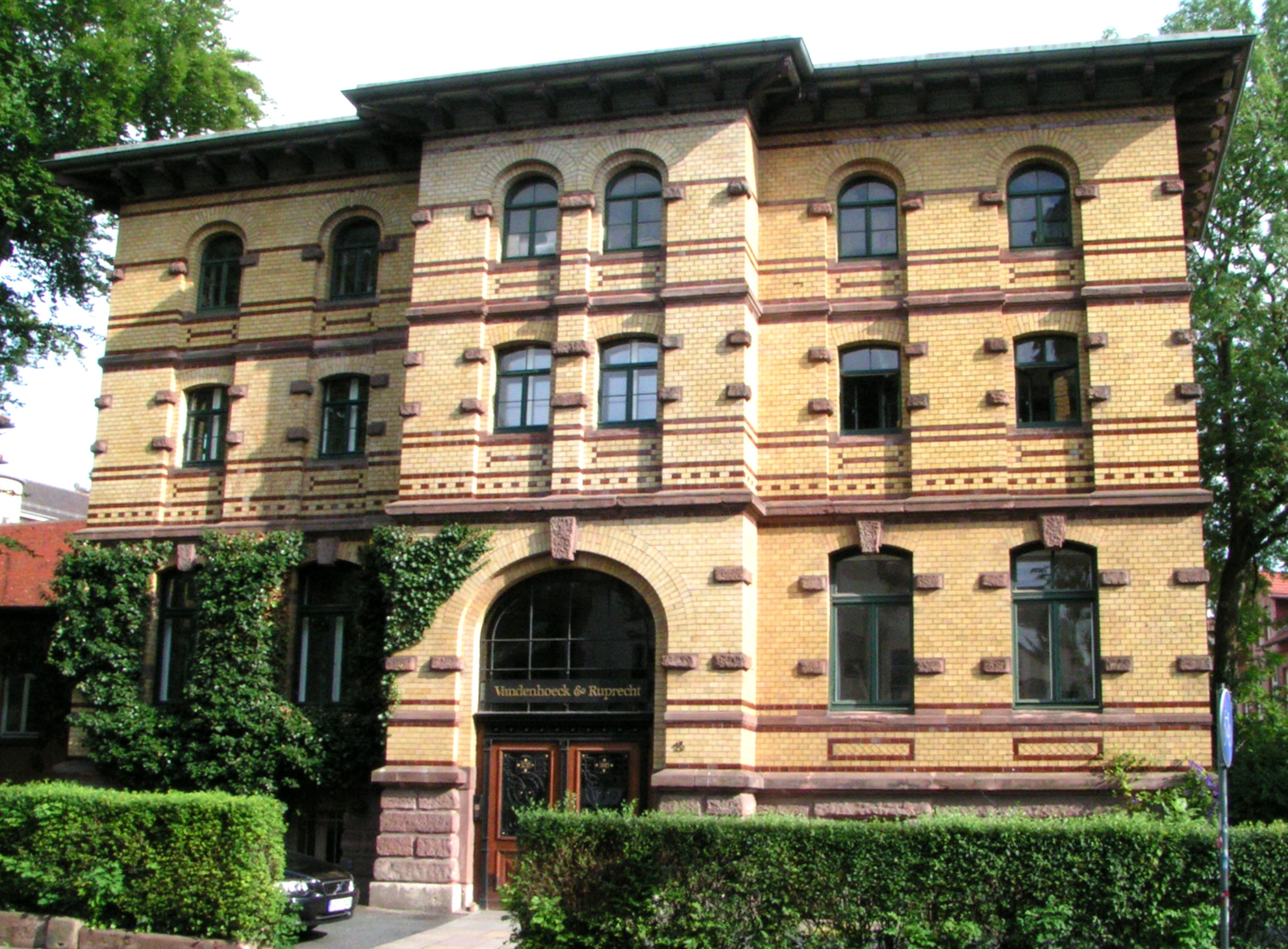
The publisher's building in Göttingen

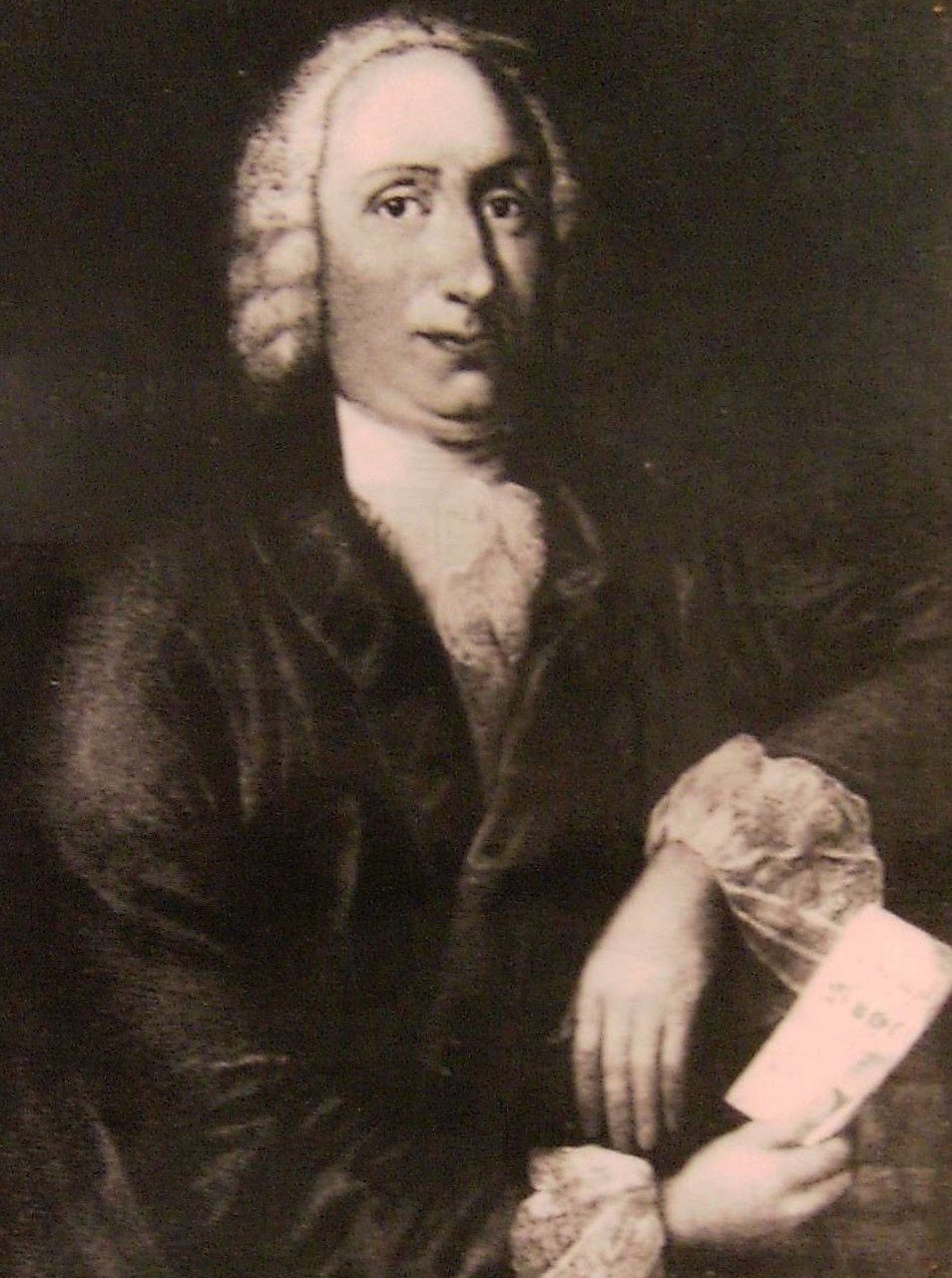
Abraham Vandenhoeck

Vandenhoeck & Ruprecht (V&R) is a scholarly publishing house based in Göttingen, Germany. It was founded in 1735 by Abraham Vandenhoeck (1700–1750) in connection with the establishment of the Georg-August-Universität in the same city.

After Abraham Vandenhoeck's death in 1750, his English-born widow, Anna Vandenhoeck, née Parry (d. 1787) successfully continued the business together with Carl Friedrich Günther Ruprecht (born 1730), who had entered the business as an eighteen-year-old apprentice in 1748. At the death of Anna Vandenhoeck in 1787, Ruprecht took over the business which he led until his death in 1816, when he was succeeded by his 25-year-old son Carl August Adolf Ruprecht (1791-1861). The management of the company remained in the hands of the Ruprecht family for seven generations.

The traditional core areas of the publications of V&R are Theology and Religion, History, Ancient History, Philosophy and Philology. Current production also includes schoolbooks and non-academic publications. Günther Ruprecht was the leader of the publishing house from 1929.

In 1935, the Göttingen Academy of Sciences gave Vandenhoeck & Ruprecht responsibility for its publications. These include the Abhandlungen der Akademie der Wissenschaften zu Göttingen, the Nachrichten der Akademie der Wissenschaften zu Göttingen, and the Göttingische Gelehrte Anzeigen, the last of which is the oldest academic journal in the German-language area.

During the Nazi era, V&R published the journal Junge Kirche ("Young Church"), the mouthpiece of the anti-Nazi Protestant movement Confessing Church. The periodical was shut down by the authorities in 1941; for the rest of World War II, the company was forced to limit its publishing to philology, natural sciences and text books for school teaching. After the war, it returned to its earlier ambitions to be a comprehensive academic press.
