= Gijsbert Verhoek =

Dutch Golden Age painter

Gysbert, or Gijsbert Verhoek (1644 in Bodegraven – 1690 in Amsterdam), was a Dutch Golden Age painter.

== Biography ==
According to Houbraken he was the younger brother (by 11 years) of the glass painter Pieter Verhoek, who learned to paint from Jacob van der Ulft in Gorinchem. He learned to paint from his brother Pieter, who had moved to Amsterdam to take up marble-painting, an interior decoration form that had become more fashionable than glass painting. Gijsbert became the pupil of Adam Pijnacker, who knew his brother very well. He also became friends with the brothers Job and Gerrit Adriaenszoon Berckheyde. He made drawings in the style of "Ludovicus Rouhier" or "den Bourgonjon". He died of gout and left a son who had been trained by his brother in marble-painting and who still conducted that business when Houbraken was writing (1704–1710).

According to the RKD he was a pupil of Pijnacker who was known for his scenes with soldiers and cavalry, both in paintings and drawings. He became a follower of Jacques Courtois and painted horsemen and cavalry scenes. He was buried in the Nieuwezijds Kapel.
