= Anna Vandenhoeck =

German printer (1709–1787)

Anna Vandenhoeck (1709–1787) was a German printer. She managed the printing shop Vandenhoeck & Ruprecht in Göttingen after the death of her spouse Abraham Vandenhoeck in 1751 to 1787, the printing shop was famous for publishing a great number of the well known literature from the Age of Enlightenment.

Anna Perry was born in 1709 in England. She married Abraham Vandenhoeck, a fellow Reformed Protestant, and ran a printing business with him in Hamburg, Germany. After moving to Göttingen, they established a printing shop in 1735. Following the death of her husband in the summer of 1750, she took over the publishing house. In the early 1780s she established a reading circle that had access to international publications.

Vandenhoeck died on 5 March 1787. The Anna Vandenhoeck Guest Lectureship for Literary Criticism is named for her.
