= Themes in Nazi propaganda =

Topics in propaganda in Nazi Germany

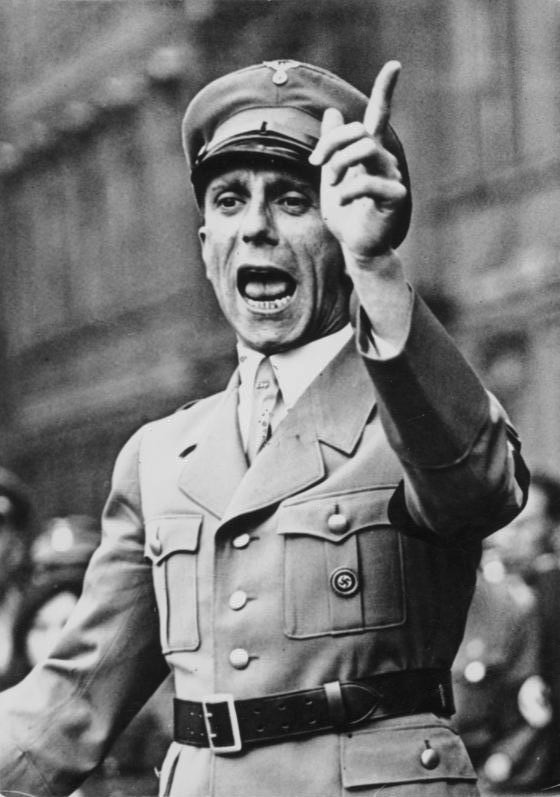
Joseph Goebbels, the head of Nazi Germany's Ministry of Public Enlightenment and Propaganda

The propaganda of the Nazi regime that governed Germany from 1933 to 1945 promoted Nazi ideology by demonizing the enemies of the Nazi Party, notably Jews and communists, but also capitalists and intellectuals. It promoted the values asserted by the Nazis, including Heldentod (heroic death), Führerprinzip (leader principle), Volksgemeinschaft (people's community), Blut und Boden (blood and soil) and pride in the Germanic Herrenvolk (master race). Propaganda was also used to maintain the cult of personality around Nazi leader Adolf Hitler, and to promote campaigns for eugenics and the annexation of German-speaking areas. After the outbreak of World War II, Nazi propaganda vilified Germany's enemies, notably the United Kingdom, the Soviet Union and the United States, and in 1943 exhorted the population to total war.

== Enemies ==
=== Jews ===
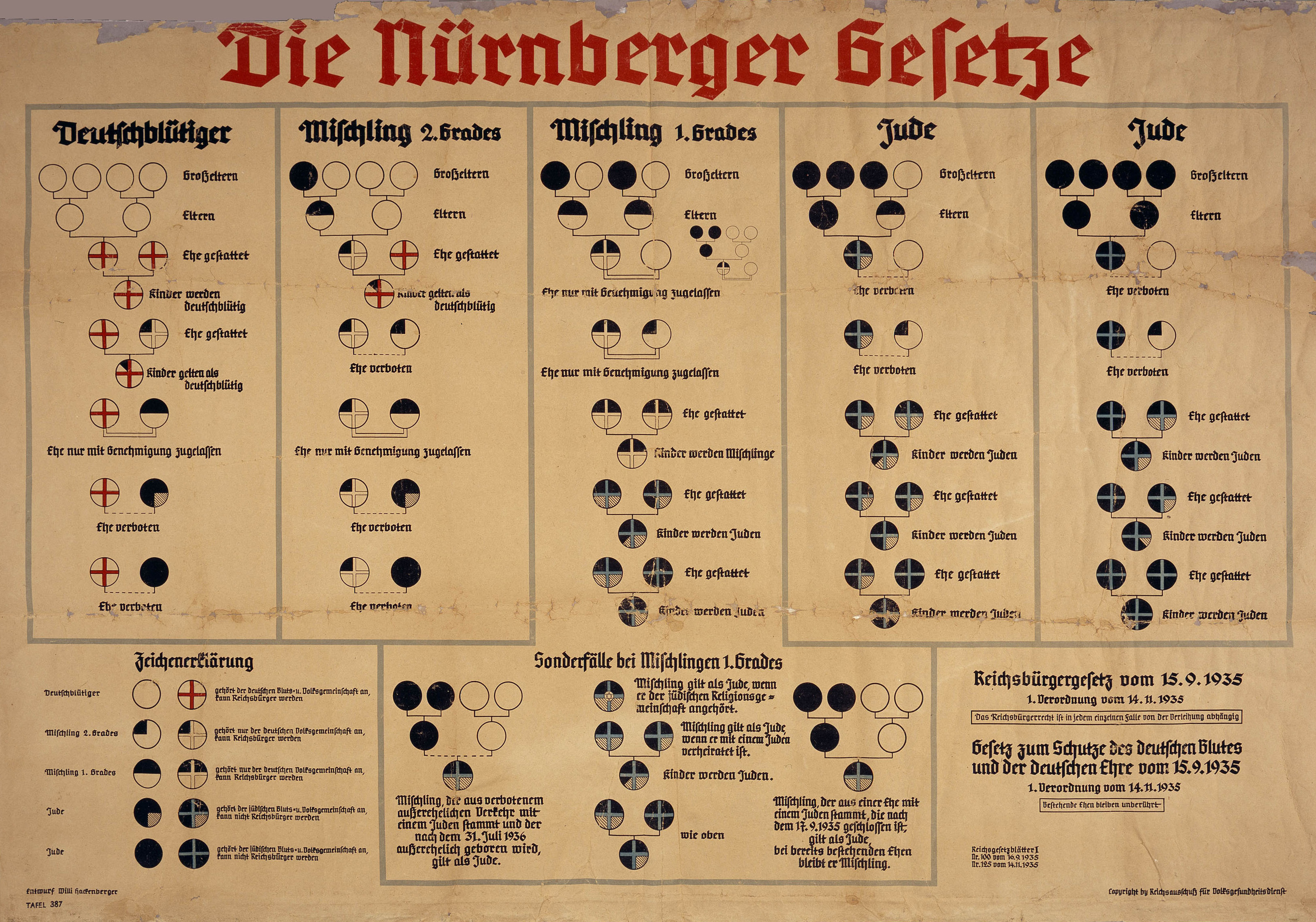
A diagram of the Nuremberg Laws that shows the pseudo-scientific racial division, which is the basis of racial policies of Nazi Germany. Only people with four German grandparents (four white circles – the first table on the left) were considered to be "full-blooded" Germans. German nationals with three or four Jewish ancestors in their family tree (fourth and fifth column from the left) were designated by as Jews. The center column shows the people of "mixed blood" (Mischlinge), depending on the amount of Jewish ancestry. All Jewish grandparents were automatically defined as members of the Jewish religious community, regardless of the extent to which they identified with this group.

Antisemitic propaganda was a common theme in Nazi propaganda. However, it was occasionally reduced for tactical reasons, such as for the 1936 Olympic Games. It was a recurring topic in Hitler's book Mein Kampf (1925–26), which was a key component of Nazi ideology.

Early in his membership in the Nazi Party, Hitler presented the Jews as behind all of Germany's moral and economic problems, as featuring in both communism and international capitalism. He blamed "money-grubbing Jews" for all of Weimar Germany's economic problems. He also drew upon the antisemitic elements of the stab-in-the-back myth to explain the defeat in World War I and to justify Nazi views as self-defense. In one speech, when Hitler asked who was behind Germany's failed war efforts, the audience erupted with "The Jews".

After the failure of the Beer Hall Putsch in November 1923, he moderated his tone for the trial, centering his defense on his selfless devotion to the good of the Volk and the need for bold action to save them; though his references to the Jews were not eliminated (speaking, for instance, of "racial tuberculosis" in "German lungs"), they were decreased to win support. Some Nazis feared their movement lost its antisemitic edge, and Hitler privately assured them that he regarded his previous views as mild. Hitler in Mein Kampf describes Jews as "a dangerous bacillus".

Afterwards, Hitler publicly muted his antisemitism; speeches would contain references to Jews, but ceased to be purely antisemitic fulminations, unless such language would appeal to the audience. Some speeches contained no references to Jews at all, leading many to believe that his antisemitism had been an earlier stage.

Still, the antisemitic planks remained in the Nazi Party platform. Even before they ascended to power, Nazi essays and slogans would call for boycotts of Jews. Jews were associated with money-lenders, usury and banks, and were portrayed as the enemy of small shopkeepers, small farmers and artisans. Jews were blamed for the League of Nations, for pacifism, for Marxism, for international capitalism, for homosexuality, for prostitution, and for the cultural changes of the 1920s.

In 1933, Hitler's speeches spoke of serving Germany and defending it from its foes: hostile countries, Communism, liberals, and culture decay, but not Jews. Seizure of power after the Reichstag fire inaugurated April 1 as the day for a boycott of Jewish stores and Hitler, on the radio and in newspapers, fervently called for it. A propaganda poster supporting the boycott declared that "in Paris, London, and New York German businesses were destroyed by the Jews, German men and women were attacked in the streets and beaten, German children were tortured and defiled by Jewish sadists", and called on Germans to "do to the Jews in Germany what they are doing to Germans abroad." The actual effect, of apathy outside Nazi strongholds, caused Nazis to turn to more incremental and subtle effects.

In 1935 the first set of antisemitic laws went into effect in Nazi Germany; the Nuremberg Laws forbid the Jews and political opponents from civil service. They classified people with four German grandparents as "German or kindred blood", while people were classified as Jews if they descended from three or four Jewish grandparents. A person with one or two Jewish grandparents was a Mischling, a crossbreed, of "mixed blood". These laws deprived Jews of German citizenship and prohibited sexual relations and marriages between Jews and other Germans. A further decree of the laws in November 1935 extended those prohibitions to "Gypsies, Negroes, and their bastard offspring" as well.

The Aryan Paragraph, which excluded Jews and other "non-Aryans" from many jobs and public offices, was officially justified with overt antisemitism, depicting Jews as have undue representation in the professions. Anti-Jewish measures were presented as defensive. Nazi speakers were instructed to say that Jews were being treated gently. Stock answers to counter-arguments were provided for them. Jews were attacked as the embodiment of capitalism. After six issues devoted to ethnic pride, Neues Volk featured an article on the types of the "Criminal Jew"; in later issues, it urged no sympathy for victims of the Nuremberg laws, while arguing that its reader could see Jewish life going on about them, unpersecuted. Goebbels defended Nazi racial policies, even claiming that the bad publicity was a mistake for Jews, because it brought forward the topic for discussion.

At the 1935 Nazi party congress rally at Nuremberg, Goebbels declared that "Bolshevism is the declaration of war by Jewish-led international subhumans against culture itself."

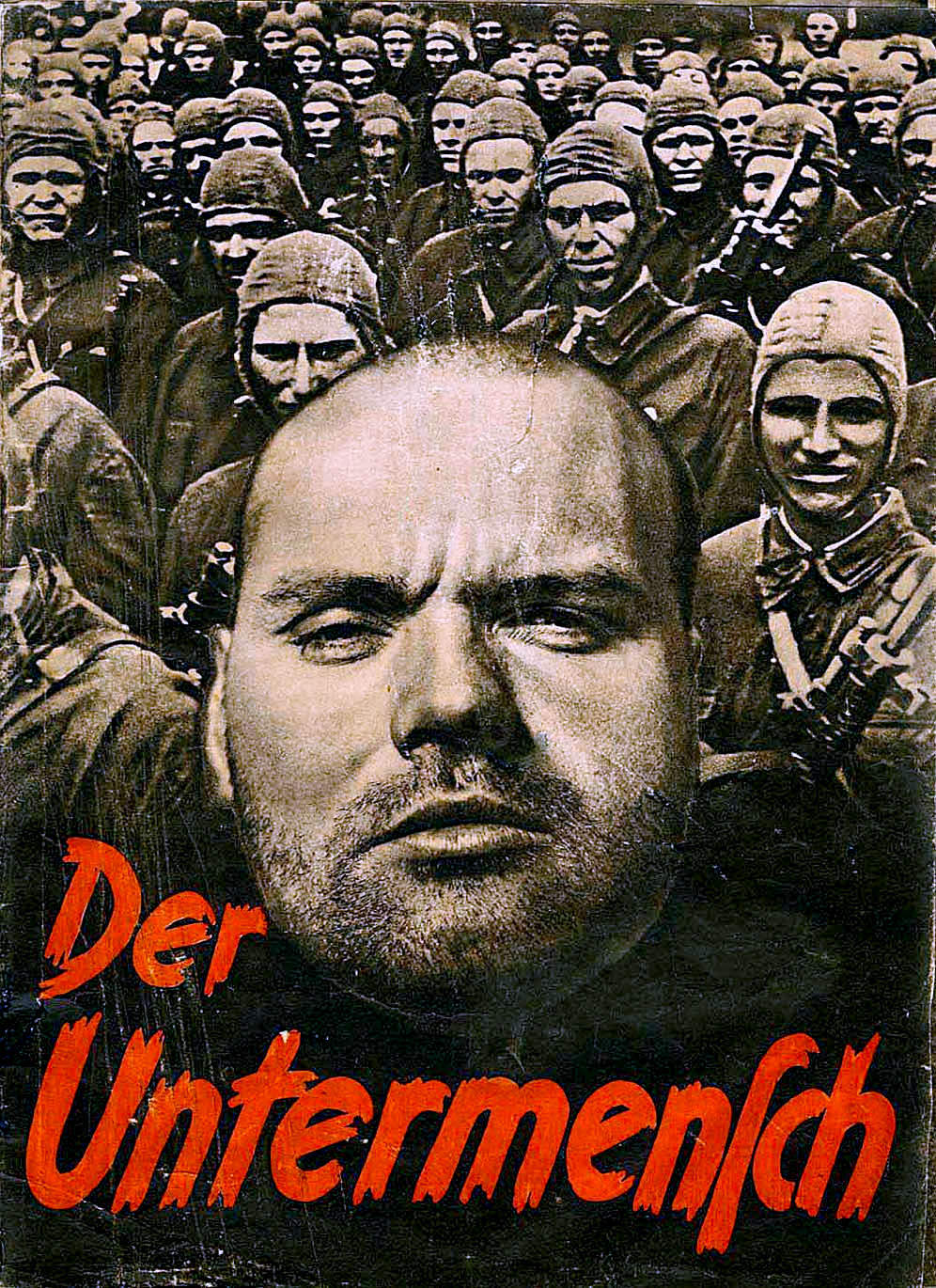
Front cover of the 1942 "Der Untermensch" (The Subhuman) pamphlet

The Nazis described the Jews as Untermenschen (subhumans); this term was utilized repeatedly in writings and speeches directed against them, the most notorious example being a 1942 SS publication with the title "Der Untermensch" which contains an antisemitic tirade. In the pamphlet "The SS as an Anti-bolshevist Fighting Organization", Himmler wrote in 1936: "We shall take care that never again in Germany, the heart of Europe, will the Jewish-Bolshevistic revolution of subhumans be able to be kindled either from within or through emissaries from without."

By the mid-1930s, textbooks with more antisemitic content were used in the class room. (This sometimes backfired, with antisemitic caricatures being so crude that the children were unable to recognize their Jewish classmates in them.) "The Jewish Question in Education" assured teachers that children were not only capable of understanding it, but that their sound racial instincts were better than their parents', as witness that the children would run and hide when a Jewish cattle dealer came to deal with their parents.

Biology classes were to emphasize the division of species in nature, to lead children to the analogy:

When migratory birds leave for the south in the fall, starlings fly with starlings, storks with storks, swallows with swallows. Although they are all birds, each holds strictly to its kind. A herd of chamois is never led by a deer or a herd of wild horses by a wild boar. Each kind sticks with its own, and seeks a leader of the same species. That is the way of nature. When these facts are explained in school, the time has to come when a boy or a girl stands up and says: "If that is the way it is in nature, it has to be the same with people. But our German people once allowed itself to be led by those of foreign race, the Jews." To older students, one can explain that a male starling mates only with a female starling. They build a nest, lay eggs, care for the chicks. Young starlings come from that nest. Like is drawn to like, and produces its own kind. That is the way nature is! Only where humanity intervenes do artificial cross-breeds result, the mixed race, the bastard. People cross a horse and a donkey to produce a mule. The mule is an example of a bastard. Nature does not want it to reproduce.

With this, teachers were informed, the logic of the Nuremberg Laws will be easy to explain.

This time also saw a vast increase in antisemitic popular culture; not bearing the overt stamp of Nazi approval, it was regarded as more objective than Ministry of Propaganda information. Even children's books such as Der Giftpilz promoted antisemitism. Academics, in view of increasing Nazi pressure, produced reams of "racial science" to demonstrate the differences between Jews and Germans, frequently ignoring all other races. In books, the measures were presented as reasonable and even self-defense. Das Schwarze Korps increased the harshness of its tone toward Jews, in order to prepare the SS for racial war. This element could also appear in other propaganda in which it was not the centerpiece. The villains of Hans Westmar were not only Communists but Jews as well.

This, however, did not reach the pitch of later propaganda, after the war. Goebbels, despite his personal racism, approved only two comedies and one historical drama with overt antisemitism. Newsreels contained no references to Jews. Propaganda aimed at women as bulwarks against racial degeneration lay heavy emphasis on their role in protecting racial purity without indulging in the antisemitism of Mein Kampf or Der Stürmer. Gerhard Wagner, at the 1936 Nuremberg Rally, discussed the racial law more in terms of the pure and growing race than the evil of the Jews. A 1938 pamphlet urging support for Hitler in the referendum detailed Nazi accomplishments with no mention of antisemitism. This reflected a desire to subtly present their racial doctrines, as apparently objective science. The ground was laid for later antisemitic works by heavy emphasis on the ethnic chauvinism. Hitler made only three overtly antisemitic speeches between seizing power and the war, but included various cryptic comments about Jews that the hardcode Nazis knew meant he had not abandoned the beliefs. Antisemitic propaganda was in particularly suppressed during the Olympics, when Der Stürmer was not allowed to be sold on the streets.

Hitler gave a speech on January 30 1939 which opened with praise for the flowering of the German people, but went on to declare his prophecy, “If international finance Jewry inside and outside Europe should succeed in plunging the nations once more into a world war, the result will be not the Bolshevization of the earth and thereby the victory of Jewry, but the annihilation of the Jewish race in Europe.” In 1942, newspapers quoted Hitler as saying that his "prediction" was being realized.

==== The Holocaust ====
In 1941, when Jews were forced to wear the Star of David, Nazi pamphlets instructed people to remember antisemitic arguments at the sight of it, particularly Kaufman's Germany Must Perish!. This book was also heavily relied on for the pamphlet "The War Goal of World Plutocracy".

The Holocaust was not a topic even for discussion in ministerial meetings; the one time the question was raised it was dismissed as being of no use in propaganda. Even officials in the Propaganda Ministry were told atrocities against Jews were enemy propaganda. But with the Holocaust, aggressive antisemitic propaganda was therefore implemented. Goebbels's articles in Das Reich included vitriolic antisemitism. The alleged documentary The Eternal Jew purported to show the wretched lives and destruction wrought by Jews, who were lower than vermin, and the historical drama Jud Süß depicted a Jew as gaining power over the Duke by lending him money and using the power to oppress his subjects and enable himself to rape a pure German woman, by having her husband arrested and tortured. Wartime posters frequently described the Jews as responsible for the war, and being behind the Allies. Fervently antisemitic pamphlets were published, including alleged citations from Jewish writing, which were generally poor translations, out of context, or invented. An attack on "Americanism" asserted that the Jews were behind it.

The difficulty of simultaneously maintaining anti-Communist propaganda, and propaganda against Great Britain as a plutocracy also led to increased emphasis on antisemitism, describing Jews as being behind both.

Instructions for propaganda speakers in 1943 directed them to claim that antisemitism was rising throughout the world, quoting an alleged British sailor as wishing Hitler would kill five million Jews, one of the clearest reference to extermination in Nazi propaganda.

==== Outside Germany ====
Antisemitic propaganda was also spread outside Germany. Ukrainians were told that they had acted against Jews many times in the past for their "high-handedness" and would now demand full payment for all injuries. Reports indicated that although the high percentage of Jews in the Communist party had its effect, the Ukrainians viewed it as a religious matter, and not a racial one.

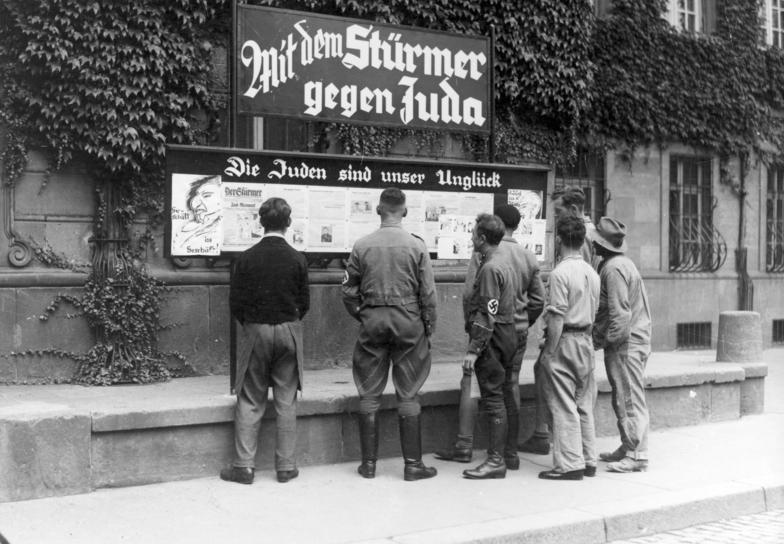
German citizens reading a public display of Der Stürmer in 1935. Above the display there are the antisemitic slogans "With Der Stürmer against Judah" and "The Jews are our misfortune".

==== In Der Stürmer ====
The propaganda periodical Der Stürmer always made antisemitic material a mainstay, throughout its run before and during Nazi power. It exemplified the crude antisemitism that Hitler concealed to win popular and foreign support, but its circulation increased throughout the Nazi regime. Even after Streicher was under house arrest for gross misuse of office, Hitler provided him with resources to continue his propaganda.

Salacious accounts of sexual offenses featured in nearly every issue. The Reichstag fire was attributed to a Jewish conspiracy. It supported an early plan to transport all Jews to Madagascar, but this prospect was dropped as soon as it became an actual possibility. Later, taking Theodore N. Kaufman with the importance that the Nazis generally attributed to him, urged that Jews intended to exterminate Germany, and urged that only with the destruction of Jews would Germany be safe.

Its "Letter Box" encouraged the reporting of Jewish acts; the unofficial style helped prevent suspicion of propaganda, and lent it authenticity.

A textbook written by Elvira Bauer in 1936, entitled Trust No Fox on his Green Heath and No Jew on his Oath, was designed to show Germans that the Jews could not be trusted. It portrayed the Jews as inferior, untrustworthy and parasitic. A further antisemitic children's book entitled The Poisonous Mushroom, written by Ernst Hiemer, was handed out in 1938. Again it portrayed the Jews as worthless subhumans and through a text containing seventeen short stories, as the antithesis of Aryan humanity. The Jew was dehumanized and was seen as a poisonous mushroom. The book included encompassed strands of both religious and racial antisemitism towards the Jews. The contents of this book were following themes "How to Tell a Jew", "How Jewish Traders Cheat", "How Jews Torment Animals", "Are there Decent Jews?" and finally "Without Solving the Jewish Question, No Salvation for Mankind".

Two years later by the same author another textbook which attacked the Jews through racial antisemitism and decrying the evils of racial miscegenation. In this text, Jews were portrayed as bloodsuckers. He claimed Jews were equal to tapeworms, claiming that "Tapeworm and Jew are parasites of the worst kind. We want their elimination. We want to become healthy and strong again. Then only one thing will help: Their extermination." The aim of such texts was to try and justify the Nazis racial policy on Jews. Der Stürmer was frequently used in schools as part of Nazi "education" to the German youth. Despite its overly antisemitic status, the paper published letters from teachers and children approving of it.

Roughly 100,000 copies were printed of the book. The title comes from a phrase by Martin Luther, whose anti-Jewish remarks the Nazis were happy to use.

=== Communists ===
Adolf Hitler's anti-communism was already a central feature of his book Mein Kampf. Nazi propaganda depicted Communism as an enemy both within Germany and all of Europe. Communists were the first group attacked as enemies of the state when Nazis ascended to power. According to Hitler, the Jews were the archetypal enemies of the German Volk, and no Communism or Bolshevism existed outside Jewry.

In a speech in 1927 to the Bavarian regional parliament the Nazi propagandist Julius Streicher, publisher of Der Stürmer, used the term "Untermensch" referring to the communists of the German Bavarian Soviet Republic: "It happened at the time of the [Bavarian] Soviet Republic: When the unleashed subhumans rambled murdering through the streets, the deputies hid behind a chimney in the Bavarian parliament."

Prior to their seizure of powers, conflicts with Communists, and attempts to win them over, featured frequently in Nazi propaganda. Newspaper articles presented Nazis as innocent victims of Communist assaults. An election flyer aimed at converting Communists. Articles advising Nazi propagandist discussed winning over the workers from the Marxists. Election slogans urged that if you wanted Bolshevism, to vote Communist, but to remain free Germans, to vote Nazi.

Goebbels, aware of the value of publicity (both positive and negative), deliberately provoked beer-hall battles and street brawls, including violent attacks on the Communist Party of Germany. He used the death of Horst Wessel who was killed in 1930 by two members of the Communist Party of Germany as a propaganda tool against "Communist subhumans".

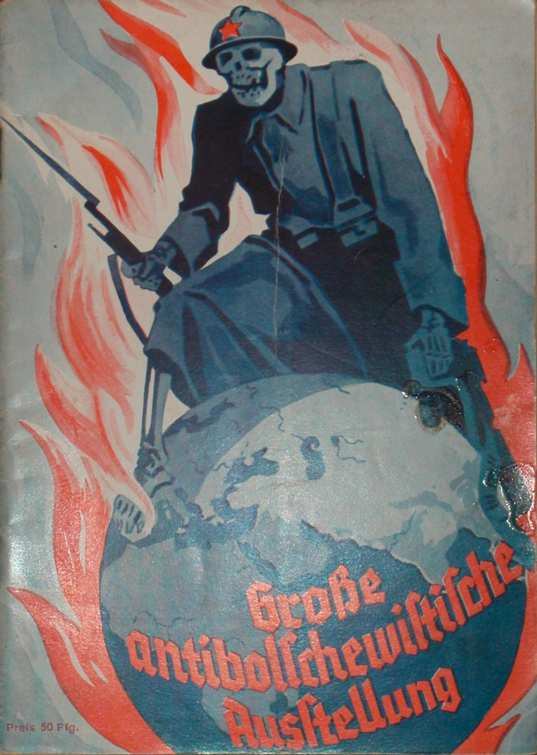
Communists, according to Goebbels, would "destroy all social order, destroy all culture and all ethnic life, creating chaos in which humanity threatens to collapse." A later illustration emphasised Judeo-Bolshevism

The spectre of Communism was used to win dictatorial powers. The Reichstag fire was presented by Nazi newspaper as the first step in a Communist seizure of power. Hitler made use of it to portray Nazis as the only alternative to the Communists, fears of which he whipped up. This propaganda resulted in an acceptance of anti-Communist violence at the time, though antisemitic violence was less approved of.

When the Pope attacked the errors of Nazism, the government's official response was a note accusing the Pope of endangering the defense against world Bolshevism.

After the Nazis came to power in 1933, Communists were among the first people that were sent to concentration camps. They were sent because of their ties with the Soviet Union and because Nazism greatly opposed Communism.

The Spanish Civil War began the propaganda of portraying Germany as a protector against "Jewish Bolshevism", making heavy use of atrocity stories.

Before the Molotov–Ribbentrop Pact, from 1936 to 1938, substantial anti-Bolshevist campaigns were conducted. In 1937 the Reichspropagandaleitung had an anti-Bolshevist exhibit travel to major cities. In film, Russian Communists were depicted as ruthless murderers. In Flüchtlinge, only a heroic German leader saves Volga Germans from Bolshevik persecution on the Sino-Russian border in Manchuria. Frisians in Peril depicts a village of Volga Germans being ruthlessly persecuted in the Soviet Union. Goebbels addressed the 1935 annual congress of the Nazi Party with an anti-Communist speech.

The first declaration of the Pact presented it as a genuine change, but this was unpalatable to the Nazi faithful and the line was soon watered down even before its violation. News reports were to be neutral on the Russian army and carefully expurgated of "typical Bolshevist phrases". Still, anti-Communist films were withdrawn.

After the invasion of the Soviet Union, propaganda resumed, quickly linking the attack with British forces, which simplified the task of attacking both Communism and "plutocracy" at once. Within two weeks of the invasion, Goebbels proclaimed the attack the preservation of European civilization from Communism. A weekly propaganda poster declared that the soldiers would liberate Europe from Bolshevism. Anti-Communist films were re-issued, and new films such as The Red Terror were issued. Guidelines issued to the army described the Soviet commissars as inhuman and hate-filled. They were also told that the Soviets took no prisoners.

This also allowed Goebbels to make use of anti-Communist propaganda to the occupied nations, portraying a Utopia protected by German versus a slave camp under Communism. The term Iron Curtain was invented to describe this state. This propaganda asserted, with blatant falsity, that Germany wanted to protect European rather than German culture, from the threat. A rare Ukrainian poster from 1941 shows people looking through a wall and telling the Ukrainians that the Soviets had built a wall around them to keep their misery invisible.

In 1942, a "Soviet Paradise" exhibit was opened to depict the Soviet Union as having been found a place of filth and poverty. This was supplemented with a pamphlet and "documentary film" of the same title.

Also in 1942, the Nazi government believed Churchill's fall was possible, which Goebbels chose to spin as England surrendering Europe to Bolshevism. This received continuing plan and was a major element in the Sportpalast speech.

Preparations were made, in anticipation of victory in Russia, to present this as the triumph over Communism.

In 1943, the defeat at Stalingrad led to a serious Anti-Bolshevist campaign in view of the possibility of defeat. The Katyn massacre was exploited in 1943 to drive a wedge between Poland, Western Allies, and the Soviet Union, and reinforce the Nazi propaganda line about the horrors of Bolshevism and American and British subservience to it. Pamphlets were released to whip up fear of Communism. The negative impact of Soviet policies implemented in the 1930s were still fresh in the memory of Ukrainians. These included the Holodomor of 1933, the Great Terror, the persecution of intellectuals during the Great Purge of 1937–38, the massacre of Ukrainian intellectuals after the annexation of Western Ukraine from Poland in 1939, the introduction and implementation of Collectivisation. As a result, the population of whole towns, cities and villages, greeted the Germans as liberators which helps explain the unprecedented rapid progress of the German forces in the occupation of Ukraine. The Ukrainians at first had been told it was being freed from Communism; this had quickly given way to exploitation, where even celebrating Kiev's "liberation" was forbidden, but the failure at Stalingrad brought propaganda into play.

Films such as Hans Westmar and Hitler Youth Quex depicted the deaths of their heroes as martyrs killed by Communism; in both films, the movement appears as an overall threat, with some ruthless villains as leaders, but with some misguided Communists who could be inspired by the heroes—as, indeed, potential Nazis. Literature, too, depicted heroic German workers who were taken in by international Marxism, but whose Aryan nature revolted on learning more of it. Der Giftpilz had a man tell Hitler Youth members that once he had been a Communist, but he had realized that they were led by Jews who were trying to sacrifice Germany for Russia's benefit.

From very early on after the invasion of the Soviet Union, permission was given to eliminate all communists:

It is necessary to eliminate the red sub-humans, along with their Kremlin dictators. German people will have a great task to perform the most in its history, and the world will hear more about that this task will be completed till the end.

— Newsletter for the troops (Mitteilungen für die Truppe), in June 1941,

=== Capitalists ===
Capitalism was also attacked as morally inferior to German values and as failing to provide for the German people. Great Britain was attacked as a plutocracy. A few months after the invasion of Poland, Goebbels released his "England’s Guilt" speech that blamed the war on Imperial Britain's "capitalist democracy" and warmongers, denouncing England for having the richest men on earth. At the same time, their people get little of this wealth. In that speech, Goebbels claimed that "English capitalists want to destroy Hitlerism" to retain its imperial status and harmful economic policies.

This was portrayed as part of a Jewish conspiracy that supposedly promoted both Communism and plutocracy, so the Nazis described Jews as being behind both. Anti-capitalist propaganda, attacking "interest slavery", used the association of Jews with money-lenders.

Nazi propaganda and officials such as Robert Ley describe Germany as a "proletarian nation" as opposed to plutocratic England, a political divide that Goebbels described as "England is a capitalist democracy" and "Germany is a socialist people's state."

Initially, Hitler wanted to have an alliance with the United Kingdom; however, after the war started, they were denounced as "the Jew among the Aryan peoples" and as plutocrats fighting for money. Another major theme was the difference between British "plutocracy" and Nazi Germany. German newspapers and newsreels often pictured photos and footage of British unemployed and slums together with unfavourable commentary about the differences in living standards of the working class of Nazi Germany vs that of the working class living under British "plutocracy". Simultaneously, propaganda presented them as tools of the Communists. A German parody of a stamp depicting King George and Queen Elizabeth replaced the queen with Stalin and added a hammer, sickle, and stars of David. The Parole der Woche weekly wall newspaper declared that the United States and Britain had agreed to let Stalin take Europe. Using propaganda to present the Jews as being behind both helped juggle the issues of opposing "plutocracy" and Communism at once.

After the invasion of the Soviet Union, propaganda resumed, quickly linking the attack with British forces, which simplified the task of attacking both Communism and "plutocracy" at once.

=== Intellectuals ===
The Nazi movement was overtly anti-rationalist, favoring appeals to emotion and cultural myths. It preferred such "non-intellectual" virtues as loyalty, patriotism, duty, purity, and blood, and allegedly produced a pervasive contempt for intellectuals. Both overt statements and propaganda in books favored sincere feeling over thought, because such feelings, stemming from nature, would be simple and direct. In Mein Kampf, Hitler complained of biased over-education, brainwashing, and a lack of instinct and will and in many other passages made his anti-intellectual bent clear. Intellectuals were frequently the butts of Hitler's jokes. Hitler Youth and the League of German Girls were overtly instructed to aim for character-building rather than education. The theory offered for Nazism was developed only after practice, which had denigrated expert thinking, only to seek out intellectuals who could be brought to support it.

Sturmabteilung speakers were used, though reliance on them sometimes offended well-educated audiences, but their blunt and folksy manner often had their own appeal. One popular Munich speaker, declaring biological research boring, called instead on racial emotions; their "healthy ethnic instincts" would reveal the quality of the Aryan type.

A 1937 essay aimed at propagandists "Heart or Reason? What We don't Want from Our Speakers", explicitly complained that speakers should aim for the heart, not the understanding, and many of them failed to try this. This included an unrelentingly optimistic view. Pure reason was attacked as a colorless thing, cut off from blood. Education Minister Rust ordered teachers training colleges to relocate from "too intellectual" university centers to the countryside, where they could be more readily indoctrinated and would also benefit from contact with the pure German peasantry.

An SS paper declared that IQ varied inversely with male infertility, and medical papers declared that the spread of educational pursuits had brought down the birth rate.

This frequently related to the blood and soil doctrines and an organic view of the German people. "Blood and soil" plays, for instance, depicted a woman rejecting her bookish fiancé in order to marry an estate owner.

It also related to antisemitism, as Jews were often accused of being intellectual and having a destructive "critical spirit". The book burnings were hailed by Goebbels as ending "the age of extreme Jewish intellectualism."

This view affected the creation of propaganda as well. Goebbels, who never tired of railing against intellectuals, told propagandists to aim their work toward the woodcutter in Bad Aibling.

Overall, these themes reflected Nazi Germany's split between myth and modernity.

=== Russians ===
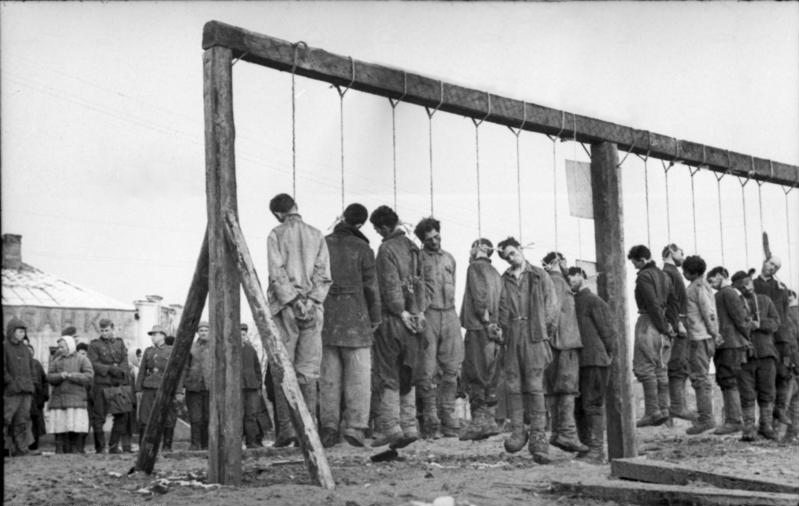
Alleged Soviet partisans hanged by German forces in January 1943

Russia was the primary target of Hitler's expansionist foreign policy. In his book, Mein Kampf, Adolf Hitler dedicated a chapter to Eastern policy and detailed his plans for gaining "living space" (Lebensraum) in the East. He called on the German people to "secure its rightful land on this earth," and announced:

We National Socialists consciously draw a line under the direction of our foreign policy war. We begin where we ended six centuries ago. We stop the perpetual Germanic march towards the south and west of Europe, and have the view on the country in the east. We finally put the colonial and commercial policy of the pre-war and go over to the territorial policy of the future. But if we speak today in Europe of new land, we can primarily only to Russia and the border states subjects him think."

Because the Russian people were Slavic, not Germanic, the Soviet Union was also attacked on racial grounds for "living space" as Nazi ideology believed that only the Nordic people (referred to as the Germanic people) represented the Herrenvolk (master race) which was to expand to the East (Drang nach Osten). To Hitler, Operation Barbarossa was a "war of annihilation", being both an ideological war between German Nazism and Jewish Bolshevism and a racial war between the Germans and the Bolshevik, Jewish, Gypsies and Slavic Untermenschen (Generalplan Ost).

Influenced by the guidelines, in a directive sent out to the troops under his command, General Erich Hoepner of the Panzer Group 4 stated:

The war against Russia is an important chapter in the German nation's struggle for existence. It is the old battle of the Germanic against the Slavic people, of the defence of European culture against Muscovite-Asiatic inundation and of the repulse of Jewish Bolshevism. The objective of this battle must be the demolition of present-day Russia and must therefore be conducted with unprecedented severity. Every military action must be guided in planning and execution by an iron resolution to exterminate the enemy remorselessly and totally. In particular, no adherents of the contemporary Russian Bolshevik system are to be spared.

Heinrich Himmler in a speech to the Eastern Front Battle Group "Nord" declared:

It is a war of ideologies and struggle races. On one side stands National Socialism: ideology, founded on the values of our Germanic, Nordic blood. It is worth the world as we want to see: beautiful, orderly, fair, socially, a world that may be, still suffers some flaws, but overall a happy, beautiful world filled with culture, which is precisely Germany. On the other side stands the 180 millionth people, a mixture of races and peoples, whose names are unpronounceable, and whose physical nature is such that the only thing that they can do – is to shoot without pity or mercy. These animals, which are subjected to torture and ill-treatment of each prisoner from our side, which do not have medical care they captured our wounded, as do the decent men, you will see them for yourself. These people have joined a Jewish religion, one ideology, called Bolshevism, with the task of: having now Russian, half [located] in Asia, parts of Europe, crush Germany and the world. When you, my friends, are fighting in the East, you keep that same fight against the same subhumans, against the same inferior races that once appeared under the name of Huns, and later – 1,000 years ago during the time of King Henry and Otto I, – the name of the Hungarians, and later under the name of Tatars, and then they came again under the name of Genghis Khan and the Mongols. Today they are called Russian under the political banner of Bolshevism.

During the war, Himmler published the pamphlet "Der Untermensch" (The Subhuman) which featured photographs of ideal Aryans contrasted with photographs of the ravages of barbarian races (Jews) from the days of Attila and Genghis Khan to massacres in the Jewish-dominated Soviet Union.

Hitler believed that after the invasion of the Soviet Union, the war in the East was to destroy Bolshevism, as well as aiming to ruin the Great Russian Empire, and a war for German expansion and economic exploitation.

Goebbels, in Das Reich, explained Russian resistance in terms of a stubborn but bestial soul. Russians were termed "Asiatic" and the Red Army as "Asiatic Hordes".

The troops were told that in World War I, the Russian troops had often feigned death or surrender, or donned German uniforms, in order to kill German soldiers.

Until early 1942 the following slogan was in use "the Russian is a beast, he must croak" (der Russe sei eine Bestie, er muesse verrecken) but the need for Russian manpower in the German labor force led to its demise.

Events such as the Nemmersdorf massacre and Metgethen massacre were also used by German propaganda to strengthen the fighting spirit on the eastern front towards the end of the war.

=== Czechs and Slovaks ===
Until the end of Czechoslovakia in March 1939, that state was a major target of abuse. Czechoslovakia was represented as an "abomination" created by the Treaty of Versailles, an artificial state that should never had been created. Moreover, Czechoslovakia was frequently accused of engaging in some sort of genocide against the ethnic Germans of the Sudetenland with German media making recurrent and false claims of massacres of Sudetenlanders. In addition, the Czechoslovak-Soviet treaty of 1935 was represented as an aggressive move aimed at Germany. A particular favourite claim was that Czechoslovakia was a "Soviet air-craft carrier" in Central Europe, namely that were secret Red Air Force bases in Czechoslovakia that would allow the Soviets to bomb and destroy German cities. The high-point of anti-Czechoslovak propaganda was in 1938 with the crisis that ended in the Munich Agreement.

=== Poles ===
At first, Hitler and the Nazis saw Poland as a potential ally against the Soviet Union, Hitler repeatedly suggested a German-Polish alliance against the Soviet Union, but Piłsudski declined, instead seeking precious time to prepare for potential war with Germany or with the Soviet Union. Eventually in January 1934 the German–Polish Non-Aggression Pact was signed and all attacks against Poland ceased. A sign of the change occurred in 1933 when a German professor published a book that was given much media attention calling for German-Polish friendship, and praised the "particularly close political and cultural relationship" between Germany and Poland that was said to be 1,000 years old.

For many years, it was forbidden to discuss the German minority in Poland, and this continued through into early 1939, even while newspapers were asked to press the matter of Danzig. The reasons for this lay with the German–Polish Non-Aggression Pact of 1934, an attempt on the part of Germany to split the Cordon sanitaire as the French alliance system in Eastern Europe was known. Propaganda attacks on Poland would inspire the Poles to doubt the sincerity of Germany's policy of rapprochement with Poland. In 1935, when two secretaries at the German War Ministry were caught providing state secrets to their lover, a Polish diplomat, the two women were beheaded for high treason while the diplomat was declared persona non grata. Through the two women were widely vilified in the German press for engaging in espionage on behalf of a "foreign power", the name of the "foreign power" was never mentioned in order to maintain good relations with Poland. At the same time, the loss of territory to Poland under the Treaty of Versailles was widely resented in Germany, and under the Weimar Republic, no German government had willing to recognize the frontiers with Poland, with many Germans being unwilling to accept legitimacy of Poland at all. In inter-war Germany, anti-Polish feelings ran high. The American historian Gerhard Weinberg observed that for many Germans in the Weimar Republic, Poland was an abomination, whose people were seen as "an East European species of cockroach". Poland was usually described as a Saisonstaat (a state for a season). In inter-war Germany, the phrase polnische Wirtschaft (Polish economy) was the expression Germans used to describe any situation that was a hopeless muddle. Weinberg noted that in the 1920s, every leading German politician refused to accept Poland as a legitimate nation, and hoped instead to partition Poland with the Soviet Union. The Nazis were not prepared to be seen as less tough with Poland than the Weimar Republic, so until 1939 the topic of Poland was simply avoided.

Nazi propaganda demanded that Danzig should be returned to Germany. Since the Treaty of Versailles separated Danzig (Polish: Gdańsk) from Germany and it became part of the semi-autonomous city-state Free City of Danzig. The population rose from 357,000 (1919) to 408,000 in 1929, according to the official census 95% of whom were Germans. Germans who favored reincorporation into Germany received political and financial support from the Nazi regime. Nazi Germany officially demanded the return of Danzig to Germany along with an extraterritorial (meaning under German jurisdiction) highway through the area of the Polish Corridor for land-based access between those parts of Germany. There was a lot of German pro-Nazi supporters in Danzig, in the early 1930s the local Nazi Party capitalized on pro-German sentiments and in 1933 garnered 50% of vote in the parliament. Hitler used the issue of the status of the city as a pretext for attacking Poland and in May 1939, during a high-level meeting of German military officials explained to them: It is not Danzig that is at stake. For us it is a matter of expanding our Lebensraum in the east, adding that there will be no repeat of the Czech situation, and Germany will attack Poland at first opportunity, after isolating the country from its Western Allies. As the Nazi demands increased, German-Polish relations rapidly deteriorated.

In the spring of 1939, just before the invasion of Poland, a major anti-Polish campaign was launched, asserting such claims as forced labor of ethnic Germans, persecution of them, Polish disorder, Poles provoking border incidents, and aggressive intentions from its government. Newspapers wrote copiously on the issue. In such films as Heimkehr, depicted Polish ethnic Germans as deeply persecuted—often with recognizable Nazi tactics—and the invasion as necessary to protect them.

In attempts to try and justify the Nazis invasion of Poland, Goebbels produced photographs and other evidence for allegations that ethnic Germans had been massacred by Poles. Bloody Sunday was presented in the manner most favorable to Nazi propaganda. The nazis used the Gleiwitz incident to justify their invasion of Poland, although the incident was set up by Himmler and Heydrich using concentration camp inmates dressed in Polish uniforms' It was alleged that the Poles had attacked a German radio station using the prisoners, who were all murdered at the scene.

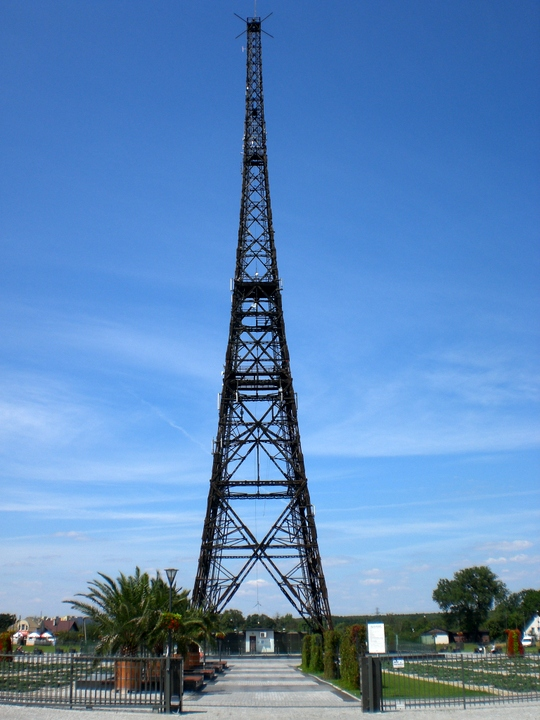
Gliwice Radio Tower today. It was where the Germans staged the Gleiwitz incident to justify invasion of Poland in 1939.

Germany invaded Poland on September 1 after having signed a non-aggression pact with the Soviet Union in late August. The German attack began in Danzig, with a bombardment of Polish positions at Westerplatte by the German battleship Schleswig-Holstein, and the landing of German infantry on the peninsula. Outnumbered Polish defenders at Westerplatte resisted for seven days before running out of ammunition. Meanwhile, after a fierce day-long fight (1 September 1939), defenders of the Polish Post office were tried and executed then buried on the spot in the Danzig quarter of Zaspa in October 1939. In 1998 a German court overturned their conviction and sentence. The city was officially annexed by Nazi Germany and incorporated into the Reichsgau Danzig-West Prussia.

The death of some Polish cavalry soldiers, caused by tanks, created a myth that they had attacked the tanks, which German propaganda used to promote German superiority.

Nazi propaganda in October 1939 told Germans to view all ethnic Poles, Gypsies (Romani) and Jews on the same level as Untermenschen.

To prevent such anti-Polish stigma, when Polish children were kidnapped for Germanization, official orders forbade making the term "Germanizable Polish children" known to the public. They were referred to as "Polonized German children" or "Children of German descent" or even "German orphans". Germans were informed that the children's birth certificates had been falsified, to show them as Poles and rob them of their German heritage.

=== The British ===
The position of Nazi propaganda towards the United Kingdom changed over time in keeping with Anglo-German relations. Prior to 1938, as the Nazi regime attempted to court the British into an alliance, Nazi propaganda praised the "Aryan" character of the British people and the British Empire. However, as Anglo-German relations deteriorated and the Second World War broke out, Nazi propaganda vilified the British as oppressive, German-hating plutocrats. During the war, it accused "perfidious Albion" of war crimes, and sought to drive a wedge between Britain and France.

=== Americans ===
Anti-American propaganda dealt heavily with a lack of "ethnic unity" in the United States. The Land Without A Heart portrayed it as a racial mishmash where good people were destroyed. American culture was portrayed as childish, and Americans as unable to appreciate European culture. An article "America as a Perversion of European Culture", itself classified, was provided for use by propagandists. This drew on a long tradition, from the time of German Romanticism, that America was kulturlose Gesellschaft, a society incapable of culture.

Goebbels gave a speech on American negative reactions to anti-Jewish campaigns in 1938, to call for their stopping their criticism.

Hitler declared America as a "mongrel nation", grown too rich too soon and governed by a capitalist elite with strong ties to the Jews and the Americans were a "mongrel people" incapable of higher culture or great creative achievements.

Newspapers were warned, soon after war broke out, to avoid portraying news in a manner that would embarrass American isolationists, and that the United States was considerably more hostile than it had been before World War I. Efforts were made to minimize the future shock of America's joining the war, which had produced a great impact in 1918, and were generally successful. As with the British, the claim was made that the war had been forced on Germany by America.

In 1943 the Katyn massacre was used to portray American and British governments as subservient to Communism.

Theodore N. Kaufman's 1941 book Germany Must Perish was used to portray America as seeking to destroy Germany.

== Values ==
In May 1938, Life observed that more than 99% of German and Austrian voters had supported the Anschluss. Although there had been irregularities, the magazine acknowledged that the results were "largely honest". It then discussed "the real effectiveness of Nazi demagogy" in obtaining such results:

Its secret is to deal with the people not as individuals but as crowds. The message to the crowd is a series of simple, basic, memorable words — nation, people, blood, family, comrade, friend, home, soil, bread, work, strength, hope, life, fight, victory, birth, death, honor, beauty. The Party is set up as having a monopoly on giving the people these virtues and good things. To a people whose immediate past has been hard, muddled and apparently irremediable, simple emotional words have an immense, reverberating authority. But most of all the little man who is lost and friendless in a complex, lonely modern society is treated as important, if only in the mass.

=== Action ===
As a counterpoint to their anti-intellectualism, the Nazis heavily favored action. Manuals for school teachers, under "Literature", instructed that since only the vigorous were educationally valuable, anything that discouraged manliness was to be avoided. William Shakespeare's Hamlet, while not actually forbidden, was denounced for "flabbiness of soul".

Leni Riefenstahl's Der Sieg des Glaubens glorified the mass adulation of Adolf Hitler at the Nuremberg rally of 1933, although the propaganda film was later deleted and banned following the murder of Röhm in the Night of the Long Knives. She also produced Triumph of the Will, her film of the 1934 rally, which gave greater prominence to the SS.

Women, too, were expected to be strong, healthy, and vital, despite being primarily mothers; a photograph subtitled "Future Mothers" showed teenaged girls dressed for sport and bearing javelins. A sturdy peasant woman, who worked the land and bore strong children, was an ideal, contributing to praise for athletic women tanned by outdoor work. Das deutsche Mädel was less adventure-oriented than the boy's Der Pimpf, but far more emphasis was laid on strong and active German women than in NS-Frauen-Warte.

=== Death and sacrifice ===
Heroic death was often portrayed in Nazi propaganda as glorious. It was glorified in such films as Flüchtlinge, Hans Westmar, and Kolberg. Wunschkonzert, though chiefly about the homefront, features one character who dies playing the organ in a church in order to guide his comrades, though he knows the enemy forces will also find him. The dead of World War I were also portrayed as heroic; in a film of Operation Michael, the general tells a major that they will be measured by the greatness of their sacrifice, not by that of their victory, and in Leave on Parole, the people are portrayed as being corrupted by pacifist slogans while soldiers stand their ground unflinching. Even the film Morgenrot, predating the Nazi seizure of power and containing such un-Nazi matters as a woman refusing to rejoice because of the sufferings on the other side, praised such deaths and found favor among Nazi officials for it. Karl Ritter's films, aimed on youth, were "military education" and glorified death in battle.

Propaganda about the Volk depicted it as a greater entity to which the individual belonged, and one worth dying for. The effect was such that a Jewish woman, reflecting on her longing to join the League of German Girls, concluded that it had been the admonition for self-sacrifice that had drawn her most. This call for self-sacrifice and not individuality was praised by many Germans.

Several dead stormtroopers were singled out for glorification by Goebbels, especially Horst Wessel. His posthumous fame stemmed from his "martyr's death" and Goebbel's selection of him to glorify among the many Storm-Troppers who died. While the film Hans Westmar had to be fictionalized to omit details not palatable with the Nazis in power, it was among the first films to depict dying for Hitler as dying for Germany and glorious. His decision to go to the streets is presented as fighting "the real battle". The films Hitler Youth Quex and S.A.-Mann Brand also glorified those had died in the struggle to seize power; Quex was based on a novel that sold over 200,000 copies over two years. Soldiers and street fighters were the heroes of the Nazi movement—those who had died or might die. Even the 1936 anthem for "Olympic youth" celebrated not sports but sacrificial death.

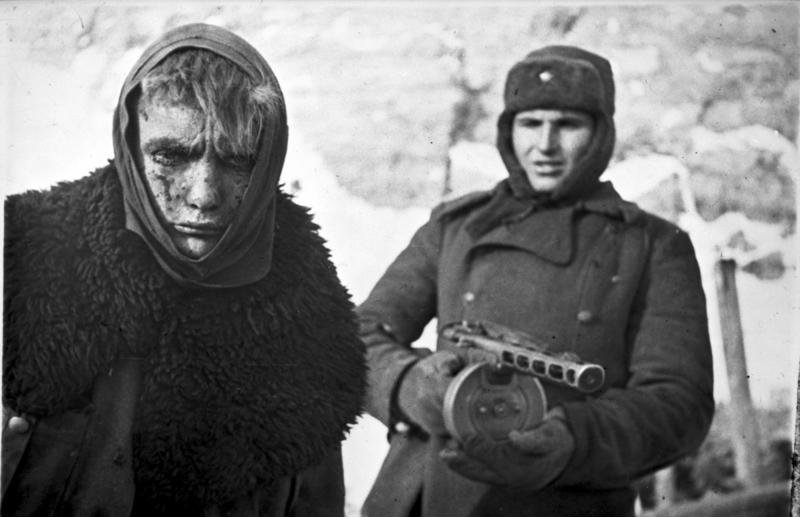
A Red Army soldier marches a German soldier into captivity.

This continued in the war. In 1942–3, the Winter Relief booklets recounted the stories of 20 decorated war heroes.

The dead of the Battle of Stalingrad were portrayed as heroes of Valhalla, not as having failed but as having held back Russian regiments. A 1944 Mother's Day Card, particularly intended for the wives and mothers of the war dead, presented a mystical view that, although there was no afterlife, the dead continued in the life that followed them. Similarly, Die grosse Liebe depicted its self-centered heroine learning to bravely send the air force lieutenant she loves back to his squadron. The battle was seen by others outside Germany as the turning point in the defeat of Hitler.

Goebbels attempted to contrast German heroism with Douglas MacArthur's flight, accusing him of cowardice—somewhat ineffectually, as the Germans knew he had been ordered to leave.

The creation of the Volkssturm had propagandists make full use of themes of death, transcendence, and commemoration to encourage the fight.

While men were the ones depicted as dying for Germany, women were also presented as needing to sacrifice. Exercise was praised as making young women strong, able to do hard physical labor for their country at need, particularly in agriculture, where the blood and soil ideology glamorized hard labor at the farm. This was not, however, translated in strong propaganda for women to join the workforce during the war; NS-Frauenschaft, in its magazine NS-Frauen-Warte and the speeches of Gertrud Scholtz-Klink, urged such behavior, and collections of essays praised heroic German women of the past, but the propaganda was weak and not widespread or repeated. Part of the problem may have been that the German government had called for sacrifice incessantly since 1931, and could bring no new appeal to it with the outbreak of war.

Women, and other civilians, were also called on by Goebbels to reduce their standard of living to that of soldiers and civilians living in bombed areas, so as to sacrifice that material for total mobilization.

Teachers' guidelines instructed that since people with hereditary weaknesses were personally innocent, their voluntary submission to sterilization was a great sacrifice for the good of the people, and they should not be treated with contempt.

=== Führerprinzip ===
Many propaganda films developed the importance of the Führerprinzip or leader principle. Flüchtlinge depicted Volga German refugees were saved from persecution by a leader, who demands their unquestioning obedience. Der Herrscher altered its source material to depict its hero, Clausen, as the unwavering leader of his munitions firm, who, faced with his children's machinations, disowns them and bestows the firm on the state, confident that a worker will arise capable of continuing his work and, as a true leader, needing no instruction.

In schools, adolescent boys were presented with Nordic sagas as the illustration of Führerprinzip, which was developed with such heroes as Frederick the Great and Otto von Bismarck. Hitler Youth in particular indoctrinated for blind obedience and "Führer worship".

This combined with the glorification of the one, central Führer. At the time of the Beer Hall Putsch, he used his trial to present himself, claiming it had been his sole responsibility and inspiring the title Fuhrer. During the Night of Long Knives, his decisive action saved Germany, though it meant (in Goebbels's description) suffering "tragic loneliness" from being a Siegfried forced to shed blood to preserve Germany. A speech explicitly proclaims, "The Führer is always right". Booklets given out for the Winter Relief donations included The Führer Makes History, a collection of Hitler photographs, and The Führer’s Battle in the East 2. Films such as The March to the Führer and Triumph of the Will glorified him.

Carl Schmitt, drawn to the Nazi party by his admiration for a decisive leader, praised him in his pamphlet State, Volk and Movement because only the ruthless will of such a leader could save Germany and its people from the "asphalt culture" of modernity, to bring about unity and authenticity.

=== Volksgemeinschaft ===
The Volksgemeinschaft or people's community received a great deal of propaganda support, a principle that the Nazis continually reiterated. The Volk were not just a people; a mystical soul united them, and propaganda continually portrayed individuals as part of a great whole, worth dying for. This was portrayed as overcoming distinctions of party and social class. A common Nazi mantra declared they must put "collective need ahead of individual greed"—a widespread sentiment in this era. The commonality this created across classes was among the great appeals of Nazism.

After the failure of the Beer Hall Putsch, Hitler, on the trial, omitted his usual pre-putsch antisemitism and centered his defense on his selfless devotion to the good of the Volk and the need for bold action to save them. The Versailles settlement had betrayed Germany, which they had tried to save. Thereafter, his speeches concentrated on his boundless devotion to the Volk, though not eliminating the antisemitism. Even once in power, his immediate speeches spoke of serving Germany.

The Volksgemeinschaft was also used for war support. Film on the home-front during World War II, depicted the war uniting all levels of society, as in the two most popular films of the Nazi era, Die grosse Liebe and Wunschkonzert. Failure to support the war was an anti-social act; this propaganda managed to bring arms production to a peak in 1944.

=== Blood and soil ===
Closely related to the community was the notion of blood and soil, a mystical bond between the German people and Germanic lands. A true Volkish life was rural and agrarian, rather than urban, a theme predating the Nazis but heavily used by them. It was foundational to the concept of Lebensraum. Prior to their ascension to power, Nazis called for a movement back to the rural areas, from the cities (which conflicted with the rearmament and its need for urbanization). "Blood and soil" novels and theater celebrated the farmer's life and human fertility, often mystically linking them.

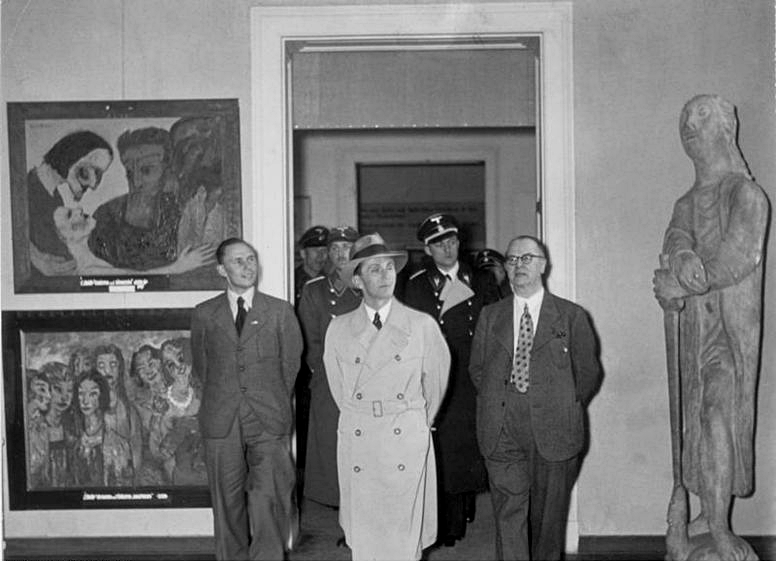
Goebbels views the Degenerate Art exhibition in 1937

Neues Volk displayed demographic charts to deplore the destruction of the generous Aryan families' farmland and how the Jews were eradicating traditional German peasantry. Posters for school depicted and deplored the flight of people from the countryside to the city. Der Giftpilz, a children's book, included an account of a Jewish financier forcing a German to sell his farm.

Carl Schmitt argued that a people would develop laws appropriate to its "blood and soil" because authenticity required loyalty to the Volk over abstract universals.

The charge laid against degenerate art was that it had been cut off from blood and soil. Landscape paintings were featured most heavily in the Greater German Art Exhibitions, to depict the German people's Lebensraum. Peasants were also popular images, promoting a simple life in harmony with nature.

Blut und Boden films likewise stressed the commonality of Germaness and the countryside. Die goldene Stadt has the heroine running away to the city; after becoming pregnant, she drowns herself. Her last words beg her father to forgive her for not loving the countryside as he did.

The Rhineland Bastards, children of German mothers and black fathers from French occupying troops, received so much propaganda attention as diluting German blood prior to the Nazi seizure of power that a census finding only 145 seemed an embarrassment.

Anti-American propaganda dealt heavily with a lack of "ethnic unity" in the United States.

=== Racial pride ===
A teacher showing in biology class the differences between Germans and the Jews

The Nazis went to great measures on teaching the German youth to be proud of their race through biology teaching, the National Socialist Teachers League (NSLB) in particular taught in schools that they should be proud of their race and not to mix.

Race biology was meant to encourage the Germans to maintain their racial purity. The NSLB stressed the Nordic racial element of the German Volk (people) and contrasted it with racial differences to foreign peoples such as the Jews. This could be done without necessarily being antisemitic. Nazi racial policy did not always included the degrading of Jews, but had to always maintain the importance of German blood and the Aryan race.

This was often connected to the blood and soil ideology. While young Germans were being taught about the importance of one's blood, they were also taught about the dangers that the Jews represented in Germany and Germany's necessary living space in the East, in particular Russia.

Novels portrayed the Germans as uniquely endowed and possessors of a unique destiny. The segregation of races was said to be natural, just as separate species did not come together in nature. Racial biology was often emphasizing on the "Jewish Question" by showing children how species did not cohabit.

School textbooks, posters and films emphasized differences between Germans and Jews, between the Aryan master race and the untrustworthy, parasitic and inferior subhumans (Untermenschen). Although the propaganda aimed at racial preservation was aimed at the youth, adults also were subject since the mid-1930s, to the belief that Jews (including women and children) were not only dangerous to Germany but also subhuman.

In 1935, the Nuremberg Laws made any sexual relations between Aryans and non-Aryans a criminal offence. Aryans that were found guilty under the laws and charged with Rassenschande ("racial shame") faced incarceration in a concentration camp, while non-Aryans could face the death penalty.

In 1922, German race researcher and eugenicist of the Weimar Republic and the Third Reich era, Hans Günther published a book titled Rassenkunde des deutschen Volkes (Racial Science of the German People). In the book, Günther recognizes the Germans as being composed of five different Aryan racial subtypes: Nordic, Mediterranean, Alpine, East Baltic, and Dinaric, he viewed the Nordic Germans as being at the top of the racial hierarchy. The book provided photographs of Germans defined as Nordic in areas such as Salzburg and Bedan; and provided photographs of Germans identified as Alpine and Mediterranean types, especially in Vorarlberg and Bavaria. The book strongly influenced the racial policy of Nazi Party; Adolf Hitler was so impressed by the work, that he made it the basis of his eugenics policy.

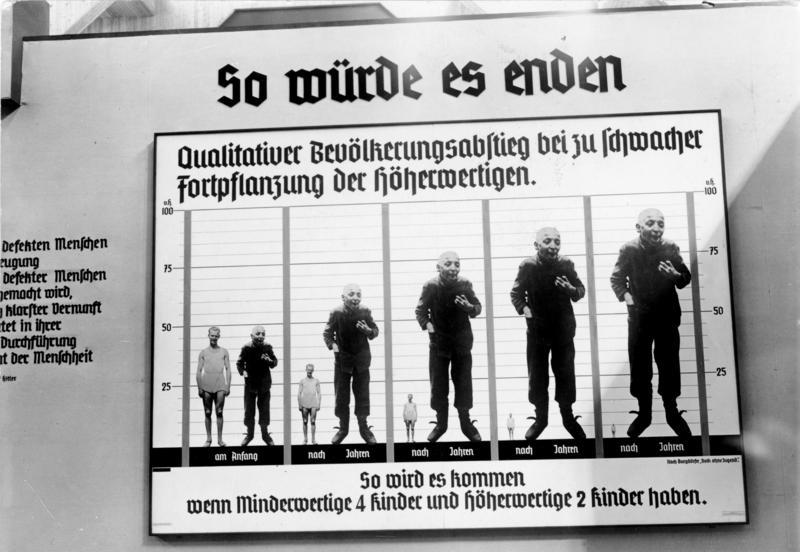
Poster of racist propaganda on the occasion of the "Wonders of Life" exhibition, organized in 1935 in Berlin

The Nazis often described the Germans as being the Ubermenschen (superhumans) Aryan master race. This also created their idea of the Untermenschen (subhumans), in particular this was aimed at Jews and Roma (Gypsies). The Nazis encouraged the Germans not to race mix and that only racially pure Aryans should be allowed to breed. As soon as the Nazis came to power in 1933 they introduced "racial hygienist" policies such as the July 1933 "Law for the Prevention of Hereditarily Diseased Offspring" which made sterilisation compulsory to the people who were said to have a range of conditions that were said to be hereditary. This later developed the Nazi regimes euthanasia program in 1939 known as the Action T4 program, the main purpose of this program was to improve the Aryan race through racial hygiene and eugenics and get rid of the "hereditarily ill". The German youth learned that the blond, tall, slender, and straight figures (Nordic) was the more "pure" and the ideal Aryan type that they were supposed to be and that the dark, small, thick, and bent bodies of the inferior races (Jews) were people they should not race mix with. They were taught to have nothing to do with them and view them as subhumans. Although the physical ideal for the Nazis was the Nordic-Aryan, contrary to popular belief they did not discriminate against individuals who did not have these features (light hair and light eyes), as long as the individual could prove their ancestry to be Aryan in accordance to the Nuremberg Laws.

On trial after the Beer Hall Putsch, foregoing his usual antisemitic speeches, Hitler presented his involvement as a springing from a deep love of the Volk. His speeches centered the glorification of the German people and their virtue. Though lowering or even omitting entirely references to Jews, this laid the ground for later antisemitic propaganda by emphasizing the need to protect the people against all foes.

This continued after the seizure of power. One popular Munich speaker, declaring biological research boring, called instead on racial emotions; their "healthy ethnic instincts" would reveal the quality of the Aryan type. Propaganda aimed at women as particular bulwarks against racial degeneration included not their selections of husbands (which lay far more emphasis on racial purity than antisemitic propaganda), but their making a German home, cooking German food, singing German songs, and thereby installing in children a love of Germany. Articles discussed the architecture of a German home, and its interior decoration and the holidays celebrated in it.

The overturning of the rule of law was justified on the grounds that law stemmed from the "right to life of the people".

Walter Gross, as head of the National Socialist Office for Enlightenment on Population Policy and Racial Welfare, oversaw a massive propaganda effort to increase ethnic consciousness; this was termed "enlightenment" rather than "propaganda" by Nazi authorities, because it was not a call for immediate action but a long-term change in attitude. Gross described the view to be undermined as people thinking of themselves as individuals rather than single links in the great chain of life. The first six issues presented solely ethnic pride, before bringing in any matter of "undesirables".

Bernhard Rust informed teachers that their task was to educate ethnically aware Germans. His ministry prescribed that no child was to graduate without knowledge of race and inheritance, and what obligations this prescribed for him. Many teachers minimized the teachings about Jews and emphasized those of the Volk, producing an effect more insidious than the less palatable lessons.

Many Nazi speakers muted antisemitic themes for general audiences, to instead dwell on the ethnic excellence of the Germans. Gerhard Wagner, at the 1936 Nuremberg Rally, discussed the racial law more in terms of the pure and growing race than the evil of the Jews.

The immensely popular "Red Indian" stories by Karl May were permitted despite the heroic treatment of the hero Winnetou and "colored" races; instead, the argument was made that the stories demonstrated the fall of the Red Indians was caused by a lack of racial consciousness, to encourage it in the Germans.

In 1939, Hitler's January 30 speech, which threatened to destroy Jews as the authors of any coming war, opened with praise for the flowering of the German people, and declare that whatever was detrimental to the people could not be ethical.

Goebbels's 1941 Christmas speech was devoted to the greatness of Germans and their certain victory rather than the war. One attack on the United States was that their childish and shallow culture meant they could not fathom the value of the European culture that Germany protected. Goebbels indeed urged Germans to not let their refined sense of justice be exploited by the enemy. He also used the opening of the German Art Exhibition during the war to argue for Germany's culture and the barbarianism of their foes.

=== Children ===
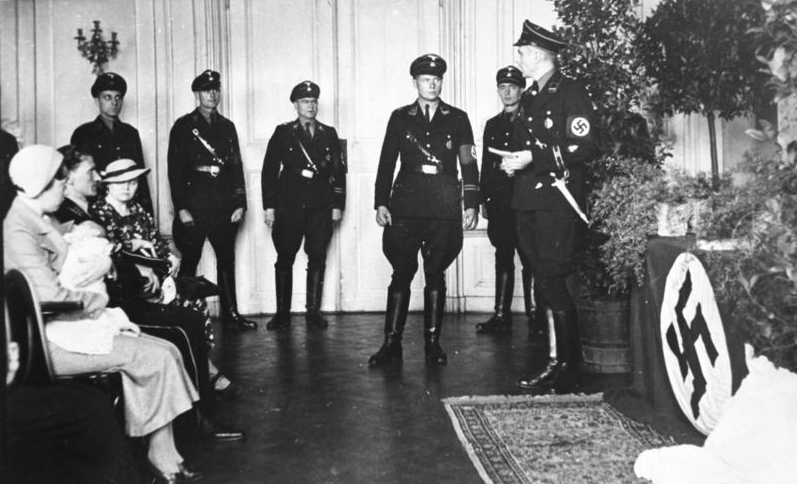
Christening of a Lebensborn child, c.1936–1944

Nazi propaganda emphasized that the Aryan race could only continue through the children for the future generations. Children were taught that they were biologically superior and were the Übermensch (superhuman) master race. "Blood and soil" was said to be part of nature. Textbooks discussed how the prolific Slav nations would cause the German people to be overrun. A woman was taught through education that she should bear as many children as possible for the next future generation's master race.

A pamphlet "You and Your People", given to children at fourteen, when they left school, urged on them their unity with the Volk, their ancestry, and the vital importance of their marrying within their own race and having many children. Similarly, "The Educational Principles of the New Germany", an article published in a magazine for women, discussed the importance of youth for the future, and how they must learn of the importance of their people and fatherland. Propaganda presented that great men were one of many siblings, or had many children. Kindersegen, blessed with children, was widely used while desiring no or few children was denounced as stemming from "an asphalt civilization. August 12th was set aside to honor mothers, particularly those with many children. Neues Volk ridiculed childless couples.

The claimed causes for this low birthrate were not always the same; the Völkischer Beobachter featured a minor controversy, about whether it stemmed from the economic situation, such that women who wanted children were denied them, or from the corrupting effects of liberalism and Marxism, which stripped men and women of a desire for children and could only be countered with spiritual renewal. In either case, Nazism was presented as the cure, restoring the economy of Germany, or engaging in a spiritual renewal.

As the theory called only for parents of good blood, propaganda attempts were made to destigmatize illegitimate births, although the Lebensborn homes were presented to the public as places for married women.

This, of course, applied only to those who selected proper partners as the parents of their children. In the movie Friesennot, depicting ethnic Germans persecuted in the Soviet Union, a half-Friesan woman is murdered for her association with a Russian man, as her German blood outweighs her Russian blood. Her murder is presented as in accordance with ancient Germanic custom for "race pollution". Similarly, when the Sudeten German heroine of Die goldene Stadt allows herself to be seduced and impregnated by a Czech, she drowns herself. Even fairy tales were put to use for this purpose, with Cinderella being presented as a tale of how the prince's racial instincts lead him to reject the stepmother's alien blood for the racially pure maiden. This propaganda showed its effects in the marriage advertisements, which decreased money considerations for eugenic ones, with the advertisers representing themselves as and asking for "Nordic" or "Aryan".

In wartime, the NS-Frauen-Warte urged women to nevertheless have children to maintain their race. Propaganda urging that SS members leave an "heir" behind, without regards to whether they were married to the mother, raised a furor, but despite backpedaling, produced a surge in illegitimate births. This, of course, still applied only to children of German parents; repeated efforts were made to propagate Volksturm, racial consciousness, to prevent sexual relations between Germans and foreign slave workers. Pamphlets, for instance, enjoined all German women to avoid sexual relations with all foreign workers brought to Germany as a danger to their blood. The League of German Girls was particularly regarded as instructing girls to avoid Rassenschande or racial defilement, which was treated with particular importance for young females.

=== Motherhood ===
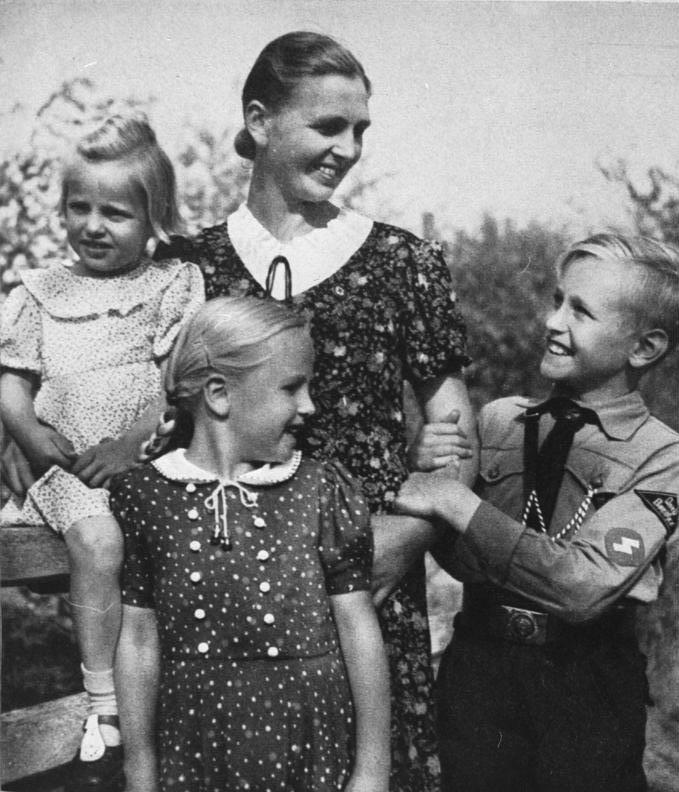
Nazi propaganda photo: A mother, her daughters and her son in the uniform of the Hitler Youth pose for the magazine SS-Leitheft February 1943.

During the era of the Nazi Party in Germany, policies and propaganda encouraged German women to contribute to the Third Reich through motherhood. To build the Third Reich, the Nazis believed that a strong German people, who acted as a foundation, was essential to the success of Nazi Germany. Motherhood propaganda was implemented by the Nazis to build the German nation. Within this propaganda there were three main arguments that were used.

The first argument that was used in Nazi motherhood propaganda was that German mothers were expected to produce as many children as possible. The mother of Nazi Germany was glorified in visual propaganda. 'Marriage loans' were also created and promoted through propaganda, and these were for recently married couples to fund a baby. These loans were to be used as "vouchers for furniture and other household goods, provided, of course, that the women gave up work on marriage and devoted herself to motherhood". In order to ensure the success of these marriage loans, there were increased taxes for single people and couples without children.

Another use of Nazi propaganda was that they wanted women to have as many Aryan children that they could bear to make a future for the next generations master race. The encouragement of by the Nazis came to its peak in 1939 with the introducing of "The Honor Cross of the German Mother" which went to mothers who provided an "important service" for the German nation. The cross was put into three different categories (bronze, silver, gold), a mother who had four or five children earned her bronze cross, whilst a mother who had six or seven children earned her silver cross and the mother who had eight or more children earned her gold cross. Mother's Day in May 1939 saw three million German mothers be honored the Mutterkreuz (Mother's Cross) whilst their husbands were preparing for the war.

The ideology of a "good mother" in Nazi Germany is described by Rupp "As a mother of her family, she meets the demands of the nation, as a housewife she acts according to the laws of the nation’s economic order, as employed woman she joins in the overall plan of the national household…But her life, like that of the man, is in its major outlines determined by the binding law that everything must be subordinated to the profit of the people". This illustrates how the Third Reich used motherhood propaganda to build up the German nation.

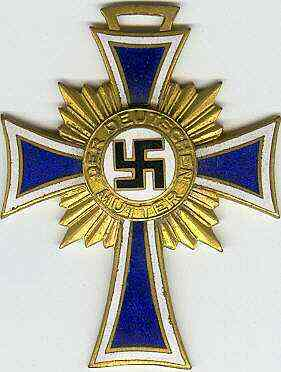
Mother's Cross

The second argument within German propaganda is that racially desirable German women were supported in their effort to have children; however undesirable mothers, such as Jews and gypsies, were discouraged from having more children. This was because Nazi Germany wanted to eradicate ‘undesirable’ populations from the Third Reich. If women did not produce desirable children, they were subject to shaven heads, pillorying, public humiliation and execution. Some women were even used a propaganda themselves, and were forced to wear signs in public that said "I have committed racial treason" or "I fornicate with Jews." Great importance was placed on the women's ability to choose desirable mates and have many desirable children.

The third argument used in Nazi motherhood propaganda created an ideal Nazi woman, which implicitly encouraged women to always be mothers in one way or another.

The first way that this ideal was created was through the construction of spiritual motherhood in Nazi propaganda. German women who were not able to have children were encouraged, through propaganda, to participate in spiritual, rather than physical, maternity by doing womanly work. Their contributions to the war came in the form of mothering German society. Spiritual maternity allowed all women to fulfill their most important duty as caregivers.

The next way that motherhood towards Germany was created through Nazi propaganda was through the ideal German woman. This ideal was portrayed by women contained in the propaganda who were "broad-hipped women, unencumbered by corsets, who could easily bear children." Because of this ideal Nazi women was fit and strong, they were typically shown in the propaganda "working in the fields, doing calisthenics, and practicing trades, as well as caring for children, cooking, and working at other more typical ‘womanly’ tasks."

These propaganda appeals effectively persuaded German women because it contained the right mixture of traditional ideas, myths of the past, and the acceptance of the needs of a modern economy and lifestyle. Women, while not regarded as equals in Nazi Germany, were noted for their ability to help create and shape a strong Third Reich, and this is portrayed in the motherhood propaganda used by the Nazi government.

== Policies ==
=== Heim ins Reich ===
Propaganda was also directed to Germans outside the Third Reich, to return as regions, or as individuals from other regions. Hitler hoped to make full use of the "German Diaspora".

Prior to Anschluss, a powerful transmitter in Munich bombarded Austria with propaganda of what Hitler had done for Germany, and what he could do for Austria. The annexation of Austria was presented as "enter[ing] German land as representatives of a general German will to unity, to establish brotherhood with the German people and soldiers there." Similarly, the last chapter of Eugen Hadamovsky's World History on the March glorifies Hitler's obtaining Memel from Lithuania as the latest stage in the progress of history.

In the Baltic States, after an agreement with Stalin, who suspected they would be loyal to Nazis, the Nazis set out to encourage the departure of "ethnic Germans" by the use of propaganda. This included using scare tactics about the Soviet Union, and led to tens of thousands leaving. Those who left were not referred to as "refugees", but were rather described as "answering the call of the Fuhrer".

As part of an effort to lure ethnic Germans back to Germany, folksy Heimatbriefe or "letters from the homeland" were sent to German immigrants to the United States. The reaction to these was on the whole negative, particularly as they picked up. Goebbels also hoped to use German-Americans to keep America neutral during the war, but the effect actually produced was great hostility to Nazi propagandists.

Radio propaganda to Russia included the threat that if the Volga Germans were persecuted, the Jews would have to pay for it, many times over.

Newspapers in the occupied Ukraine printed articles about antecedents of German rule over Ukraine, such as Catherine the Great and the Goths.

=== Anti-smoking ===
Nazi Germany conducted propaganda against smoking and had arguably the most powerful anti-tobacco movement in the world. Anti-tobacco research received a strong backing from the government, and German scientists proved that cigarette smoke could cause cancer. German pioneering research on experimental epidemiology led to the 1939 paper by Franz H. Müller, and the 1943 paper by Eberhard Schairer and Erich Schöniger which convincingly demonstrated that tobacco smoking was a main culprit in lung cancer. The government urged German doctors to counsel patients against tobacco use.

Tobacco and pollutants in the workplace were viewed as a threat to the German race, so for partly ideological reasons the Nazi government chose to conduct propaganda against them, as one of many preventative steps.

=== Eugenics ===
Although the child was "the most important treasure of the people", this did not apply to all children, even German ones, only those with no hereditary weaknesses.

Propaganda for the Nazi eugenics program began with propaganda for eugenic sterilization. Articles in Neues Volk described the pathetic appearance of the mentally ill and the importance of preventing such births. Photographs of mentally incapacitated children were juxtaposed with those of healthy children. The film Das Erbe showed conflict in nature in order to legitimate the Law for the Prevention of Hereditarily Diseased Offspring by sterilization.

Biology textbooks were among the most propagandistic in the Third Reich, owing to their content of eugenic principles and racial theories, including explanations of the Nuremberg Laws, which were claimed to allow the German and Jewish peoples to co-exist without the danger of mixing. Despite their many photographs glamorizing the "Nordic" type, the texts also claimed that visual inspection was insufficient, and genealogical analysis was required to determine their types, and report any hereditary problems; this resulted in children being used by racial agencies to obtain information about their families. Teachers' guidelines instructed teachers to ensure that the children thought sterilization "fulfills the command for loving one's neighbor, and is consistent with God-given natural laws." School poster depicted the costs of caring for the handicapped and what could have been bought for healthy families at the same price.

==== Pro-euthanasia ====
During the euthanasia program, the film Ich klage an was created to depict a woman being mercifully killed by her husband to escape her fatal illness, and his trial afterwards to stage pro-euthanasia arguments. It culminates in the husband's declaration that he is accusing them of cruelty for trying to prevent such deaths.

This situation presented the matter in the most favorable light, far from the solitary, involuntary deaths of those killed by the program under a very broad definition of "incurably ill".

== War ==
=== Stab-in-the-back legend ===
The Stab-in-the-back myth, asserting that Germany had not really been defeated in World War I but instead betrayed, was integral to affirming the excellence of Germany. The November Revolution and the "November Germany" resulting were objects of loathing; the hero of the movie Flüchtlinge turns his back on "November Germany", with its whining and sycophancy, to devote himself to true Germany. All movies depicting the era of defeat do so from the war veterans' point of view: in D III 38, a pilot refused to go on fighting on hearing of revolution, since they were "behaving like pigs" and would laugh at his sacrifice if he died; in Pour le Mérite, a war veteran scorns Weimar and declares he will disrupt it whenever he can; and in Leave on Parole, the people are portrayed as being corrupted by pacifist slogans while soldiers unflinching stood their ground.

The humiliation of Germany at Versailles was of good use to Hitler, both inside Germany and outside, where many onlookers were sympathetic.

=== Destruction of Germany ===
A common wartime motif was that the Allies intended to destroy this country for its excellence. Goebbels presented it as the stakes of the war. He had the Allied demand for unconditional surrender plastered on the walls of cities. The Parole der Woche's weekly wall newspaper repeatedly claimed quotations showed that the intent of the Allies was to destroy Germany as a strong, united, and armed country. The effect of this was to convince many soldiers that the demoralizing effect of atrocities had to be fought off, because they were fighting for their people's existence.

By the end of the war, total war propaganda argued that death would be better than the destruction the Allies intended to inflict, which would nevertheless end in death.

The propaganda claim was made from 1933 that Germany was under threat and attack and in need of defense.

=== In occupied countries ===
This line of propaganda presented obvious difficulties in occupied nations. Propaganda directed at these countries asserted, with blatant falsity, of wanting to protect European rather than German culture, particularly from the threat of Communism. At the same time that posters urged the French population to trust German soldiers, other posters urged German soldiers to show no friendship toward prisoners of war. Similarly, German soldiers in Ukraine were told to steel their hearts against starving women and children, because every bit of food given to them was stolen from the German people, endangering their nourishment.

When propaganda had to be visible to both native and foreign populations, a balance had to be struck. Pamphlets urging German women to protect the purity of their blood from foreign slave workers also asserted that this was not a manifestation of contempt for other nations.

German Institutes in occupied countries, particularly France, attempted to demonstrate Germanic cultural superiority through cultural programs, which also softened the effects of occupation, and distracted from Nazi plans. According to historian Allan Mitchell, Hitler could not come to a conclusion about where the French and their racial purity belonged in his race hierarchy as in Hitler's mind "the French were neither subhuman nor Aryan."

The Reich Ministry for the Occupied Eastern Territories contained a Main Department for Politics, which dealt with propaganda in the battle against the Soviet Union.

=== Total war ===
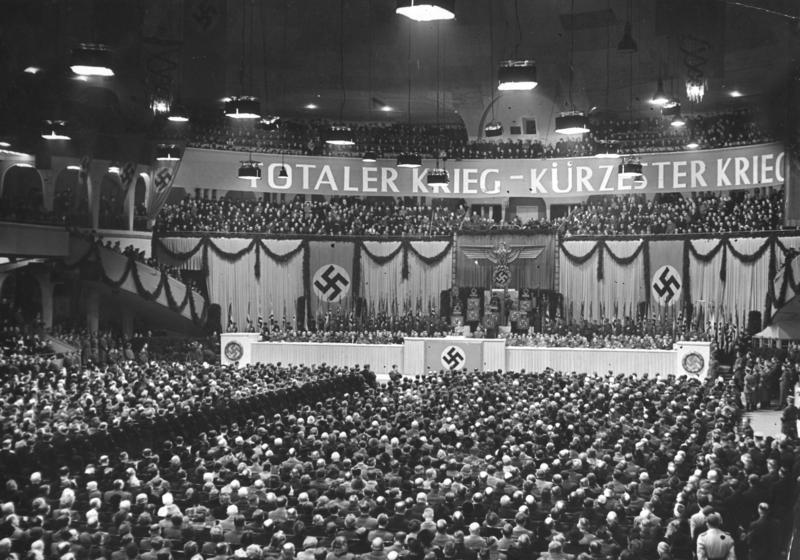
Nazi rally on 18 February 1943 at the Berlin Sportpalast. The sign says "Totaler Krieg – Kürzester Krieg" (Total War – Shortest War).

Early success led many in Germany to believe that the war could be won with ease. Setbacks caused Goebbels to call for propaganda to toughen up the German people and not make victory look easy. As early as the opening of the Battle of Britain, he urged caution in predicting victory. His Das Reich article called for people to fight rather than wonder how long the war would last. This process culminated in his Sportpalast speech, calling for total war. The audience was carefully selected for their reactions, to maximize impact of its radio broadcast. Attempts were also made to stir the civilian population into taking jobs in war production. An article appearing for Hitler's birthday urged women to greater efforts as birthday present. Goebbels used the assassination attempt on Hitler to urge utmost exertions.

The film Kolberg depicted title town in stubborn resistance to the French forces of the Napoleonic wars in order to stir resistance in the German people. Goebbels explicitly ordered the use of the historical events for a film, which he regarded as highly suitable for the circumstances Germany faced. The film itself can be taken as evidence that hope was lost for the German cause; It glorified resistance to the death, and only through an invented military miracle was the town saved in the film.

The fall of Italy was not well prepared for and had a deep impact; a leaflet even circulated drawing analogies between the German and Italian situations. A counter leaflet was spread to accentuate the difference.

By the end of the war, propaganda took the only possible tack: declaring death better than defeat. Theodore Kaufman's 1941 book Germany Must Perish was treated as significant depiction of American thought, and it was claimed that the Allies planned to dismember and fragment Germany, take away its industry, and turn 10 million Germans into slavery. Propagandists depicted the Volkssturm as an outburst of enthusiasm and will to resist. Das Reich depicted Berlin as fighting to the last, with no promises of miracle weapons that would save the day, as was done earlier.

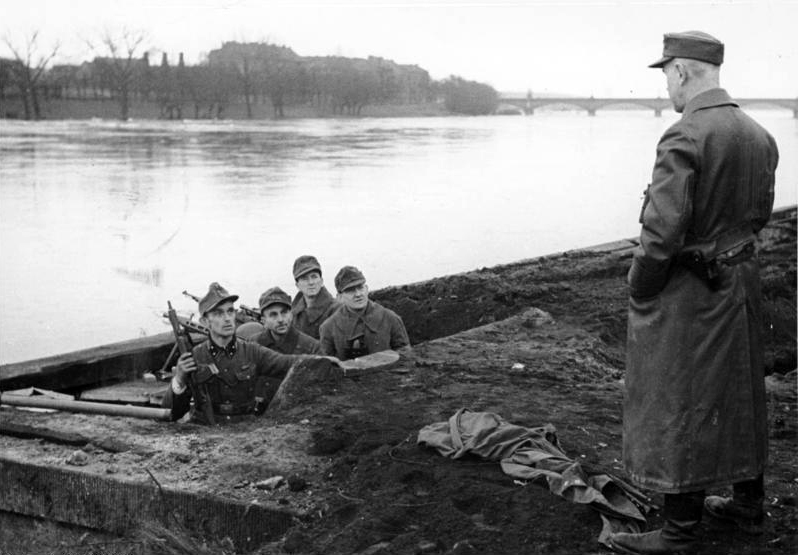
Volkssturm defending the Oder River February 1945

The demand for unconditional surrender was used by Goebbels to strengthen German resistance by pointing to the grim fate that awaited them.

The Morgenthau plan for the coming occupation of Germany, approved and signed in late 1944, concluded: "is looking forward to converting Germany into a country primarily agricultural and pastoral in its character." News of the plan were leaked to the press. Joseph Goebbels said that "The Jew Morgenthau" wanted to make Germany into a giant potato patch. Goebbels used the Morgenthau Plan for his propaganda machine extensively. The headline of the Völkischer Beobachter stated, "ROOSEVELT AND CHURCHILL AGREE TO JEWISH MURDER PLAN!"

Lt. Colonel John Boettiger said that the American troops that had had to fight for five weeks against fierce German resistance to capture the city of Aachen had complained to him that the Morgenthau Plan was "worth thirty divisions to the Germans."

On December 11, 1944 OSS operative William Donovan sent Roosevelt a telegraph message from Bern, warning him of the consequences that the knowledge of the Morgenthau plan had had on German resistance. The telegraph message from Donovan was a translation of a recent article in the Neue Zürcher Zeitung.

So far, the Allies have not offered the opposition any serious encouragement. On the contrary, they have again and again welded together the people and the Nazis by statements published, either out of indifference or with a purpose. To take a recent example, the Morgenthau plan gave Dr. Goebbels the best possible chance. He was able to prove to his countrymen, in black and white, that the enemy planned the enslavement of Germany. ...The conviction that Germany had nothing to expect from defeat but oppression and exploitation still prevails, and that accounts for the fact that the Germans continue to fight. It is not a question of a regime, but of the homeland itself, and to save that, every German is bound to obey the call, whether he be Nazi or member of the opposition.

=== Careless talk ===
The slogan Feind hört mit ("The Enemy is Listening") was deployed to discourage talk of sensitive information; a slogan saying "Talk is treachery" was not approved for fear that people would apply it to propaganda. The press had to be warned against creating the impression that spies were everywhere.

== Middle Ages ==
Another major theme within the context of Nazi propaganda was the coupling of mediaeval imagery with contemporary Nazi aesthetics. Many of the propaganda posters used at the time displayed a mediaeval knight, with a shield clad in Swastika.

That was not particular just to the Nazis, as many other European countries and even the Imperial German government used some forms of mediaeval imagery, but it was the Nazi regime that actually implemented mediaeval imagery in a fashion that equated themselves to their post-classical predecessors.

One of the most famous examples of this was Hubert Lanzinger's 1935 Hitler portrait entitled Der Bannertrager ("The Standard Bearer"). Hitler is clad in it in the armor of a knight, riding a war horse, and carrying with him the swastika flag. That is exactly the kind of synthesis between contemporary and mediaeval imagery that the Nazis used time and again. That way, the Nazis looked to paint themselves as the return of the heroes of German folklore.

The vast majority of the pieces did not involve any specific Nazi leaders, however, and simply placed the imagery of the current era with that of the mediaeval period. Another striking example is the 1936 celebration of the farmers, which shows a giant knight defending a small farm from a hammer and sickle. Images like that one were used during the prewar period typically to inspire the German people to believe in the regine's programs and policies of the Third Reich. In that period of turmoil, such images were designed to encourage support among average people by the association with popular and culturally-significant imagery.

Most such images reflected the more militant aspects of the Middle Ages. When the war itself was underway, the Nazis attempted to reach out to more than just the Germans by including feelings of cultural pride toward other Nordic peoples. The Nazis created images that pertained specifically to the Norse Viking heritage in the recruitment of soldiers from Scandinavians.

Just as they had in Germany made an appeal to people's heritage, they attempted to create the image that the Nazi's were the embodiment of the Germanic and Nordic past and that anyone who wanted to preserve their cultural heritage should join them.

As the war proceeded, propaganda became more pointedly directed at recruiting and used less and less mediaeval imagery, but it was used heavily in the lead-up and consolidation of power by the Nazis in the prewar period. It still being but slightly less often during the war itself. To an extent, as the war turned against Germany, the harsh realities of defeat meant that the average German citizen would be less inclined to support some fanciful depiction of a knight and more inclined to support a realistic depiction of a German soldier.

== See also ==
- Big lie
- Julius Streicher
- Rommel myth
- Wehrmachtbericht
