= Victims of the Past =

1937 Nazi propaganda film

- Opfer der Vergangenheit
- Directed by: Gernot Bock-Stieber, Kurt Botner
- Release date: 1937
- Running time: 25 minutes 5 seconds
- Country: Germany
- Language: German

Victims of the Past (original German title: Opfer der Vergangenheit: Die Sünde wider Blut und Rasse, English: Victims of the Past: The Sin against Blood and Race) is a Nazi propaganda film made in 1937, directed by Gernot Bock-Stieber and Kurt Botner.

This movie was a sequel to Erbkrank (Hereditary Illness), which showed images of inmates of German asylums in order to bolster public support for the planned T-4 Euthanasia Program for the mentally ill. The practices of providing institutions and care for the victims of hereditary diseases are described as transgressing the law of natural selection, and the expense of such care is depicted as a drain on healthy workers, and preventing the use of such money to help healthy Germans make better lives.

It was shown in every cinema in Germany. Adolf Hitler reportedly liked it.

Like the other five movies depicting the condition of the mentally ill in Germany, the movie was produced by the NS-Rasse und Politisches Amt (National Socialist Racial and Political Office). However, this film was the only one produced with sound.

== See also ==
- Aktion T4
- List of films made in the Third Reich
- Nazism and cinema
- Euthanasia
- Alles Leben ist Kampf
- Das Erbe
- Erbkrank
- Life unworthy of life
- List of German films 1933–1945
