= Alles Leben ist Kampf =

1937 Nazi propaganda film

- Directed by: Herbert Gerdes
- Release date: 1937
- Country: Germany

Alles Leben ist Kampf (English: All Life is Struggle) is a Nazi propaganda film produced in 1937, directed by Herbert Gerdes, and Werner Hüttig.

This film is about disabled people and the Law for the Prevention of Hereditarily Diseased Offspring, passed to stop disabilities affecting subsequent generations through forced sterilization. At the same time, it called for hereditarily healthy Germans to reproduce so as to prevent their people from becoming extinct. It was one of six propagandistic movies produced by the NSDAP, the Reichsleitung, Rassenpolitisches Amt or the Office of Racial Policy from 1935–1937 to demonize people in Germany diagnosed with mental illness and mental retardation.

This movie is along the same lines as Erbkrank (1936) which was similarly directed by Herbert Gerdes.

== See also ==
- Aktion T4
- Das Erbe
- Opfer der Vergangenheit
- Life unworthy of life
- Euthanasia
- List of German films 1933–1945
- Nazism and cinema
- Erbkrank
