= Erbkrank =

1936 Nazi propaganda film

- Title card
- Directed by: Herbert Gerdes
- Distributed by: NS-Rasse und Politisches Amt
- Release date: 1936
- Running time: 21 minutes, 19 seconds
- Country: Nazi Germany
- Language: German

Erbkrank (English: Congenitally Diseased) is a 1936 Nazi propaganda film directed by Herbert Gerdes.

Erbkrank was one of six propagandistic movies produced by the NS-Rasse und Politisches Amt (National Socialist Racial and Political Office), from 1935 to 1937 to demonize people in Germany diagnosed with mental illness and mental retardation. The goal was to gain public support for the T-4 Euthanasia Program then in preparation. This film, as the others, featured footage of patients in German psychiatric hospitals.

Adolf Hitler reportedly enjoyed the film so much that he encouraged the production of the full-length film Victims of the Past: The Sin against Blood and Race. In 1937, Erbkrank was reportedly showing in nearly all Berlin film theaters.

Prior to World War II, the film was distributed in America through the Pioneer Fund.

== See also ==
- Alles Leben ist Kampf
- Das Erbe
- Opfer der Vergangenheit
- Life unworthy of life
- Euthanasia
- List of German films 1933–1945
- Nazism and cinema
