= Das Erbe =

1935 Nazi propaganda film

- Directed by: Carl Hartmann
- Written by: Walter Lüddeke
- Produced by: Harold Mayer
- Release date: 1935
- Running time: 12 minutes
- Country: Nazi Germany
- Language: German

Das Erbe ("The Inheritance") was a Nazi propaganda movie released in 1935. Produced by Harold Mayer under the aegis of the Nazi party's Office of Racial Policy and directed by Carl C. Hartmann, it aimed at legitimizing the Law for the Prevention of Hereditarily Diseased Offspring ("Gesetz zur Verhütung erbkranken Nachwuchses"), which allowed for sterilization. The movie is 12 minutes long, and was shown as part of several trailers in contemporary German movie theaters.

== Plot and message ==
The plot was written by Walter Lüddeke. The basic message, that only the strong and healthy are victorious, is demonstrated by fighting stag beetles commented on by a "professor", These clips are watched by the character Fräulein Volkmann, a blonde young woman, who is therewith introduced to the "struggle for existence"(Daseinskampf). After watching the clips, Volkmann is astonished and says to the friendly, elderly professor: "So animals actually pursue a racial policy!" In the second part, the movie discusses the sorrow of the disabled and posits a relation between choice of the right partner and hereditary diseases of the offspring. The message is carried by shock clips of asylum patients and presentation of the high care cost.

Peter Zimmermann of the House of Documentary Film in Stuttgart evaluates the movie as follows:

The short movie Das Erbe (1935), which leads over from the animals' struggle for survival and natural selection to a plea for forced sterilization of the mentally ill, marks exactly the point where Social Darwinist biologism turns into Fascist racial policy providing the reasoning for the necessity of euthanasia. (Note: Zimmermann (2003), quote: "Der Kurzfilm Das Erbe (1935), der vom Existenzkampf in der Tierwelt und der Auslese der Arten zum Plädoyer für die Zwangssterilisierung Geisteskranker überleitet, bezeichnet genau den Punkt, an dem ein sozialdarwinistischer Biologismus in eine faschistische Rassenpolitik umschlägt, die die Notwendigkeit der Euthanasie argumentatorisch vorbereitet.")

In addition to Das Erbe, two silent movies were produced in 1935 to propagate euthanasia in the German population, Sünden der Väter and Abseits vom Wege ("Sins of the Fathers" and "Off track"). In the subsequent years, the media campaign was completed by another sound movie, "Opfer der Vergangenheit" ("Sacrifice of the Past", 1937) and three more silent movies, "Erbkrank" ("Inherited Malady", 1936), "Alles Leben ist Kampf" ("All Life is Struggle", 1937) and "Was du ererbst" ("What You Inherit", 1939). All these movies were produced by the Office of Racial Policy, shot in the Berlin area, and shown nationwide in movie theaters, factories and at Nazi party events, and together reached an audience of twenty million per year. Together with Erbkrank and Alles Leben ist Kampf, Das Erbe reflects the spirit of the Nuremberg Laws by subordinating the people to the authority of a superior "breeder's" cost-benefit analysis.

== See also ==
- List of German films 1933–1945
- Nazism and cinema
- Aktion T4
- Opfer der Vergangenheit
- Life unworthy of life
- Euthanasia
- Nazism and cinema
- Erbkrank

== Sources ==
=== Bibliography ===
- Barsam, Richard Meran (1992). Nonfiction film. A critical history. A Midland book. Vol. 706. Indiana University Press. ISBN 0-253-20706-1.
- Delage, Christian (1989). La vision nazie de l'histoire. Le cinéma documentaire du Troisième Reich. Histoire et théorie du cinéma (in French). L'AGE D'HOMME. ISBN 2-8251-3348-5.
- Matzek, Tom (2002). Das Mordschloss. Auf den Spuren von NS-Verbrechen in Schloss Hartheim (in German). Kremayr & Scheriau. ISBN 3-218-00710-0.
- Poore, Carol (2007). Disability in twentieth-century German culture Corporealities. Discourses of Disability. ISBN 978-0-472-11595-2.
- Reichert, Ramón (2006). Kulturfilm im "Dritten Reich" (in German). Synema. ISBN 3-901644-14-8.
- Zimmermann, Peter. "Zwischen Sachlichkeit, Idylle und Propaganda. Der Kulturfilm im Dritten Reich". In Zimmermann, Peter; Hoffmann, Kay (eds.). Triumph der Bilder. Kultur- und Dokumentarfilme vor 1945 im internationalen Vergleich. Close Up. Schriften aus dem Haus des Dokumentarfilms (in German). Vol. 16. Konstanz: UVK Medien 2003. pp. 59–73., **cited in https://web.archive.org/web/20100131063204/http://www.mediaculture-online.de/fileadmin/bibliothek/zimmermann_propaganda/zimmermann_propaganda.html, retrieved 2010-02-21
- Zimmermann, Peter (2005). Geschichte des dokumentarischen Films in Deutschland (in German). Vol. 3. P. Reclam jun. ISBN 3-15-010586-2.
  - hardback, Google books preview
  - pp. 505–529, 554–567 as cited by https://web.archive.org/web/20070927012529/http://www.mediaculture-online.de/fileadmin/bibliothek/zimmermann_propagandafilm/zimmermann_propagandafilm.html#sdfootnote22anc, retrieved: 2010-02-21
- "Das kalte Bild. Das Erbe (1935)". Augen-Blick (in German) (22). Philipps-Universität Marburg. Institut für Neuere Deutsche Literatur. 1995.
