= Unconditional surrender =

Type of surrender

An unconditional surrender is a surrender in which no guarantees, reassurances, or promises (i.e., conditions) are given to the surrendering party. It is often demanded with the threat of complete destruction, extermination or annihilation.

Announcing that only unconditional surrender is acceptable puts psychological pressure on a weaker adversary, but it may also prolong hostilities. A party typically only demands unconditional surrender when it has a significant advantage over their adversaries, when victory is thought to be inevitable.

In modern times, unconditional surrenders most often include guarantees provided by international law. In some cases, surrender is truly accepted unconditionally; while in other cases terms are offered and accepted, but forces are declared to be subject to "unconditional surrender" for symbolic purposes. This type of surrender may also be accepted by the surrendering party under the expectation of guarantees agreed to informally.

== Examples ==
=== Banu Qurayza during Muhammad's era ===
After the Battle of the Trench, in which the Muslims tactically overcame their opponents while suffering very few casualties, efforts to defeat the Muslims failed, and Islam became influential in the region. As a consequence, the Muslim army besieged the neighbourhood of the Jewish Banu Qurayza tribe, leading to their unconditional surrender. All the men, apart from a few who converted to Islam, were executed, while the women and children were enslaved. The historicity of the incident has been questioned.

=== Napoleon Bonaparte ===
When Napoleon Bonaparte escaped from his enforced exile on the island of Elba, one of the steps that the delegates of the European powers at the Congress of Vienna took was to issue a statement on 13 March 1815 declaring Napoleon Bonaparte to be an outlaw. The text includes the following paragraphs:

By thus breaking the convention which had established him in the island of Elba, Bonaparte destroys the only legal title on which his existence depended, and by appearing again in France, with projects of confusion and disorder, he has deprived himself of the protection of the law, and has manifested to the universe that there can be neither peace nor truce with him.

The powers consequently declare, that Napoleon Bonaparte has placed himself without the pale of civil and social relations; and that, as an enemy and disturber of the tranquillity of the world, he has rendered himself liable to public vengeance.

— Plenipotentiaries of the high powers who signed the Treaty of Paris (1814).

Consequently, as Napoleon was considered an outlaw when he surrendered to Captain Frederick Maitland of HMS Bellerophon at the end of the Hundred Days, he was not protected by military law or international law as a head of state and so the British were under no legal obligation to either accept his surrender or to spare his life. However, they did so to prevent him from being a martyr and exiled him to the remote South Atlantic island of Saint Helena.

=== American Civil War ===
The most famous early use of the phrase in the American Civil War occurred during the 1862 Battle of Fort Donelson. Brigadier General Ulysses S. Grant of the Union Army received a request for terms from Confederate Brigadier General Simon Bolivar Buckner Sr., the fort's commanding officer. Grant's reply was that "no terms except an unconditional and immediate surrender can be accepted. I propose to move immediately upon your works." When news of Grant's victory, one of the Union's first in the war, was received in Washington, DC, newspapers remarked (and President Abraham Lincoln endorsed) that Grant's first two initials, "U.S.," stood for "Unconditional Surrender," which would later become his nickname.

However, subsequent surrenders to Grant were not unconditional. When Robert E. Lee surrendered his Army of Northern Virginia at Appomattox Court House in 1865, Grant agreed to allow the men under Lee's command to go home under parole and to keep sidearms and private horses. Generous terms were also offered to John C. Pemberton at Vicksburg and, by Grant's subordinate, William Tecumseh Sherman, to Joseph E. Johnston in North Carolina.

Grant was not the only officer in the Civil War to use the phrase. The first instance came some days earlier, when Confederate Brigadier General Lloyd Tilghman asked for terms of surrender during the Battle of Fort Henry. Flag Officer Andrew H. Foote replied, "no sir, your surrender will be unconditional." Even at Fort Donelson, earlier in the day, a Confederate messenger approached Brigadier General Charles Ferguson Smith, Grant's subordinate, for terms of surrender, and Smith stated, "I'll have no terms with Rebels with guns in their hands, my terms are unconditional and immediate surrender." The messenger was passed along to Grant, but there is no evidence that either Foote or Smith influenced Grant's choice of words.

In 1863, Ambrose Burnside forced an unconditional surrender of the Cumberland Gap and 2,300 Confederate soldiers, and in 1864, Union General Gordon Granger forced an unconditional surrender of Fort Morgan.

=== World War II ===
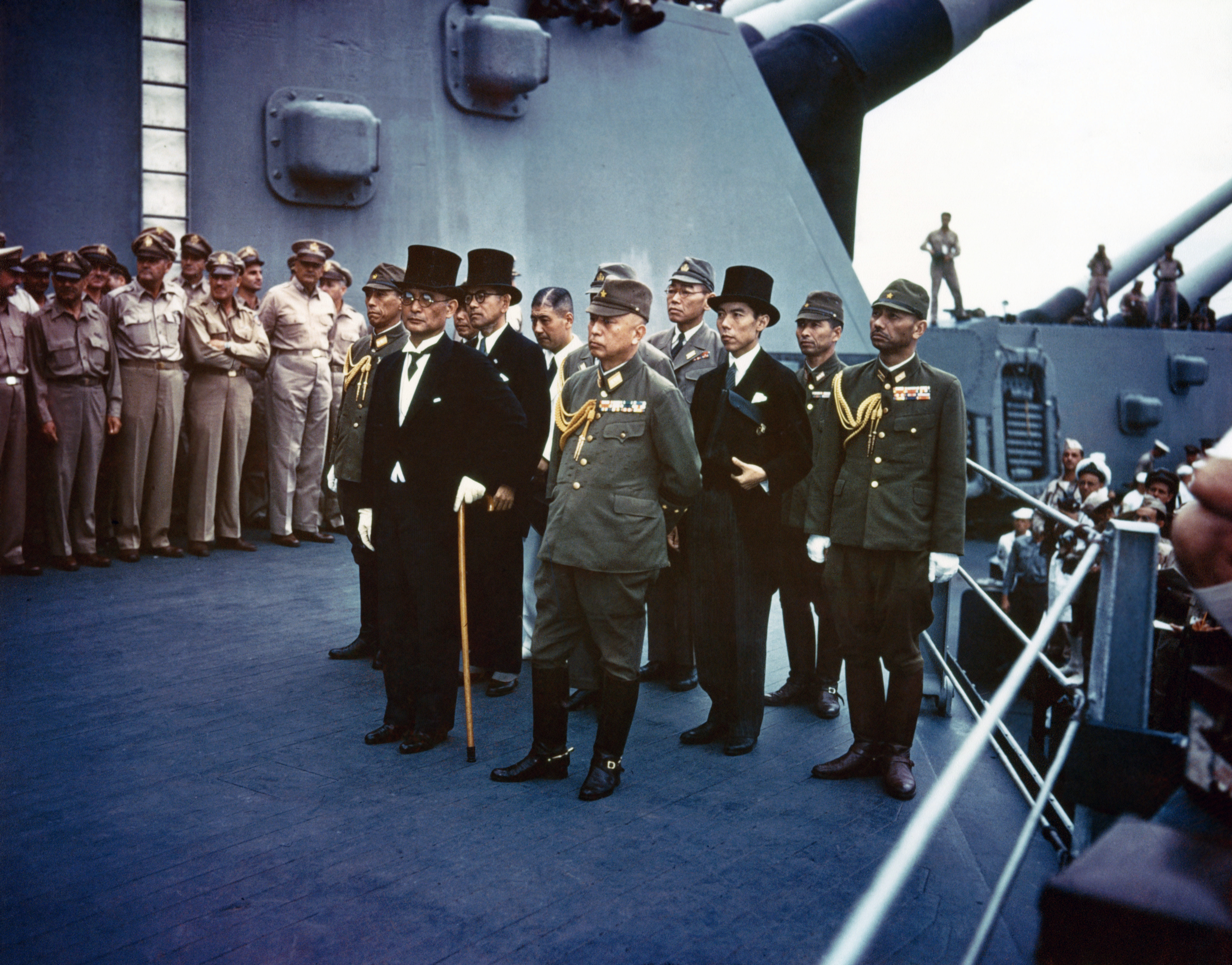
The Japanese delegation, headed by Mamoru Shigemitsu, prepares to sign the instrument of surrender aboard the USS Missouri in Tokyo Bay, 2 September 1945.

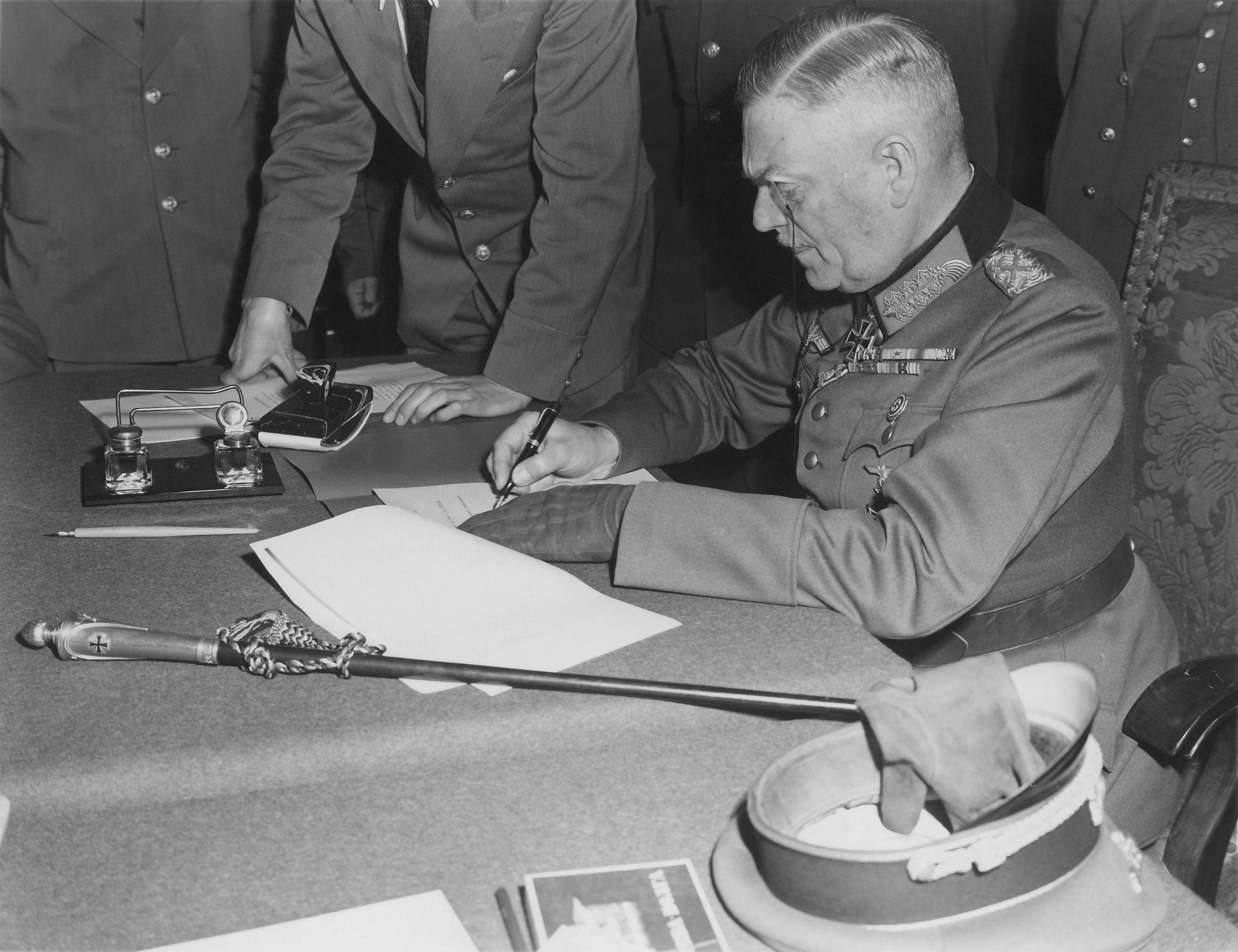
Field-Marshal Wilhelm Keitel signing the definitive act of unconditional surrender for the German military in Berlin, 8 May 1945

The use of the term was revived during World War II at the Casablanca Conference in January 1943 when American President Franklin D. Roosevelt stated it to the press as the objective of the war against the Axis Powers of Germany, Italy, and Japan. When Roosevelt made the announcement at Casablanca, he referred to General Grant's use of the term during the American Civil War.

The term was also used in the Potsdam Declaration issued to Japan on July 26, 1945. Near the end of the declaration, it said, "We call upon the government of Japan to proclaim now the unconditional surrender of all Japanese armed forces" and warned that the alternative was "prompt and utter destruction."

It has been claimed that it prolonged the war in Europe by its usefulness to German domestic propaganda, which used it to encourage further resistance against the Allied armies, and by its suppressive effect on the German resistance movement since even after a coup against Adolf Hitler:

"those Germans – and particularly those German generals – who might have been ready to throw Hitler over, and were able to do so, were discouraged from making the attempt by their inability to extract from the Allies any sort of assurance that such action would improve the treatment meted out to their country."

It has also been argued that without the demand for unconditional surrender, Central Europe might not have fallen behind the Iron Curtain. "It was a policy that the Soviet Union accepted with alacrity, probably because a completely destroyed Germany would facilitate Russia's postwar expansion program." It has also been claimed to have prolonged the war with Japan or to be a cause of the atomic bombings of Hiroshima and Nagasaki (see debate over the atomic bombings of Hiroshima and Nagasaki).

One reason for the policy was that the Allies wished to avoid a repetition of the stab-in-the-back myth, which had arisen in Germany after World War I and attributed Germany's loss to betrayal by Jews, Bolsheviks, and Socialists, as well as the fact that the war ended before the Allies had reached Germany. The myth was used by the Nazis in their propaganda. An unconditional surrender was felt to ensure that the Germans knew that they had lost the war themselves.

=== Bangladesh War of Independence ===
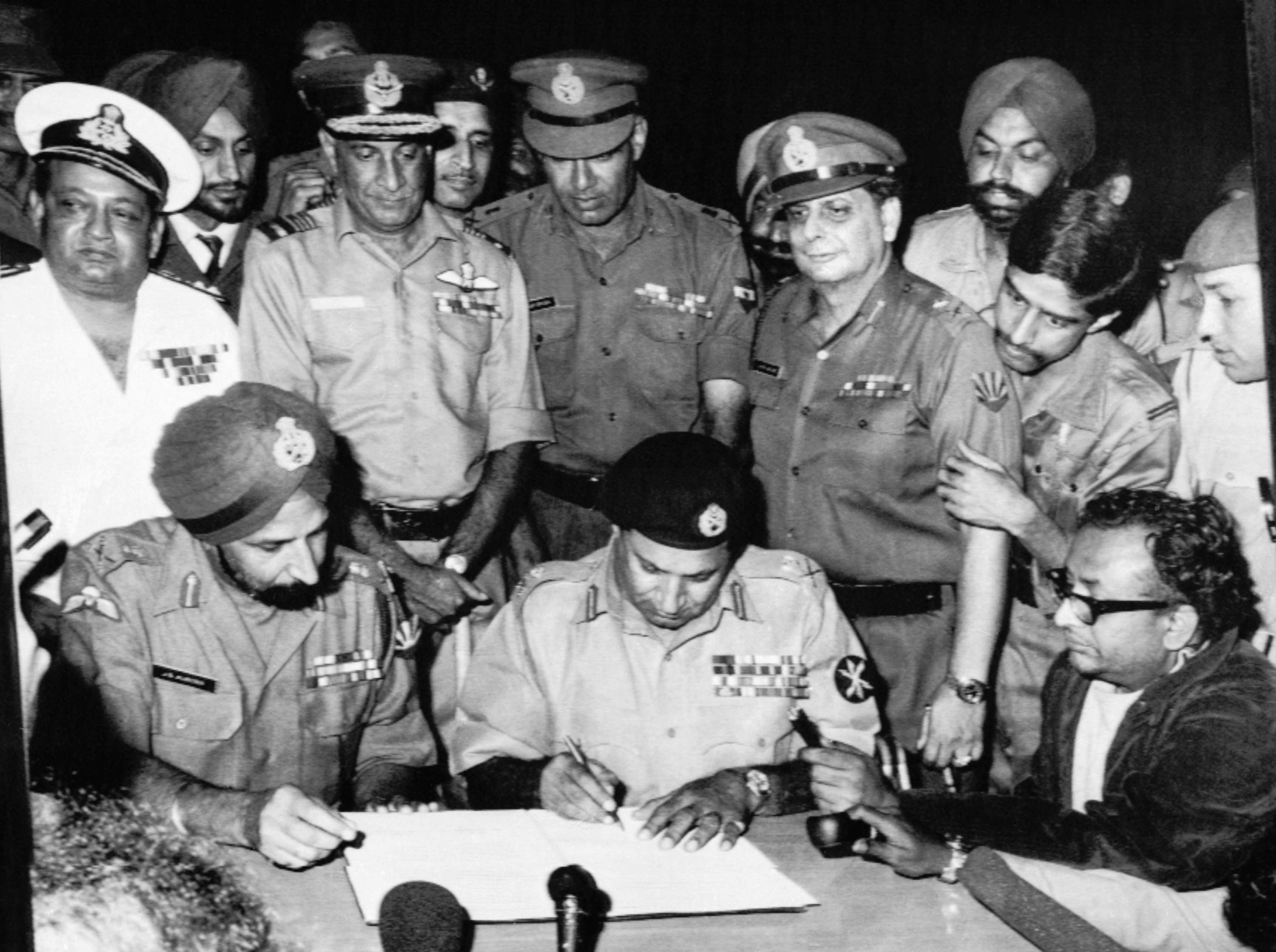
Signing of Pakistani Instrument of Surrender by Lt.Gen. A. A. K. Niazi in the presence of Indian military officers

On 16 December 1971, Lt. Gen A. A. K. Niazi, CO of Pakistan Armed Forces located in East Pakistan (now Bangladesh) signed the Instrument of Surrender handing over the command of his forces stationed in East Pakistan to the Indian Army under General Jagjit Singh Aurora. This led to the surrender of 93,000 personnel including families of the Pakistan's East Command and cessation of hostilities between the Pakistani Armed Forces and the Indian Armed Forces along with the guerrilla forces, the Mukti Bahini.

The signing of this unconditional surrender document gave Geneva Convention guarantees for the safety of the surrendered soldiers and completed the independence of Bangladesh.

=== Afghanistan War ===
On 15 August 2021, the government of the Islamic Republic of Afghanistan and the Afghan National Security Forces unconditionally surrendered to the Taliban. The unconditional surrender brought an end to the conflict and allowed the Taliban to take over Afghanistan and establish their government in the country.

== Surrender at discretion ==
In siege warfare, the demand for the garrison to surrender unconditionally to the besiegers is traditionally phrased as "surrender at discretion". If there are negotiations with mutually agreed conditions, the garrison is said to have "surrendered on terms". One example was at the Siege of Stirling, during the 1745 Jacobite Rebellion:

Charles, thereupon, sent a verbal message to the magistrates, requiring them instantly to surrender the town; but, at their solicitation, they obtained till ten o'clock next day to make up their minds. The message was taken into consideration at a public meeting of the inhabitants, and anxiously debated. The majority having come to the resolution that it was impossible to defend the town with the handful of men within, two deputies were sent to Bannockburn, the headquarters of the Highland army, who offered to surrender to terms; stating that, rather than surrender at discretion, as required, they would defend the town to the last extremity. After a negotiation, which occupied the greater part of Tuesday, the following terms of capitulation were agreed upon:...

Surrender at discretion was also used at the Battle of the Alamo, when Antonio López de Santa Anna asked Jim Bowie and William B. Travis for unconditional surrender. Even though Bowie wished to surrender unconditionally, Travis refused, fired a cannon at Santa Anna's army, and wrote in his final dispatches:

The enemy has demanded a surrender at discretion otherwise the garrison are to be put to the sword, if the fort is taken – I have answered their demand with a cannon shot, and our flag still waves proudly from the walls – I shall never surrender or retreat.

The phrase surrender at discretion is still used in treaties. For example, the Rome Statute, in force since July 1, 2002, specifies under "Article 8 war crimes, Paragraph 2.b:"

Other serious violations of the laws and customs applicable in international armed conflict, within the established framework of international law, namely, any of the following acts:

...

(vi) Killing or wounding a combatant who, having laid down his arms or having no longer means of defence, has surrendered at discretion;

The wording in the Rome Statute is taken almost word for word from Article 23 of the 1907 IV Hague Convention The Laws and Customs of War on Land: "...it is especially forbidden – ... To kill or wound an enemy who, having laid down his arms, or having no longer means of defence, has surrendered at discretion", and it is part of the customary laws of war.

== See also ==
- Surrender (military)
- Debellatio designates the end of a war caused by complete destruction of a hostile state.
- Military occupation
- Giving no quarter, refusal by the victor to spare the lives of surrendered foes
- Suing for peace
