= Neues Volk =

Nazi racial policy publication (1933–1945)

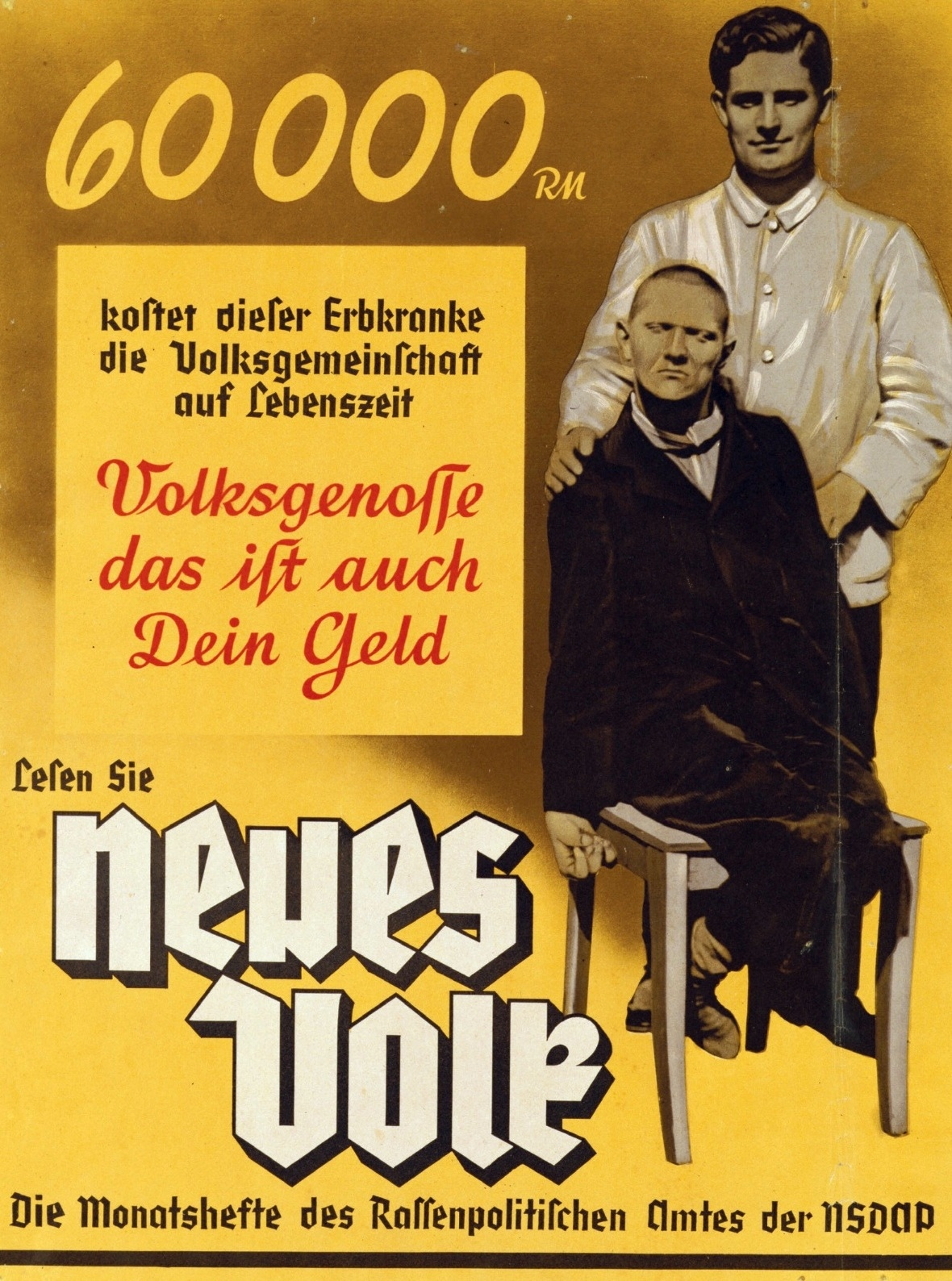
Infamous Neues Volk poster, c. 1937: "60,000 ℛℳ is what this person with a hereditary illness costs the folk-community in his lifetime. Folk-comrade, that is your money too. Read Neues Volk. The monthly magazine of the Office of Racial Policy of the NSDAP."

Neues Volk (German: [ˈnɔʏ.əs ˈfɔlk], "New People") was the monthly publication of the Office of Racial Policy in Nazi Germany. Founded by Walter Gross in 1933, it was a mass-market, illustrated magazine. It aimed at a wide audience, achieving a circulation of 300,000. It appeared in physicians' waiting rooms, libraries, and schools, as well as in private homes.

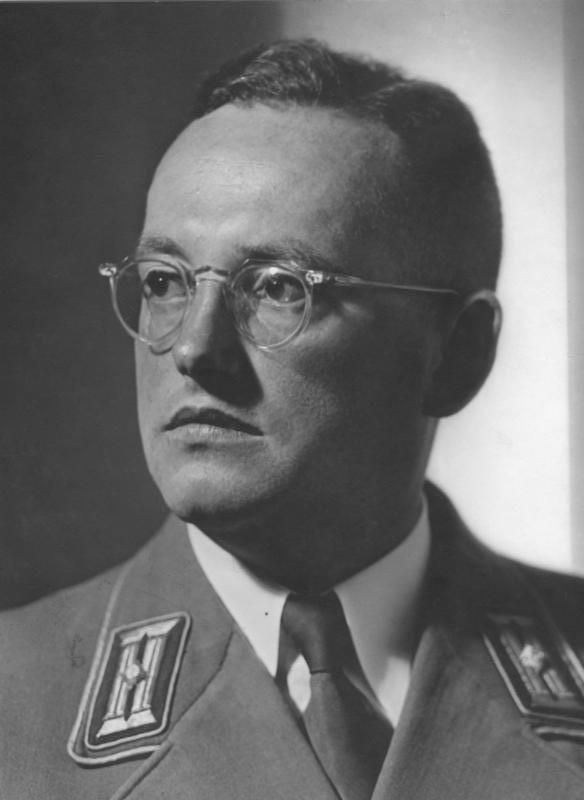
Dr. Walter Gross wearing a Nazi Party uniform of a Hauptstellenleiter in 1933

== Subject matter ==
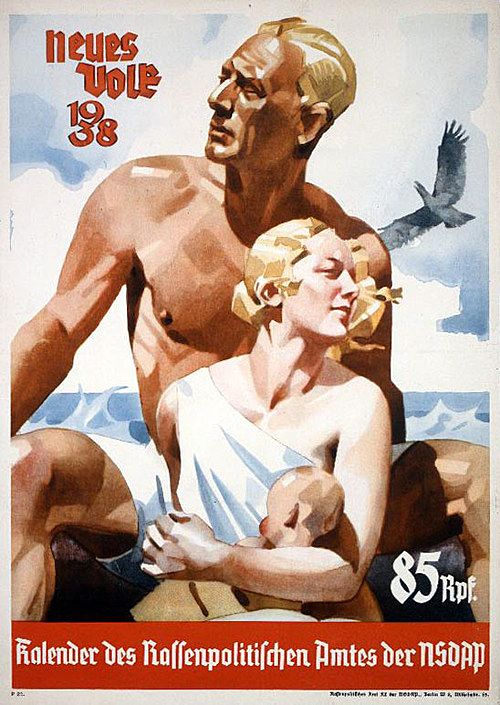
A calendar published in 1938 showing "pure Aryans"

The subject matter of the magazine was the "excellence" of the Aryan race and the "deficiencies" of Jews, Poles, and other groups. Articles ranged from profiles of Benito Mussolini, reports on Hitler Youth camps, and travel tips, but eugenic and racial propaganda continued throughout it. The first six issues presented solely ethnic pride, before bringing up any topic on "undesirables”. In the next issue, one article presented the types of the "Criminal Jew" surrounded by images of the ideal Aryan, which generally predominated. Such articles continued, displaying such things as demographic charts showing the decline of farmland (with generous Aryan families) and deploring that the Jews were eradicating traditional German peasantry.

Neues Volk included articles defending eugenic sterilization. Photographs of mentally incapacitated children were juxtaposed with those of healthy children. It also presented images of ideal Aryan families and ridiculed childless couples. After the inception of the Nuremberg Laws in 1935, it urged that Germans to show no sympathy for Jews and presented articles to show Jewish life still flourishing. By the mid-1930s, it had doubled its pages and greatly increased its discussion of Jews. Other articles described the conditions under which Hitler would be a child's godfather, discussed the importance of giving children Germanic names, answered racial questions from readers—marriage between a Chinese man and a German woman was impossible, despite the woman's pregnancy, and they had seen to it that the man's residence permit was revoked, and even an infertile German woman cannot marry a half-Jew, but a Dutch woman, if she had neither Jewish nor colored blood, was acceptable—praised German farming in contrast to French, declared art was determined by racial world-views, and many other topics. During the war, it published articles about how the foreign workers were welcome but sexual relations with Germans were prohibited.

== See also ==
- Nazi propaganda
