= Walter Gross (politician) =

German physician and Nazi politician (1904–1945)

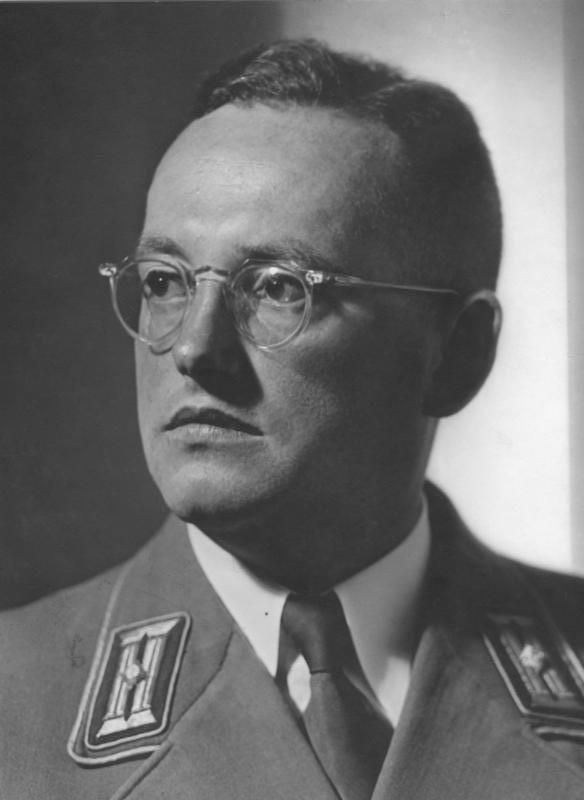
- Gross wearing a Nazi Party uniform of a Hauptstellenleiter in 1933

Personal details
- Born: October 21, 1904 Kassel
- Died: April 25, 1945 (aged 40)
- Party: Nazi Party

Walter Gross (written Groß in German) (21 October 1904 in Kassel – 25 April 1945 in Berlin) was a German physician appointed to create the Office for Enlightenment on Population Policy and Racial Welfare (Aufklärungsamt für Bevölkerungspolitik und Rassenpflege) for the Nazi Party. He headed this office, renamed the Office of Racial Policy (Rassenpolitisches Amt) in 1934, until his suicide at the close of World War II.

== Life and career ==
Walter Gross was born in Kassel on 21 October 1904. Mandated territorial losses consequent to the Treaty of Versailles forced the relocation of young Walter (then 15 years old) and his parents from eastern Germany in 1919. Gross studied medicine at the University of Göttingen, where he was attracted to and joined its reactionary antisemitic socio-political circles.

While training as a physician in 1925, he became a member of the Nazi Party (Nationalsozialistische Deutsche Arbeiterpartei or NSDAP). Gross obtained his doctorate from Göttingen in 1929 and worked as a physician in Braunschweig between 1929 and 1932. He was appointed leader of the National Socialist German Doctors' Alliance in 1932. Gross was an anti-Semite, committed believer of German racial purity, and called for the extermination of the Jews. He and Alfred Rosenberg held similar opinions on the alleged threats posed by racial contamination and the presence of Jews in Germany.

In 1933, Gross was appointed to create the National Socialist Office for Enlightenment on Population Policy and Racial Welfare, which was designed to educate the public and build support for the Nazi sterilization program and other "ethnic improvement" schemes through the 1930s. This was termed "enlightenment" rather than "propaganda" by Nazi authorities, because it was not a call for immediate action but for a long-term change in attitude, aiming at undermining the view where people thought of themselves as individuals rather than as single links in the great chain of life. In its first year, it published fourteen pamphlets for racial education. In 1933, Gross founded a mass-market glossy magazine, Neues Volk, which achieved wide popularity.

Historian Dan Stone explains that as a key leader on Nazi racial policies, the "task of making racial propaganda simple and consistent fell to Walter Gross". Echoing Stone's comments, historian Wolfgang Bialas likewise quipped that Gross was "entrusted with the racial education of Germans, who should from that point on be encouraged to develop biased biological sentiments". In this role, Gross promulgated the message of Aryan procreation to German women explicitly, evidenced by a speech he gave on 13 October 1934. (Note: The contents of the speech Gross delivered to a women’s meeting at the Gau party rally in Cologne can be viewed at the following webpage: "National Socialist Racial Policy: A Speech to German Women".) Also in 1934, Gross published his fanatically antisemitic book, Rasse und Politik (Race and Politics). Gross insisted that human inequality itself was a "fact of nature" and notions of "human equality stood in contrast" to it. (Note: These comments were shared by Gross in 1934. See: Walter Gross, ″Der Rassegedanke des Nationalsozialismus,″ Der Schulungsbrief, vol. 1 (1934) no. 2, pp. 6–20; p. 14 here.) Instead of focusing on the racial value of each individual, Gross made the Volkskörper or "racial body" the "measurement of social value and worth" and enthusiastically contended it was the "voice of the blood streaming through history" that would be a counterweight to Jewish ideals of effete democracy.

Unlike some Nazi racial ideologues who idealized Germany's distant Nordic relatives, Gross recommended caution with this theory, so as not to alienate or cause feelings of inferiority with the German population in any way. Over time, he signaled for the racial anthropological theories associated with Nordicism to "adopt a lower public profile", while hereditary psychology gained comparative favor regarding inherited characteristics along with evolutionary biology and human genetics.

Gross participated in a meeting at the NSDAP Supreme Party Court in Munich during December 1934 along with other Nazi authorities on genealogical and racial matters. This late 1934 meeting included: Rudolf Kummer from the Bavarian State Ministry for Instruction and Education, the leader and founder of the Reich Association of Kinship Researchers and Heraldists, Achim Gercke, the leader of the National Socialist German Doctors' League, Gerhard Wagner, and the General Commissioner for Medical and Health Service, Karl Brandt, who was ultimately responsible for overseeing the T4 extermination program (Note: Brandt worked with Philipp Bouhler on this Nazi endeavor.); this assemblage of "experts" was called together to establish the Nazis' fundamental position on "racial policy". To this end, Gross played an important role "in the formulation of both the eugenic legislation and the Nuremberg racial laws" enacted by the Nazi regime.

After a committee meeting of "racial experts" brought together in March 1935 to deliberate the fate of Germany's Rhineland bastards, Gross recommended—following an anthropological investigation—that they all be compulsorily sterilized; a task carried out by 1937. Another problematic area that came to the attention of Gross and demanded a solution—beyond sterilizing certain groups—was the alleged impact to the German people brought on by caring for the weak and crippled. Such thinking eventually contributed to the formation of the Nazi euthanasia program, where a vast array of factors (including many highly subjective illnesses) were cited as justification for murdering persons under the auspices of racial cleansing.

At the 1936 parliamentary election, Gross was elected as a deputy to the Reichstag from electoral constituency 9, Oppeln. Reelected in April 1938, he retained this seat until his death. Sometime in 1938, Gross was made an honorary professor and taught racial anthropology at the University of Berlin. That same year, Gross, then head of the Reich Bureau for Enlightenment on Population Policy and Racial Welfare, contributed a chapter entitled "National Socialist Racial Thought" to an English language book, Germany Speaks, wherein he elaborates with religious fervor the usual pseudo-scientific Nazi rhetoric about Aryan racial purity, the dangers of foreign blood, the need for additional arable soil, as well as the menace caused by Jews and other identified Nazi enemies. According to the Nazi worldview and Gross in particular, the world was not a single humanity but consisted only of varied groups of peoples "with certain racial characteristics and hybridizations". (Note: Gross expressed these observations in the following: Walter Gross, ″Rasse und Weltanschauung,″ Weltkampf, March 1938, no. 171, pp. 97–108; specifically p. 105.) Messaging from Gross remained consistently focused on race, indicated by his pamphlet You and Your Volk—disseminated at the beginning of the war—which urged German soldiers to think racially at all times. Even asocial people within the German population were not safe from Nazi categorization by Gross, who in a 1940 speech, avowed their problems were not derived via environmental determinism but were inescapably and immutably a part of their familial heritage. (Note: He castigated Germany's asocial population groups as "useless" and "harmful" by their very existence.)

Along with Peter Heinz Seraphim, Gross was one of the only academics to speak publicly in support of the Final Solution of the Jewish Question as early as March 1941.

In a 1943 brochure designed for the Hitler Youth, Gross railed against the dangers of foreign blood threatening German purity and stated therein that racial policy would be ineffective "without a clear awareness of our own blood, self-respect, and racial pride". One of his later pseudo-scientific works—written in 1943 as the Final Solution was being carried out—evoked "zoological anti-semitism" and contained verbiage portending the horrors of Nazi carnage; its title for posterity, Die rassenpolitischen Voraussetzungen zur Lösung der Judenfrage (The Racial Political Prerequisites for Solving the Jewish Question). Between 1942 and 1945, Gross acted as one of the heads with the Rosenberg Bureau. (Note: Within Amt Rosenberg, Gross was in charge of the Science Division.)

Throughout his career, Gross advocated for sterner measures against the Jews to Nazi policymakers, and while he never attained the levels of power and influence achieved by Adolf Eichmann or Reinhard Heydrich, his "blend of scientific vocabulary" appealed to and impressed the highest levels of Nazi leadership since it accorded with their views on race and justified aggression.

=== Final days and death ===
As late as March 1945, Gross was still sending reports from his Racial Policy Office to the Party Chancellery concerning ethnic matters. Covering some of his own tracks, Gross burned his files in Berlin at the closing of World War II, thereby, in the opinion of Claudia Koonz, erasing significant evidence "that would have incriminated the more than 3,000 members of his national network of racial educators."

Gross committed suicide on 25 April 1945, shortly before the German surrender.

== Bibliography ==
- Bialas, Wolfgang (2013). "The Eternal Voice of the Blood: Racial Science and Nazi Ethics". In Anton Weiss-Wendt; Rory Yeomans (eds.). Racial Science in Hitler's New Europe, 1938–1945. Lincoln, NE: University of Nebraska Press. ISBN 978-0-80324-605-8.
- Bialas, Wolfgang (2014). "Nazi Ethics and Morality: Ideas, Problems and Unanswered Questions". In Wolfgang Bialas; Lothar Fritze (eds.). Nazi Ideology and Ethics. Newcastle upon Tyne: Cambridge Scholars. ISBN 978-1-44385-422-1.
- Burleigh, Michael; Wippermann, Wolfgang (1991). The Racial State: Germany 1933–1945. Cambridge and New York: Cambridge University Press. ISBN 978-0-52139-802-2.
- Cecil, Robert (1972). The Myth of the Master Race: Alfred Rosenberg and Nazi Ideology. New York: Dodd, Mead & Co. ISBN 978-0-674-01172-4.
- Chapoutot, Johann (2018). The Law of Blood: Thinking and Acting as a Nazi. Cambridge and London: The Belknap Press of Harvard University Press. ISBN 978-0-67466-043-4.
- Ehrenreich, Eric (2007). The Nazi Ancestral Proof: Genealogy, Racial Science, and the Final Solution. Bloomington: Indiana University Press. ISBN 978-0-25334-945-3.
- Friedlander, Henry (1995). The Origins of Nazi Genocide: From Euthanasia to the Final Solution. Chapel Hill: University of North Carolina Press. ISBN 978-0-80782-208-1.
- Haar, Ingo (2005). "German Ostforschung and Anti-Semitism". In Haar, Ingo; Fahlbusch, Michael (eds.). German Scholars and Ethnic Cleansing. New York and Oxford: Berghahn Books. pp. 1–27. ISBN 1-57181-435-3.
- Hutton, Christopher (2005). Race and the Third Reich: Linguistics, Racial Anthropology and Genetics in the Dialectic of Volk. Cambridge and New York: Cambridge University Press. ISBN 978-0-74563-177-6.
- Klee, Ernst (2016). Personenlexikon zum Dritten Reich: Wer war was vor und nach 1945 (in German). Hamburg: Nikol Verlag. ISBN 978-3-86820-311-0.
- Koonz, Claudia (2003). The Nazi Conscience. Cambridge, MA: Belknap Press of Harvard University Press. ISBN 978-0-674-01172-4.
- Proctor, Robert (1988). Racial Hygiene: Medicine under the Nazis. Cambridge, MA: Harvard UP. ISBN 978-0674745780.
- Stackelberg, Roderick (2007). The Routledge Companion to Nazi Germany. New York: Routledge. ISBN 978-0-41530-861-8.
- Stone, Dan (2023). The Holocaust: An Unfinished History. New York and Boston: Mariner Books. ISBN 978-0-06334-903-2.
- Wistrich, Robert (1995). Who's Who in Nazi Germany. New York: Routledge. ISBN 978-0-41511-888-0.
- Zentner, Christian; Bedürftig, Friedemann (1991). The Encyclopedia of the Third Reich. (2 vols.) New York: MacMillan Publishing. ISBN 0-02-897500-6.
