= Nazi Party Office of Racial Policy =

Racial policy agency of Nazi Germany

Coordinates: 52°30′26″N 13°22′57″E

NSDAP Office of Racial Policy
- Rassenpolitisches Amt der NSDAP (German)
- Parteiadler

Office overview
- Formed: 17 November 1933 (as Nazi Party Office for Enlightenment on Population Policy and Racial Welfare)
- Dissolved: 8 May 1945
- Office executive: Walter Gross (1933–1945)
- Parent Office: Nazi party

The Office of Racial Policy was a department of the Nazi Party (NSDAP) that was founded for "unifying and supervising all indoctrination and propaganda work in the field of population and racial politics". It began in 1933 as the Nazi Party Office for Enlightenment on Population Policy and Racial Welfare (German: Aufklärungsamt für Bevölkerungspolitik und Rassenpflege der NSDAP). By 1935, it had been renamed to the Nazi Party Office of Racial Policy (German: Rassenpolitisches Amt der NSDAP or RPA).

Walter Gross was tasked with creating the office, and remained its leader until his suicide at the end of the Second World War in April 1945.

== Purpose ==
The main role of the RPA was to oversee the production and maintenance of propaganda regarding the ethnic consciousness of the Nordic Aryan master race. This was termed "enlightenment" rather than "propaganda" by the Nazi authorities, because it was "not a call for immediate action but a long-term change in attitude". Gross did not want people thinking of themselves as individuals but rather as "single links in the great chain of life".

== Methods ==
All Nazi Party racial information required the approval of Gross' office before publication. The department dealt with all measures concerning the field of population and racial policies in cooperation with other Nazi and SS agencies, such as the RKFDV. The RPA checked and passed all Nazi Party press releases on issues of race. It also provided input for drafting Nazi legislation regarding racial issue.

The RPA produced Neues Volk, a monthly magazine aimed at a general readership rather than towards a specialist audience. But while containing articles on topics such as travel tips, its central theme was the promotion of eugenics and ethnic consciousness. Other publications created by the office included a ten-point plan to marriage. The guidelines, rather than focusing on love, stressed the ideal criteria for marriage in the Nazi state was the consideration of race and health. The pamphlet urged investigation of the ancestry of potential mates, and that the hereditarily fit should not remain single, concluding with the injunction to hope for many children. Other works included "Can You Think Racially?" and "Peasantry between Yesterday and Today".

The RPA also created traveling exhibitions that presented the ideal Aryan type as unchanging in contrast to subhuman types. In its first year, the office had published 14 pamphlets for racial education. This led to the establishment of intensive training courses to create ethnic educators. More than a thousand Sturmabteilung personnel and recent medical school graduates were indoctrinated each year on Nazi racial topics until 1945.

== See also ==
- Hauptamt Volksdeutsche Mittelstelle
- Racial policy of Nazi Germany
- SS Race and Settlement Main Office
