= Wolfgang Abel =

Austrian anthropologist (1905–1997)

- Born: 13 May 1905; Vienna, Austria-Hungary
- Died: 1 November 1997 (aged 92); Mondsee, Austria
- Occupation: Anthropologist
- Parent: Othenio Abel

Wolfgang Abel (13 May 1905 – 1 November 1997) was an Austrian anthropologist and one of Nazi Germany's top racial biologists. He was the son of the Austrian paleontologist Othenio Abel.

== Early life and career ==
From April 1931 Wolfgang Abel worked as an assistant at the Kaiser Wilhelm Institute of Anthropology, Human Heredity, and Eugenics. In 1933 he became a member of the NSDAP. He was involved in compulsory sterilization of children, who resulted from relationships between German women and dark-skinned French soldiers. In 1934 he wrote an article, which was published in the German newspaper "Neues Volk", with the title "Bastarde am Rhein" (Rhineland Bastards). In 1935 he joined the SS and became part of the SS Race and Settlement Main Office (RuSHA) as well as the Reich Genealogical Office. In 1942 Abel was successor to Eugen Fischer for the professorship of racial biology at the University of Berlin.

Wolfgang Abel delivered a speech in 1938 at the "Congres International des Sciences Anthropologiques et Ethnologiques, Deuxieme Session, Copenhague 1938". The topic was: Die Rasse der rumänischen Zigeuner. Meaning, On the Race of the Romanian Gypsies.

In the same year, Abel was, in addition to his work at the KWI, lecturer in anthropology, as well as Deputy Head of the Department of racial hygiene of the German High School for Politics. After joining the SS in 1935, he also worked as Chief Appraiser for the Imperial Family Office. At the Kaiser Wilhelm Institute, Wolfgang Abel rose in 1940 to the head of the Department of Ethnography. In July 1941, he was appointed an extraordinary Professor. Previously, already Assistant of Eugenics to Eugen Fischer, he was from 1943 to 1945 his successor to the Chair of professorship in the University of Berlin. At the same time, he worked at this time for the high command of the German Army (OKH).

In addition to his teachings, Wolfgang Abel assumed the management of the Institute Awards of the German High School for Politics in 1943. In 1945, Abel was dismissed from the University of Berlin. From 1945 to 1947, he was interned by the Americans. He then lived as a portrait painter in Austria.

Abel was involved in German racial investigations. For instance, from 1941 to 1942, he studied Soviet prisoners of war. His "racial surveys" proposed "either the extermination of the Russian people or the Germanization of the Nordic elements of the Russian people" based on his analysis of the racial component of his Soviet research subjects. In the framework of the General Plan East, Abel worked out a plan for a "progressive elimination" of the "Russian race' with which he wanted all "Russian Nordic types "Germanized" and the rest deported to Siberia, in May 1942. Abel was also tasked to investigate Black children of the Rhineland to determine the effects of racial mixture on their physical and intellectual constitution. He concluded that his subjects demonstrated various degrees of deficiency in intellectual ability and behavior.

Abel was in charge of several sterilization campaign against the Gypsies, Afro-Germans, and Africans under German colonial rule.

== Later life and death ==
After World War II, he lived in Austria until he died in 1997.

== Literature ==
- Ernst Klee ("Das Personenlexikon zum Dritten Reich") describes Wolfgang Abel as an anthropologist who joined the NSDAP in 1933 and in 1935 joined the SS, was attached to SS-RuSHA and was Leiter des Institutes für Rassenbiologie der Deutschen Hochschule für Politik. Klee gives him a birthdate of 13.05.1905.
- Lusane, Clarence (2002). Hitler's Black Victims: The Historical Experience of Afro-Germans, European Blacks, Africans and African Americans in the Nazi Era (Cross Currents in African American History) Routledge. ISBN 978-0-415-93295-0
- Proctor, Robert (2006). Racial Hygiene: Medicine Under the Nazis Harvard University Press. ISBN 978-0-674-74578-0
