= Racial policy of Nazi Germany =

Set of laws implemented in Nazi Germany

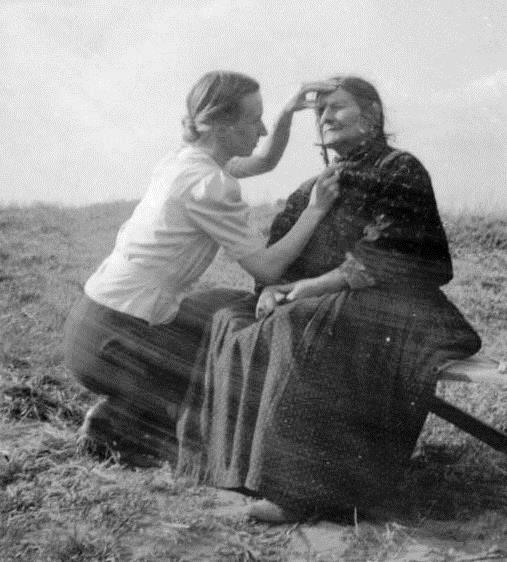
Eva Justin of the Racial Hygiene and Demographic Biology Research Unit measuring the skull of a Romani woman.

The racial policy of Nazi Germany was a set of orders and laws implemented in Nazi Germany under the dictatorship of Adolf Hitler, based on pseudoscientific and racist doctrines asserting the superiority of the putative "Aryan race". Nazi eugenics aimed for "racial hygiene" through compulsory sterilization of people they viewed as subhuman (Untermenschen). This policy culminated in the Holocaust.

Under the Nazi appropriation of the term "Aryan", a racial hierarchy was erected with an Aryan "master race" (Herrenvolk) at the top. Centuries-long residents of German territories were marked as inferior, including Jews, Romani people, and the vast majority of Slavs.

The Nazi Party's Office of Racial Policy organized the program and extensively published circulars and directives to relevant administrative organs, newspapers, and educational institutes. The major legislation that enacted Nazi racial policy was known as the Nuremberg Laws.

== Aryan Master Race ==
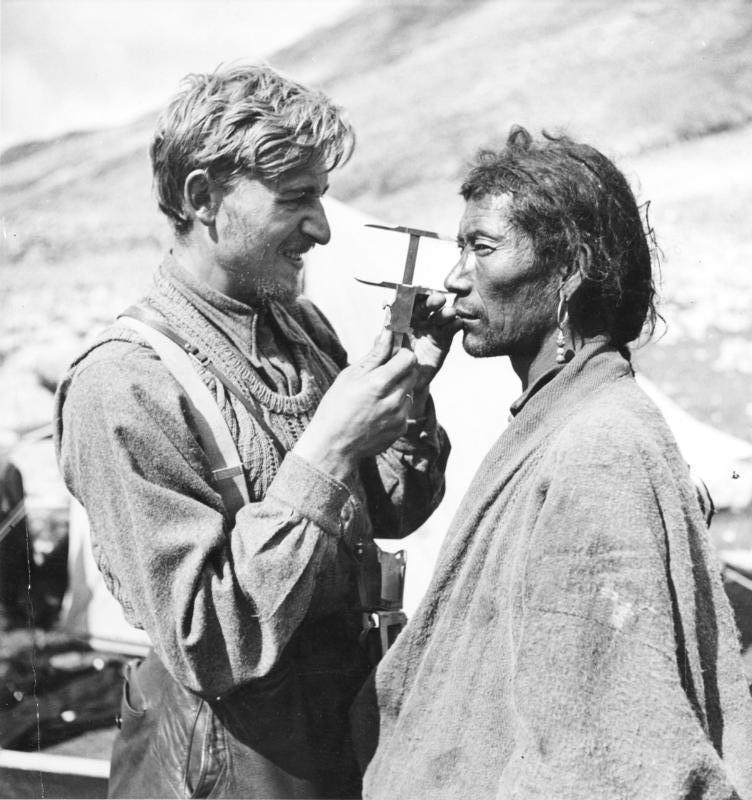
Bruno Beger conducting anthropometric studies in Sikkim.

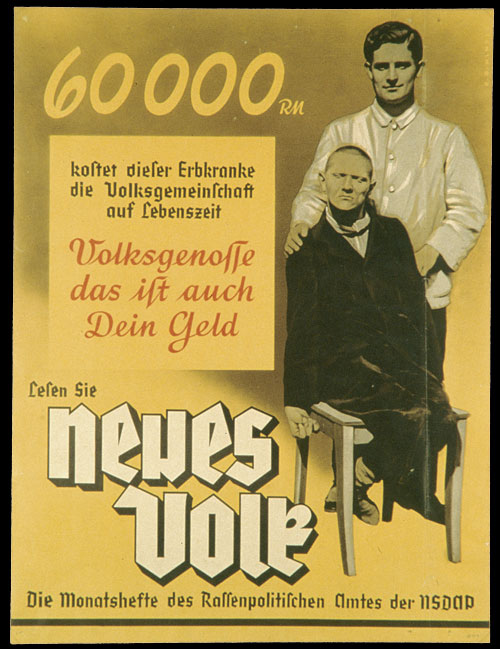
Propaganda for Nazi Germany's T4 Euthanasia Program: "This person suffering from hereditary defects costs the community 60,000 ℛ︁ℳ︁ during his lifetime. Fellow German, that is your money, too." from the Office of Racial Policy's Neues Volk.

Theorists in the Völkisch movement believed that Germany's Teutonic ancestors spread throughout Europe. Germanic tribes like the Burgundians, Franks, and Western Goths joined with the Gauls to make France. The Lombards moved south and joined with Italians; the Jutes made Denmark; the Angles and Saxons made England; the Flemings made Belgium; and other tribes made the Netherlands. Precursors to Nazi racial beliefs can be found in works of writers like Arthur de Gobineau, Houston Stewart Chamberlain, and Hans F. K. Günther.

Nazi racial theory placed human beings on a scale from pure Aryan to non-Aryan Untermensch (subhuman). Their idea of an Aryan master race included Germanic peoples and other Northern Europeans like Scandinavians, Dutch, and English people. Italic peoples were tolerated, and French people were considered suitably Germanic.

At the bottom of the racial scale were Jews, Polish people, Serbs and other Slavs, Romani people, and black people. The Nazis originally sought to rid the German state of Jews and Romani by means of deportation, while black people were to be segregated and eliminated through compulsory sterilization.

The Nazis considered Slavs Non-Aryans who were to be expelled, enslaved, or exterminated through the secret Generalplan Ost ("Master Plan East"). Their propaganda suggested any Asiatic Slavs were the results of intermingling with Mongolians and that they were dominated by Jews and Bolsheviks.

When the Nazi Party gained power in 1933, they passed the Law for the Encouragement of Marriage which offered a government loan to all newly married Aryan couples. After the birth of each child, a portion of the loan would be forgiven. The goal was to increase birthrates for the racially elite.

The Nazis also quickly established a eugenics mechanism by passing the Law for the Prevention of Hereditarily Diseased Offspring in July 1933. Compulsory sterilization could be forced by the Hereditary Health Court for anyone suffering from an intellectual disability, schizophrenia, manic depression, epilepsy, Huntington's disease, blindness, deafness, "any severe hereditary deformity", and even alcoholism. The law also enforced sterilization of the "Rhineland bastards", children of German and African parentage. Between 1933 and 1945, 3–400,000 people were sterilized under the law. The policy soon accelerated from sterilization into euthanasia in programs like Aktion T4, which targeted people with disabilities and the mentally ill.

=== American influence ===
In a 1928 speech about the goals of the Nazi Party, Adolf Hitler admired the way white men in North America decimated indigenous people through violence and subterfuge. Once in power, the Nazis looked to America as a classic example of a country with racist laws. Historians sometimes dismissed the idea that racist policies like American Jim Crow laws provided a template for Nazi legislation, but the influence was always evident.

A Nazi memo from 1933 authored by a team led by Roland Freisler working under Hanns Kerrl pointed to North American race laws as emblematic of Nazi goals. The memo summarized the Völkisch thesis, "The fundamental principle of the egoistic age of the past, that everyone who bears a human countenance is equal, destroys the race and therewith the life force of the Volk. It is therefore the task of the National Socialist state to check the race-mixing that has been underway in Germany over the course of the centuries". As models for this racist program, the memo pointed to medieval expulsions of Jews from European countries as well as Jim Crow laws in the American south. The Nazis adapted the mechanisms of Jim Crow laws into the Nuremberg Laws and the Reich Citizenship Law, which stripped Jews of German citizenship.

== Jewish racial policies ==
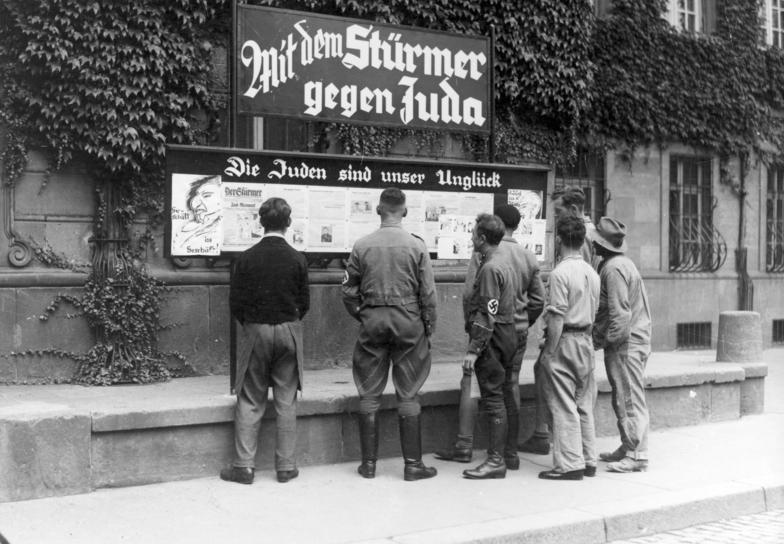
Public reading of Julius Streicher's antisemitic newspaper Der Stürmer, Worms, Germany, 1935.

In 1933, approximately 525,000 Jews were living in Germany, 0.75% of the population. Discrimination against Jews began immediately after the national seizure of power in 1933. The first stumbling block towards making persecution of the Jews an active Nazi policy was defining them. Lawyer Bernhard Lösener described the debate as total chaos. Germans of mixed descent (Mischling) were especially problematic for the party. Various percentages of Jewish heritage were argued as definitive. Politician Achim Gercke felt 1/16 Jewish ancestry should be the legal threshold. There was no clear definition when the first antisemitic law was promulgated. The Nazis finally defined a Jew as a person with three or four Jewish grandparents. One or two Jewish grandparents was considered mixed.

On April 1, 1933, a Nazi boycott of Jewish businesses was observed throughout Germany. Only six days later, the Law for the Restoration of the Professional Civil Service banned Jews from serving in the public sector. Such laws were defended as necessary to prevent the infiltration of damaging, "alien-type" (Artfremd) hereditary traits into the German national or racial community (Volksgemeinschaft). The legislation was aimed at reserving privileged positions for Aryan Germans. The exclusion of Jews continued apace, with each new law cementing their status as second-class citizens.

On August 25, 1933, the Nazis signed the Haavara Agreement with Zionists to allow German Jews to emigrate to Palestine in exchange for a portion of their economic assets. The agreement offered a way to leave an increasingly hostile environment in Nazi Germany. Most Jews fled to Western Europe. By 1939, 60,000 German Jews had emigrated to Palestine.

=== Nuremberg Laws ===
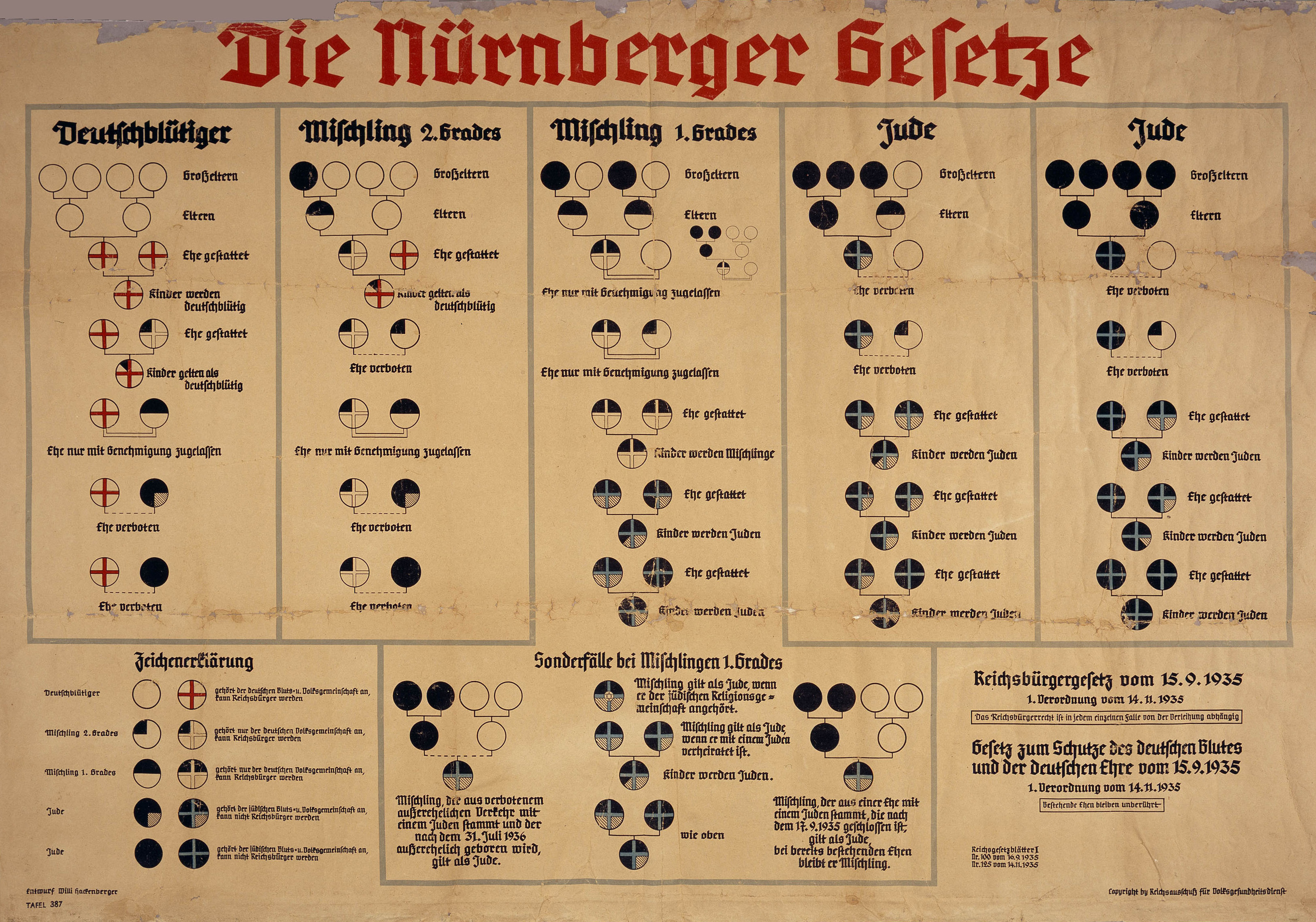
1935 Chart from Nazi Germany used to explain the Nuremberg Laws.

The Nuremberg Laws were antisemitic and racist laws introduced in Nazi Germany on September 15, 1935, at a special session of the Reichstag during the Nazi Party's annual Nuremberg Rally. The legislation comprised two measures concerning procreation and citizenship. The Law for the Protection of German Blood and German Honour prohibited marriages and sexual relations between Jews and Germans and barred Jewish households from employing German women under the age of 45. Such partnerships were considered racial pollution (Rassenschande), and the prohibition was soon expanded to Gypsies and black people.

The Reich Citizenship Law restricted citizenship to those of "German or related blood", reducing others to state subjects without full rights. The laws were a means of codifying the exclusion of Jews and other "non-Aryan" minorities from citizenship in the Reich, which stripped them of fundamental protections.

The Reichsvertretung der Deutschen Juden ('representation of the German Jews') called the Nuremberg Laws "the heaviest of blows for the Jews in Germany". They asked for recognition of their autonomy over Jews in Germany. They also stressed the importance of continuing Jewish education traditions, particularly in preparation for emigration to Palestine with a focus on manual labor, Hebrew studies, and vocational training of girls.

=== The Holocaust ===
Nazi policy evolved into one of total extermination, culminating in the Holocaust. The official public policy from 1933 to 1940 was expulsion of Jews from Germany. Beginning in 1940, the Nazi policy became a secret as it shifted towards annihilation of Jews. The Nazis internally referred to this policy as the "Final Solution", and they revealed it to non-Nazi government officials at the January 1942 Wannsee Conference. Around six million Jews from Nazi-occupied territory were killed.

== Sinti and Roma ==
The Nazis considered roughly 10% of Gypsies to be Aryan. Their persecution of the Romani people expanded in 1935 with internment in Zigeunerlager ("gypsy camps"). Eventually, 23,000 Gypsies were sent to concentration camps.

Heinrich Himmler suggested creating a "Gypsy Law" to separate Gypsies from the German people and prevent "intermingling of blood". Despite being widely discussed, a specific "Gypsy Law" was never enacted by the Nazis.

== Afro-Germans ==
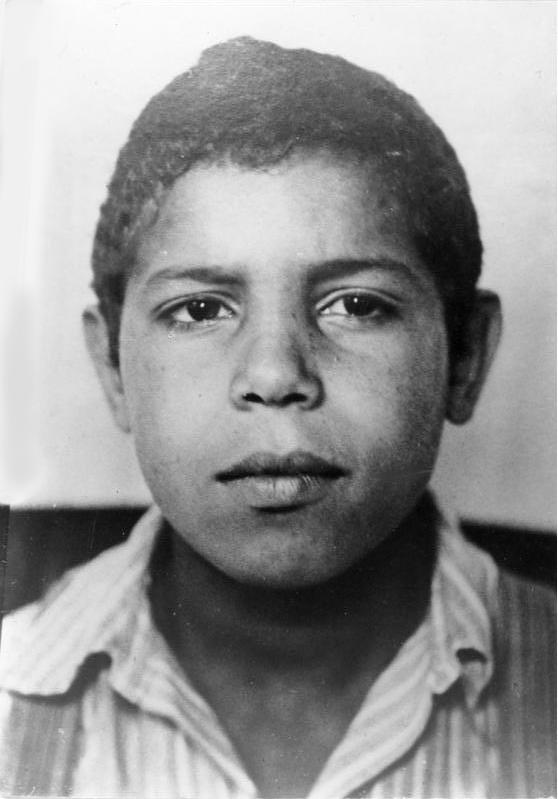
A biracial Rhinelander who was classified as "hereditarily unfit" under the Nazi regime.

The Black population of Germany in 1933 was fairly small, numbering perhaps as many as 25,000 people. There was no systemic annihilation plan for Black people in Germany, but many were imprisoned, sterilized, and killed. Black entertainers were popular in Germany, but the Nazis banned jazz as "Negermusik".

In Mein Kampf, Adolf Hitler moaned that France was becoming more negrified. He saw French marriages to African occupation soldiers as a contamination of the Aryan race "by Negro blood on the Rhine in the heart of Europe". He believed Jews brought Black men to the Rhineland in order to subjugate the "white race" through interbreeding.

The Nazis referred to biracial children of Senegalese soldiers stationed in French territory as "Rhineland Bastards". They sterilized 400 of these children in 1938. The Nazis went to great lengths to conceal their sterilization and abortion program in the Rhineland. African-Germans paradoxically had a better chance of surviving the war than the average German, because they were typically excluded from military service.

== Poles, Russians, and other Slavs ==
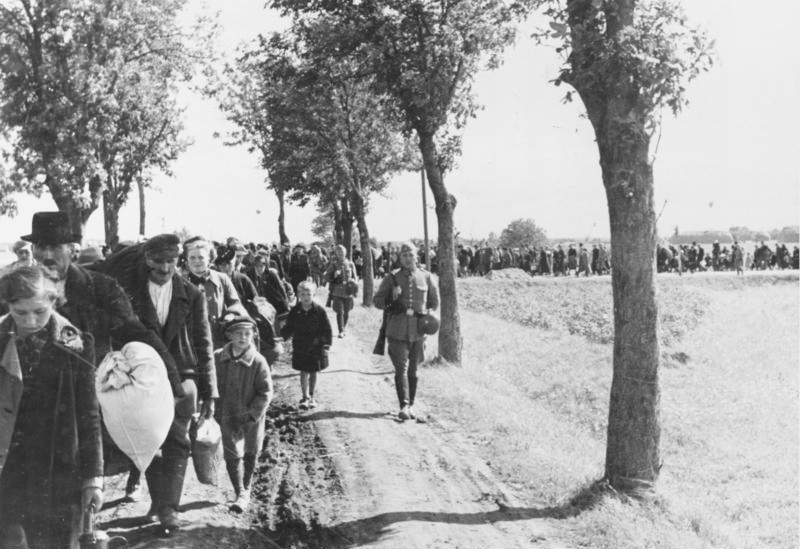
Mass expulsion of Poles in 1939 as part of the German ethnic cleansing of western Poland annexed to the Reich.

Hitler argued in Mein Kampf that the German need for Lebensraum ("living space") required eastwards expansion (Drang nach Osten) into Russia and her vassal states.

After the invasion of the Soviet Union, Hitler expressed his future plans for the Slavs, "As for the ridiculous hundred million Slavs, we will mould the best of them as we see fit, and we will isolate the rest of them in their own pig-styes; and anyone who talks about cherishing the local inhabitants and civilising them, goes straight off into a concentration camp!"

Generalplan Ost envisaged removal of the majority of the population of conquered counties, with very small and varied percentages of the various conquered nations undergoing Germanisation, expulsion into the depths of Russia, or other fates. Himmler declared no drop of German blood would be lost or left behind to mingle with any "alien races". The Wehrbauer ("soldier-peasants") would settle in a fortified line to prevent civilization arising beyond German borders.

The Nazis issued Polish decrees on March 8, 1940, which regulated the working and living conditions of Polish laborers (Zivilarbeiter) in Germany. All Poles had to wear a purple "P" badge, and any Pole who had sexual or improper relations with a German would be executed. The Gestapo pursued every case relentlessly. Hundreds of Polish and Russian men were executed for their relations with German women. The Nazis also kidnapped Polish children with Nordic racial characteristics. Those classified as "racially valuable" were to be adopted and raised as Germans, while those who failed the tests would be used in slave labor or murdered in medical experiments. The Nazis considered people living in the Goralenvolk area of Poland to be descended from ethnic Germans and sufficiently Aryan.

The General Government in occupied Poland divided the population into different groups. Each group had different rights, food rations, allowed strips in the cities, separated residential areas, special schooling systems, public transportation and restricted restaurants. Later adapted in all Nazi-occupied countries by 1942, this Germanization program used the racial caste system of reserving certain rights to one group and barred privileges to another. Ethnic Poles were believed by Hitler to be "biologically inferior race" that could never be educated or elevated through Germanization. In 1940, Hitler approved of a plan regarding the Germanization of the Protectorate of Bohemia and Moravia, he estimated around half of the Czech population were suitable for Germanization but made clear that the "mongoloid" types and Czech intelligentsia were not allowed to be Germanized.

To other countries, Germany publicized their 1941 invasion of Russia, Operation Barbarossa, as "a crusade against Bolshevism". Within the country, the 1941 invasion of Russia was described as a racial struggle of Aryans against Jewish and Slavic untermenschen to annihilate Judeo-Bolsheivism. As World War II ground on, manpower shortages prompted Nazis to allow Slavs to serve in the Waffen-SS with certain restrictions.

The Nazis also suppressed the Slavic culture and language of Sorbs living in Saxony and Brandenburg. Tens of thousands were imprisoned and became lesser-known victims of Nazi racial laws.

== Iranians ==
Nazi leadership tried to increase their influence in Iran by financing a racist journal Iran-e Bastan, co-edited by a pro-Nazi Iranian Abdulrahman Saif Azad. Some Iranians admired the way such chauvinistic messaging highlighted their pre-Islamic past. The Nazis felt that Iranians shared ancestry with Germanic Aryans. In 1936, the Reich Cabinet classified Iranians as "pure-blooded Aryans" and exempted them from any restrictions under the Nuremberg Laws. In 1939, Germany provided Iran with a library of over 7,500 books to demonstrate the kinship between their Aryan cultures.

== Turkey ==
Nazi policy towards Turks was muddled. Germany hoped to retain Turkey as an ally, even as the Nazis viewed Turks as inferior.

On April 30, 1936, Nazi Party Office of Racial Policy pronounced Turks as Europeans. However, Jewish Turks and Turks of "colored origin" were deemed non-European. A misconception arose that the Turks were given Aryan status.

== Crimean Karaites ==
The Crimean Karaites, Turkic speakers following Karaite Judaism, managed to get a declaration from the Reich Agency for the Investigation of Families that they were not to be considered of Jewish religion and their racial classification should be done individually. A few Karaites were murdered by German troops in Russia who were unaware of the declaration. Most Karaites fared much better than Turkic Krymchaks.

== Norway ==
During the German occupation of Norway, Nazis encouraged Germans to have children with Norwegians. Around 10,000–12,000 war children (Krigsbarn) were born from these unions during the war. Some of them were separated from their mothers and cared for in so-called Lebensborn ('fount of life') clinics.

== Finland and the Baltics ==
The Finns were considered a part of the "Eastern Mongol race" with the Sámi people in Nazi racial hierarchies. Yet when Germany invaded the Soviet Union in June 1941, Finland resumed hostilities with the USSR in what became known as the Continuation War. Owing to Finland's substantial military contribution on the Eastern Front of World War II, Hitler announced the Finns should be considered Nordic. He hoped the Finns would cover one of Germany's flanks while Turkey covered the other.

In 1941 Nazi Germany established the Reichskommissariat Ostland to administer the conquered territories of the Baltic region. Estonians were favorably seen as Aryan "Finno-Ugrics".

== Japanese ==
Hitler supported the Empire of Japan during the Russo-Japanese War. He saw the Japanese victory as a defeat of Austro-Slavism. He considered Japanese people the "Herrenvolk of the Orient".

Nazi foreign policy wanted to favor Japan and shift away from China. Several members of the party, such as Johann von Leers, suggested exempting Japan from their racist laws in order to foster good will. The Racial Policy Office opposed the exceptions. The disagreement was papered over by avoiding enforcement against Japanese-Germans while also granting a farcical "honorary Aryan" status to Japan. In October 1933, German Foreign Minister Konstantin von Neurath formally exempted the Japanese from the racial laws as a sop to realpolitik.

Persecution of Chinese people in Nazi Germany followed China's declaration of war against Germany on 9 December 1941.

== See also ==
- Ahnenerbe
- Anti-Jewish legislation in pre-war Nazi Germany
- Anti-Romani sentiment
- Antisemitism
- Antisemitism in Europe
- Antisemitism in 21st century Germany
- Anti-Slavic sentiment
- Aryan certificate
- Aryan paragraph
- Aryanization
- Badge of shame
- Consequences of German Nazism
- Eugenics
- Greater Germanic Reich
- Honorary Aryan
- Kaiser Wilhelm Institute of Anthropology, Human Heredity, and Eugenics
- Kaiser Wilhelm Society
- Master race
- Josef Mengele
- Nationalsozialistischer Reichsbund für Leibesübungen
- Nazi eugenics
- Nazi racial theories
- Nordicism
- Office of Racial Policy
- Romani Holocaust
- Racial hierarchy
- Racial discrimination
- Racial segregation
- Racism
- Racism in Europe
- Racism in Germany
- White nationalism
- White supremacy
- Yellow badge
- Renordification
