= German Society for Racial Hygiene =

German eugenic organization

- Deutsche Gesellschaft für Rassenhygiene
- Formation: 22 June 1905
- Founder: Alfred Ploetz
- Dissolved: 1945
- Purpose: Eugenics
- Headquarters: Berlin
- Members: 1,300 (1933)

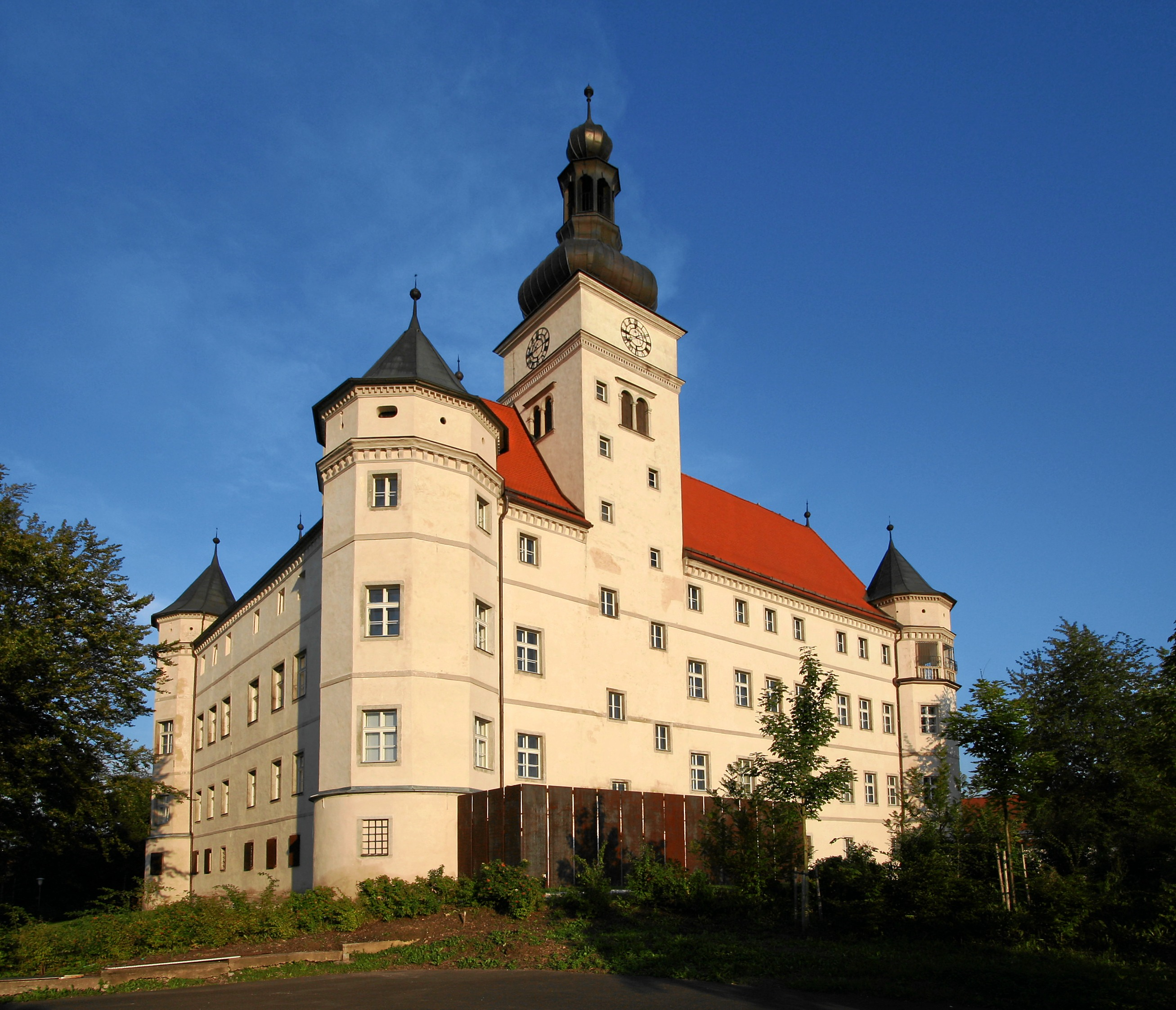
Hartheim Euthanasia Centre in 2005

The German Society for Racial Hygiene (German: Deutsche Gesellschaft für Rassenhygiene) was a German eugenic organization founded on 22 June 1905 by the physician Alfred Ploetz in Berlin. Its goal was "for society to return to a healthy and blooming, strong and beautiful life" as Ploetz put it. The Nordic race was supposed to regain its "purity" through selective reproduction and sterilization. The society became defunct after World War II.

== History ==
Soon after the society was founded, it received generous support by the German imperial government and it was not the only organization of its kind in the world. Many organizations existed post World War I with similar goals. Notable members comprised Ploetz' brother-in-law Ernst Rüdin and his childhood friend Gerhart Hauptmann, Wilhelm Bölsche, Max von Gruber, Agnes Bluhm, Wilhelm Filchner, Anastasius Nordenholz, and Ludwig Hermann Plate. The biologists Ernst Haeckel and August Weismann, as well as the gynecologist Ernst Ludwig Alfred Hegar, became honorary members.

Since Ploetz wanted to establish an international movement, the society was soon renamed International Society for Racial Hygiene with branches in Berlin including Erwin Baur, in Munich, in Freiburg with the well-known human geneticists Fritz Lenz and Eugen Fischer and from 1910 in Stuttgart, which included the geneticist Wilhelm Weinberg. The organization was affiliated with the British Eugenics Education Society under Francis Galton; branches in Sweden, the United States, and the Netherlands were also established in the early 20th century. In 1924, the organization was named back to German Society for Racial Hygiene.

The ideas represented by the society became increasingly popular after the International Hygiene Exhibition of 1911. The organization wanted to establish "racial hygiene" as a scientific subject and contributed substantially to their implementation in Germany. With both adoption of the ideas of Nazi eugenics and with concrete consultations on political racial measures, the society took direct influence on statutes like the "Law for the Prevention of Hereditarily Diseased Offspring", which were an integral part of the Action T4 "euthanasia" programme of the Nazi regime led by Adolf Hitler. By 1933, the Society for Racial Hygiene had 1,300 members, many of them academics, as well as high functionaries in the Nazi Party.
