= Otfrid Mittmann =

German mathematician (1908–1998)

- Born: 27 December 1908; Ruda Śląska
- Died: 1998
- Education: Georg-August-Universität Göttingen
- Scientific career
- Thesis: Mathematisch-statistische Untersuchungen zur Erforschung fließender Merkmale. (1935)
- Doctoral advisor: Münzner, Kühn

Otfrid Mittmann (27 December 1908 in Ruda Śląska — 1998) was a German mathematician. Starting in 1927, he studied mathematics and natural sciences in Göttingen and Leipzig, and got his Ph.D. in Apr 1935. He joined the Nazi movement in Oct 1929. and published on statistical aspects of Nazi eugenics. After the war, he published in Göttingen and Bonn.

== Publications ==
- Mittmann, O. (1935). Mathematisch-statistische Untersuchungen zur Erforschung fließender Merkmale (Ph.D. thesis). Univ. Göttingen.
- Mittmann, Otfrid (1936). Über die Schnelligkeit der relativen Vermehrung vorteilhafter Mutationen. Göttingen: Vandenhoeck & Ruprecht.
- Otfrid Mittmann (May 1936). "Zur Austilgung einer vererbbaren Eigenschaft bei Merkmalen mit übergreifenden Erscheinungformen (Fall des einpaarigen Erbgangs)". Deutsche Mathematik. 1 (2): 149–155.
- Otfrid Mittmann (Apr 1937). "Die Erfolgsaussichten von Auslesemaßnahmen im Kampf gegen die Erbkrankheiten" (PDF). Deutsche Mathematik. 2 (1): 32–55. "Man pflegt leider mit einem derartig unsauberen Verfahren zu arbeiten, wenn es sich darum handelt, ein Urteil über den Wert des deutschen Gesetzes zur Verhütung erbkranken Nachwuchses in die Welt zu setzen. Es soll im folgenden kurz gezeigt werden, wie die Dinge liegen und welche Extremfälle man sich auszusuchen pflegt, um ein möglichst ungünstiges Urteil über den Wert der deutschen Auslesemaßnahmen zu gewinnen. (Unfortunately, one uses to work with such an unsound approach when a judgement about the German Law for the Prevention of Hereditarily Diseased Offspring is to be created. In the following, it shall be shown how things are and which extremal cases one uses to pick out to obtain an as unfavorable judgement as possible about the value of the German selection measures.)"
- Otfrid Mittmann (Jan 1938). "Über die Schnelligkeit der Ausmerze von Erbkrankheiten durch Sterilisation" (PDF). Deutsche Mathematik. 2 (6): 709–721.
- Mittmann, Otfrid (1940). Erbbiologische Fragen in mathematischer Behandlung. Berlin: de Gruyter.
- Otfrid Mittmann (Dec 1940). "Theoretische Erbprognose und Gattenwahl". Deutsche Mathematik. 5 (4): 328–337.
- Otfrid Mittmann (May 1941). "Funktionale Zusammenhänge zwischen Zygotenwahrscheinlichkeiten". Deutsche Mathematik. 5 (6): 563–570.
- O. Mittmann (1968). "Zur statistischen Zwillingsmethode". Metron. 27: 1–7.
