= Hereditary Health Court =

Nazi court enforcing sterilization

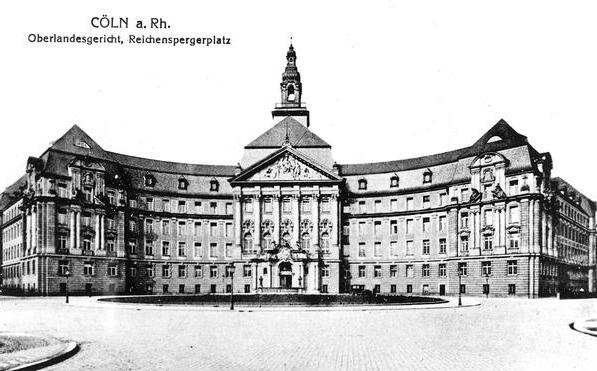
The image above shows the Reichenspergerplatz Justice Building in Cologne, which was the headquarters of the Hereditary Health Court and its appeals body

The Hereditary Health Court (German: Erbgesundheitsgericht, EGG), also known as the Genetic Health Court, was a court that decided whether people should be forcibly sterilized in Nazi Germany. That method of using courts to make decisions on hereditary health in Nazi Germany was created to implement the Nazi race policy aiming for racial hygiene.

== History ==
=== German sterilization law ===
The Law for the Prevention of Hereditarily Diseased Offspring in Nazi Germany was passed on July 14, 1933, effective January 1934. This law gave rise to the profuse making of the health courts. The Sterilization law permitted complete authority to forcibly sterilize any citizen, who in the opinion of court officials, suffered from genetic disorders, many of which were not actually genetic. When the court outcome was sterilization for the individual in question, the court ruling could be appealed to the Higher Hereditary Health Court (Erbgesundheitsobergericht, EGOG), also known as Hereditary Health Supreme Court. Dr. Karl Astel was in charge of the Hereditary Health Supreme Court from 1934 to 1937. The Hereditary Health Courts were responsible for the sterilization of 400,000 persons in less than a decade of operation.

=== Structure of the courts and decision making processes ===
The Hereditary Health Courts were structured uniquely in comparison to the rest of the Reich judiciary. Each court was chaired by a judge from the local magistrate court alongside two physicians. Additionally, those ordered to be sterilized had the right to appeal their decisions and there were appellate courts specifically created to hear such cases, chaired instead by a judge of the Oberlandesgericht. The courts were not technically independent institutions and were classified as subordinate parts of the local magistrate courts and district appellate courts. The presidents of the district courts also determined the number of deputies and medical staff members at their discretion.

Women in general were not involved in the decision making, even when it most often was directly carried out on them. Sterilizations and abortions (almost no castrations) were common responses to deviancy.

Nazi officials also tended to offer tax breaks to those families who were hereditarily preferred, encouraging that they produce more offspring. Usually it was a mix of unemployment, family balance, and social welfare that were considered for appropriate approaches.

The activities of the higher (appellate) Hereditary Health Courts were suspended in November of 1944 by order of Joseph Goebbels, the Reich Plenipotentiary for Total War.

== Influence of American eugenics on Nazi race policy ==
The Nazi authority assigned the nickname "model U.S." to America for playing a prominent role in constructing their policy on race in Germany. Eugenicists in the United States were aware and very pleased at having influenced Nazi legislation. The German Sterilization Law was affected by the California sterilization law and modelled after the Model Eugenic Sterilization Law but was more moderate. The Model Eugenic Sterilization Law required people who were intellectually disabled, insane, criminal, epileptic, inebriated, diseased, blind, deaf, deformed, and economically vulnerable to be sterilized. On the other hand, the German law called for sterilization in cases of intellectual disability, schizophrenia, manic-depression, insanity, hereditary epilepsy, hereditary blindness, deafness, malformation, and Huntington's chorea.

=== American eugenicists' prominence in Nazi Germany ===
Some respondents were described by Lothrop Stoddard, an American eugenicist, visiting the Nazi state in 1939. That day were tried an 'apelike man' who had married a Jewish woman, a manic depressive, a deaf and mute girl, and a 'mentally retarded' girl. After being witness to the trials, he reported the Sterilization Law was being carried out with strict provisions and that the judges of the Hereditary Health Courts were almost too conservative. He reported on his experience with extreme support for the Hereditary Health Court, and went as far to say that the Nazi's were "weeding out the worst strains in the Germanic stock in a scientific and truly humanitarian way".

The Hereditary Health Court in Nazi Germany is evidence that Nazi Germany's eugenic program was the most successful in implementing racial policies and eugenic ideals. More specifically, as Lothrop Stoddard stated after his visit to Germany in 1940, "Nazi Germany's eugenic program is the most ambitious and far-reaching experiment in eugenics ever attempted by any nation". Many eugenicists initially thought that the campaign in Nazi Germany would boost the influence of eugenics in the U.S. as well. With this in mind, leading philanthropic organizations in the U.S. gave generously to support Nazi research in this area. The eugenic laws were able to flourish in Nazi Germany because of the efficiency of their legislative model, which included the Hereditary Health Court. A 1939 book authored by Von Hoffman and titled Racial hygiene in the United States has a whole sterilization chapter that was widely regarded with approval in the early development of the health courts.

Nazi testing for racial hygiene was also directly influenced by the earlier American eugenics work. Harry Laughlin was known as one of the most influential American eugenicists on sterilization law in Germany. His book Human Selection had a "model Sterilization Law" that was used as a model for the guidelines of sterilization in the courts.

A rather unexpected and interesting fact regarding the Hereditary Health Courts in Nazi Germany is that the Nazi race and health administrators gave American eugenicists access to multiple institutions involved in the eugenics movement, which included visits to the Hereditary Health Courts. This access surprisingly had positive influences on the promotion of the Hereditary Health Courts. William W. Peter, an American Eugenicist who visited Nazi Germany, believed that the Hereditary Health Courts were essential in guaranteeing the correct application of the Law for the Prevention of Hereditarily Diseased Offspring.

Marie E. Kopp, who was an American eugenicist that visited Germany for six months in 1935, was given the opportunity to interview judges of the Hereditary Health Courts. She published various speeches and articles and was convinced that the Law for the Prevention of Hereditarily Diseased Offspring was implemented fairly, in part because of her familiarity with the processes and proceedings of the Hereditary Health Courts.

Evidence regarding the supposed fairness of the application of the law is provided through facts relating to the sterilization process when deemed necessary by the Hereditary Health Courts. According to Kopp, there were no adverse health effects from properly performed sterilization operations. Apparently, 0.4 percent of all the women who underwent sterilization died during the operation. This would mean that a total of 4,500 women died while undergoing a sterilization operation which judges of the Hereditary Health Court ordered them to receive.

== Sterilization in Nazi Germany compared to sterilization in other countries ==
Sterilizing disables the sex organs of the individual, making it impossible to reproduce. Procreation became a privilege because only authorized individuals were allowed to produce offspring—their characteristics were considered specifically desirable. Although sterilization in the United States was more limited than it was in Germany, German racial hygienists highlighted that sterilization practices in some areas of the United States were more extreme than those in Nazi Germany.

The International Federation of Eugenics Organizations held a conference in the Netherlands in 1936. Although Germany had the largest number of attendees, there were also representatives from the United States, Denmark, England, Sweden, Latvia, Norway, Estonia, France, and the Netherlands. When applied eugenics were discussed, the Nazi race policies presented by the German racial hygienists once again dominated.

== See also ==
- Law for the Prevention of Hereditarily Diseased Offspring
- Nazi eugenics
- Benno Ottow
