= Sterilization of deaf people in Nazi Germany =

Human rights abuse

During the era of National Socialism in Germany the discrimination towards the "Hereditarily Diseased" was at its peak. Racial hygiene was a big concern and the intent to fix it made Germany take extreme measures. People who were deaf and hard-of-hearing and all disabled people were considered a "social burden". Adolf Hitler and many others feared that deafness was a hereditary gene that could be passed on from the mother or father to the child. Germany's main solution to decrease the numbers was through sterilization.

== Overview ==
More than one hundred female sterilizations were known by the 1930s. Sterilization procedures were done by two common ways: through the vagina or laparotomy. The incision through the vagina was very unreliable, therefore hardly ever practiced. Laparotomy is a surgical procedure through the abdominal cavity which was the most "successful" in the future infertility of the women. When the abdominal cavity was opened the ways of sterilization were by crushing or removing the fallopian tubes, but the most "successful" method was by removing the uterus, which surgeons often opted for. All of these procedures were done with little or no anesthetics. Some simple methods were removal of the tubes, but because of the high failure rate it was not commonly practiced. "The sterilization offered surgeons and gynecologists a broad field for experimentation on human subjects in order to test new operational procedures." Another simple but dangerous procedure was sterilization by x-ray. In the end the choice of operation was left in the hands of the surgeon. "with a heavy heart, I let myself be sterilized again. But this was much worse than the first time. My stomach was cut up horribly. For the first sterilization, the incision was horizontal but the second time they made a long vertical cut in my belly. I've often had a rupture when I got up during the night when I was upset. It just bursts."

=== Law for the Prevention of Offspring with Hereditary Diseases ===
Germany passed the Law for the Prevention of Offspring with Hereditary Diseases on July 14, 1933. It was amended and extended on June 26, 1935, and Section 10a was added, which authorized forced abortions in women who were otherwise subject to sterilization. It was used as a method to prevent the expansion of hereditary disease. Hitler believed in an Aryan nation, and that the German race could reign supreme through eugenics. Anyone that was deemed "unfit to live" was to be sterilized or eliminated. In the case of the Jewish Deaf, many were eliminated.

Section 1 of the Law for the Prevention of Offspring with Hereditary Diseases stated "a person who is hereditarily diseased may be sterilized by a surgical operation, when the experience of medical science indicates a strong likelihood that the offspring will suffer from severe hereditary physical or mental defects." Deafness was believed to be hereditary, but there was a lack of proper modern medicine or research to prove otherwise.

German eugenicists believed that only legally regulated compulsory sterilization would solve the issue of "racial hygiene", a belief that placed races in a hierarchy and sought to keep people considered non-white from having children with people considered white. So, they looked to the United States for a model. Between 1934 and 1939, estimates on the number of people sterilized range from 200,000 to 400,000, as much as 0.5% of the German population. The Law for the Prevention of Offspring with Hereditary Diseases not only affected deaf individuals, but also those with other disabilities including mental deficiency, schizophrenia, hereditary epilepsy, blindness, physical disabilities, congenital feeblemindedness, and even severe alcoholism. Anyone sick or disabled in any way, physically or mentally, was seen as a burden on society (economic or otherwise) and was therefore sentenced to sterilization. This was a way of taking bad genes out of the gene pool in an attempt to breed the best society possible.

The deaf were reported to the authorities by their families, peers, teachers, and doctors. Children in deaf schools were often taken by authorities, and even some of their teachers, to be sterilized unknowingly and without consent. Some were forced to undergo sterilization even if there was proof that they could give birth to "healthy" children. After Section 10a was added, women were not only forced to undergo sterilization, but to terminate their pregnancies without consent or knowledge. Some were terminated as late as nine months.

The usual method of sterilizing men was to sever the sperm duct, known as a vasectomy. By the 1930s, there were more than one hundred different female sterilization procedures. In almost all cases a laparotomy was practiced, and either the fallopian tubes were crushed, severed, or removed, or the entire uterus was removed. This was called the "Hitler cut," and in many cases it would take weeks, sometimes even months, to heal. Some died due to surgical complications such as infections. X-rays were also used as a form of sterilization and became legally permissible in 1936. These procedures allowed surgeons and gynecologists the chance to experiment on human subjects in order to test for new operational procedures.

Legislators, supported by other institutions, agreed to remain silent on the subject of persecution under the sterilization law, and deaf persons and their families were warned not to speak of their sterilizations. Leaflets and other propaganda were used to suggest that the operations were harmless, comparing them to appendectomies. Even some educators of deaf students characterized the "experience of sterilization" as positive.

A questionnaire was sent out by Horst Biesold, author of Crying Hands: Eugenics and Deaf People in Nazi Germany. It was revealed that of those who responded, 1,215 people admitted to being sterilized between 1933 and 1945. Their ages ranged from nine to fifty years old, with 18% of them being between the ages of twenty-two and twenty-five. More than half of them were female. Nearly all of them were born between 1901 and 1926. Most sterilization took place in Berlin, but also occurred in cities such as Munich, Düsseldorf, Dortmund, Duisburg, and Essen.

== Sterilization of deaf children ==
In Nazi Germany many people were forced into sterilization by Nazis who believed in race purity and their right to enforce it. Between 1933 and 1945 roughly 15,000 deaf people were forced into sterilization. The youngest victim being only 9 years old, nearly 5,000 children up to the age of 16 were sterilized. Deaf children were forced to sterilization for reported hereditary deafness or feeblemindedness. Some were even reported for asocial behavior and claimed defects of character.

Some deaf children learned to act as if they could hear, some even learned to speak to avoid this fate. Although pretending to hear may have saved some, thousands of children fell victim. Many deaf children who were students in Deaf Institutes were reported by their own teachers and directors. The teachers reported, forced, and even transported students to hospitals, in order to contribute to the Nazi race cultivation plan.

Students were often brought to hospitals under pretext of other treatments, and tricked into sterilization. If a student refused they were beaten and handcuffed, some cases were reported that they were forced to watch the procedure as well. Many times the parents were only informed after the procedure was done to their child. Parents often thought they were sending their kids to get cured from being deaf, when in fact they were being sterilized or even killed. By 1940 sterilization stopped and was followed by killing which was called "Mercy Killing" by the Nazis, about 16,000 deaf people were murdered. Around 1,600 children who were deaf and had special disabilities were killed by drugs or even being starved to death. Newborn babies who were thought to be deaf were registered and marked to be murdered. Women who were pregnant and deaf, would have forced abortions, even when they were nine months pregnant. Many of the parents who sent their kids to be "cured" were not informed of their death until after the bodies were cremated and they would not even send the bodies to the family. The families were led to believe that their children had died of natural causes.

The forced sterilizations were often rushed and used little anesthetics. The sterilization process affected very intimate areas, and many victims felt maimed, violated, and degraded, especially those who were at the age of puberty. Deaf children lived their lives feeling violated and endured physical and psychological pain.

== Effects of sterilization ==
These sterilizations not only had many physical impacts, but mental and emotional impacts as well. Some forcibly sterilized deaf were admitted to neurological clinics and clinical sanatoriums because of depression. Sterilizations negatively impacted many relationships, engagements, and marriages, and often left those affected feeling lonely and isolated. Also, the burden of suffering was so great that it led to suicide.

The physical effects of sterilization in the early twentieth century in Nazi Germany were less than desirable, to say the least. Because Nazi doctors often operated on people with little to no anesthesia, patients experienced extreme amounts of pain during and after the operation. Furthermore, studies show that the patients experienced intense physical effects of the operation decades after the procedure had taken place. Horst Biesold, teacher of deaf students and author of Crying Hands, interviewed and surveyed multiple deaf survivors of such sterilizations. In this excerpt of Crying Hands, an interviewee born in 1918 describes the physical effects of her own sterilization:

"I was forcibly sterilized by the Nazis in July 1938. It was extremely painful torture…I suffered terrible pain…Throughout my marriage with a deaf husband I have had pains as a result of the operation. Even today the pains are often very intense…While other women have orgasms and experience the joy of lovemaking, the pain from the operation scars kills all pleasure for me."

Other accounts include a man who had had heart problems for years, a woman who had become deathly ill, and another man who only experienced pain during sexual intercourse as a result of the sterilization.

Of the 1,215 people that Biesold interviewed, 601 (49.47%) people responded "yes" when asked if they still suffer from physical pain as a result of the operation. Of those 601 people, 258 (52.54%) of them reported the pain to be located in their abdomen, specifically in the "groin, testicles, and lumbar region."

Being forcibly sterilized caused a lot of emotional damages for the deaf victims in Nazi Germany. Personal statements of victims in Crying Hands mention they felt a lot of grief because they couldn't have children, and heartache because her fiancé backed out of marriage because she could no longer have children. When asked if they still had psychological pain, out of the 1215 asked 928 (78.38%) said yes, 49 (4.03%) said no, and 238 (19.59%) had no response.

Emotional effects on young people forcibly sterilized were greater than adults. Male victims between ages 13–18 were 12% more likely to report mental suffering than older male victims. In women ages 13–18 were 9% more likely. Disruptions in adaptation and development among young victims and produced depression due to uprooting. Severe depression, attempted suicide and awareness that their entire lives could have been different were mentioned as consequences of the condition of young victims of sterilization. When they were asked "Do you still suffer from psychological pain?" "Are you often sad?" and "Do you feel lonely without children?" Men answered: 172 (85.15%) said yes, 3 (1.49%) said no, and 27 (13.37%) had no response. Women answered: 195 (84.42%) said yes, 3 (1.30%) said no, and 33 (14.29%) had no response.

== See also ==
- Nazi eugenics
