= Karin Magnussen =

German Nazi biologist, eugenicist

- Born: 9 February 1908; Bremen, German Empire
- Died: 19 February 1997 (aged 89); Bremen, Germany
- Parent: Walter Magnussen

Karin Magnussen (9 February 1908 – 19 February 1997) was a German biologist, teacher and researcher at the Kaiser Wilhelm Institute of Anthropology, Human Heredity, and Eugenics during the Third Reich. She is known for her 1936 publication Race and Population Policy Tools and her studies of heterochromia iridis (different-coloured eyes) using iris specimens, supplied by Josef Mengele, removed from the heads of Auschwitz concentration camp victims.

She was lesbian but only began a lifelong relationship with her partner Dorothea Michaelsen in 1945.

== Early life and education ==
Karin Magnussen, daughter of the landscape painter and ceramist Walter Magnussen, grew up with her sister in a middle-class home. She completed her schooling in Bremen, graduating with a degree. She then studied biology, geology, chemistry and physics at the University of Göttingen. Magnussen joined the National Socialist German Students' League (NSDStB) while she was still an undergraduate in college. By 1931, at the age of 23 years, she was a member of the Nazi Party. Later, she became a leader of the League of German Girls (Bund Deutscher Mädel, or BDM) and a member of the National Socialist Teachers League. As a BDM leader, she held lectures on the politics of race and population. She graduated in 1932 with an examination in the subjects of botany, zoology and geology. In July 1932, her thesis was accepted: Studies on the physiology of the butterfly wing.

After receiving her doctorate, she studied at the Zoological Institute of the University of Göttingen in Alfred Kühn. She was first and later second in her state examinations for a high school teaching position; inter alia in biology in 1936. In Hanover, Magnussen was employed as a secondary school teacher. She possibly modeled herself after "...the biologist Agnes Bluhm, who worked at the Kaiser-Wilhelm-Institut fur Biologie and wrote "Die rassenhygienischen Aufgaben des weiblichen Arztes", Berlin, 1934, and who unhesitatingly supported Hitler's regime." In 1935, Magnussen went to work in the Nazi Racial Policy Office in the District of Hanover. A year later, she wrote Race and Population Policy Tools.

== Nazism ==
Magnussen had joined the National Socialist German Student League (NSDStB) during her studies. In 1931, she became a member of the NSDAP. Later, she became BDM leader and was a member of the National Socialist Teachers League (NSLB). In Bremen, she lectured on racism and demographics. She was BDM leader in the Gau. In 1935, she was employed in the Gau Hannover in the Racial Politics Office. Her publication of Race and Population Policy Tools appeared in 1936. In 1939, this work was published by Lehmann of Munich. After the end of the Second World War, in the Soviet zone of occupation, it appeared on the list of prohibited literature.

In the third published edition of 1943, Magnussen expressed the following:

This war is not just about the preservation of the German people, but is about the question, which races and peoples should live in the future on European soil.... Basically England had no interest in the prosecution of this war, but it is a very different people, working parasitically behind the scenes and which is afraid to lose everything. In all of the enemy States, Judaism has significant influence. And just as Judaism had probably the clearest recognition that in the decisive struggle, the question of them was to be decided. The current war must therefore be also about the repression of the black danger in the West and the elimination of the Bolshevik threat in the East, which still resolves a racial problem in Europe, which all States are more or less interested in: the Jewish question. Also the Jew who enjoys life as a host in our country, is our enemy, even if he does not actively engage with weapons in this fight. …From the European point of view, the Jewish question is resolved in that the emigrant Jews do the thinking for the leaders in the other States. We have seen that these emigrants are only troublesome and set up the peoples against each other.

== Kaiser Wilhelm Institute ==
Having received a scholarship, Magnussen was suspended in fall 1941 from her teaching profession and moved to the Kaiser Wilhelm Institute of Anthropology, Human Heredity, and Eugenics (KWI-A), in Berlin-Dahlem. From this time on, she worked in the Department of Experimental Pathology of Heritage under the department head, Hans Nachtsheim. Her research focused on the inheritance of eye color in rabbits and humans. Her particular interest was the Heterochromic iris that she had examined since 1938. Magnussen used the scientific method to lead her to the conclusion that the eye is not only genetically, but also hormonally, determined. While there, she initially undertook studies on rabbit eyes. In July 1943, she was the research assistant of Otmar Freiherr von Verschuer, at the KWI-A. At the KWI-A she met Mengele, who worked there temporarily.

The Deutsche Forschungsgemeinschaft (DFG) promoted her study to "explore the heritage conditionality for the development of eye color as a basis for racial and ethnicity studies" in 1943, in addition to eight other research projects at the KWI-A. This project was overseen and the publication edited by Magnussen.

== Auschwitz-Birkenau ==
From a colleague, she received the information that more twins and family members with Heterochromic irises would be found in the Sinti people in Mechau from northern Germany. Members of this community were taken in spring 1943 to the KWI-A, where they were photographed. In March 1943, the Sinti were deported to Auschwitz concentration camp, where Mengele would be camp physician from late May 1943. This circumstance allowed Mengele to carry out the experiments (that Magnussen had done on rabbits) on people.

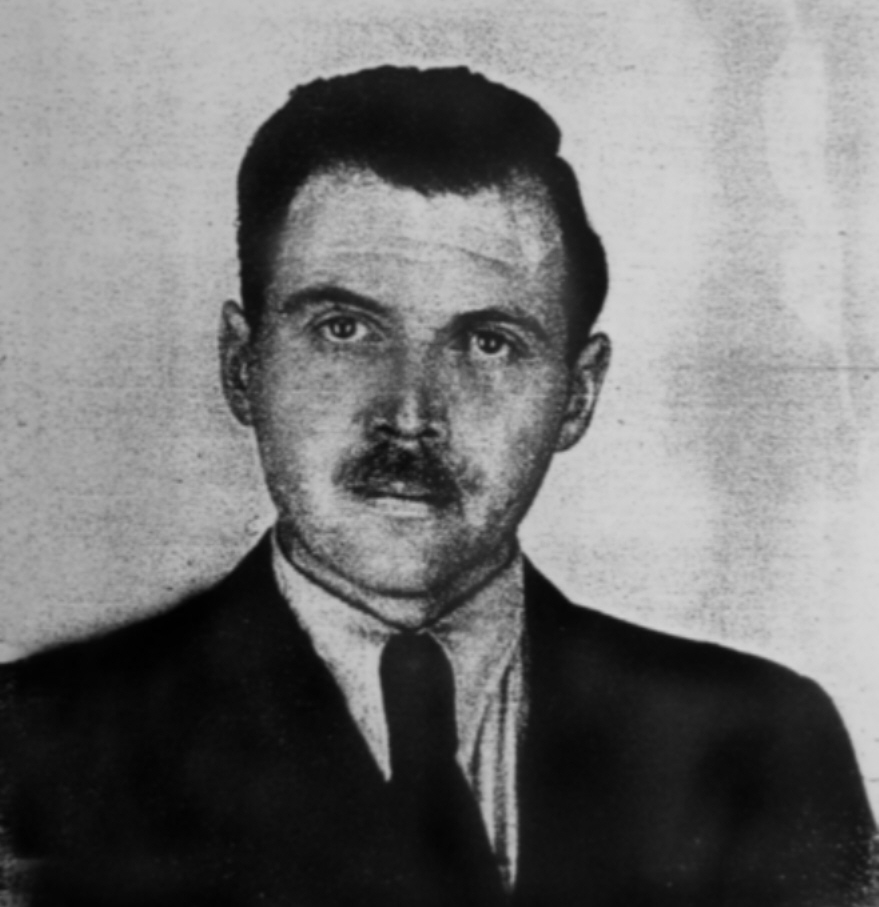
Josef Mengele in 1956. Photo taken by a police photographer in Buenos Aires for Mengele's Argentine identification document.

According to a statement by Magnussen, Mengele dealt, among other things, with the eyes of the Sinti using hormonal substances. Often, these painful interventions resulted in suppuration of the eyes and blindness of the victims. These experiments aimed at the investigation and eradication of the abnormality in people with Heterochromic Irises. In the event of death of the prisoners, Mengele pledged to Magnussen to give her the eyes of the victims for further research and evaluation. In the second half of 1944, Magnussen received the eyes of the experiment victims from Auschwitz-Birkenau in several deliveries. No fewer than 40 pairs of eyes should have been received by Magnussen from Auschwitz-Birkenau. The Hungarian prisoner pathologist Miklós Nyiszli noted after the autopsy of Sinti twins that they had been killed, not due to illness, but because of a chloroform injection to the heart. Nyiszli had to prepare their eyes and send them to the KWI-A.

== After the war ==
At least until spring 1945, Magnussen was working in Berlin. After the end of the Second World War, she moved to Bremen again and continued her research. Her completed research was published in 1949, being entitled On the relationship between histological distribution of pigment, Iris color and pigmentation of the eyeball of the human eye. She was later denazified in Bremen.

In 1950, Magnussen taught at a girls' high school in Bremen. She worked as study counselor and official, including the teaching of biology. She was considered a popular teacher who led an interesting biology lesson. Her pupils could examine, for example, living and dead rabbits from their breeding. Until 1964, essays in scientific journals were published by her. She retired in August 1970. Even in old age, she justified the Nazi racial ideology. She noted in 1980, in a conversation with the geneticist Benno Müller-Hill, that the Nuremberg Laws were not fair enough. She also denied until her last breath that Mengele would have killed children for their scientific studies. She was entangled by her cooperation with Mengele and the supply of "human material", and mired deep in concentration camp crimes, but she claimed to know nothing about them.

She began a lifelong relationship with her partner Dorothea Michaelsen in 1945. In 1990, Magnussen moved into a nursing home. She died in February 1997 in Bremen.
