= Eugen Fischer =

German physician and racial hygienist (1874–1967)

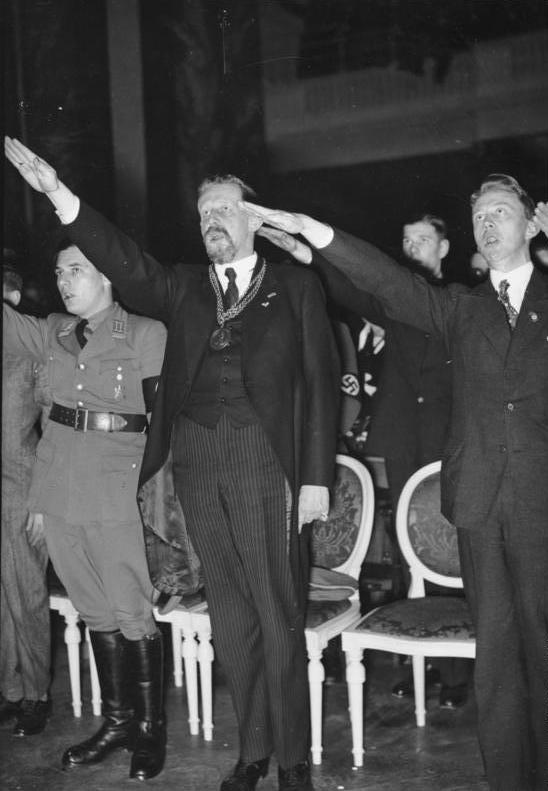
- Fischer at the University of Berlin in 1934
- Born: 5 June 1874; Karlsruhe, Grand Duchy of Baden, German Empire
- Died: 9 July 1967 (aged 93); Freiburg im Breisgau, West Germany
- Education: University of Freiburg
- Occupation: Physician
- Known for: Nazi eugenics
- Political party: Nazi Party

Eugen Fischer (5 June 1874 – 9 July 1967) was a German professor of medicine, anthropology, and eugenics, and a member of the Nazi Party. He served as director of the Kaiser Wilhelm Institute of Anthropology, Human Heredity, and Eugenics, and also served as rector of the Frederick William University of Berlin.

Fischer's ideas informed the Nuremberg Laws of 1935 which served to justify the Nazi Party's belief in German racial superiority to other "races", and especially the Jews. Adolf Hitler read Fischer's work while he was imprisoned in 1923 and he used Fischer's eugenic notions to support his vision of a pure Aryan society in his manifesto Mein Kampf (My Struggle).

After the war, Fischer completed his memoirs. It is believed that in them he lessened his role in the genocidal programme of Nazi Germany. He died in 1967.

== Life ==
Fischer was born in Karlsruhe, Grand Duchy of Baden, in 1874. He studied medicine, folkloristics, history, anatomy, and anthropology in Berlin, Freiburg and Munich. In 1918, he joined the Anatomical Institute in Freiburg, part of the University of Freiburg.

== Early work ==
In 1906, Fischer conducted experiments and medical “research” in German South West Africa (now Namibia). He studied the Basters, offspring of German or Boer men and Black African (Khoekhoe) women in that area. His study concluded with a call to prevent the production of a mixed race by the prohibition of mixed marriages such as those which he had studied. It included human experimentation on the Herero and Nama people. He argued that while the existing "Mischling" descendants of the mixed marriages might be useful for Germany, he recommended that they should not continue to reproduce. His recommendations were followed and by 1912 interracial marriage was prohibited throughout the German colonies. As a precursor to his experiments on Jews in Nazi Germany, he collected bones and skulls for his studies, in part from medical experimentation on African prisoners of war in Namibia during the Herero and Nama genocide. Fischer also sterilized Herero women.

His ideas which were related to the maintenance of the apparent purity of races, influenced future German Nazi legislation on race, including the Nuremberg laws.

In 1927, Fischer was a speaker at the World Population Conference which was held in Geneva, Switzerland. In the same year, Fischer became the director of the Kaiser Wilhelm Institute of Anthropology, Human Heredity, and Eugenics (KWI-A), a role for which he'd been recommended the prior year by Erwin Baur.

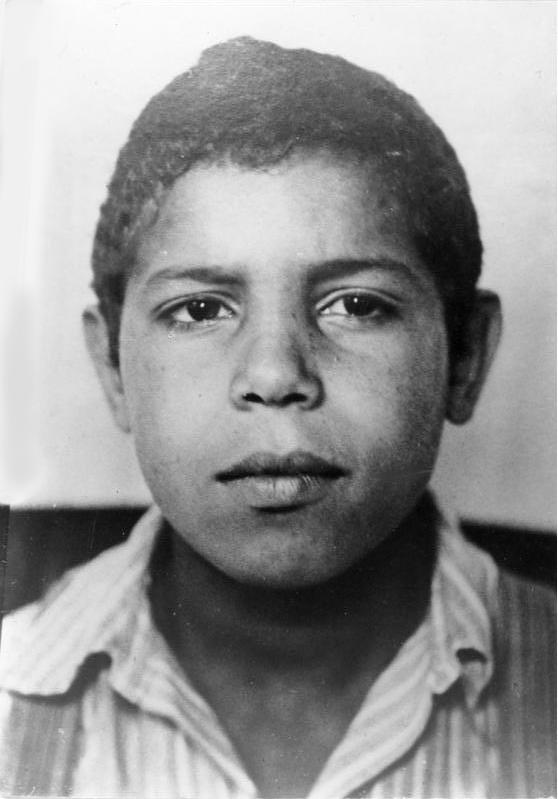
Young Rhinelander who was classified as a Rhineland bastard and hereditarily unfit under the Nazi regime as a result of his mixed race heritage

== Nazi Germany ==
In the years from 1937–1938 Fischer and his colleagues analysed 600 children in Nazi Germany who were descended from French-African soldiers who occupied western areas of Germany after the First World War and were known as the Rhineland bastards; the children were subsequently subjected to sterilization.

Fischer did not officially join the Nazi Party until 1940. However, he was influential with National Socialists early on. Adolf Hitler read his two-volume work, Principles of Human Heredity and Race Hygiene (first published in 1921 and co-written by Erwin Baur and Fritz Lenz) while incarcerated in 1923 and used its ideas in Mein Kampf. He also wrote The Rehoboth Bastards and the Problem of Miscegenation among Humans (1913) (German: Die Rehobother Bastards und das Bastardierungsproblem beim Menschen), a field study which provided context for later racial debates, influenced German colonial legislation. Nuremberg laws.

Head of Herero prisoner at Shark Island used for medical experimentation

Under the Nazi regime, Fischer developed the physiological specifications such as skull dimensions which were used to determine racial origins, and he developed the Fischer–Saller scale for hair colour. He and the members of his team experimented on Gypsies and African-Germans, drawing their blood and measuring their skulls. After directing the Kaiser Wilhelm Institute of Anthropology, Human Heredity, and Eugenics, he was succeeded by Otmar Freiherr von Verschuer, who tutored Josef Mengele when he was active at Auschwitz.

In 1933, Fischer signed the Vow of allegiance of the Professors of the German Universities and High-Schools to Adolf Hitler and the National Socialistic State. In the same year, Adolf Hitler appointed him rector of the Frederick William University of Berlin, now Humboldt University. Fischer retired from the university in 1942. Otmar Freiherr von Verschuer was a student of Fischer.

Efforts to return the Namibian skulls which were taken by Fischer were started with an investigation which was conducted by the University of Freiburg in 2011 and they were completed with the return of the skulls in March 2014.

In 1944, Fischer intervened in an attempt to get his friend Martin Heidegger, released from service in the Volkssturm militia. However, Heidegger had already been released from service when Fischer's letter arrived.

== Works ==
=== 1909 to 1949 ===
- Fischer, Eugen. 1899. "Beiträge zur Kenntniss der Nasenhöhle und des Thränennasenganges der Amphisbaeniden", Archiv für Mikroskopische Anatomie. 55:1, pp. 441–478.
- Fischer, Eugen. 1901. "Zur Kenntniss der Fontanella metopica und ihrer Bildungen". Zeitschrift für Morphologie und Anthropologie.4:1. pp. 17–30.
- Fischer, Eugen, Professor an der Universität Freiburg i. Br. 1906. "Die Variationen an Radius und Ulna des Menschen". Zeitschrift für Morphologie und Anthropologie. Vol. 9. No. 2.
- Fischer, Eugen. 1908. Der Patriziat Heinrichs III und Heinrichs IV. Tübingen: J.C.B. Mohr (Paul Siebeck). Fischer's PhD thesis.
- Maass, Alfred. Durch Zentral-Sumatra. Berlin: Behr. 1910. Additional contributing authors: J.P. Kleiweg de Zwaan and E. Fischer.
- Fischer, Eugen. 1913.Die Rehobother Bastards und das Bastardierungsproblem beim Menschen: anthropologische und ethnographiesche Studien am Rehobother Bastardvolk in Deutsch-Südwest-Afrika, ausgeführt mit Unterstützung der Kgl. preuss, Akademie der Wissenschaften. Jena: G. Fischer.
- Gaupp, Ernst Wilhelm Theodor. Eugen Fischer (ed.) 1917. August Weismann: sein Leben und sein Werk. Jena: Verlag von Gustav Fischer.
- Schwalbe, G. and Eugen Fischer (eds.). Anthropologie. Leipzig: B.G. Teubner, 1923.
- Fischer, E. and H.F.K. Günther. Deutsche Köpfe nordischer Rasse: 50 Abbildungen mit Geleitwarten. Munich: J.F. Lehmann. 1927.
- Fischer, Eugen and Gerhard Kittel. Das antike Weltjudentum : Tatsachen, Texte, Bilder. Hamburg: Hanseatische Verlagsanstalt, 1943.

=== 1950 to 1959 ===
- Sarkar, Sasanka Sekher; Eugen Fischer and Keith Arthur, The Aboriginal Races of India, Calcutta: Bookland. 1954.
- Fischer, Eugen. Begegnungen mit Toten: aus den Erinnerungen eines Anatomen. Freiburg: H.F. Schulz. 1959.

== See also ==
- Karl Binding
- Josef Mengele
- Nazi eugenics
- Nazi human experimentation
- Nazi racial theories
- Otmar Freiherr von Verschuer
- Racial policy of Nazi Germany
- Racism in Germany
- Scientific racism
- Subsequent Nuremberg trials
- Doctors' Trial
- Anthropometry
- Fischer-Saller scale
- Shark Island Concentration Camp
- Rhineland Bastards
