= Nazi eugenics =

Nazi German policy of the murder of "undesirable" persons

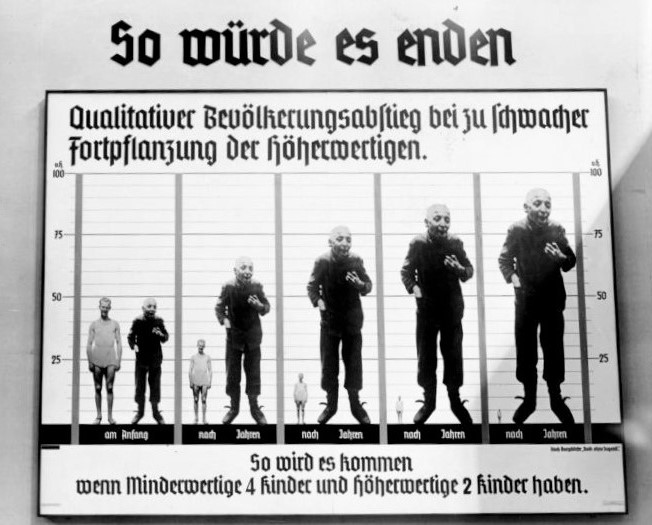
Eugenics poster at the exhibition Wonders of Life in Berlin in 1935 showing demographic projections under the assumption of higher fertility of the "inferior" (Minderwertige) relative to the "superior" (Höherwertige)

The social policies of eugenics in Nazi Germany were composed of various ideas about genetics. The racial ideology of Nazism placed the biological improvement of the German people by selective breeding of "Nordic" or "Aryan" traits at its center. These policies were used to justify the involuntary sterilization and mass murder of those deemed "undesirable".

Eugenics research in Germany before and during the Nazi period was similar to that in the United States, by which it had been heavily inspired. However, its prominence rose sharply under Adolf Hitler's leadership when wealthy Nazi supporters started heavily investing in it. The programs were subsequently shaped to complement Nazi racial policies.

Those targeted for murder under Nazi eugenics policies were largely people living in private and state-operated institutions, identified as "life unworthy of life" (Lebensunwertes Leben). They included people with congenital cognitive and physical disabilities (Erbkranken) – people who were considered to be feeble-minded. In fact being diagnosed with "feeblemindedness" (German: Schwachsinn) was the main label approved in forced sterilization, which included people who were diagnosed by a doctor as, or otherwise seemed to be:

- Epileptic
- Schizophrenic
- Manic-depressive (now known as bipolar)
- Suffering from Cerebral palsy or muscular dystrophy
- Deaf and/or blind
- Homosexual or "transvestites" (which at the time was used to refer to intersex and transgender people, particularly trans women)
- Anyone else considered to be idle, insane, and/or weak as per "feeblemindedness"

All of these were targeted for elimination from the chain of heredity. More than 400,000 people were sterilized against their will, while up to 300,000 were murdered under the Aktion T4 euthanasia program. Thousands more also died from complications of the forced surgeries, the majority being women from forced tubal ligations. In June 1935, Hitler and his cabinet made a list of seven new decrees, in which number 5 was to speed up the investigations of sterilization.

An attempt to relieve the overcrowding of psychiatric hospitals, in fact, played a significant role in Germany's decision to institute compulsory sterilization and, later, the killing of psychiatric patients. [...] Hitler's letter authorizing the program to kill mental patients was dated September 1, 1939, the day German forces invaded Poland. Although the program never officially became law, Hitler guaranteed legal immunity for everyone who took part in it.

In German, the concept of "eugenics" was mostly known under the term of Rassenhygiene or "racial hygiene". The loanword Eugenik was in occasional use, as was its closer loan-translation of Erbpflege. An alternative term was Volksaufartung (approximately "racial improvement").

== Relationship with the U.S. eugenics movement ==
The early German eugenics movement was led by Wilhelm Schallmayer and Alfred Ploetz. Henry Friedlander wrote that although the German and American eugenics movements were similar, the German movement was more centralized and did not contain as many diverse ideas as the American movement. Unlike the American movement, one publication and one society, the German Society for Racial Hygiene, represented all eugenicists.

Edwin Black wrote that after the eugenics movement was well established in the United States, it was spread to Germany. California eugenicists began producing literature promoting eugenics and sterilization and sending it overseas to German scientists and medical professionals. By 1933, California had subjected more people to forceful sterilization than all other U.S. states combined. The forced sterilization program engineered by the Nazis was partly inspired by California's.

In 1927, the Kaiser Wilhelm Institute for Anthropology (KWIA), an organization which concentrated on physical and social anthropology as well as human genetics, was founded in Berlin with significant financial support from the American philanthropic group the Rockefeller Foundation. German professor of medicine, anthropology and eugenics Eugen Fischer was the director of this organization, a man whose work helped provide the scientific basis for the Nazis' eugenics policies. The Rockefeller Foundation even funded some of the research conducted by Josef Mengele before he went to Auschwitz.

Upon returning from Germany in 1934, where more than 5,000 people per month were being forcibly sterilized, the California eugenics leader C. M. Goethe bragged to a colleague:

You will be interested to know that your work has played a powerful part in shaping the opinions of the group of intellectuals who are behind Hitler in this epoch-making program. Everywhere I sensed that their opinions have been tremendously stimulated by American thought... I want you, my dear friend, to carry this thought with you for the rest of your life, that you have really jolted into action a great government of 60 million people.

Eugenics researcher Harry H. Laughlin often bragged that his Model Eugenic Sterilization laws had been implemented in the 1935 Nuremberg racial hygiene laws. In 1936, Laughlin was invited to an award ceremony at Heidelberg University in Germany (scheduled on the anniversary of Hitler's 1934 purge of Jews from the Heidelberg faculty), to receive an honorary doctorate for his work on the "science of racial cleansing". Due to financial limitations, Laughlin was unable to attend the ceremony and had to pick it up from the Rockefeller Institute. Afterwards, he proudly shared the award with his colleagues, remarking that he felt that it symbolized the "common understanding of German and American scientists of the nature of eugenics."

== Hitler's views on eugenics ==
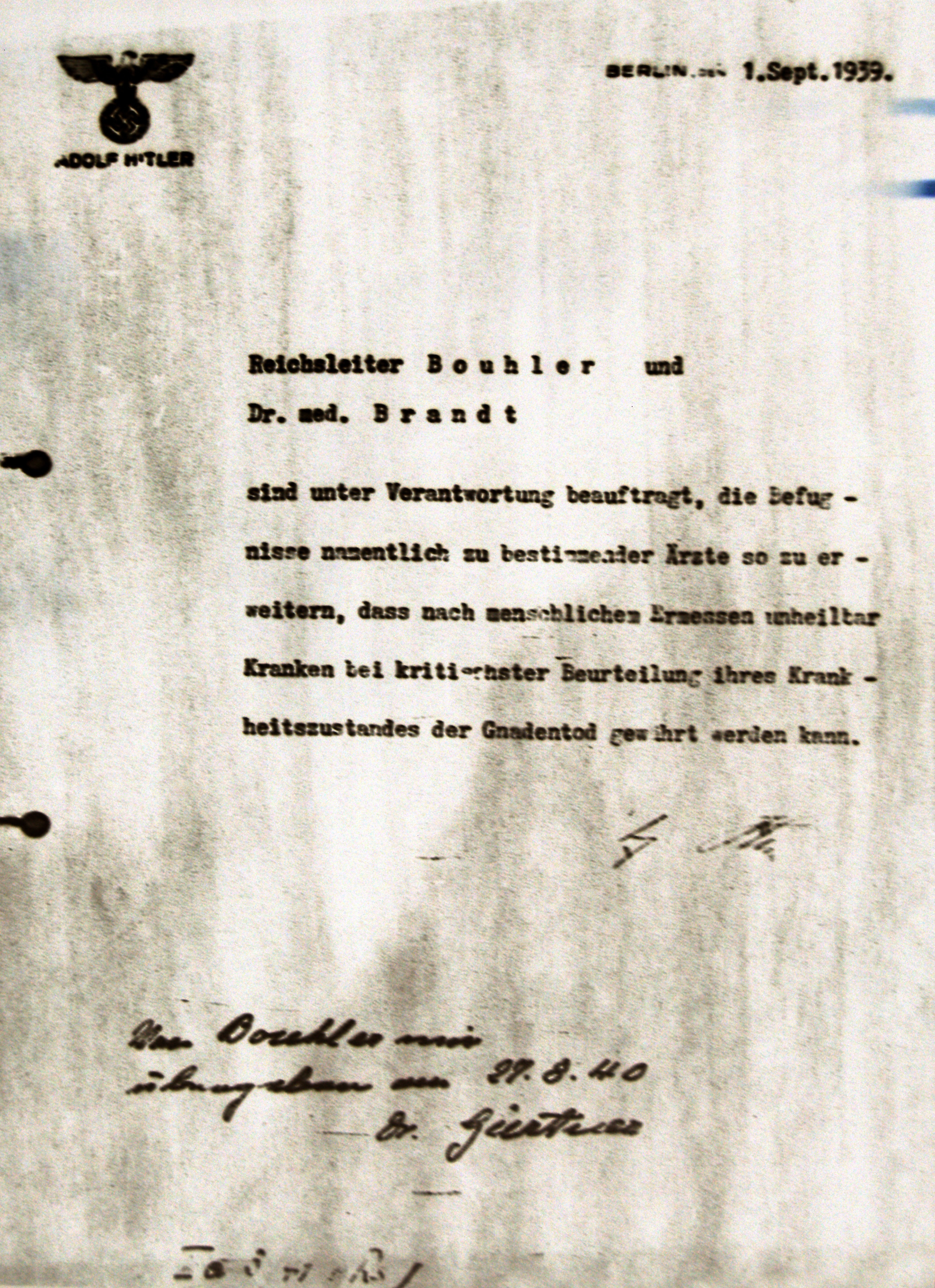
Hitler's order for Action T4

Adolf Hitler read about racial hygiene during his imprisonment in Landsberg Prison.

Hitler believed the nation had become weak, corrupted by dysgenics, the infusion of degenerate elements into its bloodstream.

The racialism and idea of competition, termed Social Darwinism in 1944, were discussed by European scientists and also in the Vienna press during the 1920s. Where Hitler picked up the ideas is uncertain. The theory of evolution had been generally accepted in Germany at the time, but this sort of extremism was rare.

In his Second Book, which was unpublished during the Nazi era, Hitler praised Sparta (using ideas perhaps borrowed from Ernst Haeckel), adding that he considered Sparta to be the first "Völkisch State". He endorsed what he perceived to be an early eugenics treatment of deformed children:

Sparta must be regarded as the first Völkisch State. The exposure of the sick, weak, deformed children, in short, their destruction, was more decent and in truth a thousand times more humane than the wretched insanity of our day which preserves the most pathological subject, and indeed at any price, and yet takes the life of a hundred thousand healthy children in consequence of birth control or through abortions, in order subsequently to breed a race of degenerates burdened with illnesses.

== Nazi eugenics program ==
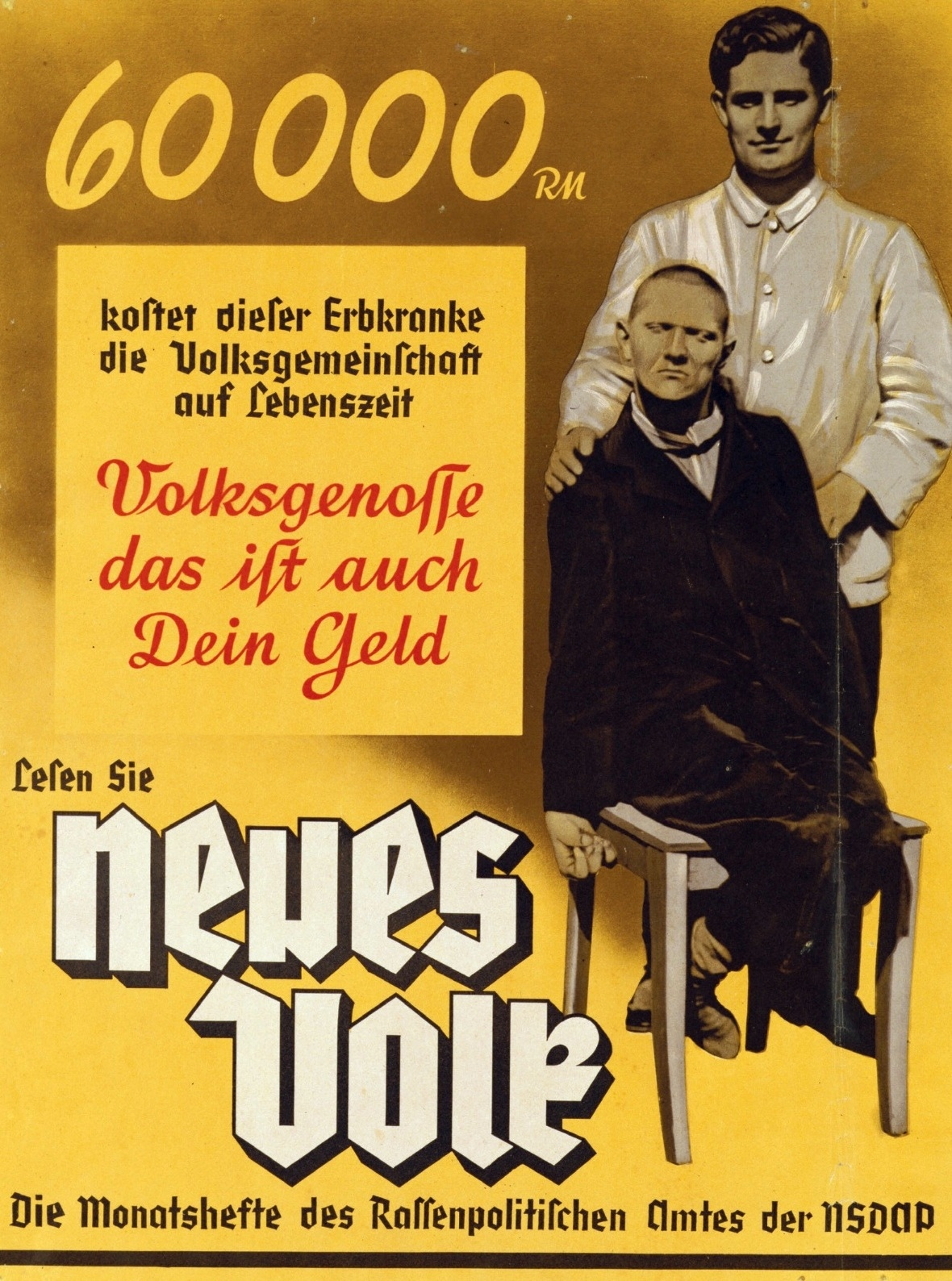
Propaganda for Nazi Germany's T-4 Euthanasia Program: "This person suffering from hereditary defects costs the community 60,000 Reichsmark during his lifetime. Fellow German, that is your money, too." from the Office of Racial Policy's Neues Volk.

In organizing their eugenics program the Nazis were inspired by the United States' programs of forced sterilization, especially on the eugenics laws that had been enacted in California.

The Law for the Prevention of Hereditarily Diseased Offspring, enacted on July 14, 1933, allowed the compulsory sterilisation of any citizen who according to the opinion of a "Genetic Health Court" "suffered" from a list of alleged genetic disorders and required physicians to register every case of hereditary illness known to them, except in women over 45 years of age. Physicians could be fined for failing to comply.

In 1934, the first year of the Law's operation, nearly 4,000 people appealed against the decisions of sterilization authorities. A total of 3,559 of the appeals failed. By the end of the Nazi regime, over 200 Hereditary Health Courts (Erbgesundheitsgerichte) were created, and under their rulings over 400,000 persons were sterilized against their will.

=== Nazi eugenics institutions ===
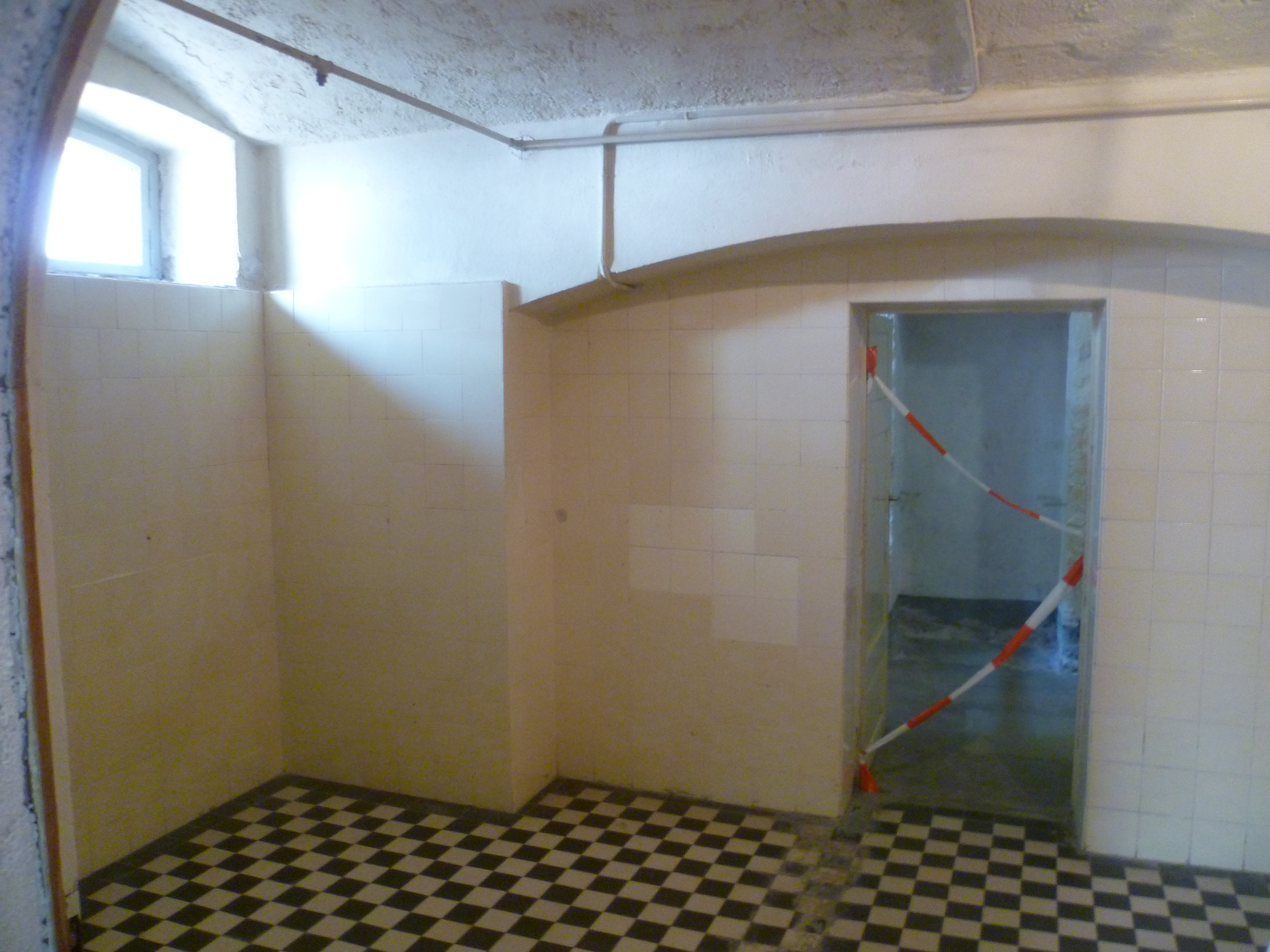
Gas chamber in Hadamar

The Hadamar Clinic was a mental hospital in the German town of Hadamar used by the Nazi-controlled German government as the site of Action T4. The Kaiser Wilhelm Institute of Anthropology, Human Heredity, and Eugenics was founded in 1927. The Hartheim killing centre was also part of the euthanasia programme where the Nazis murdered individuals they deemed disabled. At first, patients were transported in gas vans, where passengers were poisoned or asphyxiated using the engine exhaust during transit. Gas chambers were developed later and used pure carbon monoxide gas to murder the patients.

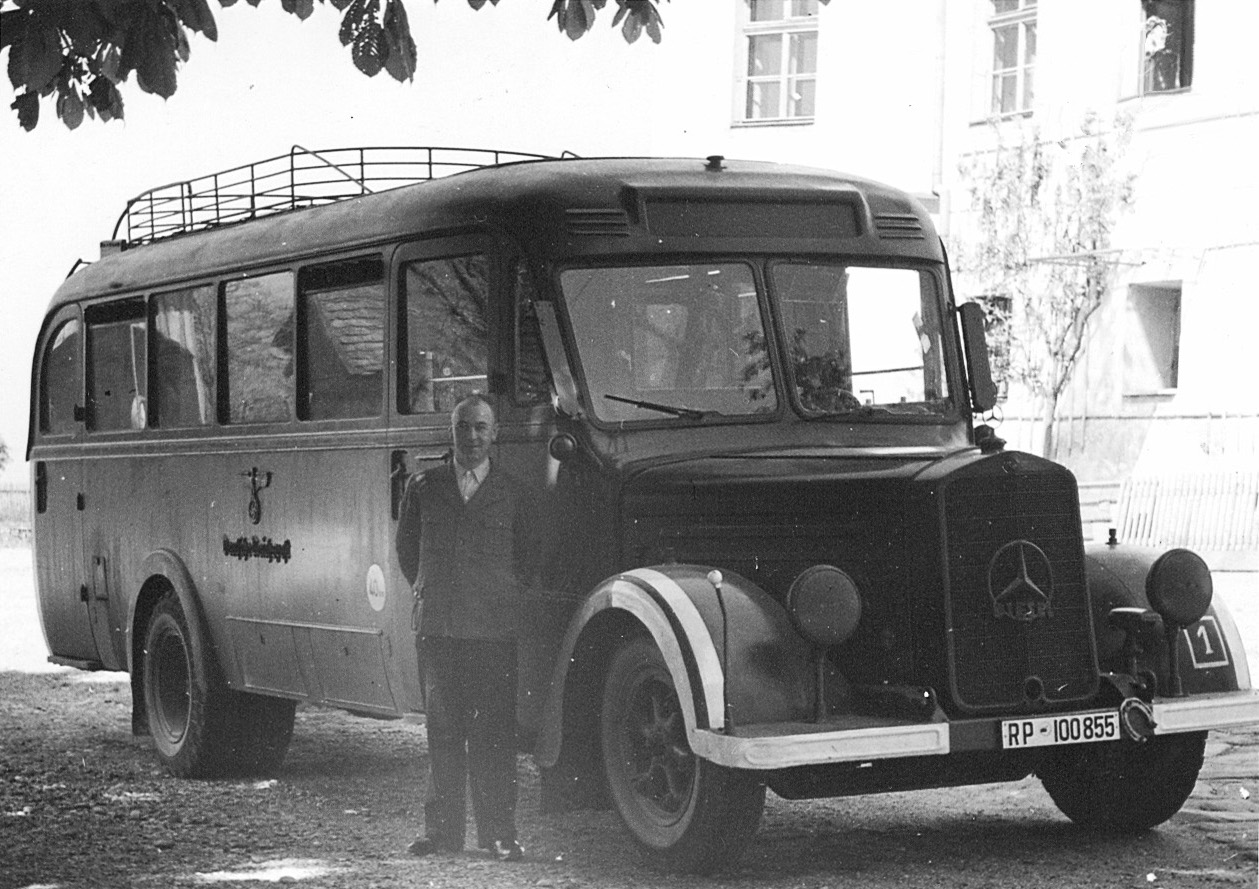
A bus used to take patients to the Hartheim killing centre

In its early years, and during the Nazi era, the Clinic was strongly associated with theories of eugenics and racial hygiene advocated by its leading theorists Fritz Lenz and Eugen Fischer, and by its director Otmar von Verschuer. Under Fischer, the sterilization of so-called Rhineland Bastards was undertaken. Grafeneck Castle was one of Nazi Germany's killing centers, and today it is a memorial place dedicated to the victims of Aktion T4.

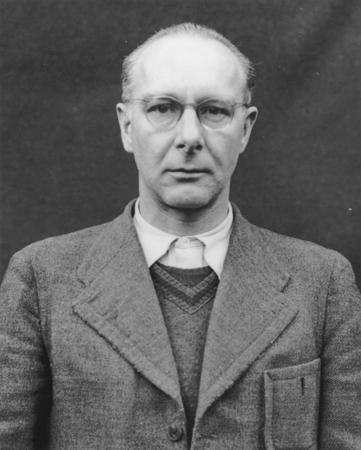
Viktor Brack, organiser of the T4 Programme

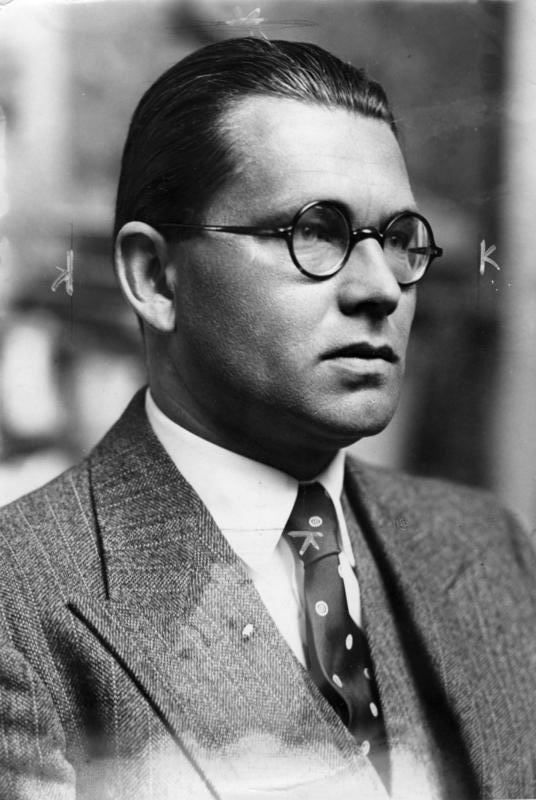
Philipp Bouhler, head of the T4 programme

=== Identification ===
The Law for Simplification of the Health System of July 1934 created Information Centers for Genetic and Racial Hygiene, as well as Health Offices. The law also described procedures for 'denunciation' and 'evaluation' of persons, who were then sent to a Hereditary Health Court where sterilization was decided.

Information to determine who was considered 'genetically sick' was gathered from routine information supplied by people to doctor's offices and welfare departments. Standardized questionnaires had been designed by Nazi officials with the help of Dehomag (a subsidiary of IBM in the 1930s), so that the information could be encoded easily onto Hollerith punch cards for fast sorting and counting.

In Hamburg, doctors gave information into a Central Health Passport Archive (c. 1934), under something called the 'Health-Related Total Observation of Life'. This file was to contain reports from doctors, but also courts, insurance companies, sports clubs, the Hitler Youth, the military, the labor service, colleges, etc. Any institution that gave information would get information back in return. In 1940, the Reich Interior Ministry tried to impose a Hamburg-style system on the whole Reich.

=== Nazi eugenics policies regarding marriage ===
After the Nazis passed the Nuremberg Laws in 1935, it became compulsory for both marriage partners to be tested for hereditary diseases in order to preserve the perceived racial purity of the Aryan race. Everyone was encouraged to carefully evaluate his or her prospective marriage partner eugenically during courtship. Members of the SS were cautioned to carefully interview prospective marriage partners to make sure they had no family history of hereditary disease or insanity, but to do this carefully so as not to hurt the feelings of the prospective fiancée and, if it became necessary to reject her for eugenic reasons, to do it tactfully and not cause her any offense.

=== Nazi abortion policies ===
The Nazi's policies on abortions were conceived of alongside the general Nazi eugenics program. Upon coming to power, the Nazis restricted advertisements on the sale of contraceptives. In May 1933, the Nazis reintroduced earlier laws outlawing the advertisement of abortion procedures and abortifacients to the public. In September of the same year, the Berlin Council of Physicians warned its members that "proceedings will be taken against every evil-doer who dares to injure our sacred healthy race." Abortion procedures were placed under strict political control. Abortions for eugenic reasons were also prohibited during this period, but in some hereditary health courts such abortions were exempt from punishment. (This consideration extended to the exemption of punishment for a Jewish couple who attempted to procure an abortion in 1938, on the basis that the law did not protect Jewish embryos.)

== Euthanasia ==
Euthanasia in Nazi Germany consisted of various campaigns of murder against the physically and mentally ill, including:

- Aktion T4 (late 1939–August 1941)
- Child euthanasia in Nazi Germany
- Action 14f13

== See also ==
- Antisemitism in health care
- Doctors' trial
- Elfriede Lohse-Wächtler
- German Blood Certificate
- German Society for Racial Hygiene
- Hereditary Health Court
- Lebensborn
- Medical doctors in the Nazi Party
- Nazi human experimentation
- Nordic theory
- Nur für Deutsche
- Racial policy of Nazi Germany
- Racial purity
- Rassenschande
- Reich Citizenship Law
- Reinrassig
- Sterilization of deaf people in Nazi Germany
- Volksdeutsche
- Volksliste
