= Kaiser Wilhelm Institute of Anthropology, Human Heredity, and Eugenics =

Nazi-era institute studying eugenics

Coordinates: 52°26′56″N 13°16′39″E

- Kaiser-Wilhelm-Institut für Anthropologie, menschliche Erblehre und Eugenik
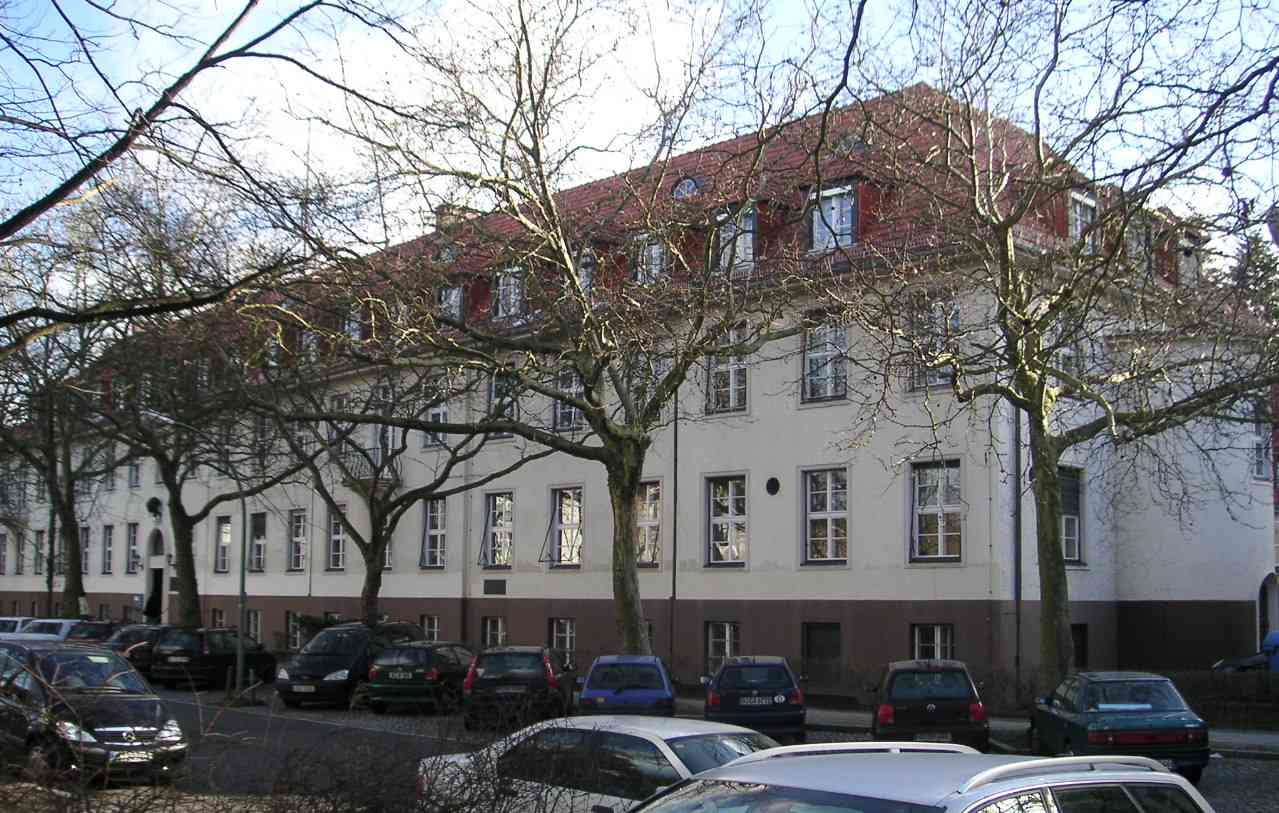
- Former Kaiser Wilhelm Institute of Racial Hygiene, at the Free University of Berlin
- Abbreviation: KWI-A
- Formation: 1927
- Dissolved: 1945
- Headquarters: Berlin, Germany

The Kaiser Wilhelm Institute of Anthropology, Human Heredity, and Eugenics was a research institute founded in 1927 in Berlin, Germany. The Rockefeller Foundation partially funded the actual building of the Institute and helped keep the Institute afloat during the Great Depression.

== Eugenics ==
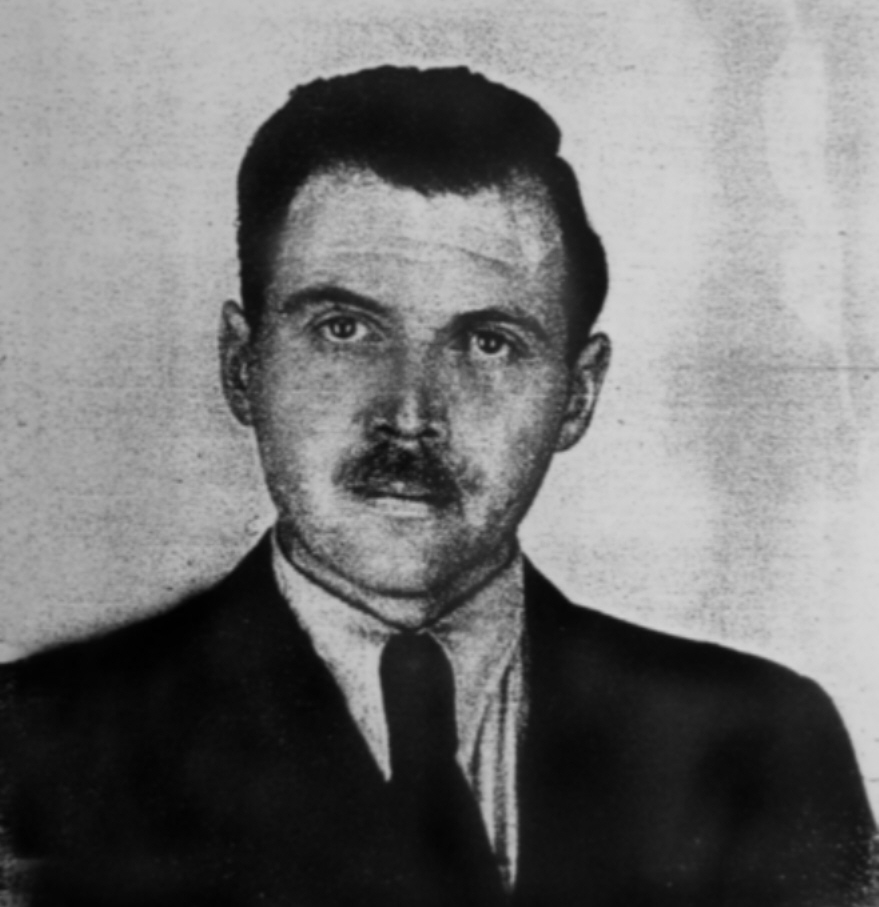
Josef Mengele in 1956

In its early years, and during the Nazi era, it was strongly associated with theories of Nazi eugenics and racial hygiene advocated by its leading theorist Fritz Lenz, its first director Eugen Fischer, and its second director Otmar von Verschuer.

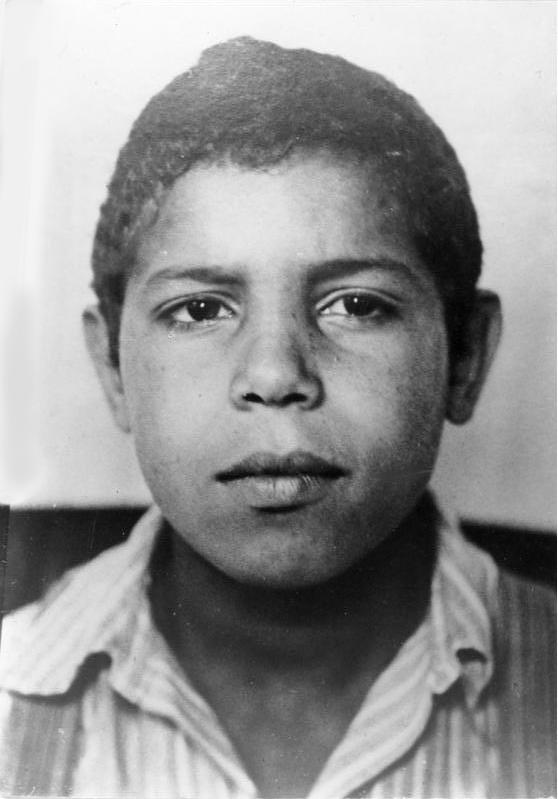
Young Rhinelander who was classified as a bastard and hereditarily unfit under the Nazi regime

In the years of 1937–1938, Fischer and his colleagues analysed 600 children in Nazi Germany descending from French-African soldiers who occupied western areas of Germany after First World War; the children, the so-called Rhineland Bastards, were subsequently subjected to sterilization.

Fischer did not officially join the Nazi Party until 1940. However, he was influential with National Socialists early on. Adolf Hitler read his two-volume work, Principles of Human Heredity and Race Hygiene (first published in 1921 and co-written by Erwin Baur and Fritz Lenz) while incarcerated in 1923 and used its ideas in Mein Kampf. He also authored The Rehoboth Bastards and the Problem of Miscegenation among Humans (1913) (German: Die Rehobother Bastards und das Bastardierungsproblem beim Menschen), a field study which provided context for later racial debates, influenced German colonial legislation and provided scientific support for the Nuremberg laws.

Under the Nazi regime, Fischer developed the physiological specifications used to determine racial origins and developed the so-called Fischer–Saller scale. He and his team experimented on Romani people and African-Germans, especially those from Namibia, taking blood and measuring skulls to find scientific validation for his theories.

During World War II, the Institute regularly received human body parts, including eyes and skulls, from Nazi party member Karin Magnussen who studied eye colors, and Josef Mengele (at Auschwitz concentration camp) to use in studies intended to prove Nazi racial theories and justify race-related social policies. After the German capitulation in May 1945, most of the thousands of files and lab material of the Institute were moved to an unknown location or destroyed, and never obtained by the Allies to use as evidence in war crimes trials and to prove or disprove the Nazi racial ideology which had motivated mass genocide in Europe. Most of the staff of the Institute were able to escape trial, most notably Mengele who escaped to Brazil, where he died of a stroke while swimming in 1979.

Although in 1948 the Kaiser Wilhelm Society was reformulated into the Max Planck Society, the KWI of Anthropology, Human Heredity, and Eugenics was so associated with the Nazis that, despite not technically being dissolved, it was never reopened.

Efforts to return the Namibian skulls taken by Fischer were started with an investigation by the University of Freiburg in 2011 and completed with the return of the skulls in March 2014 to Namibia.

== Funding ==
When confronted with financial demands, the Rockefeller Foundation supported both the Kaiser Wilhelm Institute of Psychiatry and the Kaiser Wilhelm Institute of Anthropology, Human Heredity and Eugenics.

== See also ==
- Eugenics
- State Institute for Racial Biology
