= Fischer–Saller scale =

Human hair color scale

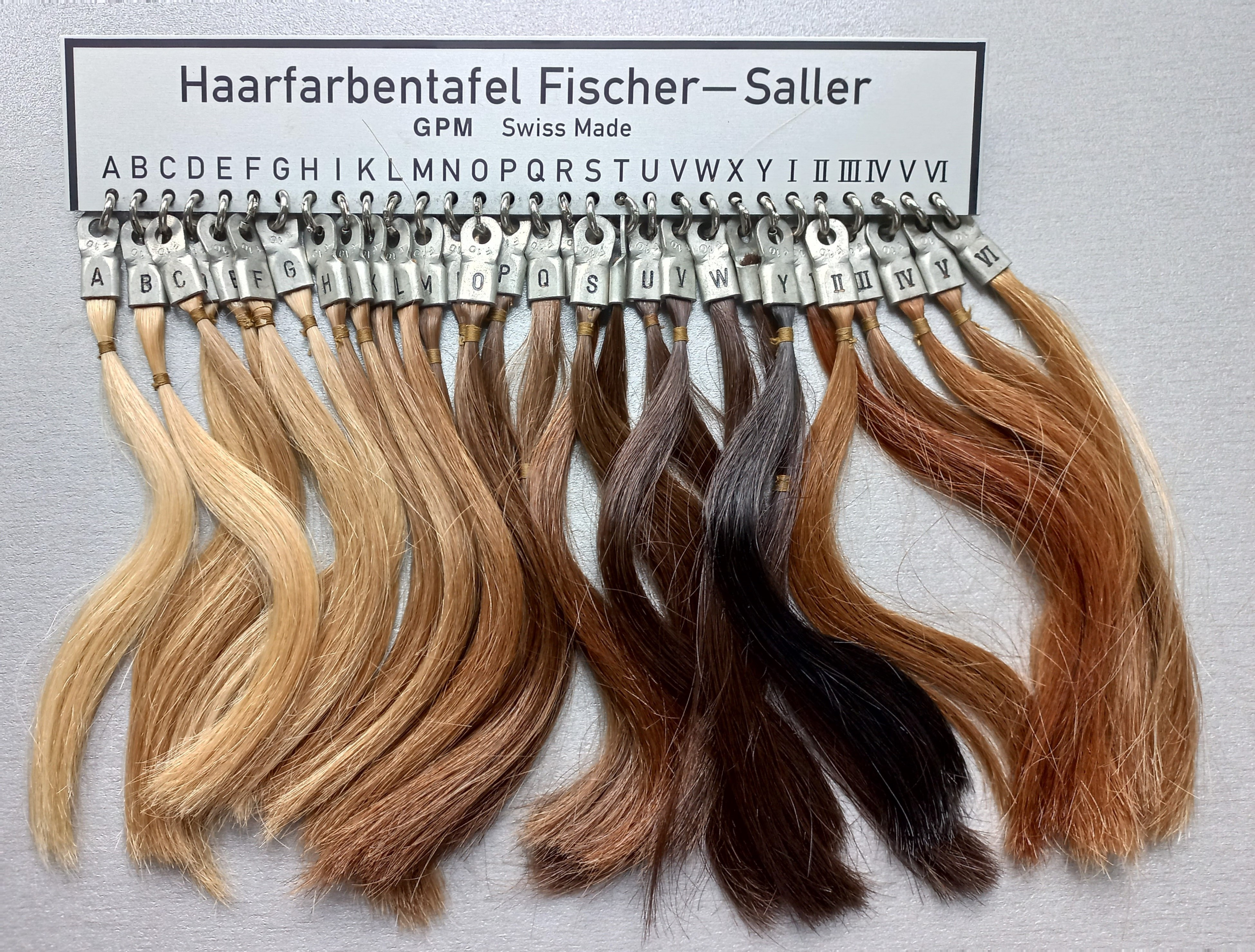
The range of hair color represented in the Fischer–Saller scale.

The Fischer–Saller Scale, named for eugenicist Eugen Fischer and German anthropologist Karl Saller, is used in physical anthropology and medicine to determine the shades of hair color. The scale uses the following designations:

A	very light blond
B to E	light blond
F to L	blond
M to O	dark blond
P to T	light brown to medium brown – "chatain"
U to Y	dark brown/black – "brunet"
I, II, III, IV	red
V, VI	red blond

== Earlier scale ==
An earlier version of the scale created by Eugen Fischer, known as the Fischer Scale, used a different range of designations:

1–3	red
4	dark-brown
5	dark-brown / brown
6	brown / auburn
7	brown / lightbrown
8	brown / lightbrown
9	light-brown (sometimes in reddish shades) / some anthropologists call it dark-blond also
10	light-brown (sometimes in reddish shades) / some anthropologists call it dark-blond also
11	dark-blond / some anthropologists call it light-brown also
12–19	golden blond
20–25	ash-blond
26	dark ash-blond / some anthropologists call it lightbrown also
27–28	black

== See also ==
- Human hair color
