= Rhineland bastard =

Slur for Afro-Germans in Nazi Germany

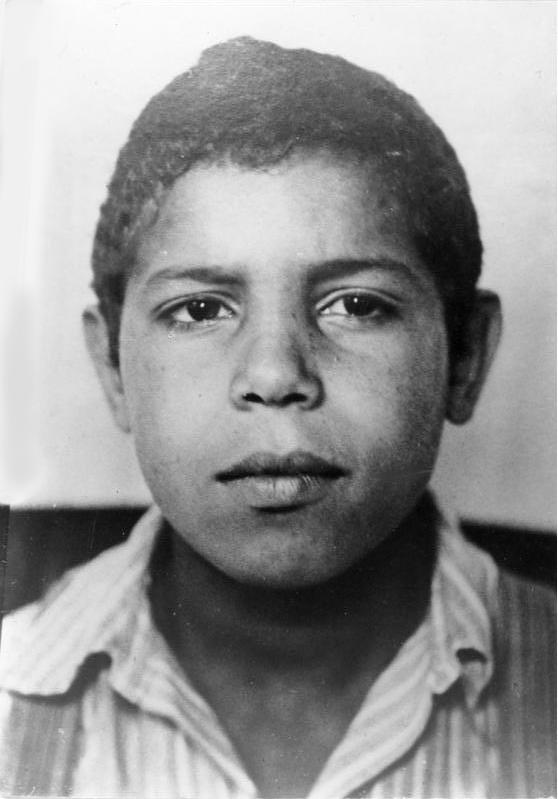
Young Rhinelander who was classified as a bastard and hereditarily unfit under the Nazi regime

Rhineland bastard (German: Rheinlandbastard) was a derogatory term used in the Weimar Republic and Nazi Germany to describe children born of mixed-race relationships between German women and black African men of the French Army who were stationed in the Rhineland during its occupation by France after World War I.

== History ==
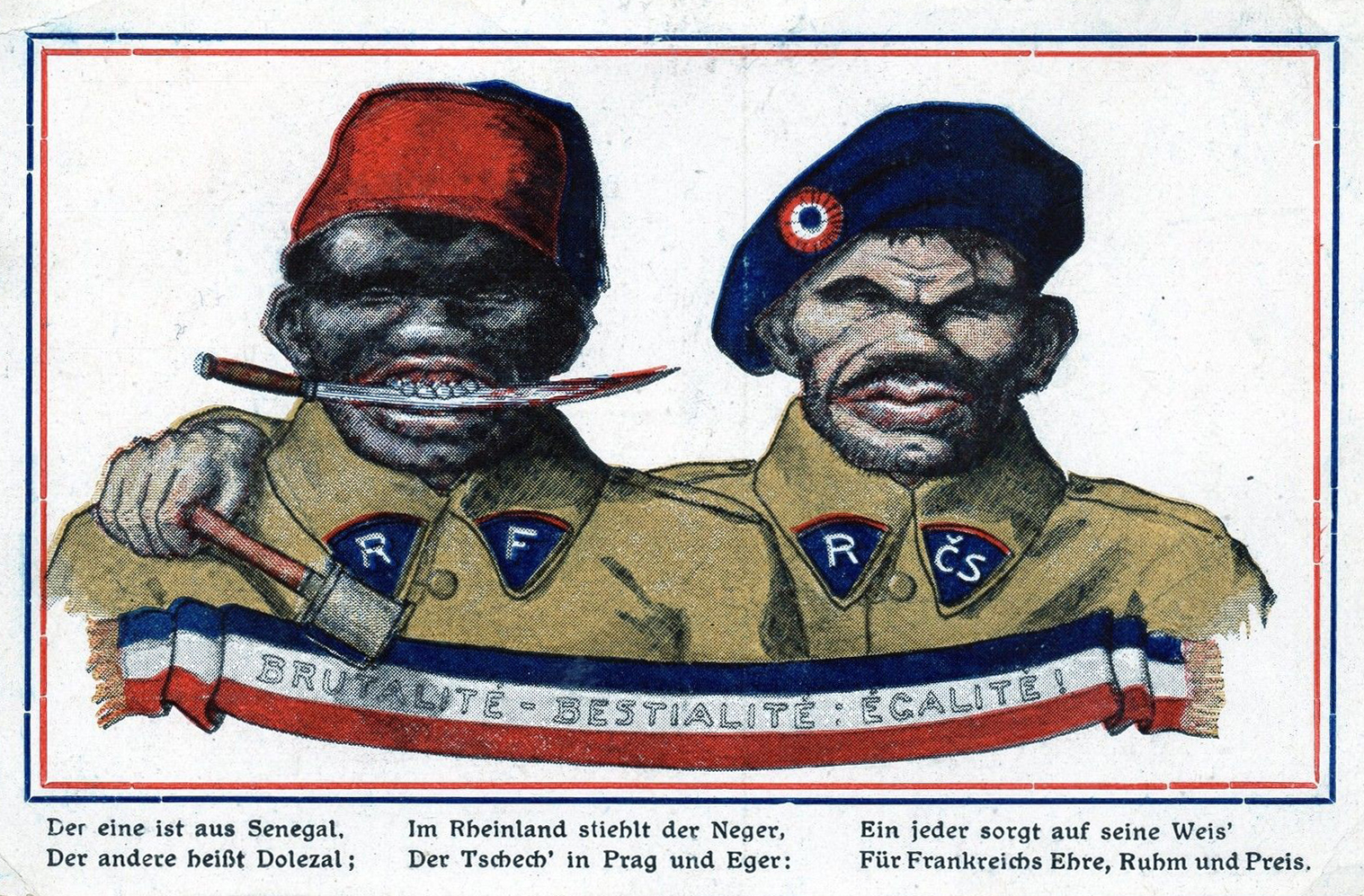
"Brutality, Bestiality, Equality" on a German postcard, in juxtaposition to the official French motto of "Liberté, égalité, fraternité", sent in January 1923. A Senegalese man of the French Army is represented alongside a Czech soldier.

The term "Rhineland bastard" can be traced to 1919, just after World War I, when Entente troops, most of them French, occupied the Rhineland. The British historian Richard J. Evans suggests the number of mixed-race children among them was not more than five or six hundred.

All World War I belligerents with colonial possessions went to great lengths to recruit soldiers from their colonies. Germany was the only one of the Central Powers with substantial overseas possessions; it used numerous non-white troops to defend its colonies. Regardless of German attitudes toward the indigenous inhabitants of German colonies, Germany's lack of control of the sea lanes would have made it nearly impossible for the German Army to bring any substantial number of colonial troops to European battlefields. Notwithstanding the exact circumstances, most Germans quickly came to view non-white Allied troops with disdain and were contemptuous of the Allies' willingness to use these troops in Europe.

Germans across the political spectrum regarded the occupation as a national disgrace. Many considered all forms of collaboration and fraternization with the occupiers as immoral (if not illegal) treason. From the spring of 1920 onward, German newspapers frequently ran stories about the alleged "Black Horror on the Rhine", accusing Senegalese soldiers of routinely gang-raping thousands of German women and girls on a daily basis.

In the popular 1921 novel Die Schwarze Schmach: Der Roman des geschändeten Deutschlands (The Black Shame: A Novel of Disgraced Germany) by Guido Kreutzer, he wrote that all mixed race children born in the Rhineland are born "physically and morally degenerate" and are not German at all. Kreutzer declared that the mothers of these children ceased to be German the moment they had sex with non-white men, and they could never join the Volksgemeinschaft.

As Germans considered the occupation to be carried out by "B-grade" troops, a notion that was drawn from colonial and racial stereotypes, their humiliation was heightened, increasing hostility toward the women and children in these unions. In May 1920, the foreign minister of the new German government lodged a protest to his French counterpart stating that "we will accept the inferior discipline amongst your white troops if you will only rid us as fast as possible of this black plague".

In the Rhineland itself, local opinion of the troops has been argued to have been different. The soldiers were described as "courteous and often popular", possibly because French colonial soldiers harbored less ill-will towards Germans than war-weary French occupiers.

In his book Mein Kampf, Adolf Hitler described children resulting from any kind of relationship to African occupation soldiers as a contamination of the white race "by Negro blood on the Rhine in the heart of Europe." He thought that "Jews were responsible for bringing Negroes into the Rhineland, with the ultimate idea of bastardizing the white race which they hate and thus lowering its cultural and political level so that the Jew might dominate." He also implied that this was a plot on the part of the French, since the population of France was being increasingly "negrified".

== Colonial legacy ==
Most of the tiny multiracial population in Germany at that time were children of German settlers and missionaries in the former German colonies in Sub-Saharan Africa and Melanesia, who had married local women or had children with them out of wedlock. With the loss of the German colonial empire after World War I, some of these colonists returned to Germany with their mixed-race families.

While the black population of Nazi Germany was small – 20–25,000 in a population of over 65 million – the Nazis decided to take action against those in the Rhineland. They despised black culture, which they considered inferior, and sought to prohibit "traditionally black" musical genres such as American jazz as being "corrupt negro music".

No official laws were enacted against the black population, or against the children of mixed parentage, as they were born from marriages and informal unions that preceded the Nuremberg laws of September 1935. The Nuremberg laws prohibited miscegenation. Future sexual relations and mixed marriages, between Aryans and non-Aryans were banned. Persons of mixed parentage were deprived completely of the right to marry.

The government established the Sonder Kommission Nr.3 ("Special Commission 3") and appointed Eugen Fischer, of the Kaiser Wilhelm Institute of Anthropology, Human Heredity, and Eugenics, to head it. He was tasked with preventing procreation and reproduction by Rhineland bastards. It was decided that anyone so deemed would be sterilized under the 1933 Law for the Prevention of Hereditarily Diseased Offspring.

The program began in 1937, when local officials were asked to identify all Rhineland bastards under their jurisdiction. All together, some 800 children of mixed parentage were arrested and sterilized. According to Susan Samples, the Nazis went to great lengths to conceal their sterilization and abortion program.

== Representation in other media ==
- Esi Edugyan's novel, Half-Blood Blues (2011), features a black jazz trumpet player in Berlin, who plays with African Americans, a German Jew, and a white German. He is swept up by the Nazis as a Rhineland bastard.
- Where Hands Touch (2018) directed by Amma Asante features protagonist Leyna, portrayed by Amandla Stenberg, who was conceived in the post-WWI occupation of Germany to a black French soldier and a white German woman.

== See also ==
- Afro-Germans
- Degenerate music
- Hans Massaquoi
- Hans Hauck
- Kaiser Wilhelm Institute of Anthropology, Human Heredity, and Eugenics
- Mischlingskinder
- Nuremberg Laws
- Nazi eugenics
- Nazism and race
- Negermusik
- Persecution of black people in Nazi Germany
- Wartime sexual violence
