= Law for the Prevention of Hereditarily Diseased Offspring =

1933 compulsory sterilisation law in Nazi Germany

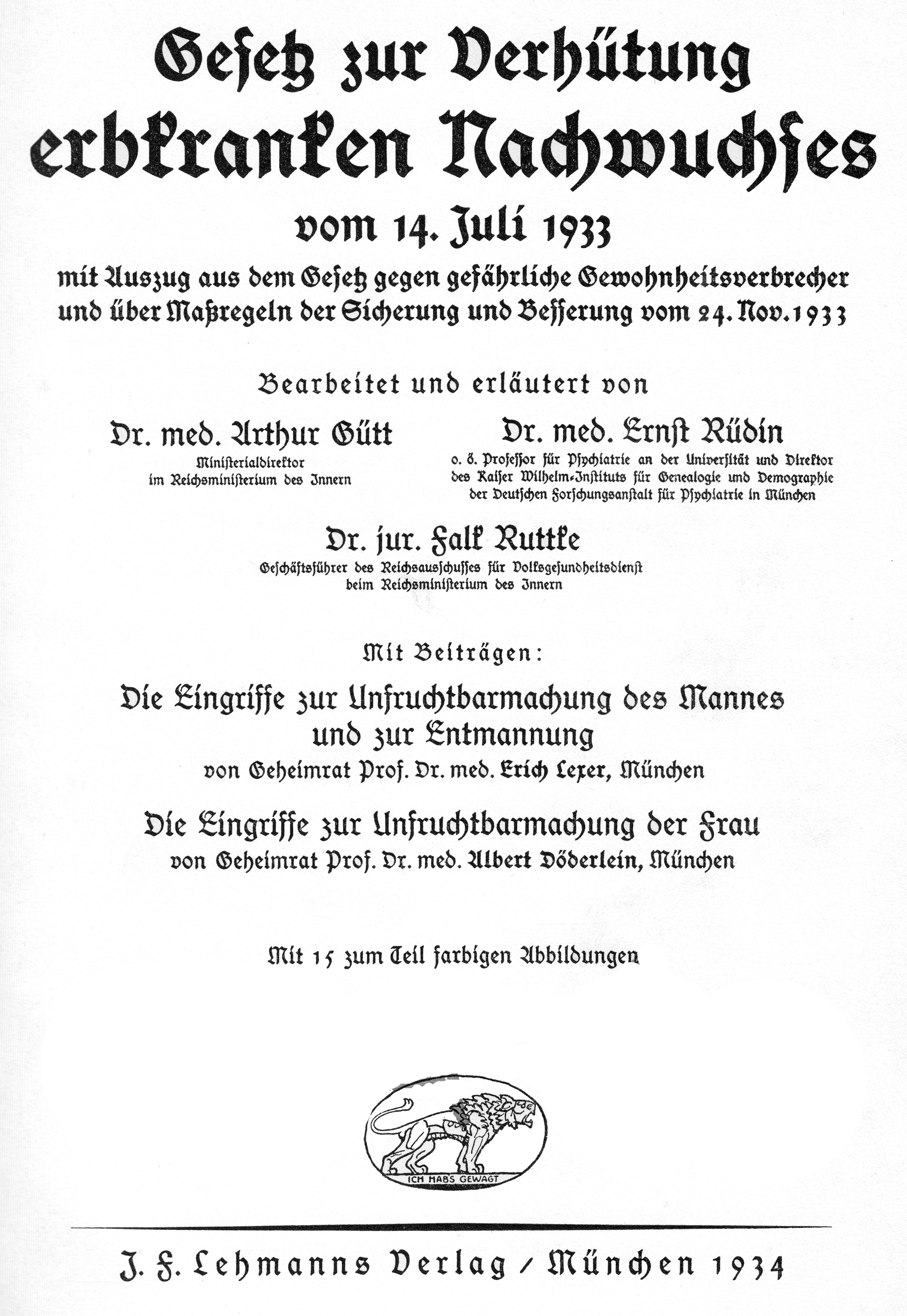
Gütt-Rüdin-Ruttke a

Law for the Prevention of Genetically Diseased Offspring (German: Gesetz zur Verhütung erbkranken Nachwuchses) or "Sterilisation Law" was a statute in Nazi Germany enacted on 14 July 1933, (and made active in January 1934) which allowed the compulsory sterilisation of any citizen who in the opinion of a "Genetic Health Court" (Erbgesundheitsgericht) suffered from a list of alleged genetic disorders – many of which were not, in fact, genetic. The elaborate interpretive commentary on the law was written by three dominant figures in the racial hygiene movement: Ernst Rüdin, Arthur Gütt and the lawyer Falk Ruttke.

While it has close resemblances with the American Model Eugenical Sterilization Law developed by Harry H. Laughlin, the law itself was initially drafted in 1932, at the end of the Weimar Republic period, by a committee led by the Prussian health board.

== Operation of the law ==
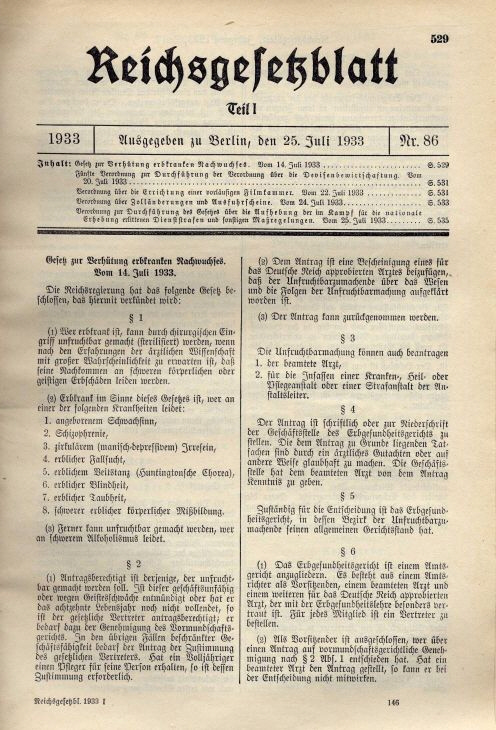
Reich Law Gazette on 25 July 1933: Law for the Prevention of Genetically Diseased Offspring.

The basic provisions of the 1933 law stated that:

(1) Any person suffering from a hereditary disease may be rendered incapable of procreation by means of a surgical operation (sterilization), if the experience of medical science shows that it is highly probable that his descendants would suffer from some serious physical or mental hereditary defect.

(2) For the purposes of this law, any person will be considered as hereditarily diseased who is suffering from any one of the following diseases:–

(1) Congenital Mental Deficiency,
(2) Schizophrenia,
(3) Manic-Depressive Insanity,
(4) Hereditary Epilepsy,
(5) Hereditary Chorea (Huntington's),
(6) Hereditary Blindness,
(7) Hereditary Deafness,
(8) Any severe hereditary deformity.

(3) Any person suffering from severe alcoholism may be also rendered incapable of procreation.

The law applied to anyone in the general population, making its scope significantly larger than the compulsory sterilisation laws in the United States, which generally were only applicable on people in psychiatric hospitals or prisons.

The 1933 law created a large number of "Genetic Health Courts" (German: Erbgesundheitsgericht, EGG), consisting of a judge, a medical officer, and medical practitioner, which "shall decide at its own discretion after considering the results of the whole proceedings and the evidence tendered". If the court decided that the person in question was to be sterilised, the decision could be appealed to the "Higher Genetic Health Court" (German: Erbgesundheitsobergericht, EGOG). If the appeal failed, the sterilization was to be carried out, with the law specifying that "the use of force is permissible". The law also required that people seeking voluntary sterilizations also go through the courts.

There were three amendments by 1935, most making minor adjustments to how the statute operated or clarifying bureaucratic aspects (such as who paid for the operations). The most significant changes allowed the Higher Court to renounce a patient's right to appeal, and to fine physicians who did not report patients who they knew would qualify for sterilisation under the law. The law also enforced sterilization on the so-called "Rhineland bastards," the mixed-race children of German civilians and French African soldiers who helped occupy the Rhineland.

At the time of its enaction, the German government pointed to the success of sterilisation laws elsewhere, especially the work in California documented by the American eugenicists E. S. Gosney and Paul Popenoe, as evidence of the humaneness and efficacy of such laws. Eugenicists abroad admired the German law for its legal and ideological clarity. Popenoe himself wrote that "the German law is well drawn and, in form, may be considered better than the sterilization laws of most American states", and trusted in the German government's "conservative, sympathetic, and intelligent administration" of the law, praising the "scientific leadership" of the Nazis. The German mathematician Otfrid Mittmann defended the law against "unfavorable judgements".

In the first year of the law's operation, 1934, 84,600 cases were brought to Genetic Health Courts, with 62,400 forced sterilisations. Nearly 4,000 people appealed against the decisions of sterilisation authorities; 3,559 of the appeals failed. In 1935, it was 88,100 trials and 71,700 sterilizations. By the end of the Nazi regime, over 200 "Genetic Health Courts" were created, and under their rulings over 400,000 people were sterilized against their will.

Along with the law, Adolf Hitler personally decriminalised abortion in case of fetuses having racial or hereditary defects for doctors, while the abortion of healthy "pure" German, "Aryan" unborn remained strictly forbidden.

== See also ==
- Life unworthy of life
- Aktion T4
- Nazi eugenics
- Eugenics in the United States
