= Henriette von Schirach =

German writer and wife of Baldur von Schirach (1913–1992)

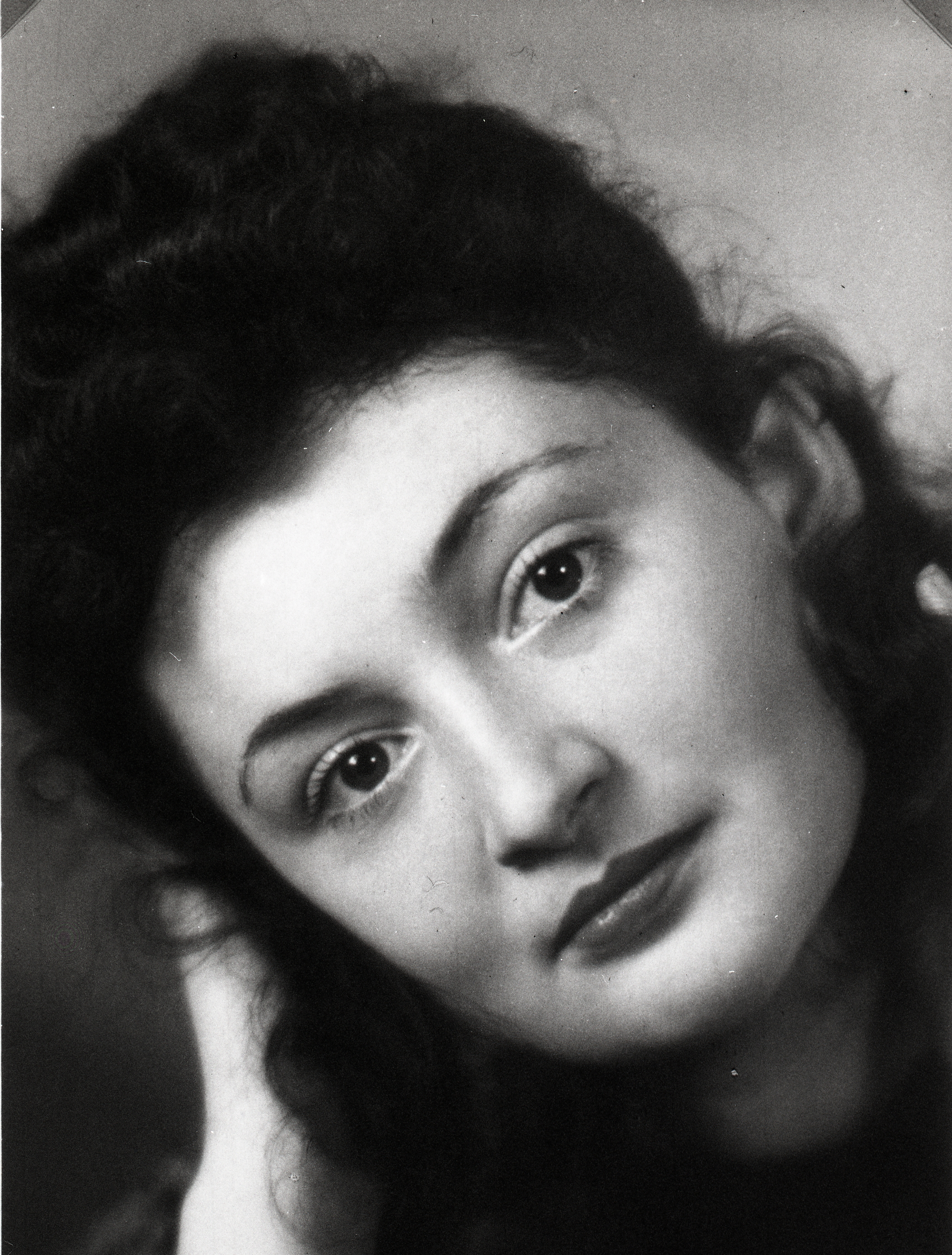
- Born: Henriette Hoffmann; 2 February 1913
- Died: 18 January 1992 (aged 78)
- Occupation: writer
- Known for: one of the few people known to have challenged Adolf Hitler personally about the Holocaust
- Spouse: Baldur von Schirach (m. 1932; div. 1949)
- Parents: Heinrich Hoffmann (father); Therese "Nelly“ Baumann (mother)

Henriette "Henny" von Schirach (née Hoffmann; 2 February 1913 – 18 January 1992) was a German writer and wife of Baldur von Schirach, former Reichsjugendführer (Reich Youth Leader) and Gauleiter in Vienna. Henriette von Schirach is one of the few people known to have challenged Adolf Hitler personally about the Holocaust.

== Early life ==
Henriette Hoffmann was the eldest child of Adolf Hitler's personal photographer Heinrich Hoffmann and was born to his first wife, Therese "Nelly“ Baumann (1886–1928), a former singer and actress. Along with her brother Heinrich Jr ("Heini") (1916–1988), she spent her childhood in Schwabing. Her house was an early Nazi stronghold, and in 1920 her father, a nationalist and anti-Semitic German Workers' Party (DAP) member joined its successor, the Nazi Party. Henriette was nine years of age when she first met Hitler, who frequently came to the Hoffmann house for dinner. Hitler may have made a pass at her when she was 17:

He gave himself great airs, with his dark leather coat, his whip and his Mercedes, whose driver waited for him in front of the door. After dinner Hitler—at that time he was still Herr Hitler to us—sat down at the piano and played some Wagner followed by some Verdi. "Do you recognize the leitmotiv of 'La Forza del Destino'?" He addressed me as Du, for I was only seventeen and he was over forty... Finally, to my great surprise, he asked me with a very serious air: 'Will you kiss me?' I was chiefly struck by the fact that he had said Sie to me this time—the first time in our acquaintance. Yet as he put his face down to mine, I said No. He turned round and went out, closing the door behind him. When my father returned to the house, I told him of the incident. He laughed in my face and declared, 'You're imagining things, you silly goose.'

From 1923 onwards, her father became the personal photographer of Hitler and made a fortune selling images of Hitler. In 1931, Henriette met Baldur von Schirach, the former leader of the Nazi Student League and the youngest of Hitler's entourage. The couple married on 31 March 1932 in Munich, with Adolf Hitler and Ernst Röhm as witnesses. The reception took place in Hitler's private apartment.

Henriette gave birth to four children: Angelika Benedicta (born 1933), Klaus (born 1935), Robert Benedict Wolf (1938–1980), and Richard (1942–2023). Henriette identified herself with the goals of her husband, who held sole control over the educational system of the German Reich. He was appointed by Hitler as Gauleiter and Reich Governor of Reichsgau Wien, and moved with his family to Vienna.

== Confrontation with Hitler ==
In 1943, Henriette saw a group of Jewish women deported from Amsterdam. An SS soldier had offered to sell her valuables stolen from them. She thought she could speak openly to Hitler, having known him since she was a child. When she raised the issue during a visit to the Berghof on 24 June 1943, Hitler was enraged: "That's all I need, you coming to me with this sentimental twaddle. What concern are these Jewish women to you?" The Schirachs left in disgrace, and were never invited to the Berghof again.

There are several versions of this meeting. In her 1975 memoir "The Price of Glory", Henriette described Hitler as saying "You're sentimental... what have the Jews in Holland got to do with you? It's all sentimentality, humanity claptrap. You have to learn to hate..." Her husband Baldur von Schirach described the incident at the Nuremberg trials (although Henriette had already described the incident in public before then): "The silence was icy, and after a short time Hitler merely said, 'This is pure sentimentality.' That was all. No further conversation took place that evening. Hitler retired earlier than usual." According to Baldur von Schirach, he and Henriette had planned the confrontation to take place over three evenings, beginning with a discussion of Ukraine, with Henriette's protest on the first or second evening, and a discussion of Vienna on the third evening.

According to Hitler's Luftwaffe adjutant Nicolaus von Below, earlier in the day Baldur von Schirach had argued that the war had to be stopped. Hitler later said, "He knows as well as I do that there is no way out. I might as well shoot myself in the head as think of negotiating peace." Hitler made it clear he no longer wanted anything to do with Schirach.

In a 1989 BBC documentary "The Fatal Attraction of Adolf Hitler", Henriette recounted what had happened:

"So I told him what I had seen. His reply was, 'You are sentimental.' Then there was a terrible row. He stood up, I stood up, I said, 'Herr Hitler, you ought not to be doing that.' I thought I could allow myself to say such a thing because I had known him for so long. I have hurt him deeply, what's more in front of other men who were there. Then Hitler said: 'Every day 10,000 of my best soldiers die on the battlefield, while the others carry on living in the camps. That means the biological balance in Europe is not right anymore.'"

In the ZDF documentary Hitler's Henchmen (episode "Schirach, Corrupter of the Youth"), she recounted, "The German officers there said to me, 'When you see Hitler, tell him that what he's doing in Holland is crazy. We've made enemies of the Dutch. We're behaving badly, locking people up.' I was horrified. I hadn't known. I said, 'I've seen that we're doing terrible things and the soldiers are ashamed, and we're...' Then there was a terrible quarrel."

The incident was also recounted by Traudl Junge, Hitler's last private secretary, in her memoir Until the Final Hour and documentaries such as Blind Spot: Hitler's Secretary. Junge said, "The Führer got up, and said something like 'Stupid sentimentality', or 'Don't interfere in things you don't understand.' Then he withdrew and the evening was over." Henriette von Schirach's father Heinrich Hoffmann was also present, as was Joseph Goebbels, who recorded the incident in his diary.

In Junge's account, the Jews in question were being deported from Vienna, where Baldur von Schirach was Gauleiter. Nerin E. Gun suggests that Henriette may have deliberately distorted Vienna to Amsterdam, because her husband was responsible for deporting Jews from Vienna.

== After the war ==
At the end of the war, Henriette's husband attempted to avoid capture, posing as a writer ("Dr. Richard Falk"). But he soon decided to surrender to the Americans, doing so on 4 June 1945. He was tried and convicted at Nuremberg, being sentenced on 1 October 1946, for crimes against humanity for his deportation of the Viennese Jews. Henriette was delighted when he was not sentenced to death. He served 20 years as a prisoner in Spandau Prison.

Henriette was arrested and interned in a women's camp in Bad Tölz. She was released in spring 1946. She was arrested again later in 1946, and charged by a de-Nazification court. She was classified as "Group 2, politically incriminated persons" on 11 December 1947. On 16 December 1947 she was reclassified as "less-incriminated person" (Minderbelasteter) and fined 200 marks with one year of probation. According to her memoirs, during her imprisonment she was given the daily task of cleaning the prison's toilets using Hitler Youth flags. She recalled being mistreated and held in contempt by the white American guards, and that it was only the black soldiers who were decent to her. Her father, Heinrich Hoffmann, was also arrested and imprisoned. The children were taken in by their grandmother, who beat them. Their experiences are described by Richard von Schirach in his book "My Father's Shadow". Robert von Schirach was later sent to boarding school.

On 20 July 1949, while Baldur von Schirach was in prison, Henriette filed for divorce, because of her romantic involvement with Alfred H. Jacob, former husband of German film director Leni Riefenstahl. The divorce was finalized in October 1950.

She sent Baldur a damning final letter, writing,

"Have you at any time, instead of sitting in your cell studying philosophy, Latin, French, writing poetry, and thinking how to straighten out your position in history, as you call it, actually faced reality and wondered where the next meal was coming for your wife and children?

You isolated yourself from everything and everyone, your head forever in the clouds as it almost always has been from the day of our marriage. As the years went by, I realized more than ever that your idealistic obsessions and dreams were taking you further from me and the children... I was ready to face death with you. Your answer to me was, "I cannot take my life. First I must make my place and my work clear before history." As always, you would not face facts. Had I taken poison, it would have saved me untold suffering in my fight to live and keep my children alive. I have expressed my feeling so many times before to you, but you have always preferred to ignore them as being distasteful. Reality has always been distasteful to you...

I intend to divorce you immediately.

Jacob lost custody of Henriette's children, due to excessive beatings. Custody was transferred to the Bad Tölz welfare department. Richard remained with Henriette and Peter Jacob, and they moved to Munich. Henriette was industrious, starting a film company "Paris Film" with Jacob. However their film projects were not a success, and they lived modestly. She married and later divorced Jacob. Henriette later lived under her maiden name Hoffmann, and also under the names Henriette Richards and Henriette Roberts.

Henriette was also able to buy back artworks that had been confiscated from Baldur von Schirach, from the Bavarian State Painting Collections (Bayerische Staatsgemäldesammlungen), even though some of these had been stolen from Jews. She was assisted by Eberhard Hanfstaengl, director of the collection, who received an official warning. State Commissar for Victims of Racial, Religious and Political Persecution Philipp Auerbach criticised Hanfstaengl for a "particular act of gallantry towards ladies of war criminals". She made use of statements by Jacob, her father and his housekeeper that pictures and furniture were her legitimate property. The Schirachs' home Schloss Aspenstein was confiscated, however Henriette repeatedly forced her way in to make off with items. She was later able to buy it back from the Bavarian government at a low price, immediately reselling it. Henriette's grandson Ferdinand von Schirach financed research into her activities. In 2019 Ferdinand stated, "Ultimately, after 1945, Henriette and parts of my family took on a second guilt and repeated the theft from these families by demanding these works of art."

Billy F. Price, a Texan entrepreneur and collector of Hitler's paintings, worked with the Schirach family to attempt to recover Heinrich Hoffmann's collection of Hitler's watercolours, and Heinrich's entire collection of photographs, which had been confiscated by the US government. The intention was that Price would then buy the paintings from the Schirach family. Henriette continued these efforts after her father's death, and they continued after Henriette's death in the legal case Price v. United States.

In March 1958, there was discussion in the media about the last three Nazi war criminals detained at Spandau (Rudolf Hess, Albert Speer, and Baldur von Schirach), due to the long time for detention and high cost to the international community to imprison war criminals. With financial support from the Daily Mail, Henriette travelled to London to the British Foreign Secretary Selwyn Lloyd in order to request a reduction of the 20-year prison sentence for her ex-husband. She was unsuccessful. She described her former husband as "in no way a criminal, but an idealist, and much too good for politics."

Henriette wrote three books: "The Price of Glory" (1956) (Der Preis der Herrlichkeit); "Anecdotes about Hitler" (1980) (Anekdoten um Hitler); and "Women around Hitler" (1983) (Frauen um Hitler). She described Hitler as a "cozy Austrian", who "wanted to make himself and others a little bit happy." "The Price of Glory" was "much livelier and more fantastical", as well as much more successful, than her husband Baldur's memoirs, published after his release from Spandau. There was a first German edition in 1956, with an English translation, and a revised German edition in 1976, with an added preface.

== Books ==
- Der Preis der Herrlichkeit, 1956, Wiesbaden: Limes Verlag (The Price of Glory. Second edition, Munich: Herbig, 1976, ISBN 3-548-35457-2)
- Anekdoten um Hitler: Geschichten aus einem halben Jahrhundert, 1980, Türmer-Verlag, ISBN 3-87829-061-6 (Anecdotes about Hitler: Stories from half a century)
- Frauen um Hitler, Munich: Herbig, 1983, ISBN 3-7766-0882-X (Women Around Hitler)

== Bibliography ==
- Baldur von Schirach: I Believed in Hitler, Hamburg: Mosaic Press, 1967
- Richard von Schirach : The Shadow of My Father, Munich, Vienna: Hanser, 2005, ISBN 3-446-20669-8
