= Colin Ross =

Colin Ross may refer to:

- Colin Ross (writer) (1885–1945), German writer and filmmaker
- Colin Ross (composer) (1911–1993), British organist, composer, and musician
- Colin Ross (footballer) (born 1962), Scottish football midfielder
- Colin Ross (pipemaker) (1934–2019), English folk musician and maker of Northumbrian and Scottish smallpipes
- Colin Campbell Ross (1892–1922), Australian man hanged for murder but pardoned 86 years later
- Colin A. Ross (born 1950), American psychiatrist; clinician, researcher and author in the field of trauma related disorders
