= Hartmann Lauterbacher =

German Nazi official (1909–1988)

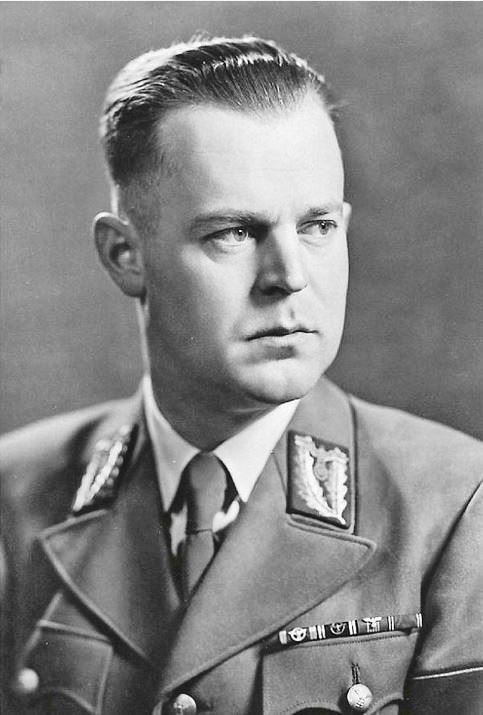
- Lauterbacher in 1940

Oberpräsident of the Province of Hanover
- In office 1 April 1941 – 8 May 1945
- Preceded by: Viktor Lutze
- Succeeded by: Office abolished

Gauleiter of Southern Hanover-Brunswick
- In office 8 December 1940 – 8 May 1945
- Preceded by: Bernhard Rust
- Succeeded by: Office abolished

Deputy Gauleiter of Gau Southern Hanover-Brunswick
- In office 8 August 1940 – 8 December 1940
- Preceded by: Kurt Schmalz
- Succeeded by: August Knop

Deputy Reichsjugendführer and Stabsführer of the Hitler Youth
- In office 18 May 1934 – 8 August 1940
- Leader: Baldur von Schirach
- Preceded by: Karl Nabersberg
- Succeeded by: Helmut Möckel

Personal details
- Born: 24 May 1909 Reutte, Tyrol, Austria-Hungary
- Died: 12 April 1988 (aged 78) Seeon-Seebruck, Free State of Bavaria, West Germany
- Citizenship: Austrian, German
- Party: Nazi Party
- Occupation: Drogist; Intelligence agent (Gehlen Organization, Federal Intelligence Service, 1950–1963)
- Known for: Aktion Lauterbacher
- Civilian awards: Golden Party Badge; Golden Hitler Youth Badge with Oakleaves

Military service
- Allegiance: Nazi Germany
- Branch/service: Waffen-SS; Allgemeine SS
- Years of service: 1940–1945
- Rank: SS-Oberscharführer; SS-Obergruppenführer
- Unit: SS-Leibstandarte Adolf Hitler
- Battles/wars: World War II
- Military awards: War Merit Cross, 1st and 2nd class, with Swords

Hartmann Paul Johann Lauterbacher (24 May 1909 – 12 April 1988) was the German Stabsführer of the Hitler Youth (Hitler Jugend), the Gauleiter of Gau Southern Hanover-Brunswick (Südhannover-Braunschweig), the Oberpräsident of the Province of Hanover and an Obergruppenführer of both the SS and the SA in Nazi Germany. Tried and acquitted of war crimes after the Second World War, he lived a shadowy existence, was recruited by the West German spy agency and was involved in many underground intelligence operations.

== Early life in Austria ==
Lauterbacher was born the son of a veterinarian in Reutte in the Tyrol when it was part of Austria-Hungary. He attended Volksschule in Reutte and Kufstein and the Kufstein Reform-Gymnasium. From ages 16 to 18, he served an apprenticeship as a druggist in a pharmacy and photo development shop in Kufstein. After passing his state examination in 1928, he was employed by the Chamber of Industry and Commerce in Kufstein until March 1929.

While still in school, he had joined the National Socialist Youth organization of the German National Socialist Workers' Party in 1922. The next year in Kufstein, the then 14-year-old Lauterbacher co-founded the first Ortsgruppe (Local Group) of the Deutschen Jugend (German Youth) in Austria. In that year, he became the Deputy Führer of the entire organization and served in that capacity until moving up to Führer in 1925. He first met Adolf Hitler during a visit to Rosenheim on 19 April 1925. Lauterbacher was a member of the Sturmabteilung (SA) in Kufstein from 1926 to 1927. In April 1927, he joined the Hitler Youth (HJ) as member number 4,709, merging the Deutschen Jugend organization in Austria with it and becoming the HJ-Unterführer (subleader) in the Tyrol. On 13 September 1927, he formally joined the Nazi Party (membership number 86,837). As an Alter Kämpfer, he would later be awarded the Golden Party Badge.

== Move to Germany and Hitler Youth career ==
Lauterbacher moved to Braunschweig in April 1929 and attended the druggist academy there until March 1930. He became a part-time Hitler Youth volunteer employee and, by 13 November 1929, he was HJ-Führer of the Braunschweig Ortsgruppe. By 1 February 1930, he had advanced to HJ-Bezirksführer (Area Leader) and by 21 March he was a full-time Hitler Youth official as the HJ-Gauführer for Gau Southern Hanover-Brunswick with headquarters in Hanover. Lauterbacher demonstrated great energy and organizational ability, establishing 31 HJ units in the Gau and increasing membership from 98 in 1930 to over 4,000 by 1932. On 10 April 1932, he was promoted to HJ-Gebeitsführer (Regional Leader) for Westphalia and the Lower Rhine region. On 26 May 1933, after the Nazi seizure of power, he advanced to Führer of the HJ-Obergebeits-West, overseeing all HJ units in six regions of western Germany, including all the Rhineland, the Palatinate and Hesse-Nassau. On 5 July 1933, he was also made Reichsjugendführer Baldur von Schirach's official representative for all of western Germany. Lauterbacher's final promotion within the HJ came on 18 May 1934 when he was appointed Deputy Reichsjugendführer to Schirach and HJ-Stabsführer (Chief of Staff). In his new position, he served as the HJ representative to the German Olympic Committee for the 1936 Summer Olympics in Berlin. He also accompanied Schirach to important functions such as the 1936 Nuremberg Rally and an official visit to Italy in September 1936. Lauterbacher also became the first recipient of the Golden Hitler Youth Badge.

In addition to his HJ responsibilities, on 29 March 1936, Lauterbacher was elected as a deputy to the Reichstag from electoral constituency 16, South Hanover-Braunschweig, a seat he would retain until the fall of the Nazi regime. In April 1937, he was appointed a Ministerial Councilor (Ministerialrat) and, on 9 November of that year, he rejoined the SA with the rank of SA-Gruppenführer. He was appointed to the staff of its national leadership, and would be promoted to SA-Obergruppenführer on 20 April 1944. In 1939, he helped to establish the Academy for Youth Leadership in Braunschweig, a facility for the training and political indoctrination of HJ leaders.

== Military and SS service ==
While Schirach was on active military service with the Wehrmacht from December 1939, Lauterbacher served as HJ leader in an acting capacity. Lauterbacher himself was conscripted into the Waffen-SS on 26 May 1940 and was assigned to the SS-Leibstandarte Adolf Hitler as an SS-Oberscharführer. While undergoing training in Döberitz, he suffered a severe injury to his right shin with a bone marrow infection and thrombosis that required hospitalization in June at the Hohenlychen Sanatorium, an SS medical facility. Formally discharged from the Waffen-SS as unfit for front line duty, he joined the Allgemeine-SS (SS number 382,406) on 2 August 1940 with the rank of SS-Brigadeführer, and was assigned to the staff of Reichsführer-SS Heinrich Himmler. He would subsequently receive promotions to SS-Gruppenführer (20 April 1941) and SS-Obergruppenführer (30 January 1944).

== Gauleiter of Southern Hanover-Brunswick ==
After discharge from the hospital in June 1940, Lauterbacher reported to the branch office of the Party Deputy Führer Rudolf Hess in Vienna for training as a deputy Gauleiter. On 8 August 1940, he left the HJ and was posted as the Deputy Gauleiter for Gau Southern Hanover-Brunswick, under Gauleiter Bernhard Rust and, on 15 November, he was appointed the Gau Housing Commissioner. After the 57-year-old Rust stepped down as Gauleiter, Lauterbacher succeeded him on 8 December 1940. Along with this position came membership on the Defense Committee for Wehrkreis (military district) XI, as well as the honorary leadership of the Academy for Youth Leadership. Lauterbacher, as a youthful and energetic 31-year-old HJ veteran, was considered an ideal prototype for the new breed of Gauleiter. In addition, he was a fanatic opponent of the churches and an avid proponent of the Party's dominant role in national affairs. Finally, he was a particular favorite of Martin Bormann, then the chief-of-staff in Hess' office.

On 1 January 1941, Prussian Minister-president Hermann Göring appointed Lauterbacher to the Prussian State Council. This was followed on 1 April 1941 by appointment as Oberpräsident of the Prussian Province of Hanover, succeeding SA Stabschef Viktor Lutze. As Gauleiter and Oberpräsident, Lauterbacher thus united under his control the highest party and governmental offices in the province. Lauterbacher was appointed the representative of the General Plenipotentiary for Labor Deployment (Fritz Sauckel) for his Gau on 6 April 1942, and the Gau Reich Defense Commissioner on 16 November 1942. In November 1943, he was named the Reich Inspector for Air Raid Protection Measures. This post resulted from his effective efforts in defending against Allied air raids in Hanover. On 25 September 1944, as the Defense Commissioner, he was given the command of the Volkssturm forces in his Gau, and he presided over their swearing-in ceremony in Hanover on 17 November. On 4 December, he was severely wounded in an air raid on a hydroelectric plant at Magdeburg, ironically while traveling to the Reich Ministry of Propaganda in Berlin to discuss air raid protection measures. This again necessitated his hospitalization at the Hohenlychen Sanatorium where he underwent surgery by Dr. Karl Gebhardt on 3 January 1945. He was then transferred to the hospital in Einbeck in February for recuperation.

=== Holocaust involvement ===
In March 1941, Lauterbacher issued orders to the district Regierungspräsident, the Hanover Oberbürgermeister and the local Gestapo to begin planning for the vacating of Jewish homes and apartments within the city. The Jews were to be gathered together in Judenhäuser (Jewish houses), a form of ghettoization. On 3 September 1941, in an operation that came to be known as Aktion Lauterbacher, Hanover's 1,600 Jewish residents were ordered to leave their houses and apartments with only 24-hours notice. They were to take with them only the barest essentials and were to be relocated in 16 Judenhäuser in cramped and unsanitary conditions. Artistic and cultural articles of value were sent to the Kestner-Museum. Their remaining property was seized and auctioned off. Between 13 and 15 December 1941, the synagogue in Braunschweig was torn down. On 15 December, the first Jews from Hanover were deported to the Riga Ghetto and eventually on to the death camps. In March and July 1942, additional deportations reduced the Jewish population to around 300. It is estimated that at least 2,200 Jews from Hanover died in the Holocaust and only around 100 survived the war in the city.

=== Flight and capture ===
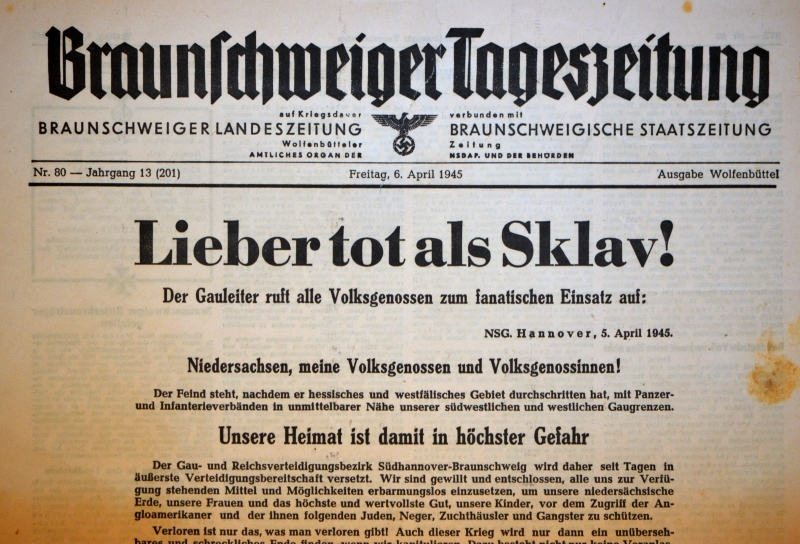
Headline of the Braunschweiger Tageszeitung of 6 April 1945 with an article by Gauleiter Lauterbacher entitled: "Better Dead than a Slave"

The U.S. Army entered Hanover on 10 April 1945. Shortly before the arrival of the Americans, and only 20 days before Adolf Hitler killed himself, Lauterbacher drove his family to safety in the Harz, but not before having announced over the radio the requisite exhortations for the public to hold out against the onslaught. He also issued a proclamation in the Braunschweig newspaper on 6 April threatening death to anyone who "cowardly and traitorously … hoists the white flag and surrenders without a fight". Meanwhile, he had loaded up his car with cigarettes in order to flee south from the Harz posing as a cigarette sales agent. Leaving his family in the Harz on 11 April, he traveled to the military hospital at Bad Gastein, leaving there on 4 May and crossing into Austria where he was taken prisoner by the British Army on 26 May in Carinthia.

== Post war life ==
=== Internment, acquittals and escape ===
On 27 May 1946, Lauterbacher appeared as a defense witness for Schirach at the Nuremberg Trials. On 5 July 1946, the High British Military Court in Hanover acquitted Lauterbacher of the charge of having ordered the murder of German and Allied detainees early in April 1945 at the prison in Hamelin. In August 1947, new proceedings against Lauterbacher began at the Dachau trials. At issue this time was an order allegedly given by him in September 1944 for the shooting of twelve American airmen who had been shot down over Goslar. In October 1947, this trial, too, ended in an acquittal. He was then charged in December 1947 by the German court in Hanover in connection with his role in establishing the Jewish houses. Lauterbacher, who since the end of the war had been interned in the Sandbostel camp near Bremervörde, on 25 February 1948 managed to flee detention in circumstances that are still unclear. The German charges were dismissed in 1949.

=== Reappearance, intelligence activities and last years ===
Based on American intelligence documents, Lauterbacher is alleged to have made connections with the Counterintelligence Corps of the US Army, collaborating with it to establish an international anti-Communist organization in Hungary. While in hiding in Rome he associated with neo-fascist circles and used the aliases Giovanni Bauer and Walter Deterding. He was also reportedly in contact with the Italian intelligence agency. He was commissioned to assist in the organization of the so-called "ratlines", escape routes that Nazi war criminals like Adolf Eichmann, Joseph Mengele, Klaus Barbie and many others utilized in escaping to South America or Middle Eastern states with the help of human smugglers. Lauterbacher was identified and attacked by the Italian Communist Party newspaper l'Unità in April 1950 as a former Nazi leader being assisted by the Church. As a result, he was arrested by Italian authorities that month and was interned in the Campo di internamento di Fraschette near Rome. The Italian government declared him an undesirable alien and sought to deport him. However, he purportedly escaped and fled to Argentina in December 1950.

For many years, Lauterbacher's activities were shrouded in mystery and many conflicting narratives were developed. However, on 14 December 2014, Spiegel online published a story revealing that Lauterbacher had been an operative of the intelligence services of West Germany for thirteen years. The information was based on his personnel file that they obtained from the agency. This revealed that his escape to Argentina was a hoax perpetrated by the Gehlen Organization in 1951 to conceal the fact that they had already recruited him to their permanent staff in 1950. Working under the code name "Leonhard", one of Lauterbacher's tasks was infiltrating the East German youth organization, the Free German Youth, with the aid of other former Hitler Youth officials. He lived in Munich and West Berlin, posing as a foreign trade representative for a Munich-based company owned by his brother Hans. Three years later, he was provided with new identity papers based in Schleswig-Holstein. From 1951 to 1953, he was also active in a Neo-Nazi organization headed by Werner Naumann known as the Naumann Circle, or the Gauleiter Circle, that attempted to infiltrate political parties in West Germany.

Lauterbacher was retained as an operative of the Gehlen Organization's successor, the Bundesnachrichtendienst (BND) when it was formed in 1956. While still posing as a businessman, he coordinated espionage activities in various countries in North Africa and the Middle East, and rose to become a department head. His collaboration with the BND came to an end in 1963, with a last monthly payment of 1,280 Deutsche Marks plus a 960-Mark bonus, and he later received a comfortable pension. Following his separation from the BND in 1963, Lauterbacher worked for authoritarian regimes in Africa and the Middle East. He was employed as a personal advisor to Kwame Nkrumah, the president of Ghana, from 1963 until 1981. From 1977 to 1979, he also was an advisor to Qaboos bin Said, the Sultan of Oman, as a representative for youth questions in the Omani Ministry of Youth. He also is known to have had involvement with the government of the Kingdom of Morocco.

Lauterbacher returned to Germany in 1983 and spent the rest of his life as a recluse but published his memoirs in 1984. He died in April 1988 at Seeon-Seebruck, near the border with his native Austria, without ever having been held accountable for his crimes during the Nazi dictatorship.

== Published works ==
- Baldur von Schirach (1935)
- Erlebt und mitgestaltet (1984)

== See also ==
- History of the Jews in Hannover
- Hitler Youth

== Sources ==
- Höffkes, Karl (1986). Hitlers Politische Generale. Die Gauleiter des Dritten Reiches: ein biographisches Nachschlagewerk. Tübingen: Grabert-Verlag. ISBN 3-87847-163-7.
- Klee, Ernst (2007). Das Personenlexikon zum Dritten Reich. Wer war was vor und nach 1945. Frankfurt-am-Main: Fischer-Taschenbuch-Verlag. ISBN 978-3-596-16048-8.
- Lilla, Joachim (2005). Der Preußische Staatsrat 1921–1933: Ein biographisches Handbuch. Düsseldorf: Droste Verlag. ISBN 978-3-770-05271-4.
- Miller, Michael D.; Schulz, Andreas (2017). Gauleiter: The Regional Leaders of the Nazi Party and Their Deputies, 1925-1945, Volume II (Georg Joel - Dr. Bernhard Rust). R. James Bender Publishing. ISBN 978-1-932970-32-6.
- Orlow, Dietrich (1973). The History of the Nazi Party: 1933–1945. University of Pittsburgh Press. ISBN 0-822-9-3253-9.
- Williams, Max (2017). SS Elite: The Senior Leaders of Hitler's Praetorian Guard. Vol. 2. Fonthill Media LLC. ISBN 978-1-781-55434-0.
