= Karl Nabersberg =

German youth leader and politician (1908–1946)

Stabsführer of the Hitler Youth
- Preceded by: New office
- Succeeded by: Hartmann Lauterbacher

Personal details
- Born: 11 July 1908 Crefeld, Rhine Province, Germany
- Died: 15 January 1946 (aged 37) Dachau, Upper Bavaria, Germany
- Party: National Socialist German Workers' Party (NSDAP)
- Profession: Youth leader

Karl Nabersberg (sometimes written as Carl Nabersberg, 11 July 1908 – 15 January 1946) was a German youth leader.

Nabersberg was the son of a Crefeld shopkeeper. In 1923 he joined the Jugendorganisation, the forerunner of the Hitler Youth, in his home town. On 28 December 1925 he was admitted as a member of the National Socialist German Workers' Party (member number 26269) and as a member of the Sturmabteilung. After school, he studied law at the University of Cologne and Humboldt University of Berlin, although he never graduated. He participated in the founding of the Cologne local NSDAP and served from 1928 to 1929 as a high-school group leader of the National Socialist German Students' League as well as a group leader of the General Student Committee at Humboldt University.

From November 1931 to June 1934 was Stabsführer of the Hitler Youth and deputy to Reichsjugendführer Baldur von Schirach. In July 1933, Schirach dissolved the Reich Committee of German Youth Associations which represented 135 different youth groups. Nabersberg led a raid on the Berlin headquarters of the Committee, with a handful of Sturmabteilung men and 50 armed teenagers from the Hitler Youth. (The figure of 50 armed teenagers comes from Baldur von Schirach's 1933 book Die Hitler – Jugend and may be exaggerated. A postwar account by Helene Gehse, one of five staff at the headquarters, reported a very small number of Hitler Youth, one of whom was armed with an old carbine.) During the raid, Hermann Maaß was summoned and threatened by Nabersberg before being told to leave the building. Schirach named Nabersberg as one of the "Pioneers of the Third Reich" in his 1933 book.

From July 1934 he became head of the Border and International Relations Office of the Hitler Youth, promoting ethnic politics amongst Germanic youth in neighbouring countries. In January 1935 he resigned this position for health reasons and assumed the duties of an Obergebietsführer of the Hitler Youth. In November 1937 he met Lord Baden-Powell with a view to forging closer ties between the Hitler Youth and The Scout Association.

After the war, the West Berlin Denazification Tribunal fined Nabersberg 6,000 Reichsmarks. He died in 1946.
