= Urfeld am Walchensee =

Village in Bad Tölz-Wolfratshauen, Bavaria

Coordinates: 47.6174°N 11.3454°E

Urfeld am Walchensee is a village in the municipality of Kochel am See in the district of Bad Tölz-Wolfratshausen in Bavaria, Germany. It lies on the northwest shore of Lake Walchensee.

== Famous people in Urfeld ==
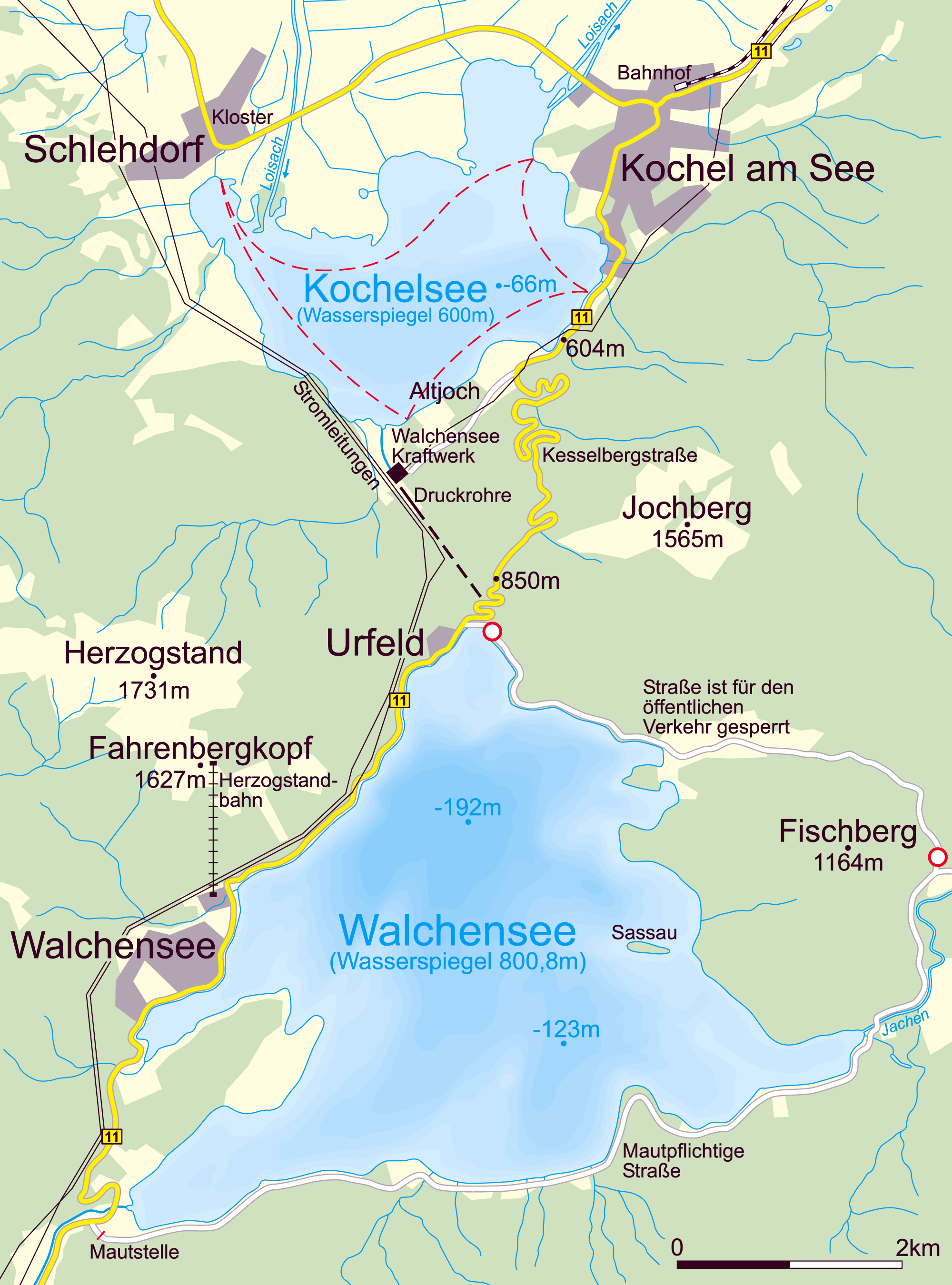
Urfeld am Walchensee

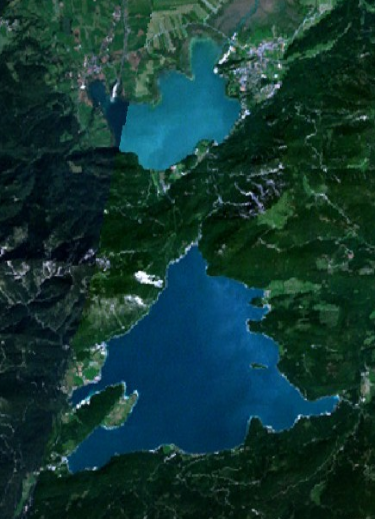
Lakes Walchensee and Kochelsee
(NASA satellite image)

(Source:)

- ^{†} Johann Wolfgang von Goethe — September 1786
- Ferdinand Graf von Spork — in the period 1875–1902
- Hans Freiherr von Wolzogen — in the period 1883–1898
- Hermann Rietschel — in the period 1886–1914
- Berthold Kellermann — 1884
- Georg von Vollmar — in the period 1889–1922
- Wolfgang Heine — in the period 1905–1944
- Otto Borngräber — in the period 1905–1928
- Franz Seraph von Pfistermeister — in the period 1909–1912
- Peter Emil Recher — in the period 1913–1948
- Lovis Corinth — in the period 1918–1925
- Paul Kalbeck — 1920
- Arnold Zweig — in August 1923
- Werner Heisenberg — in the period 1939–1976
- ^{‡} Colin Ross — April 1945
- ^{‡ ‡} Baldur von Schirach and Henriette von Schirach — in the period 1939–1945
- Günther Lüders — in the period 1954–1975

== Notes ==
- † Goethe went incognito in Urfeld as "Johann Philipp Möller from Leipzig" at the beginning of his first trip to Italy on September 7, 1786.
- ‡ Committed suicide with his wife Elizabeth on 29 April 1945 in the house of Baldur von Schirach.
- ‡ ‡ Schirach and Ross were administrators of the Hitler Youth otherwise known as the Hitlerjugend.
