= Ariadne von Schirach =

German philosopher, writer, journalist and critic (born 1978)

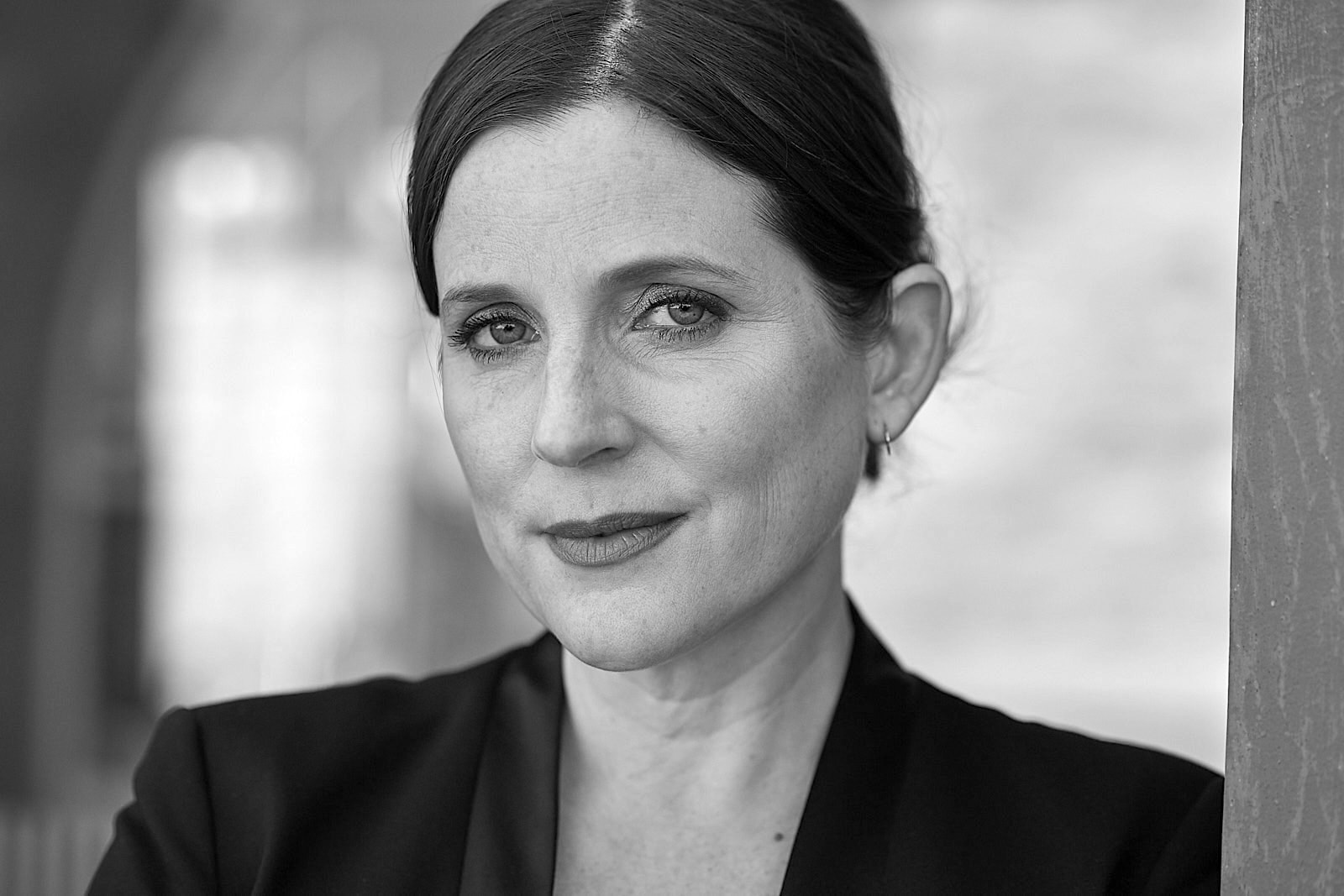
- Von Schirach in 2018
- Born: July 24, 1978 (age 47); Munich, West Germany
- Occupations: Philosopher and critic

Ariadne von Schirach (born July 24, 1978) is a German philosopher, writer, journalist and critic. She is known as a literary critic for Deutschlandradio Kultur, and as an essayist and columnist for newspapers such as Die Welt and Frankfurter Allgemeine Zeitung.

She studied philosophy, psychology and sociology at LMU Munich, the Free University of Berlin and the Humboldt University of Berlin. She teaches philosophy and Chinese thinking at the Berlin University of the Arts, the Hochschule für bildende Künste Hamburg and the University for Continuing Education Krems since 2012. In 2007, she published the book Der Tanz um die Lust, about the consequences of an increasingly sexualized society, which became a bestseller. In 2014, she published her second book, Du sollst nicht funktionieren: Für eine neue Lebenskunst. In 2016, she published the psychoanalytical textbook Ich und du und Müllers Kuh. Kleine Charakterkunde für alle, die sich selbst und andere besser verstehen wollen. After Der Tanz um die Lust, 2007 and Du sollst nicht funktionieren. Für eine neue Lebenskunst, 2014 she published 2019 Die psychotische Gesellschaft. Wie wir Angst und Ohnmacht überwinden, the final book of this Trilogy of Modern Life.

Schirach is a member of the Sorbian Schirach family and is a daughter of the sinologist Richard von Schirach and a granddaughter of the Nazi youth leader and war criminal Baldur von Schirach. She is a cousin of the lawyer and bestselling crime writer Ferdinand von Schirach and the sister of the novelist Benedict Wells.

== Books ==
- Der Tanz um die Lust, Goldmann, Munich, 2007, ISBN 978-3-442-31115-6
- Du sollst nicht funktionieren: Für eine neue Lebenskunst, Klett-Cotta, Stuttgart, 2014, ISBN 978-3-608-50313-5
- Ich und du und Müllers Kuh. Kleine Charakterkunde für alle, die sich selbst und andere besser verstehen wollen, Klett-Cotta, Stuttgart, 2016, ISBN 978-3-608-96124-9
- Die psychotische Gesellschaft. Wie wir Angst und Ohnmacht überwinden, Tropen Verlag, Stuttgart, 2019, ISBN 978-3-608-50233-6
