= Georg von Vollmar =

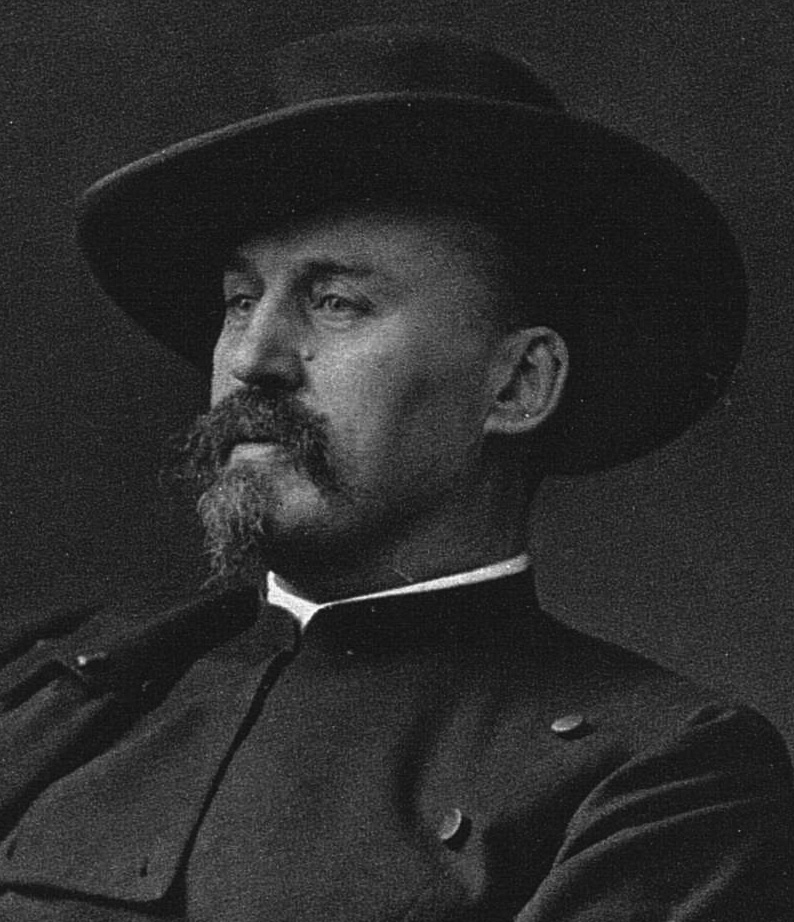
- Vollmar in 1900.
- Born: Georg Carl Joseph Heinrich Ritter von Vollmar auf Veltheim; 7 March 1850; Munich, Kingdom of Bavaria, German Confederation
- Died: 30 June 1922 (aged 72); Urfeld am Walchensee, country seat of Soiensaß, Upper Bavaria, Germany
- Political party: Social Democratic Party of Germany

Georg Heinrich Ritter (Chevalier) von Vollmar auf Veldheim (March 7, 1850 – June 30, 1922) was a democratic socialist politician from Bavaria.

== Biography ==
Vollmar was born in Munich, and educated in a school attached to a Benedictine monastery at Augsburg In 1865 entered the Bavarian army as a lieutenant in a cavalry regiment. He served in the campaign of 1866, and then entered the Papal Guard as a volunteer. In 1869 he returned to Germany, and during the Franco-Prussian War served in the army railway department. He was severely wounded at Blois and pensioned.

Permanently crippled by his wounds, Vollmar devoted himself to political and social studies. In 1872, he was converted to the principles of social democracy, and involved himself with great energy into political agitation. In 1877, he became editor of the party organ at Dresden, and under the Anti-Socialist Laws was repeatedly condemned to various terms of imprisonment, and was also expelled from that city.

From 1879 to 1882 Vollmar lived at Zürich, then the headquarters of social democracy, when, besides attending the University of Zurich, he took part in editing the Social Demokrat. In 1881 he was elected member of the Reichstag, serving until 1887, and then again from 1890 to 1918. From 1883 to 1889 was a member of the Saxon diet (German: Sächsischer Landtag). After 1885, he resided in Bavaria, and it was to him that the great success of the socialists in the older Bavarian provinces was chiefly due.

Vollmar identified himself with the more moderate and opportunist section of the Socialist party, decisively dissociating himself from the doctrine of a sudden and violent overthrow of society, and urging his associates to co-operate in bringing about a gradual development towards the socialistic state. In an article 'On State Socialism' in Die Neue Zeit he argued for an alliance with bourgeois 'State Socialism' reformers, which was vigorously responded to by Karl Kautsky, the editor of that periodical.

He showed himself ready to make concessions to the principle of private ownership in the case of the small landowners, or peasants. He refused to identify social democracy with the views as to religion and the family advocated by August Bebel, and successfully resisted attempts made in 1891 to expel him from the party in consequence of his opinions. He became a member of the Bavarian diet (German: Bayerischer Landtag) in 1893.

Vollmar died at the country seat of Soiensaß in the settlement of Urfeld am Walchensee in 1922.

== Works ==
In addition to a couple of books on the preservation of forests, he wrote:

- The Isolated Socialist State (German: Der isolierte soziale Staat; Zürich, 1880)
- On the next tasks of Social Democracy (German: Ueber die nächsten Aufgaben der Socialdemokratie; 1891)
- On state socialism (German: Ueber Staatssocialismus; 1892)
