= Academy for Youth Leadership =

Hitler Youth training school

Coordinates: 52.242481°N 10.526881°E

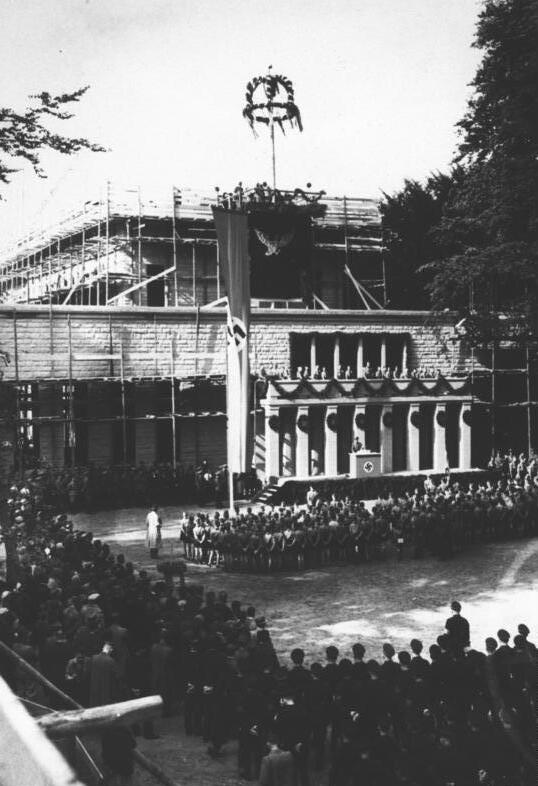
The Academy for Youth Leadership in Braunschweig, as seen in 1938. From the German Federal Archives.

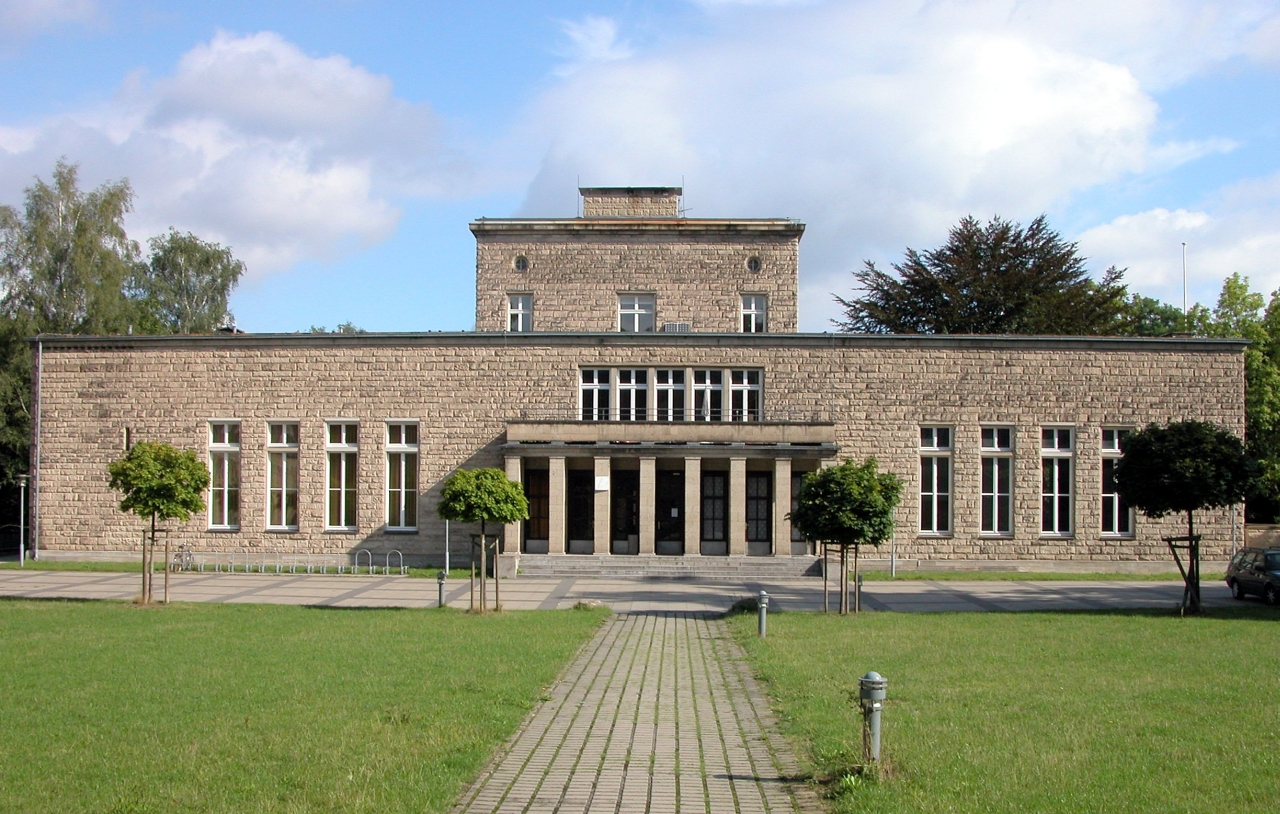
The former “Akademie für Jugendführung”, built 1937 to 1939, in Braunschweig, as seen from the south.

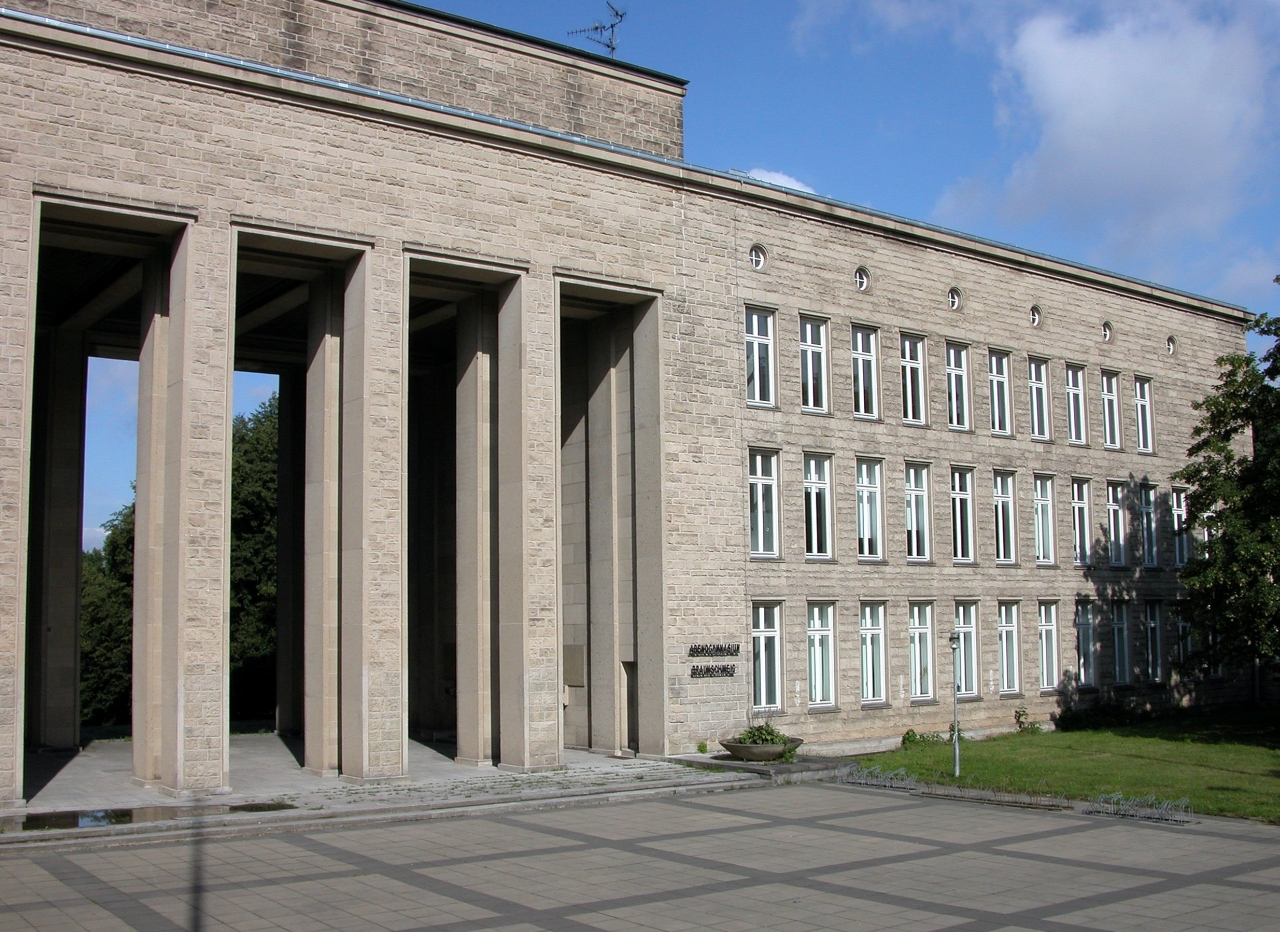
The building viewed from the southeast. To the left is the "Ehrenhalle", or Hall of Honor, with its 12 meter high columns.

The Academy for Youth Leadership (German: Akademie für Jugendführung), a school in Braunschweig for Hitler Youth (HJ) leaders, was the highest Nazi training-facility for the training of full-time junior executives for the Hitler Youth movement in the Third Reich. Its premises were built between 1937 and 1939. Since 2001 the Braunschweig College for Adult Education and the Abendgymnasium Braunschweig have been housed in this building.

Any "Hitler Youth who [was] above reproach in terms of descent, health, performance, and behavior" was eligible for the one-year academy course if he had completed his labor- and military-service and had already taken some leadership courses. Successful completion of the Academy course obligated the graduate to twelve years of HJ service. The Academy had little effect because World War II began soon after its founding.

== Conception and history ==
The decision to build the Academy for Youth Leadership was based on the desire of the Nazi leaders to fill the senior leadership of Hitler Youth with a trained leadership corps of professional youth leaders between the ages of 23 and 35, to institutionalize the recruitment of young talent and to develop a career in the Hitler Youth into one's full career. Therefore, the academy was at the head of the HJ training system, which consisted in part of Reichsführer schools, Reichsführer camps, and leadership preparation 'factories' (Führerschulungswerke - discussion and study groups designed to improve HJ leaders' abilities) in the years after the so-called seizure of power.

The training order for the Führer Corps was issued on 18 February 1938. The one-year training at the academy was intended to cover all youth leadership responsibilities. In addition to sports and fitness, it encompassed knowledge regarding political, economic, and cultural life in addition to the natural sciences, though exclusively in propagandistic and educational use in service of the Nazi ideology such as biology as genetics and racial hygiene and history from Nazi leadership's point of view. To give graduates an appropriately international appearance, foreign languages and dance classes were also included in the curriculum.

Applicants had to document their Aryan descent with an Ariernachweis (certification of Aryan descent) and have either passed the Abitur (exam to graduate high school) or have completed vocational training. After the year at the academy, three weeks had to be spent working in industry and six months spent abroad before registering for the final exam. If it was successfully passed. the pupil would be given the Youth Leader's License (Jügendführer-Patent) with a leader's dagger (Führerdolch) and become a Bannführer (battalion leader) in the Hitler Youth.

However, this concept was never fully realized. The first course began on 20 April 1939 in Potsdam before being moved to Braunschweig. Less than four weeks after the academy was opened on 2 August 1939, with the first class of 87 pupils, the Second World War began with the German invasion of Poland. Almost all students and teachers were given draft orders, and the academy program quickly came to a halt.

Between 1940 and 1942, the vacant rooms were used by the Bund Deutscher Mädel (BDM - League of German Girls), first for courses offered by the BDM Faith and Beauty Society, and later for those of the BDM junior leaders.

In 1942, the Wehrmacht (Nazi military) seized the buildings to be used as a military hospital. After youth leader Baldur von Schirach expressed an urgent desire for the Academy's release, provisional five-month courses occurred in November 1942. The students were now former HJ leaders that were disabled in the war. The teaching operation lasted until 12 April 1945 when troops of the 30th Infantry Division Marched into the city.

=== Commanders ===
- Kurt Petter, 16 August 1938 until the beginning of the war
- Ernst Schlünden, immediately after the beginning of the war until 1 July 1942
- Kurt Budäus, 1 July 1942 until 10 October 1944

== See also ==
- Hitler Youth
- League of German Girls
- Nazi Party

== Bibliography ==
- Christian Zentner, Friedemann Bedürftig (1991). The Encyclopedia of the Third Reich. Macmillan, New York. ISBN 0-02-897502-2
- A. Ponzio, Shaping the New Man. Youth Training Regimes in Fascist Italy and Nazi Germany, Madison, University of Wisconsin Press, 2015.
