= Gau Southern Hanover-Brunswick =

Gau Southern Hanover–Brunswick
- Gau of Nazi Germany
- 1928–1945
- Flag Coat of arms

- Capital: Hannover
- Government
- Gauleiter
  - 1928–1940: Bernhard Rust
  - 1940–1945: Hartmann Lauterbacher
- History
  - Establishment: 1 October 1928
  - Disestablishment: 8 May 1945
Preceded by	Succeeded by
Free State of Prussia (1933-1935); Free State of Brunswick	Lower Saxony; Saxony-Anhalt (1945-1952)
- Today part of: Germany

Gau Southern Hanover–Brunswick (German: Gau Südhannover–Braunschweig) was a de facto administrative division of Nazi Germany from 1933 to 1945 in the Free State of Brunswick and part of the Free State of Prussia. Before that, from its formation on 1 October 1928 to 1933, it was the regional subdivision of the Nazi Party in that area. Gau Southern Hanover-Brunswick was abolished after Germany's defeat in 1945. The territory after the war became part of Lower Saxony in West Germany.

== History ==
The Nazi Gau (plural Gaue) system was originally established in a party conference on 22 May 1926, in order to improve administration of the party structure. From 1933 onward, after the Nazi seizure of power, the Gaue increasingly replaced the German states as administrative subdivisions in Germany.

At the head of each Gau stood a Gauleiter, a position which became increasingly more powerful, especially after the outbreak of the Second World War, with little interference from above. Local Gauleiters often held government positions as well as party ones and were in charge of, among other things, propaganda and surveillance and, from September 1944 onward, the Volkssturm and the defense of the Gau.

The position of Gauleiter in Southern Hanover-Brunswick was initially held by Bernhard Rust from October 1928 until November 1940 and then by Hartmann Lauterbacher until the end of the war.
