= Richard von Schirach =

German sinologist and author (1942–2023)

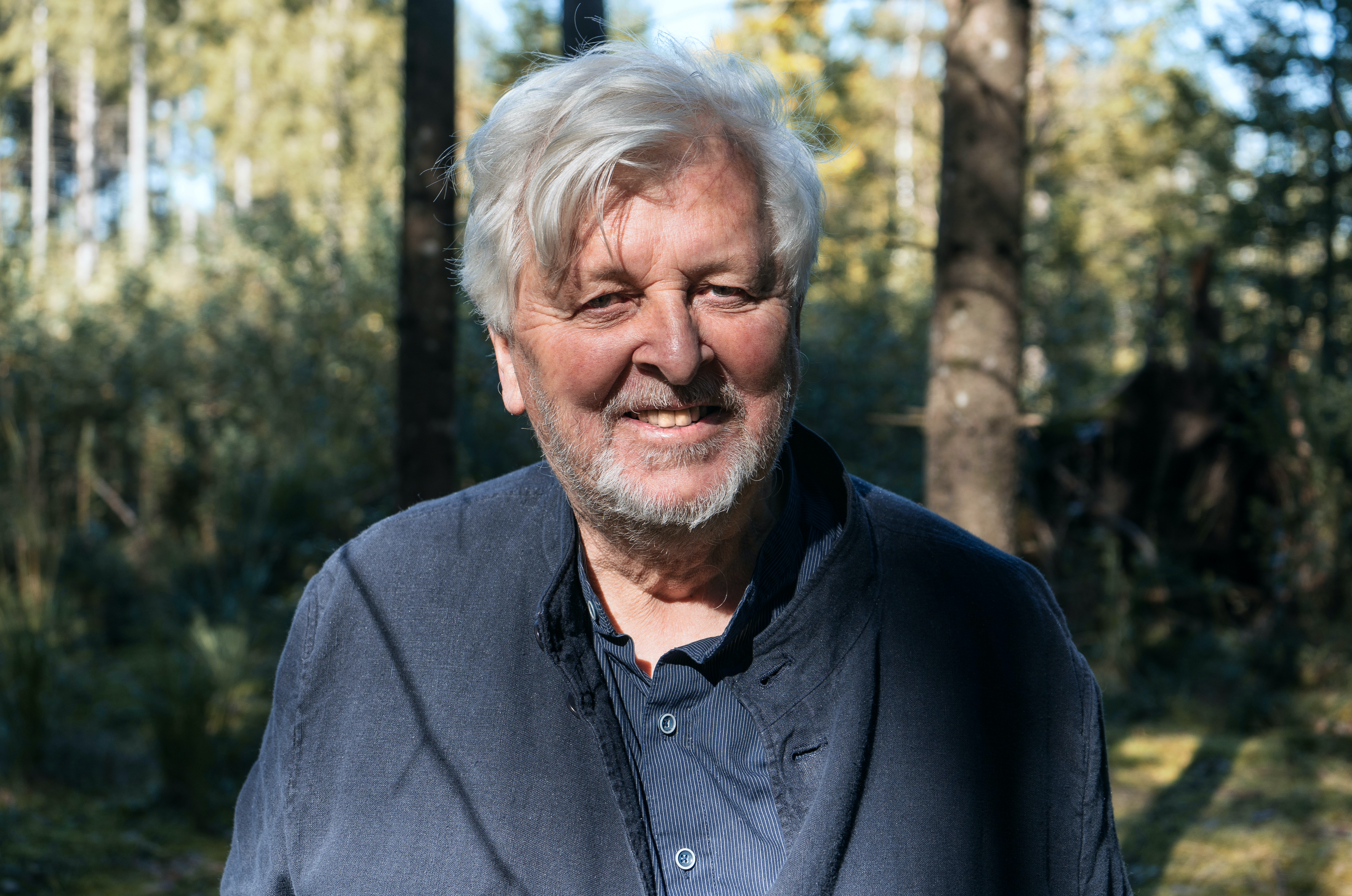
Von Schirach in 2020

Richard von Schirach (11 February 1942 – 11 July 2023) was a German sinologist and author.

== Biography ==
Richard von Schirach was born in Munich on 11 February 1942. He studied at LMU Munich, where he earned a doctorate in Chinese literature in 1974. In 1973, he published a German version of the autobiography of Chinese Emperor Puyi. Richard von Schirach was a member of the noble Sorbian Schirach family. He was a son of the Nazi war criminal Baldur von Schirach, and a grandson of Adolf Hitler's official photographer Heinrich Hoffmann. He published a book about his father. He was the father of philosopher Ariadne von Schirach and author Benedict Wells.

After returning to Germany after living and working for many years on Taiwan, von Schirach settled in Kochel am See. He died in a hospital in nearby Garmisch-Partenkirchen on 11 July 2023, at the age of 81.

== Books ==
- Pu Yi: Ich war Kaiser von China: Vom Himmelssohn zum neuen Menschen. Hanser, Munich 1973.
- Hsü Chih-mo und die Hsin-yüeh-Gesellschaft: Ein Beitrag zur Neuen Literatur Chinas. Dissertation, Ludwig-Maximilians-Universität München, 1974.
- Der Schatten meines Vaters ("My Father's Shadow"). Hanser, Munich, Vienna 2005, ISBN 3-446-20669-8
- Die Nacht der Physiker: Heisenberg, Hahn, Weizsäcker und die deutsche Bombe.

== Literature ==
- Norbert Lebert, Stephan Lebert: Denn Du trägst meinen Namen. Das schwere Erbe der prominenten Nazi-Kinder. Blessing, Munich 2000, ISBN 3-89667-105-7.
