= Baldur von Schirach =

German Nazi politician (1907–1974)

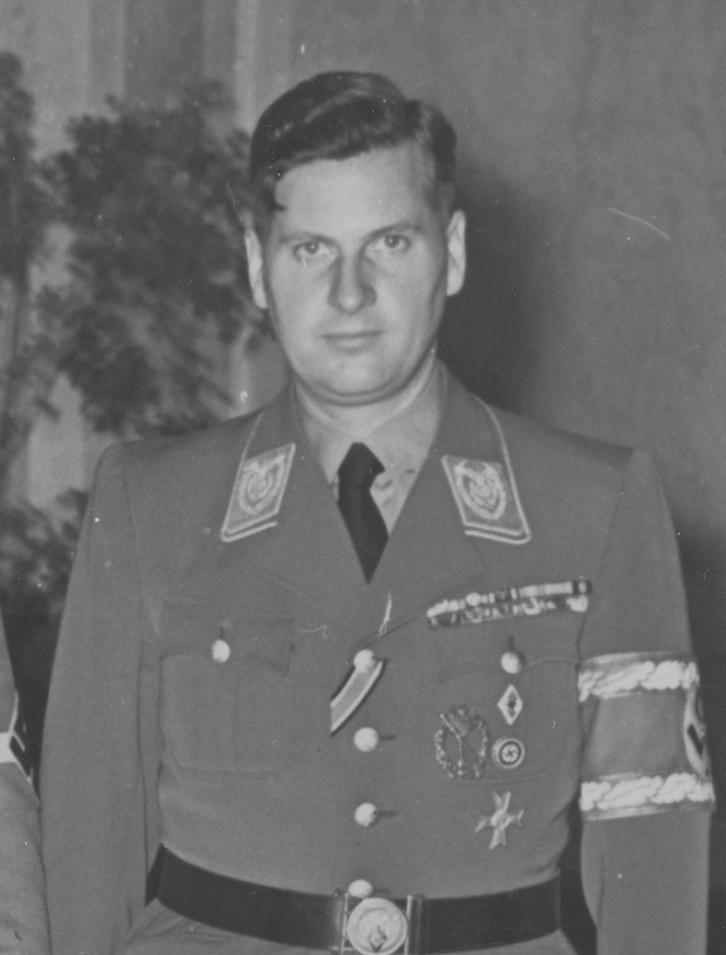
- Schirach as Reichsstatthalter, 1942

Reich Youth Leader of the Nazi Party
- In office 30 October 1931 – 8 August 1940
- Deputy: Karl Nabersberg; Hartmann Lauterbacher; Artur Axmann
- Preceded by: Office established
- Succeeded by: Artur Axmann

Reichsstatthalter of Reichsgau Vienna
- In office 8 August 1940 – 8 May 1945
- Leader: Adolf Hitler
- Preceded by: Josef Bürckel
- Succeeded by: Office abolished

Gauleiter of Reichsgau Vienna
- In office 8 August 1940 – 8 May 1945
- Preceded by: Josef Bürckel
- Succeeded by: Office abolished

Additional positions
- 1944–1945: Commander of the Volkssturm in Reichsgau Wien
- 1940–1945: Deputy to the Führer for Inspection of the Hitler Youth
- 1933–1945: Reichsleiter for Youth Education of the Nazi Party
- 1933–1945: Member of the Greater German Reichstag
- 1932–1933: Member of the Reichstag

Personal details
- Born: Baldur Benedikt von Schirach; 9 May 1907 Berlin, Germany
- Died: 8 August 1974 (aged 67) Kröv, West Germany
- Party: Nazi Party
- Spouse: Henriette Hoffmann (m. 1932; div. 1949)
- Children: 4, including Richard von Schirach
- Civilian awards: Hitler Youth Golden Honour Badge with Diamonds and Rubies; Golden Party Badge

Military service
- Allegiance: Nazi Germany
- Branch/service: German Army
- Years of service: 1939–1940
- Rank: Leutnant
- Unit: Infantry Regiment Großdeutschland
- Battles/wars: Battle of France
- Military awards: Iron Cross, 2nd class
- Criminal information
- Conviction: Crimes against humanity
- Trial: Nuremberg trials
- Penalty: 20 years imprisonment

Baldur Benedikt von Schirach (German pronunciation: [ˈbaldʊʁ ˈbeːnedɪkt fɔn ˈʃiːʁax]; 9 May 1907 – 8 August 1974) was a German politician who was the leader (Reichsjugendführer) of the Hitler Youth from 1931 to 1940. From 1940 to 1945, he was the Gauleiter (district leader) and Reichsstatthalter (Reich governor) of Vienna.

A member of the Nazi Party from the age of 18, Schirach was named national youth leader of the party in 1931. In 1932, he was elected as a deputy to the Reichstag. After Adolf Hitler became Chancellor of Germany in 1933, he was appointed Jugendführer (Youth Leader) of the German Reich, responsible for all youth organizations in the nation. In 1940, Schirach saw action as an infantryman in the French Campaign, for which he was awarded the Iron Cross, 2nd Class. In 1940, Schirach was appointed Gauleiter of the Reichsgau Vienna; Artur Axmann succeeded him as leader of the Hitler Youth. A virulent antisemite, he was responsible for deporting 65,000 Viennese Jews to various Nazi concentration camps in German-occupied Poland.

In April 1945, facing Red Army advance, Schirach fled from Vienna to Tyrol, where he later surrendered to American forces. At the Nuremberg trials, he was convicted of crimes against humanity and sentenced to 20 years in prison. After completing his sentence at Spandau in 1966, Schirach retired to southern Germany. He died in 1974 at the age of 67.

== Early life and family ==
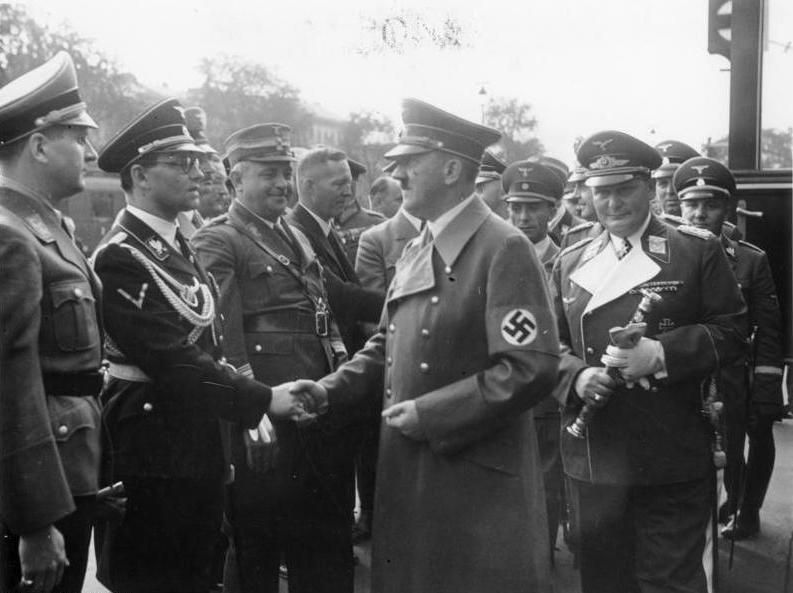
Schirach (far left) watches as Hitler greets his Chancellery chief Philipp Bouhler in Munich 1938.

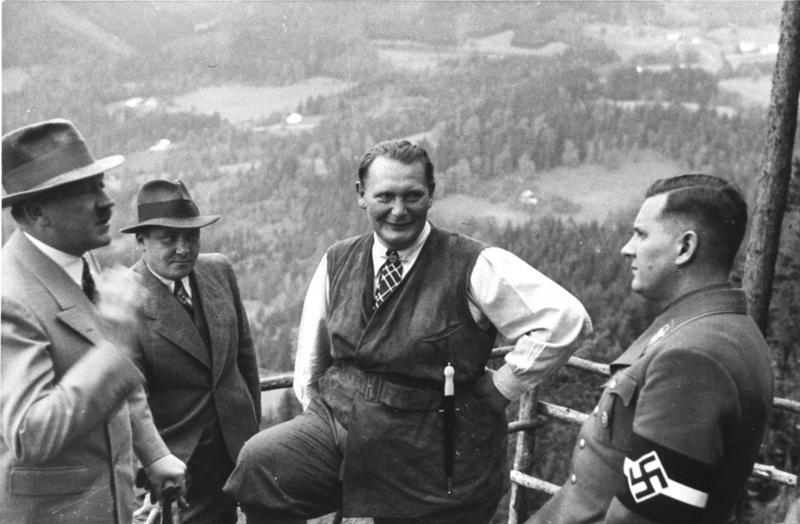
Schirach (right) with Hitler, Bormann and Göring at the Obersalzberg

Schirach was born in Berlin, the youngest of four children of theatre director, grand ducal chamberlain and retired captain of the cavalry Carl Baily Norris von Schirach and his American wife Emma Middleton Lynah Tillou, a descendant of Arthur Middleton, one of the founding fathers of the United States. A member of the noble Schirach family, of Sorbian origins, three of his four grandparents were from the United States, chiefly from Pennsylvania. English was the first language he learned at home and he did not learn to speak German until the age of six. He had two sisters, Viktoria Benedikta and the opera singer Rosalind von Schirach, and a brother, Karl Benedict von Schirach. His brother committed suicide in 1919 at the age of 19.

Schirach was educated at the Wilhelm-Ernst-Gymnasium from 1916 to 1917, followed by the "Forest Pedagogium" boarding school at Bad Berka. This was inspired by a similar school founded by Hermann Lietz. He then returned to Weimar where he attended the Realgymnasium at Museumplatz 3.

On 31 March 1932 Schirach married the 19-year-old Henriette Hoffmann, the daughter of Heinrich Hoffmann, Adolf Hitler's personal photographer and friend. Schirach's family was at first vehemently opposed to this marriage, but Hitler insisted. Otto Strasser dismissively described Schirach as "a young effeminate". Through this relationship, Schirach became part of Hitler's inner circle. The young couple were welcome guests at Hitler's "Berghof" holiday home. Henriette von Schirach gave birth to four children: Angelika Benedikta von Schirach (born 1933), lawyer Klaus von Schirach (born 1935), businessman Robert Benedict Wolf von Schirach (1938–1980) and sinologist Richard von Schirach (1942–2023). Robert had a son, the lawyer and best-selling German crime-fiction writer Ferdinand von Schirach. Richard had children Ariadne von Schirach, philosopher and critic, and Benedict Wells, a novelist.

== Nazi Party career ==
=== Reich youth leader ===
Schirach joined a Wehrjugendgruppe (paramilitary youth group) at the age of seventeen, the youth division of the Preußenbund. He first met Hitler aged seventeen, when Hitler gave a speech in Weimar and Schirach was assigned guard duty. Schirach considered this the strongest speech he ever heard from Hitler, and paid attention to the sound of his voice, "deep and raw, resonant like a cello." Schirach wrote a poem about the encounter, which was published in Hans Severus Ziegler's newspaper Der Nationalsozialist. It was set to music by Gerhard Pallman and published in several songbooks. Schirach later described it as one of his "many bad poems". In October 1924, Hitler again visited Weimar, and visited the home of Schirach's father.

Schirach became a member of the Nazi Party (NSDAP) on 29 August 1925 (membership number 17,251). In 1925, he also joined the Sturmabteilung (SA) in Weimar. He followed Hitler to Munich, to attend university, and also attended the salons of Elsa and Hugo Bruckmann, with whom he lived for a time. In November 1927 Schirach first demonstrated his talents for organisation, packing a room with students for a speech by Hitler. In February 1928 he became a university group leader of the National Socialist German Students' League (Nationalsozialistischer Deutscher Studentenbund; NSDStB), and on 20 July 1928, he became the national leader (Reichsführer). He worked to broaden the Nazi Party's appeal to the bourgeoisie. Schirach was supported by Hitler in internal elections, who also wanted the Nazi Party to have a broad social base. During this period Schirach was twice challenged to a duel, and was given a conditional prison sentence for accepting one of them.

Schirach was skilled at bureaucratic power struggles. He founded the School Children's Leagues (Schülerbünde) to create competition to the Hitler Youth. He made an ally of Joseph Goebbels. In 1929 he defeated Kurt Gruber in an internal election, and later convinced Hitler to sideline Gruber.

In 1929, he was selected as a Reichsredner (national speaker) and was active in Party propaganda activities. In 1931, he was prosecuted for an anti-Versailles demonstration, and used his court appearance to attack the Weimar Republic. He was given a three-month suspended prison sentence. On 30 October 1931, he was named as Reichsjugendführer (National Youth Leader) of the Nazi Party.

On 31 March 1932, Schirach married Henriette Hoffmann. Hitler and Ernst Röhm were witnesses to the marriage, and the reception was held in Hitler's apartment. Henriette's wealthy father, Heinrich Hoffmann, paid for them to move into a luxurious apartment by the Englischer Garten. With Heinrich Hoffmann, Schirach produced several propaganda books of Hoffmann's photographs, including "Hitler As No One Knows Him", "Youth Around Hitler", and "Hitler in His Mountains". Schirach wrote the captions. The books sold hundreds of thousands of copies, earning Schirach and Hoffmann substantial royalties.

In May 1932, Schirach was made Reichsleiter for Youth Education (Reichsleiter für Jügenderziehung). Reichsleiter was the second highest political rank in the Nazi Party.

On 16 June 1932, he was made Reichsführer of the Party's Hitler Youth organization, and resigned from the Student League. Under Schirach, the Hitler Youth stewarded NSDAP events, and 21 members died in 1932. Schirach described these deaths as "blood sacrifice" for propaganda purposes. One example was Herbert Norkus, a fifteen-year-old boy who was stabbed to death by Communists. In a 31 May 1932 speech, Schirach recounted Norkus's death and called for a "National Socialist dictatorship". Schirach gave a memorial speech on the third anniversary of Norkus's death in January 1935.

Schirach became a member of the Reichstag as a representative of the Party electoral list at the 31 July 1932 election. He would continue to serve in that body until the end of the Nazi regime, from November 1933 as a deputy from electoral constituency 7, Breslau, and from March 1936 as a deputy from electoral constituency 6, Pomerania. He moved the Hitler Youth headquarters to Berlin in 1933 to stay close to Hitler. The building was purchased by an anonymous industrialist.

As leader of the Hitler Youth, Schirach helped to build the "Führer myth", using his speeches to communicate an emotional connection to Hitler, with themes of laying down one's life for Hitler. He wrote the lyrics to many songs, including the "song of the Hitler Youth flag", which was used in the film Der Hitlerjunge Quex. Schirach organised a "Reich Youth Day" on 1 October 1932, with between 50,000 and 70,000 adolescents of the Hitler Youth and the League of German Girls attending the Luftschiffhafen Potsdam (Potsdam Airship Port). It was financed by sales of badges and other propaganda materials. The Hitler Youth also published various magazines, and organised leisure excursions including militaristic activities such as flying, reconnaissance, motorised and mounted "units". On 17 May 1938, Schirach said, "The real, great educational act for a people lies in ingraining in youth blind obedience, unshakeable loyalty, unconditional comradeship and absolute reliability."

On 5 April 1933, the offices of the Reich Committee of German Youth Leagues were occupied by a unit of the Hitler Youth. From the records they obtained detailed knowledge of all youth groups including their key figures. In a second surprise raid they took control of the Reich League for German Youth Hostels (Reichsverband fuer deutsche Jugendherbergen). On 10 June 1933, Schirach was named Reichsjugendführer (Youth Leader of the German Reich), with responsibility for all youth organizations in the nation. His permission was required to found youth organisations. Also on that date, he was made a State Secretary in the Reich Interior Ministry. On 23 June 1933, all other youth organisations were retroactively dissolved from 17 June 1933.

Under Schirach, the Hitler Youth was nominally run by self-organising youth, with the motto "youth leads youth". This echoed Goethe's line "Youth educates itself in youth". However, strict ideological boundaries were imposed. Schirach rejected the idea that Goethe was a "prophet of humanity", "above the fatherland and the nation", and linked to "individualistic education". In a speech to students on 5 November 1941, Schirach alluded to individualism, saying "The idea is lonely", but argued "Academic freedom is not a catchword of liberalism. It is an achievement of the German spirit."

Schirach became a member of the Academy for German Law upon its formation in October 1933.

Schirach appeared frequently at rallies, such as the Nuremberg rally of 1934, when he appeared with Hitler in rousing the Hitlerjugend audience. The event was filmed for Triumph of the Will, the propaganda film made by Leni Riefenstahl for the Nazi Party. Schirach set the militaristic tone of the youth organisation, which participated in military-style exercises, as well as practising use of military equipment such as rifles. In July 1940, when a new play by Hans Baumann was staged at Veste Oberhaus in Passau, Schirach insisted that 2,000 local Hitler Youth members be part of that

In 1936, the Hitler Youth was declared the only legal youth organisation. At this point it had approximately six million members. Membership became compulsory in March 1939, with almost eight million members aged 10 and older. On 1 December 1936, Schirach was given the position of State Secretary to the Reich Government, as head of a Supreme Reich Authority (Oberste Reichsbehörde).

Some sections of the church scouts and Bundische Jugend resisted forced incorporation. For example, in 1934, in the small town of Wassenberg, Catholic Boy Scouts disrupted the transmission of a speech by Schirach. As a result, their scout uniforms were confiscated by the Aachen State Police Office. Contempt for Schirach was expressed in various songs, such as "Baldur, darling, be clear about this: When a new spirit stirs you will be dumped as soon as possible." (Baldur, Liebling, sei dir darüber im klaren: Wenn ein neuer Geist sich rührt, wirst du schleunigst abserviert.")

The Hitler Youth was a militaristic organisation, with Erwin Rommel serving as liaison officer to the Wehrmacht, in charge of military training for the youth. Rommel attempted to subordinate the Hitler Youth to the Wehrmacht instead of the NSDAP, and managed to trick Schirach into signing a document to that effect. His deputy Hartmann Lauterbacher had previously rejected the proposal, but Schirach was not attentive to details. Schirach had to send Lauterbacher to Hitler to cancel the proposal. Hitler criticised Schirach and Rommel was removed from his position.

Schirach was a Protestant, unlike his father and sister, who had left the Church. He stressed that "the Hitler Youth was neither Protestant nor Catholic, but German", and regularly invoked God in his speeches. In a December 1933 speech he opposed proposals to make the Hitler Youth an explicit alternative to Christianity, saying "They say of us that we are an anti-Christian movement. They even say that I am an outspoken paganist... I solemnly declare here, before the German public, that I stand on the basis of Christianity, but I declare just as solemnly that I will put down every attempt to introduce confessional matters into our Hitler Youth."

In March 1936, Schirach purchased Schloss Aspenstein in Kochel am See. He and Henriette had previously lived in a hunting lodge nearby in Urfeld am Walchensee. In March 1936, Manfred von Brauchitsch and his brother Harald insulted Henriette. Schirach told them they were not men of honour. Manfred challenged Schirach to a duel, but instead Schirach attacked them with a dog whip. Schirach had immunity as a member of the Reichstag.

Schirach was promoted to SA-Obergruppenführer on 9 November 1937. Also in 1937, Schirach founded the Adolf Hitler Schools with Robert Ley. These were under the control of the Hitler Youth rather than the state education authority. In October 1941, Hitler ruled that their exams were equal to those of state high schools.

Schirach formed numerous links with other international youth organisations, particularly Fascist Italy. His deputy Hartmann Lauterbacher met Robert Baden-Powell, founder of the Boy Scouts, and Hitler Youth made cycling trips to England. Trips to England and Hungary were accused of spying. As Reichsjugendführer, Schirach visited France, Turkey, Romania, Slovenia, Greece, Iraq, Iran, and Syria.

With the outbreak of war, almost 90% of Hitler Youth leaders were conscripted, and many were killed in the first few months of the war. There was a rise in juvenile crime due to blackouts, and the Hitler Youth was unable to exert control.

=== Military service ===
In December 1939, Schirach volunteered for military service in the army. After training, he served with the 4th (machine gun) Company of the Großdeutschland infantry regiment in the Battle of Sedan during the French Campaign. Initially he was a dispatch runner in the rank of Gefreiter. He was promoted to Leutnant, served as a platoon leader and was decorated for bravery with the Iron Cross 2nd class, before being recalled to Germany.

In Schirach's absence, the Hitler Youth was administered by Hartmann Lauterbacher. In April 1940, Schirach had Lauterbacher sent for military service, replacing him with Artur Axmann on 3 May.

=== Gauleiter and Reichsstatthalter of Vienna ===
On 7 August 1940, Hitler appointed Schirach to succeed Josef Bürckel as Gauleiter and Reichsstatthalter of the Reichsgau Vienna, powerful posts in which he remained until the end of the war. He was sworn in as Reichsstatthalter by Hitler in Berlin on 29 September 1940. He also succeeded Bürckel as Reich Defense Commissioner of Wehrkreis (Military District) XVII, which, in addition to his own Reichsgau, included Reichsgau Upper Danube, Reichsgau Lower Danube and part of Reichsgau Sudetenland. He retained his position as Reichsleiter for Youth Education.

Bürckel had been widely disliked, partly due to employing mainly functionaries from outside Vienna, and due to his brutal methods. Schirach took a different approach, employing Austrian National Socialists, and ingratiating himself with the Viennese population. He declared his "love for this blessed and gifted city with its immeasurable cultural treasures", but stressed its position in the greater German Volksgemeinschaft ("people's community").

Schirach took up residence in the Hohe Warte villa of his predecessor Bürckel, a building now occupied by the Embassy of Egypt. Henriette was delighted with the move. The Schirachs continued to live luxuriously. They had no qualms about stealing public money and property, and the property of Jews. Their house was decorated with furniture, artworks, rugs and tapestries stolen from Jews; the house itself had belonged to a Jew who had fled the country. One stolen painting by Lucas Cranach the Elder was bought by Schirach, with special permission from Hitler, for 30,000 Reichsmark, more than Schirach's father's annual salary. It was rediscovered in 1999 and sold for $600,000. Another painting by Pieter Brueghel the Younger was stolen from Jews who were deported to Theresienstadt where they died. It was purchased by Schirach for 24,000 Reichsmark, again with permission from Hitler. It was rediscovered in 2003 and sold for $688,000. The Schirachs bought around 12 paintings from Alois Miedl. They bought 25 paintings from the Mühlmann agency, totalling 244,000 Reichsmark, selling most of them at a profit. In 1944, Schirach accepted a violin from the State Opera's collection, which was never returned. Schirach also made presents of public property to other people, such as a valuable table to Galeazzo Ciano, and an Italian Renaissance box to Renato Ricci. After the war, Henriette made claims for confiscated furniture and paintings, included those looted from Jews.

Beginning in October 1940, Schirach was assigned to organise the evacuation of 2.5 million children from cities threatened by Allied bombing, sometimes to foster parents, but increasingly to purpose-built camps. Separating children from their parents was used as an opportunity to indoctrinate them ideologically.

Schirach continued his involvement with the Hitler Youth, pursuing links with other European youth organisations. In March 1941, he planned a Fascist youth umbrella organisation with Artur Axmann. He announced the "European Youth Association" at the fifth Hitler Youth summer games in Breslau on 28 August 1941. The association was actually formed in September 1942 in Vienna, under the joint presidency of Axmann and Aldo Vidussoni, with representatives from numerous European states and Japan. It was here he gave a notorious speech describing his deportation of the Jews to the East as his "contribution to European culture". The closing rally was held on 18 September 1942 on the Heldenplatz. The residents of Vienna considered the rally a waste of resources, as did Goebbels, who banned reporting on the conference. Goebbels criticised the concept of a "Europe of nations" as contrary to goals of German supremacy. The Hitler Youth's European activities were banned on 4 November 1942 by Hitler's decree. Hitler wrote, "party offices must never forget that the tenets and knowledge of National Socialist ideology correspond to the essence of German blood and hence cannot be transposed onto foreign peoples... Hence the NSDAP and its organisations do not have a European or worldwide mission to fulfil." In September 1942, Schirach was given the task of giving a speech to the youth, to counter one Franklin D. Roosevelt had made. Schirach's response to Roosevelt was broadcast on the radio; Goebbels considered it "an extraordinarily effective and well-founded reply".

Schirach also desired to expand Vienna's economic influence, using the Southeastern European Company (Südosteuropa-Gesellschaft, SOEG) founded by Josef Bürckel, and the Vienna Autumn Trade Fair. However, the SOEG was dismissed as a "Viennese breakfast and speeches club without economic impact" by Tilo von Wilmowsky, director of the Mitteleuropäischer Wirtschaftstag (MWT, "Central European Economic Conference"); the SOEG director August Heinrichsbauer thought the society was "pie in the sky"; Ulrich von Hassell thought SOEG was "practically useless". Schirach tried but failed to merge the MWT into SOEG. From 1942 onwards, Schirach was no longer able to influence economic policy, due to Albert Speer's Central Planning Board.

As Gauleiter, Schirach took a hard line against "asocial" behaviour, establishing an "Asocials Committee", which committed people to psychiatric clinics for political reasons.

On 16 November 1942, the jurisdiction of the Reich Defense Commissioners was changed from the Wehrkreis to the Gau level, and Schirach retained control of civil defence measures over only Reichsgau Vienna.

Schirach contributed to literature journals, had "remarkable" views on art, and was an influential patron of the arts. He attended cultural events with his wife, and was president of the Bibliophile Society (Gesellschaft der Bibliophilen). Hitler wanted to deprive Vienna of its cultural pre-eminence, yet Schirach expanded Vienna's cultural programmes, including an exhibition of rare European documents in the Austrian National Library, and displays of Impressionist and Modernist art. At first, Goebbels supported this as a way to keep up morale, and as a "fig leaf" for the German war of aggression. As such, Hitler and Goebbels substantially subsidised the Viennese cultural budget from 1941 to 1943.

Schirach saw the promotion of Viennese culture as a demonstration of his leadership role within the Reich. However, Hitler did not want Vienna to compete with Berlin for cultural status. Hitler wanted Vienna to be "gradually neutralised", with Linz promoted as a cultural "counterweight". Furthermore, Vienna's cultural programmes did not follow official Reich policy. Schirach promoted "Vienna's European mission", but this was rejected by Hitler and Goebbels. As a result, Schirach fell into disfavour with Hitler. In 1942 Wilhelm Rüdiger had curated an art exhibition in Weimar, "Young Art in the German Reich" (Junge Kunst im Deutschen Reich). Schirach brought it to Vienna and had it expanded with works by artists from the Ostmark. The exhibition was denounced by Adolf Ziegler and Benno von Arent. In 1943, Hitler ordered its closure, and Schirach's main cultural advisor [General-Kulturreferent] Walter Thomas, who had previously been criticised by Goebbels, was dismissed. Thomas was to be sent to the Eastern front, but he was found medically unfit for service. Hitler summoned Schirach to the Berghof, saying "It was my mistake to have sent you to Vienna. It was a mistake that I ever brought these Viennese into the Greater German Reich. I know these people. In my youth I lived among them. They are the enemies of Germany." Schirach offered his resignation, which Hitler rejected. In March 1943 Hitler considered ending Schirach's control of Vienna's cultural programmes, and in May 1943 considered sending him away as a diplomat.

Schirach's conflict with Hitler was misperceived by many in Vienna as a form of resistance to Nazi Germany. It may later have helped the Viennese to suppress their sense of responsibility for the Holocaust. In reality, Schirach was a strong National Socialist who used culture to propagandise for war.

An incident at the Berghof on 24 June 1943 intensified Hitler's distaste for Schirach. Schirach's wife Henriette protested to Hitler about deportations of Jewish women she had witnessed in Amsterdam. Hitler was enraged, shouting "You're sentimental... what have the Jews in Holland got to do with you? It's all sentimentality, humanity claptrap. You have to learn to hate..." According to Henriette, the Schirachs were told to leave immediately. While it was not the last time Baldur von Schirach saw Hitler, the Schirachs were never again invited to the Berghof. Earlier in the day, Schirach had annoyed Hitler by saying the war had to be stopped. Hitler later said, "He knows as well as I do that there is no way out. I might as well shoot myself in the head as think of negotiating peace." Hitler made it clear he no longer wanted anything to do with Schirach. Hitler also criticised Schirach's attempt to prevent the movement of armament factories to Vienna. At the Nuremberg trials, Schirach said his conflict with Hitler grew over three days, beginning when Schirach had argued for an autonomous Ukraine within the Reich, rather than the oppressive policy of Erich Koch. Henriette's protest was on the first or second evening. According to Baldur von Schirach, they had planned that she would broach the "Jewish question", as he was unable to bring up the subject. On the third evening, Goebbels brought up the subject of Vienna, and Hitler spoke with hatred about the Viennese. Goebbels wrote, "Frau von Schirach in particular behaves like a stupid turkey... The Führer doesn't want to know Schirach anymore. Schirach is a weakling, a windbag and an idiot when it comes to deep political matters. He would rather dismiss him from Vienna sooner than later, if only he had a successor." Henriette von Schirach had asked Hitler to send Baldur to Munich as Gauleiter, swapping positions with Paul Giesler; Hitler refused. Hugo Jury later declined to succeed Schirach. Jury and Karl Scharizer defended Schirach, but Scharizer increasingly took over his work. While generally positive about Schirach, Scharizer wrote "Schirach somehow lives in a different world, in a high tower, as it were, pursuing his hobbies. He thinks about foreign policy and wants to sort it out... Without noticing, Schirach lives a life that is not in keeping with the times. He cannot empathize with the life and way of living of the common people."

According to Frederic Spotts, Schirach "was a man who thought of himself as a National Socialist poet laureate; he had great cultural pretensions but no political ambitions." He wrote "flamboyant Nazi poetry"; he was a "prima donna", "concerned with personal prestige and therefore artistic quality rather than with party doctrine." Contra Spotts, Oliver Rathkolb portrayed Schirach as an ideological antisemite, politically ambitious and relatively skilled at bureaucratic politics, for whom his appointment as Gauleiter of Vienna "ultimately amounted to a political setback ... a clear sign he had become less important politically."

On Whitsun 1943, two Austrian NKVD agents, Josef Angermann and his radio operator Georg Kennerknect, were parachute-dropped into Vienna, with a mission to assassinate Schirach. According to Johann Sanitzer, a Gestapo counter-intelligence agent, Schirach was number four on their death list, behind Hitler and Hermann Göring (Sanitzer did not remember who was number three). They were identified by the Gestapo, but Ernst Kaltenbrunner decided not to publicise their capture so as not to increase his rival Schirach's popularity.

Schirach was notoriously anxious about Allied air raids, fleeing in public view to his Gaugefechtsstand Wien ("Gau Command Center Vienna") whenever air raid sirens sounded. He had sent his children away to the Schloss Aspenstein, followed by Henriette in late autumn 1944 (their art collection was shipped separately). Schirach's mother Emma had burned to death on 16 July 1944 when a plane crashed into her house in Wiesbaden and she attempted to rescue her dog. Schirach evacuated approximately one third of the children of Vienna, and in September 1944 organised the rescue of 2,000 children from Slovakia, which had become contested territory – an operation in which 15 men died. Hitler and Goebbels thought Schirach had not done enough to protect Vienna from air raids, but there was little he could do due to the centralised armaments policy. In 1941, Göring had ordered him to stop building air raid shelters. Flak towers were constructed from 1942. Schirach's December 1943 proposal to evacuate 300,000 women and children from Vienna was rejected.

On 25 September 1944, Schirach became the commander of the Volkssturm units in his Gau.

On 24 February 1945, Hitler called a meeting of most of his Gauleiter in Berlin. Attendees included Schirach and Hugo Jury. Hitler ordered that Vienna was to be held at any price, as part of a policy of "total warfare". Schirach ignored recommendations by Albrecht Schubert, Ludwig Merker, Hans Dellbrügge and Hanns Blaschke to declare Vienna a "free city". However, Austrian soldiers ignored Schirach's orders, and planned defence measures did not exist. Vienna came under attack by the Red Army on 2 April 1945. On 4 April 1945, he moved to the vaulted cellars of the Vienna Hofburg. Otto Skorzeny described the atmosphere: "On the floor lay splendid rugs, on the walls hung paintings of battles and portraits of generals from the eighteenth century. In this antechamber, people ate, drank and were noisy." Skorzeny invited Schirach to undertake a reconnaissance trip to see the unmanned barricades, but Schirach refused. Another witness, Karl Zischka, described people consuming champagne and caviar: "everyone believed in victory. Everyone believed in the miracle weapon that was yet to be deployed somehow."

By 9 April, the Red Army were approaching the city centre. Schirach was aware that a military resistance group led by Major Carl Szokoll had made contact with them. Schirach broadcast a final call for citizens to fight "to the last man" and then departed his headquarters. He moved initially to Flandorf, north of Vienna, where he acted as a liaison officer between Sepp Dietrich of the 6th Panzer Army and Wilhelm Bittrich of the II SS Panzer Corps, with the rank of lieutenant. Dietrich concentrated on retreat. Schirach worked for Dietrich for three weeks. He stayed briefly in Altmelon, then the entire company moved west.

Schirach was determined to avoid being captured by the Red Army. He went to Gmunden on 1 May. After news came of Hitler's suicide, he fled west with his adjutant and close colleague Fritz Wieshofer, and their chauffeur Franz Ram. At Schwaz their car broke down. On 2 May, he discarded his uniform, grew a moustache and posed as a crime writer, "Dr Richard Falk".

On 4 June 1945, he finally surrendered to the American town commandant and was arrested by the 103rd Counterintelligence Corps. He was interned in Rum prison camp outside Innsbruck, where he was treated well and allowed to see Henriette for a few hours in June. In August he was moved to a US interrogation camp at Oberursel, where he signed a declaration that he was responsible for building the Hitler Youth until 1940, and considered himself responsible for the organisation even up to the end of the war. On 10 September 1945 he was flown to Nuremberg to be put on trial, believing he would be sentenced to death.

=== Deportation of Jews ===
Schirach was an antisemite, responsible for sending most of the Jews from Vienna to Nazi concentration camps. During his tenure, 65,000 Jews were deported. In a speech on 15 September 1942, he said that their deportation was a "contribution to European culture". He attacked "unscrupulous Jewish moneymaking" and claimed that

"Jewry attempted with all available means to spoil the healthy youth ... Ethos is alien to the Jew ... every Jew at large in Europe is a danger to European culture. If one wished to confront me with the accusation that I have deported tens of thousands upon tens of thousands of Jews to the eastern ghetto from this city that was once the metropolis of Jewry, I must answer that I consider it an active contribution to European culture."

In a speech on 6 June 1942, shortly after the assassination of Reinhard Heydrich by Czechslovak agents, Schirach declared,

When I came here in 1940, I told our Führer that I consider my main task to be making this city free of Jews. This evening, I can tell you that in the autumn of this year, 1942, we will experience the celebration of a Vienna purified of Jews [sustained thunderous applause]. Now, as far as the Czechs in this city are concerned. ... I give my subordinate offices of the state and the party the order after the complete evacuation of the Jews to remove all Czechs [sustained thunderous applause] ... just as I will make this city free of Jews, I will also make it free of Czechs! [sustained rapturous applause]

Schirach later worried this speech would damage his reputation in artistic circles. Discussion of the "Czech question" in public was quickly forbidden by Hitler's secretary Martin Bormann and Goebbels. Schirach promoted the antisemitic writer Colin Ross. On 12 May 1942, Schirach heard a private speech by Arthur Greiser, in which Greiser said that of 800,000 Jews interned in the Litzmannstadt ghetto, only 45,000 slaves remained alive. Greiser said,

"Now you will quite rightly ask why there so few Jews left today in the ghetto and outside it too, and here I say to you as a National Socialist: I cannot answer this question in such a circle in detail. I can only answer by saying that the Jews there are of course becoming fewer [in number], down to the 45,000 who actually work – and the Viennese Jews we have received in the meantime, they too have already been put to work... Some of them did not want to stay in the ghetto at all, because they didn't like it there, and they wanted to be better situated and make their peace with their Jew god, and we gave them a hand with that and... [Great amusement and strong applause]."

Schirach had also heard a speech in Posen by Heinrich Himmler on 6 October 1943, in which Himmler had described his decision to "exterminate" women and children as well as men. Schirach later claimed that he instructed his colleague Hans Dellbrügge to reduce capacity for deportations, however there is no evidence for this claim. According to Wilhelm Bienenfeld, a Viennese Jew, Schirach must have known about the deportations because of the number of people who asked him to intervene. He refused to intervene on numerous occasions, including on behalf of five retired members of the Vienna Philharmonic orchestra, of which he was patron, or on behalf of family friend Josef Krips.

The only case in which Schirach made a great effort on behalf of a Jew was the case of Alice Strauss, the Jewish daughter-in-law of composer Richard Strauss. The Strausses had moved to Vienna so they could be afforded the protection of Schirach. However, 25 of her relatives were murdered in Nazi concentration camps. In January 1944, Alice and Franz Strauss were abducted by the Viennese Gestapo and imprisoned for two nights. Strauss's personal appeal to Schirach saved them, allowing him to take them back to his estate at Garmisch-Partenkirchen, where they remained under house arrest until the end of the war. Later during the war, Schirach pleaded for a moderate treatment of the eastern European peoples and criticised the conditions in which Jews were being deported.

Martin Bormann told Schirach to use deportation of Jews as a means to alleviate housing shortages, rather than diverting resources from the war effort to the building of new apartments.

On 16 August 1943, Schirach visited Mauthausen concentration camp. He was not shown the gas facility, but saw the camp crematorium being used to burn only "bodies that had died normal deaths". He saw a performance by the camp symphony orchestra. He asked commandant Franz Ziereis if prisoners ever left the camp, and was told that they did.

== Trial and conviction ==
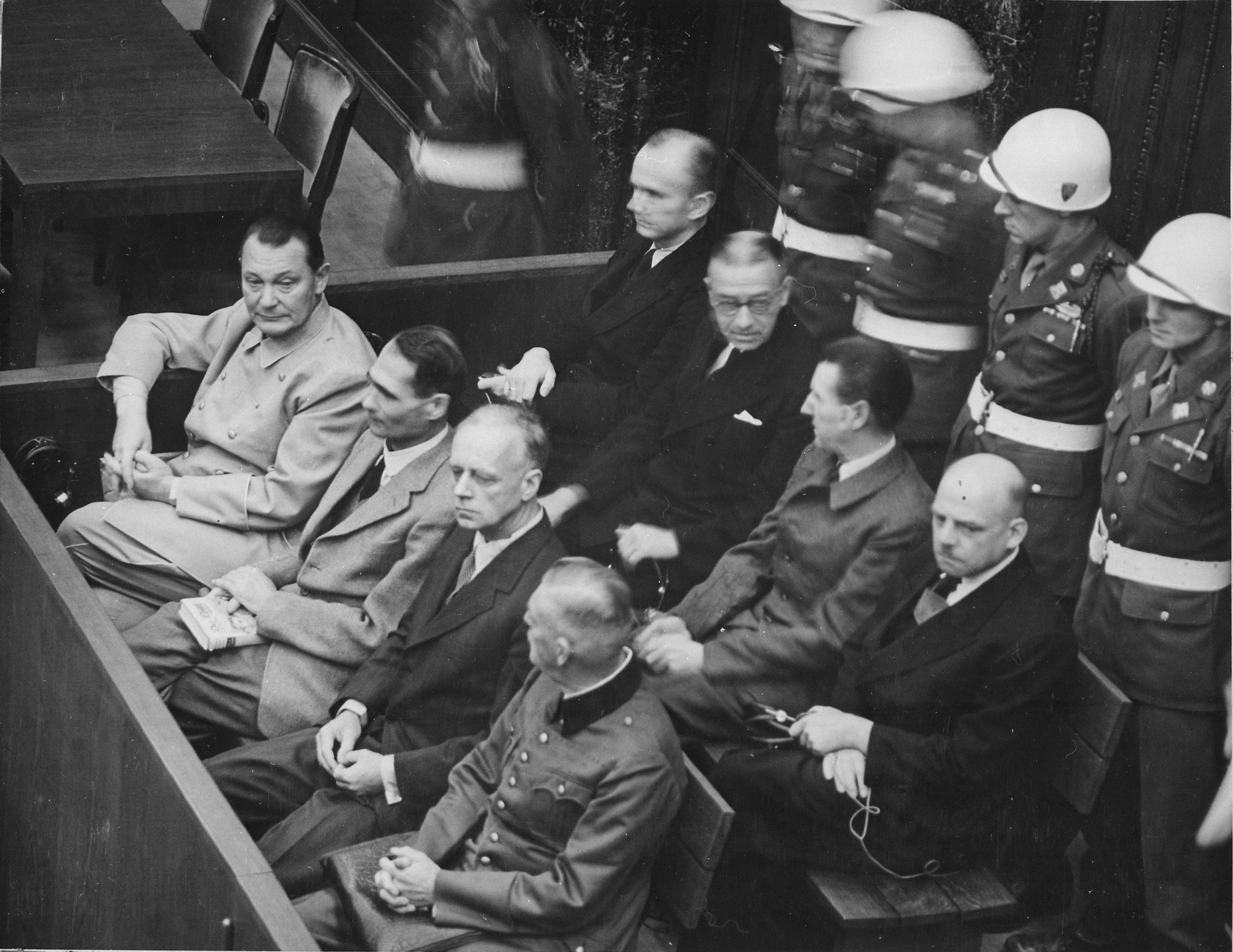
Schirach at the Nuremberg trials (in second row, second from right)

Schirach was one of the 22 major Nazis put on trial at Nuremberg by the International Military Tribunal, and at age 38 the youngest of the group. He was indicted for crimes against humanity for his role in the deportation of the Viennese Jews to certain death in German concentration camps located in German-occupied Poland. He was also indicted for crimes against peace for his role in building up the Hitler Youth.

At the trial, Schirach was one of only a few defendants (along with Albert Speer and Hans Frank) to denounce Hitler. Schirach's strategy was very different from other defendants such as Göring, who didn't want any of the defendants to say anything against Hitler. Like Speer, Schirach rejected legal responsibility for the Holocaust. Schirach admitted to being a former anti-Semite, but attributed these views to his reading of the American Henry Ford's The International Jew: "I read it and became anti-Semitic." He was also influenced by Houston Stewart Chamberlain and Adolf Bartels, who was Schirach's private tutor. Nonetheless, according to Oliver Rathkolb, antisemitism was deeply rooted in German elites from before 1914, and was especially part of Schirach's Weimar environment.

Schirach repudiated his antisemitism, and denounced Hitler and the Holocaust:

It is the greatest, the most devilish mass murder known to history. ... The murder was ordered by Adolf Hitler, as is obvious from his last will and testament... He and Himmler jointly committed that crime which, for all time, will be a stain in the annals of our history. It is a crime which fills every German with shame.

He had prepared this statement carefully.

Schirach called his former adjutants Gustav Höpken and Fritz Wieshofer as witnesses, as well as Hartmann Lauterbacher. Höpken denied that Schirach had seen Reinhard Heydrich's reports about German war crimes, and portrayed him as a supporter of the Christian churches. Weishofer claimed that Schirach's office had made interventions on behalf of individual Jews. Lauterbacher claimed that Schirach had forbidden the Hitler Youth to take part in pogroms and looting in November 1938, although this was after the pogroms had taken place. Schirach played up his 1943 break with Hitler, and his American ancestry. His lawyer was Dr Fritz Sauter, a well-known defence lawyer from Munich who had been a member of the Nazi Party. Sauter also defended Walther Funk and others at Nuremberg. Sauter argued that Schirach had confessed to his mistakes and was determined to rectify them: "Such a defendant must be given consideration for trying to repair as far as he can the damage which he caused in good faith."

Schirach claimed he had not known about the extermination camps; however, the trial detailed his involvement in deportations of Jews and his speeches defending his actions. During Schirach's cross-examination, Thomas J. Dodd presented documents which had passed through Schirach's office, which showed that tens of thousands of Jews had been sent from Vienna to Riga, and tens of thousands of Jews in Riga had been shot. Schirach denied having seen the documents. Schirach claimed to have first heard of the exterminations through Colin Ross, in 1944.

Regarding the accusation of crimes against peace for his leadership of the Hitler Youth, he presented the Hitler Youth as a youth organisation like the Boy Scouts, rather than a paramilitary organisation responsible for war crimes:

I have educated this generation in faith and loyalty to Hitler. The Youth Organization which I built up bore his name. I believed that I was serving a leader who would make our people and the youth of our country great and happy and free. Millions of young people believed this, together with me, and saw their ultimate ideal in National Socialism. Many died for it. Before God, before the German nation, and before my German people I alone bear the guilt of having trained our young people for a man whom I for many long years had considered unimpeachable, both as a leader and as the head of the State, of creating for him a generation who saw him as I did. The guilt is mine in that I educated the youth of Germany for a man who murdered by the millions. I believed in this man, that is all I can say for my excuse and for the characterization of my attitude. This is my own—my own personal guilt. I was responsible for the youth of the country. I was placed in authority over the young people, and the guilt is mine alone. The younger generation is guiltless. It grew up in an anti-Semitic state, ruled by anti-Semitic laws. Our youth was bound by these laws and saw nothing criminal in racial politics. But if anti-Semitism and racial laws could lead to an Auschwitz, then Auschwitz must mark the end of racial politics and the death of anti-Semitism. Hitler is dead. I never betrayed him; I never tried to overthrow him; I remained true to my oath as an officer, a youth leader, and an official. I was no blind collaborator of his; neither was I an opportunist. I was a convinced National Socialist from my earliest days—as such, I was also an anti-Semite. Hitler's racial policy was a crime which led to disaster for 5,000,000 Jews and for all the Germans. The younger generation bears no guilt. But he who, after Auschwitz, still clings to racial politics has rendered himself guilty.

He claimed that members of the Hitler Youth were innocent of any of the German war crimes:

In this hour, when I can speak for the last time to the Military Tribunal of the four victorious powers, I should like, with a clear conscience, to confirm the following on behalf of our German youth: that it is completely innocent of the abuses and degeneration of the Hitler regime which were established during this Trial, that it never wanted this war, and that neither in peace nor in war did it participate in any crimes.

Dodd also presented a telegram from Schirach arguing for a violent air attack on a British cultural town in response to the assassination of Reinhard Heydrich.

One of the biggest problems for the prosecution was lack of evidence. The trial was taking place so soon after the war that comprehensive evidence had not yet been assembled. The inexperienced prosecutor Dodd was not able to penetrate Schirach's defence strategy. The Soviet prosecution also had problems with translation, and a witness statement of a massacre by the Hitler Youth in Lviv in 1941 that was submitted too late.

According to Gustave Gilbert, an American psychologist who observed Schirach over the course of the trial, Göring attempted to "turn" Schirach. A separate dining area was established for Schirach, Speer, Hans Fritzsche and Walther Funk to remove Schirach and Funk from Göring's influence. Gilbert administered the Wechsler–Bellevue intelligence test to the defendants; Schirach displayed an IQ of 130. Over the course of the trial, Schirach was interviewed daily by psychiatrist Douglas Kelley. Schirach was also examined by Chief Medical Officer Lt. Col. Rene Juchli who reported that Schirach was suffering from "inflammation of the left eardrum".

While on trial and expecting to be hanged, Schirach along with Speer and Fritzsche received the Eucharist from Lutheran Pastor Henry F. Gerecke.

Schirach was acquitted of crimes against peace, but he was found guilty on 1 October 1946 of crimes against humanity. The court concluded that despite the warlike nature of the Hitler Youth, Schirach was not involved in Hitler's plans for aggressive war. However, regarding his deportation of Vienna's Jews, the court found that Schirach knew they would face a miserable life at best, and that bulletins describing their extermination were in his office. He was sentenced to 20 years in Spandau Prison, Berlin.

== Later life ==
On 20 July 1949, his wife Henriette von Schirach (1913–1992) divorced him while he was in prison. However, she travelled to London in 1958, with financial support from the Daily Mail, to lobby British Foreign Secretary Selwyn Lloyd for a reduction of his prison sentence. She was unsuccessful. She described her husband as "in no way a criminal, but an idealist, and much too good for politics." Unlike other prisoners, he had no one else to lobby for his release.

In December 1963, he was sent for two weeks to the British Military Hospital to treat a blood clot in his femoral artery. In February 1965 he was again taken to military hospital for an operation on the retina of his right eye, which was unsuccessful. After the operation, he suffered a thrombosis.

Schirach was released from prison on 1 October 1966, after serving his full sentence. He agreed to a series of interviews with Stern magazine. Schirach described his trial as a "show trial". The 1,500 pages of transcripts were compiled into his memoirs, "I believed in Hitler" (Ich glaubte an Hitler, 1967), and were the basis of a biography by Jochen von Lang. His memoirs were much less successful than his wife Henriette's fantastical memoir "The Price of Glory", although he received generous fees from Stern.

In an interview with NBC shortly after his release, he expressed regret over having not done enough to prevent atrocities from being committed.

Schirach was interviewed in English by British journalist David Frost. In the interview, he reflects on his imprisonment, meeting with Hitler, and the deportation of the Jews. Contrary to his testimony at Nuremberg, he denied his antisemitism. He again claimed to have no knowledge of the extermination, and deflected guilt in regard to discriminatory education laws: "the whole generation was wrong". He described Hitler as "a man without measure [i.e. without any sense of measure], a man with great gifts, a man who in some ways could be considered a genius".

After his release from prison, Schirach moved first to the Stubenrauch villa in Munich, which his son Robert rented for him. In 1968, he moved to an estate in Deibhalde, Trossingen, owned by Fritz Kiehn (1885–1980), a businessman who had been a Nazi member of the Reichstag and an SS-Hauptsturmführer on Heinrich Himmler's personal staff. His son Robert married Kiehn's granddaughter Elke, and Robert became managing director of one of Kiehn's companies. Baldur was looked after by Kiehn's daughter Gretl, ex-wife of Fritz Wieshofer and mother of Elke from her first marriage, and they holidayed together.

Around 1966, Helmut Wobisch, lead trumpeter and then managing director of the Vienna Philharmonic, who had been a member of the SS and an informant of the SD, travelled to Schirach to give him the Philharmonic's "ring of honour", to replace one Schirach had been given on 27 March 1942. After the war, the Philharmonic's board was full of SS men.

Schirach later turned down further interviews, saying he ought not to comment on public matters due to his role under Hitler.

In 1971, with his eyesight failing, Schirach moved to the Pension Müllen, the former Montroyal hotel in Kröv an der Mosel, which was run by two former BDM leaders Ida and Käthe Müllen. He consumed alcohol to excess. He died there on 8 August 1974, aged 67, of coronary thrombosis, and was buried in Kröv. Käthe Müllen chose his epitaph, "I was one of you" (Ich war einer von Euch).

Schirach did not leave a large fortune: his mother's American property had been seized in 1944 and his father's American assets were confiscated in 1947. After Carl's death in 1948, Baldur and Rosalind inherited the fortune, but it continued to be managed by the Office of Alien Property Custodian.

The right to use his grave site was repeatedly extended, until it was finally removed in Spring 2015.

== Books ==
- Hitler as no one knows him (1932, Hitler wie ihn keiner kennt)
- The Hitler Youth (1943)
- Hitler Youth Yearbook 1934 (Hitlerjugend Jahrbuch)
- Adolf Hitler's Reich: A Photographic Record of the Creation of Greater Germany, 1933 to 1940 (1940, Das Reich Adolf Hitlers: ein Bildbuch vom Werden Grossdeutschlands 1933 bis 1940)
- Revolution der Erziehung (Revolution of Education) by Baldur von Schirach
- Die Hitler-Jugend – Idee und Gestalt (The Hitler Youth – Idea and Character) by Baldur von Schirach
- Die Fahne der Verfolgten (The Flag of the Persecuted), collection of poetry
- Goethe an uns (Goethe to Us) by Baldur von Schirach
- Das Lied der Getreuen (The Lay of the Faithful); more poetry

== See also ==
- Glossary of Nazi Germany
- List of Nazi Party leaders and officials
- The Holocaust in Austria
