= Colin Ross (footballer) =

Scottish footballer

Personal information
- Full name: Colin Ross
- Date of birth: 29 August 1962 (age 64)
- Place of birth: Dailly, Ayrshire, Scotland
- Position: Midfielder

Youth career
- 19??–1978: Ayr United B.C.
- 1978–1980: Middlesbrough

Senior career*
Years	Team	Apps	(Gls)
1980–1983	Middlesbrough	38	(0)
1983	→ Chesterfield (loan)	6	(0)
1983–1985	Darlington	14	(0)
–	South Bank		
–	Whitby Town		
- * Club domestic league appearances and goals

Colin Ross (born 29 August 1962) is a Scottish former footballer who played as a midfielder in the Football League for Middlesbrough, Chesterfield and Darlington. He joined Middlesbrough from Ayr United Boys Club in 1978, and after leaving Darlington played non-league football for South Bank and Whitby Town.

According to the Observer, "Ross hobbled into the record books after hurting his knee and being substituted just five seconds into [Darlington's] match with Chester" in October 1983.
