= Reichsgau Wien =

Reichsgau Vienna
- Reichsgau of Nazi Germany
- 1938–1945
- Flag Coat of arms

- Map of Nazi Germany showing its administrative subdivisions (Gaue and Reichsgaue)
- Capital: Vienna
- Population
  - 1939: 1,920,390
- Government
- Gauleiter
  - 1938–1939: Odilo Globočnik
  - 1939–1940: Joseph Bürckel
  - 1940–1945: Baldur von Schirach
- History
  - Anschluss: 12 March 1938
  - Vienna offensive: 16 March –15 April 1945
  - German surrender: 8 May 1945
Preceded by	Succeeded by
Vienna; Lower Austria	Vienna; Lower Austria
- Today part of: Austria

The Reichsgau Vienna (German: Reichsgau Wien) was an administrative division of Nazi Germany based in Vienna, Austria. It existed between 1938 and 1945. Parts of Lower Austria were annexed to establish Greater Vienna, which then became the biggest city of Nazi Germany by area.

== History ==
The Nazi Gau (plural Gaue) system was originally established in a party conference on 22 May 1926, in order to improve administration of the party structure. From 1933 onwards, after the Nazi seizure of power, the Gaue increasingly replaced the German states as administrative subdivisions in Germany. On 12 March 1938 Nazi Germany annexed Austria and on 24 May the Austrian provinces were reorganized and replaced by seven Nazi party Gaue. Under the Ostmarkgesetz law of 14 April 1939 with effect of 1 May, the Austrian Gaue were raised to the status of Reichsgaue and their Gauleiters were subsequently also named Reichsstatthalters.

At the head of each Gau stood a Gauleiter, a position which became increasingly more powerful, especially after the outbreak of the Second World War. Local Gauleiters were in charge of propaganda and surveillance and, from September 1944 onwards, the Volkssturm and the defence of the Gau.

The position of Gauleiter in Vienna was initially held by Odilo Globočnik from 24 May 1938 to 30 January 1939, by Josef Bürckel to 2 August 1940 and by Baldur von Schirach for the remainder of the Reichsgau's history up to 8 May 1945.
