= Reichsjugendführer =

Highest paramilitary rank of the Hitler Youth

National Youth Leader
- Reichsjugendführer
- Reichsjugendführer gorget patch

- Standard for the Reichsjugendführer
- Nazi Party
- Status: Abolished
- Abbreviation: RJF
- Member of: Hitler Youth
- Appointer: Führer of the NSDAP
- Formation: 1931
- First holder: Baldur von Schirach
- Final holder: Artur Axmann
- Abolished: 1945
- Deputy: Stabsführer

Reichsjugendführer ("National Youth Leader") was the highest paramilitary rank of the Hitler Youth. On 30 October 1931, Hitler appointed Baldur von Schirach as the Reich Youth Leader of the Nazi Party. In 1933, after the Nazi seizure of state power, all youth organizations in Germany were brought under Schirach's control and he was designated the Jugendführer des Deutschen Reiches on 17 June. When Schirach was named Gauleiter of the Reichsgau Vienna on 8 August 1940, Artur Axmann succeeded him as Reichsjugendführer. Axmann had served as Schirach's deputy since 1 May 1940.

== List ==
No.	Portrait	Reichsjugendführer	Took office	Left office	Time in office
1	Baldur von Schirach	Baldur von Schirach (1907–1974)	30 October 1931	8 August 1940	8 years, 283 days
2	Artur Axmann	Artur Axmann (1913–1996)	8 August 1940	8 May 1945	5 years, 7 days

== Post-war ==
With the surrender of Nazi Germany, the Hitler Youth was disbanded by Allied authorities as part of the denazification process. Both Schirach and Axmann were condemned as war criminals by the leading Allied Powers after the end of the Second World War in Europe, in particular for the role the two played in corrupting the minds of children. Schirach was sentenced to 20 years in prison. Axmann received only a 39-month prison sentence in May 1949. Later, in 1958, a West Berlin court fined Axman 35,000 marks (approximately £3,000, or US$8,300), about half the value of his property in Berlin. The court found him guilty of indoctrinating German youth with National Socialism until the end of the war.
