= Colin Ross (writer) =

German writer and filmmaker (1885–1945)

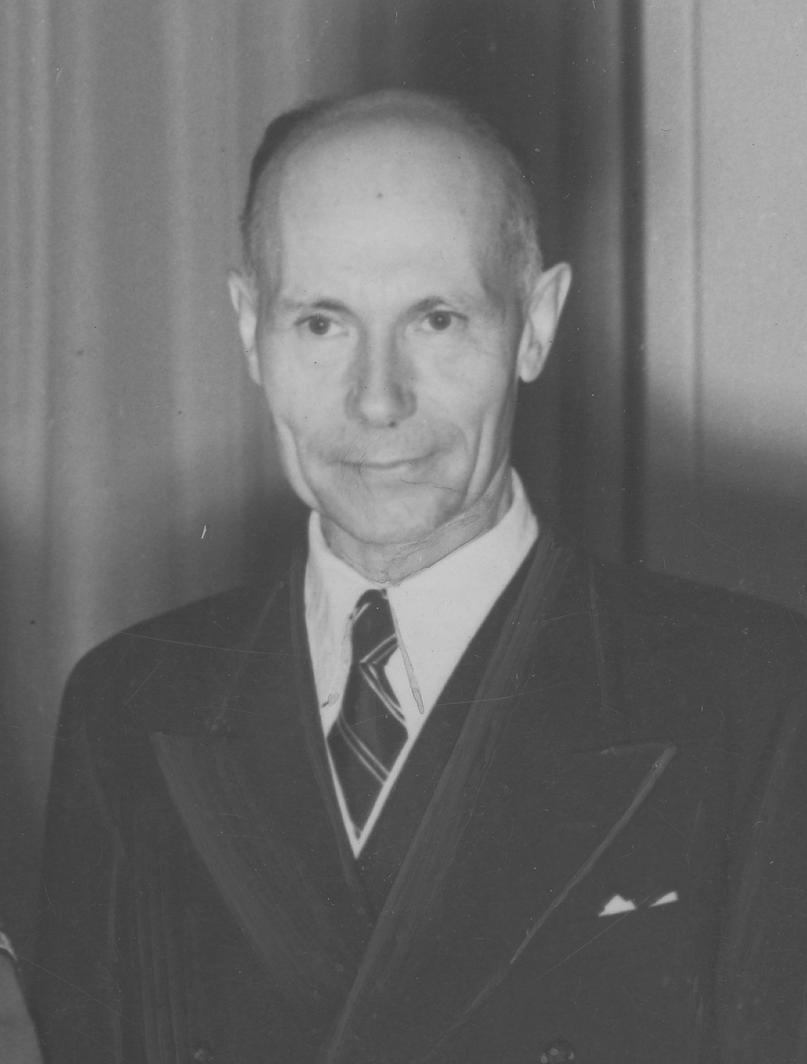
Ross in 1940

Colin Ross (German: Colin Roß, 4 June 1885 – 29 April 1945) was an Austrian travel writer and film-maker. He was a considered a "household name" during the interwar period. Between 1910 and 1945, he published 35 books, six films, and around 1,200 articles.

== Early life and education ==
Born in Vienna, he served for one year in the Bavarian Field Artillery, after which he studied engineering in Berlin and economics and history in Munich and Heidelberg. His name—unusual for an Austrian—is said to result from his British (specifically Scottish) ancestry.

== Career ==
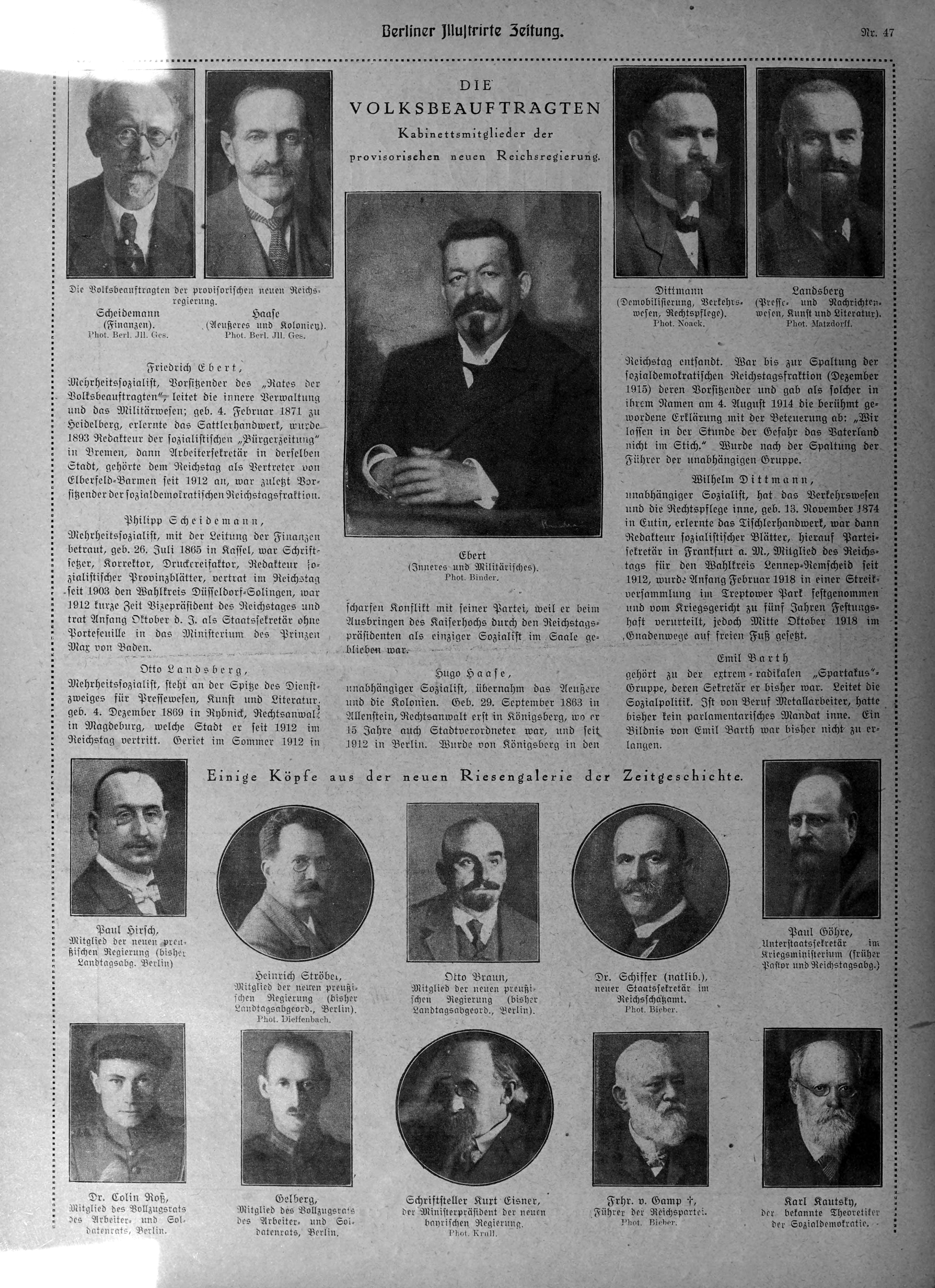
Ross (bottom row, far left) in the Berliner Illustrirte Zeitung, 24 November 1918

In 1913 he worked as a war reporter in the Balkan War between the Ottoman Empire and Bulgaria, and in the Mexican Civil War. He continued working as a journalist during the First World War, and also served as a first lieutenant (Oberleutnant) on the Russian front, where he was wounded. He then worked in the propaganda department of the Supreme Army Command.

After the German revolution of 1918 and 1919, he worked as a military advisor to the Executive Council of the Workers' and Soldiers' Soviets.

He travelled to South America, starting in Argentina followed by Chile, then Bolivia. He worked as a travel writer and travel filmmaker, shooting with a Bamberg-Askania camera. One of his best known films was 1926's Around the World With a Movie Camera. With his family, he visited every continent except Antarctica, with the travels financed by film and camera manufacturers. He often reworked the same material in multiple publications, and his work was widely syndicated. His third major journey was from winter 1923 to late September 1924, visiting the United States, the Pacific, East Asia and South Asia, resulting in multiple travel books. At the time, the travelogue was a novel and popular format.

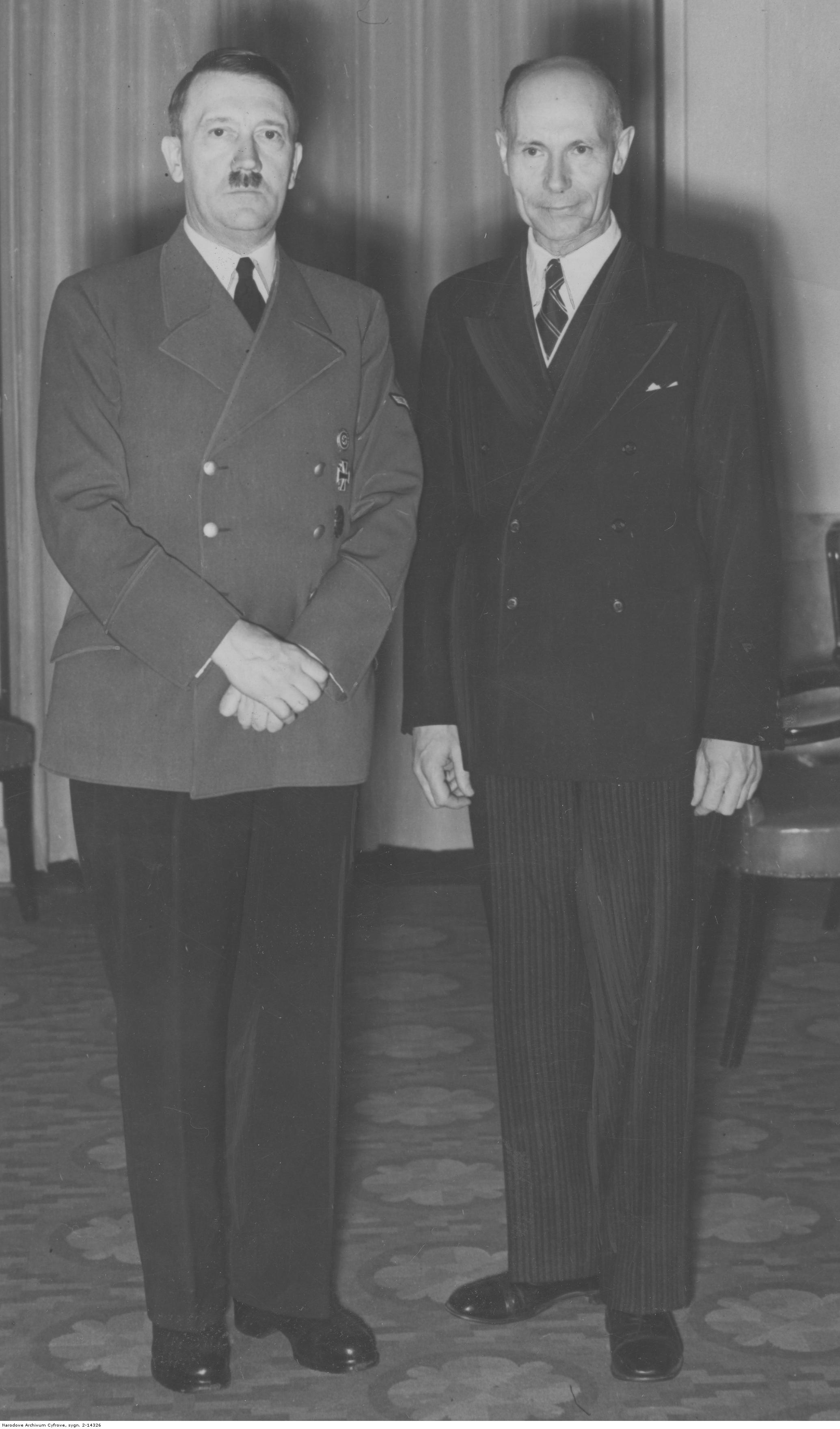
Ross with Adolf Hitler in Berlin

Ross was an opponent of democracy, setting out his ideas in his 1931 book The Will of the World (Der Wille der Welt), described by Oliver Rathkolb as "very subtly formulated totalitarian political ideas". His political mentor was Karl Haushofer, who introduced him to the Nazi Party elite. He gave talks at various Nazi events, and joined the Party in 1941. In 1941 he also joined the German Foreign Office's America Committee, becoming its head in 1944. It worked to undermine Franklin D. Roosevelt's re-election campaign. According to Baldur von Schirach, Ross proposed expelling all Jews from Hungary, and sending them to America. During the Nuremberg trials, Schirach claimed he had first learned about The Holocaust from Ross, who had heard about it via foreign newspapers.

Ross was described by Ernst Wallenberg, a Jewish journalist, as a political opportunist, changing from democratic to communist to Nazi, and from pro-Jewish to antisemitic. This assessment was shared by Oliver Rathkolb.

After their Munich apartment was destroyed, Ross and his wife moved to a hut owned by Schirach or his brother-in-law in Urfeld am Walchensee. They committed suicide, by cyanide, then gunshot, on 29 April 1945.

== Personal life ==
Ross was married to Lisa Ross, née Peter. They had two children, Renate Ross-Rahte (1915–2004) and Ralph Colin Ross (1923–1941). Ralph Colin was killed during the German invasion of the Soviet Union, by being struck by lightning. Renate is featured in the 1998 ZDF documentary Hitler's Henchmen: Schirach, Corrupter of the Youth.

== Films ==
- Around the World With a Movie Camera (1926, German: Mit dem Kurbelkasten um die Erde)
- Attention Australia! Attention Asia! The Double-Face of the East (1930, German: Achtung Australien! Achtung Asien! Das Doppelgesicht des Ostens)

== Books ==
- South America: The Ascending World (1922, German: Südamerika: Die aufsteigende Welt)
- The Will of the World (1931, German: Der Wille der Welt)
