= Benedict von Schirach =

Benedict von Schirach or Benedikt von Schirach:

- Gottlob Benedikt von Schirach (1743–1804), a Sorbian historian, philosopher and writer
- Baldur Benedikt von Schirach (1907–1974), a Nazi German politician
- Ferdinand Benedikt von Schirach (born 1964), a German lawyer and writer
- Benedict Wells (born 1984), a German-Swiss novelist born Benedict von Schirach

== See also ==
- Schirach family
- Schirach (disambiguation)
