= Schirach =

Schirach or von Schirach may refer to:

- Ariadne von Schirach (born 1978), German writer
- Baldur von Schirach (1907–1974), Nazi German politician
- Benedict Wells (born 1984), German-Swiss novelist born Benedict von Schirach
- Carl von Schirach (1873–1948), German theatre director
- Ferdinand von Schirach (born 1964), German lawyer and writer
- Gottlob Benedikt von Schirach (1743–1804), Sorbian historian, philosopher, writer and publisher
- Henriette von Schirach (1913–1992), Baldur von Schirach's wife
- Otto von Schirach (born 1978), US-American DJ
- Richard von Schirach (1942–2023), German author
- Rosalind von Schirach (1898–1981), German opera singer
- Victor von Schirach (born 1984), Swedish actor

== See also ==
- Schirach family
