= Seethaler =

Seethaler is a surname. Notable people with the surname include:

- Johann Alois Seethaler (1775–1835), German goldsmith
- Joseph Anton Seethaler (1740–1811), German goldsmith and silver dealer
- Nils Seethaler (born 1981), German cultural anthropologist
- Robert Seethaler (born 1966), Austrian novelist and actor
