= Williams Middleton =

- Born: 1809; Sullivan's Island, South Carolina
- Died: August 23, 1883 (aged 73–74); Greenville
- Spouse: Susan Smith (m. 1849)
- Children: 2
- Parent(s): Henry Middleton; Mary Helen Hering
- Relatives: Edward Middleton (brother); Arthur Middleton (grandfather)

Williams Middleton (1809 – August 23, 1883) best known as a signer of the South Carolina Ordinance of Secession, and as one of the owners of Middleton Place, National Historic Landmark gardens outside Charleston, SC.

== Early life ==
Born in 1809 in Sullivan's Island, South Carolina, the son of Henry Middleton (1770–1846) and the former Mary Helen Hering (a daughter of Julines Hering, a planter on Jamaica). Williams went to school in England and Paris, while his father served as the U.S. Ambassador to Russia.

His paternal grandfather, Arthur Middleton, and great-grandfather, Henry Middleton, both served in the Continental Congress.

== Career ==
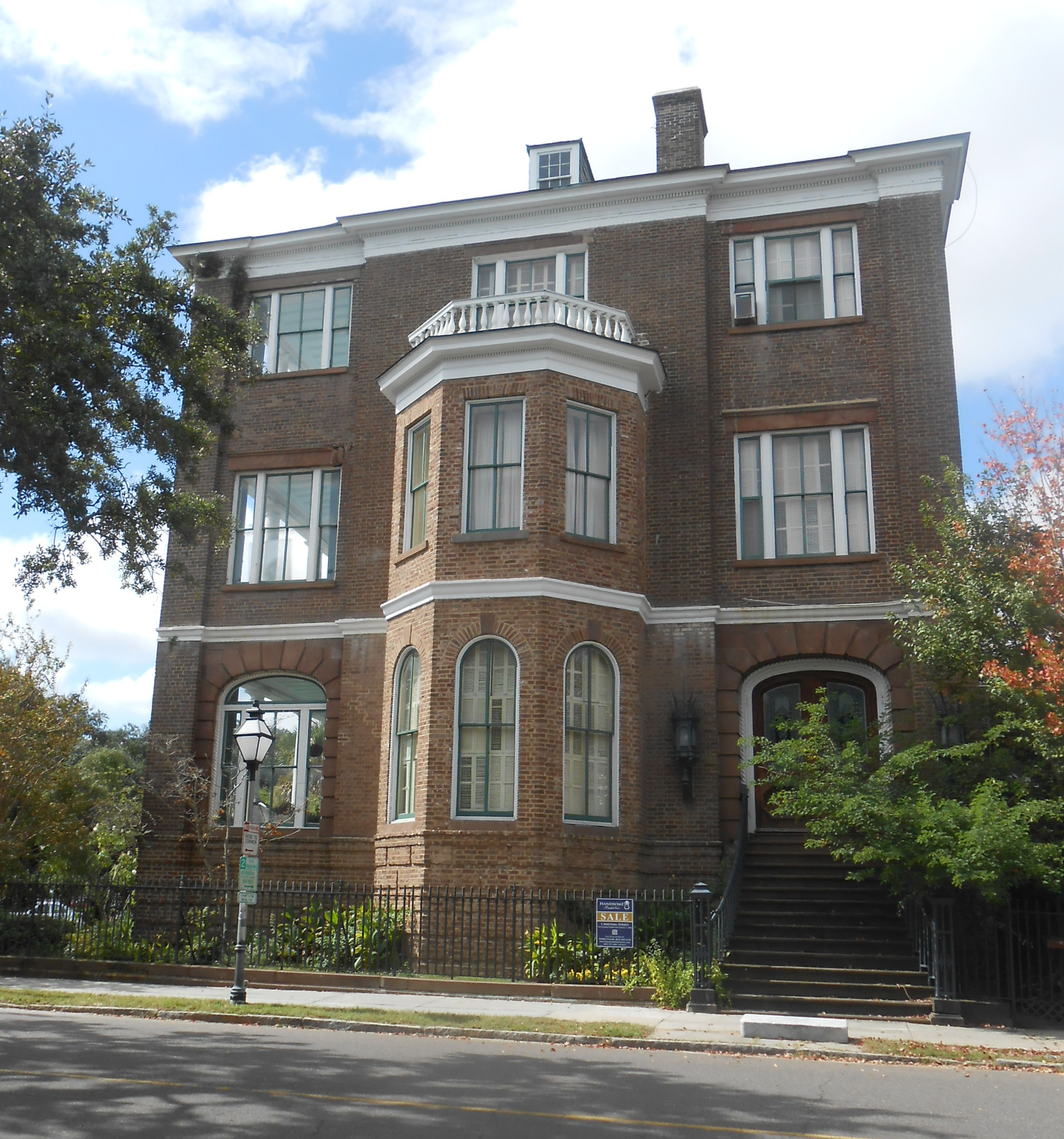
Williams Middleton acquired a fine house at 1 Meeting St., Charleston, South Carolina in 1855.

When his father was appointed United States Minister to Russia in the 1820s, Middleton served as secretary for the American legation.

Williams inherited Middleton Place in 1846 and he pursued the family's interest in rice culture, carried out agricultural experiments, and further enhanced the gardens with the introduction of azaleas. In addition to Middleton Place, Williams Middleton made his home in town at 1 Meeting St., a house he owned between 1855 and 1870.

In 1860, Williams and an older brother signed South Carolina's Ordinance of Secession that removed the state from the Union, leading to the Civil War. Only days after the fall of Charleston in 1865, a detachment of Union soldiers from New York occupied Middleton Place. On February 22, 1865, the main house and flanking buildings were ransacked and burned. At the close of the war, with financial help from his sister, Eliza Izard Middleton Fisher of Philadelphia, and with a small income from phosphate mining, timber and lumber sales, Williams managed to hold on to the family plantation. He was able to repair the South Flanker sufficiently to make it the post-Civil War family home.

== Personal life ==
In 1849, Middleton was married to Susan Pringle Smith (1822–1900), a daughter of Robert Smith and Elizabeth Mary (née Pringle) Smith. Together, they had two children:

- Elizabeth Smith "Lilly" Middleton (1849–1915), who married Julius Henry Heyward.
- Henry "Hal" Middleton (1851–1932).

Williams died on August 23, 1883, in Greenville. In 1886, an earthquake leveled what remained of the Main House and the North Flanker, while the restored South Flanker survived.
