= Charlotte Collins =

British literary translator

- Born: Cambridge
- Occupation: Literary translator

Charlotte Collins is a British literary translator of contemporary literature and drama from German.

== Career ==
Collins studied English literature at Christ's College, Cambridge, then trained in acting at The Poor School, London. She worked as an actor and radio journalist in the UK and Germany before becoming a translator. She was Co-Chair of the Translators Association from 2017 to 2020, and is the creator of the Translators Association - 60 Years of Classic Translation series.

== Awards and honours ==
- 2013 ITI Übersetzerwerkstatt, Berlin and Mühlheim
- 2017 Goethe-Institut Helen and Kurt Wolff Translator's Prize for A Whole Life by Robert Seethaler
- 2020 Warwick Prize for Women in Translation for The Eighth Life by Nino Haratischvili (with Ruth Martin)
- A Whole Life by Robert Seethaler shortlisted for the Man Booker International Prize (2016) and the International DUBLIN Literary Award (2017). Longlisted for the ALTA National Translation Award (2017).
- Longlisted with co-translator Ruth Martin for the International Booker Prize (2020) and the International DUBLIN (2021) for The Eighth Life: for Brilka by Nino Haratischwili

== Translations ==
- 2015 – A Whole Life by Robert Seethaler (Picador)
- 2016 – The Tobacconist by Robert Seethaler (House of Anansi Press/Picador)
- 2018 – The End of Loneliness by Benedict Wells (Sceptre)
- 2018 – Homeland by Walter Kempowski (Granta)
- 2019 – The Club by Takis Würger (Grove Atlantic)
- 2019 – The Eighth Life by Nino Haratischwili, co-translated with Ruth Martin (Scribe UK)
- 2020 – Olga by Bernhard Schlink (Weidenfeld & Nicolson)
- 2021 – The Field by Robert Seethaler (Picador)
- 2021 – Refugee: A Memoir by Emmanuel Mbolela (Farrar, Straus & Giroux)

== YA novels ==
Collins is the author of two bilingual novels for children/young adults:

- Save Green Farm! – Rettet Green Farm! (Langenscheidt Verlag, 2007. Ill. Anette Kannenberg)
- Boarding School Blues – Liebesfrust im Internat (Langenscheidt Verlag, 2008)
