= Governor Middleton =

Governor Middleton may refer to:

- Arthur Middleton (1681–1737), Acting Governor of the Province of South Carolina from 1725 to 1730
- John Middleton (administrator) (1870–1954), Governor of the Falkland Islands from 1920 to 1927, Governor of The Gambia from 1927 to 1928, and Dominion Governor of Newfoundland from 1928 to 1932
- John Middleton, 1st Earl of Middleton (1608–1674), Governor of English Tangier from 1667 to 1674
