= Schirach family =

Noble family of Upper Lusatian origin

Schirach/Šěrach
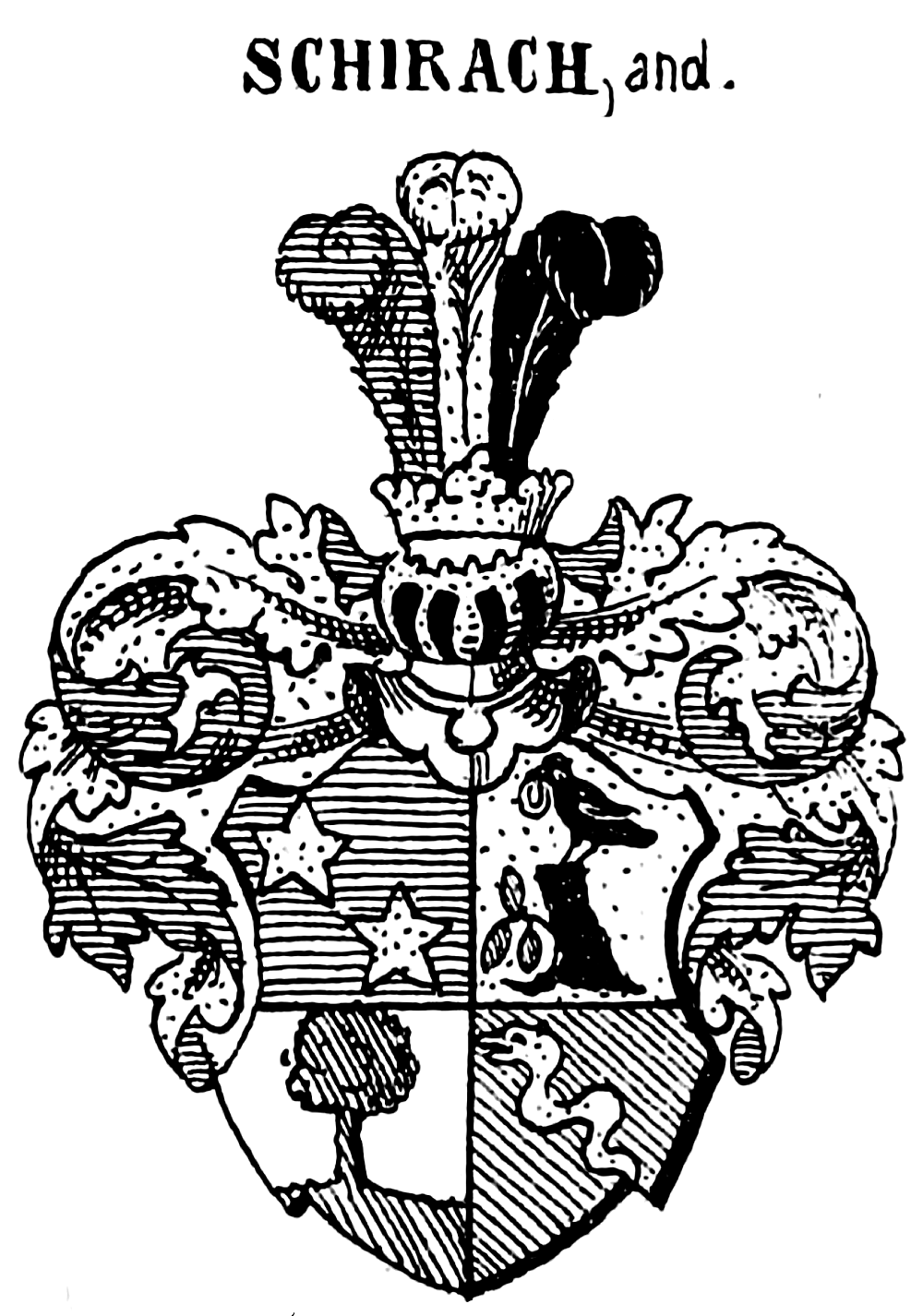
- Schirach coat of arms
- Current region: Germany, United States
- Origin: Lusatia
- Distinctions: Ennobled on 17 May 1776

The Schirach family or Šěrach is a German noble family of Sorbian (i.e. West Slavic) origin. Many family members were noted as theologians, lawyers, historians, writers and artists from the 17th century, and several family members have also been noted for their efforts to preserve the Sorbian language. The family was raised to the hereditary Austrian nobility in 1776. Family members are resident in Germany and, since the 19th century, the United States.

== History ==
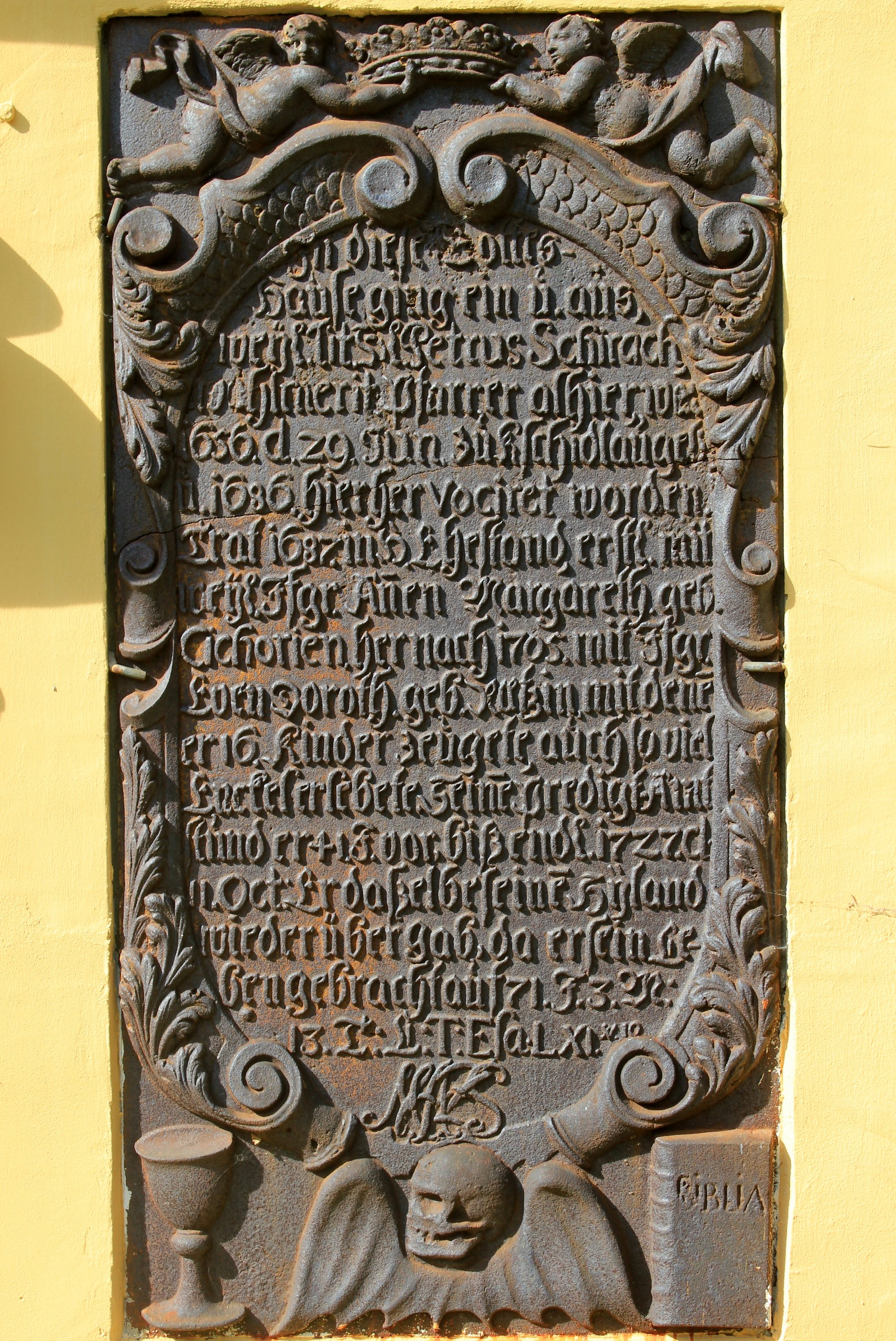
Memorial plate for the theologian and parish priest Peter Schirach (Pětr Šěrach) (1656–1727) in Kreba

The name Šěrach is assumed to be derived from the Sorbian word šěrak, meaning "greybeard" or "greyhead," in the sense of "old man" or possibly "wise man." Schirach is a Germanized spelling.

The family's earliest known ancestor George Schirag was a farmer in Schiedel near Kamenz, and is mentioned in 1485. One of his descendants, Peter Schirach (Pětr Šěrach) (1656–1727) became a theologian and parish priest in Kreba (Chrjebja). He had three sons who also became theologians, among them Christian Gottlob Schirach (Křesćan Bohuchwał Šěrach) (1709–1776), who was parish priest in Holzkirch and Tiefenfurth.

Christian Gottlob Schirach was the father of Gottlob Benedikt von Schirach (Bohuchwał Benedikt ze Šěrach) (1743–1804), a noted historian, Professor of Philosophy, publisher of the Political Journal (Politisches Journal) and later a diplomat in Danish service, who was ennobled in the Habsburg monarchy on 17 May 1776. His son Karl Benedikt von Schirach (1790–1864) was a lawyer and writer in Germany, before he emigrated to the United States in 1855. His son Karl Friedrich von Schirach (1842–1917) was a major in the US Army, fought in the American Civil War on the Union side and was an honour guard at President Abraham Lincoln's funeral in 1865. Karl Friedrich von Schirach married Elisabeth Baily Norris, a member of a prominent Philadelphia family. She was the daughter of Richard Norris of Norris Locomotive Works.

They had several children including composer Friedrich Wilhelm von Schirach and theatre director Carl Baily Norris von Schirach (1873–1948). Carl von Schirach was born in Wiesbaden, but was an American citizen until joining the Prussian Army. He left the army in 1908 to become leader of the Weimar Court Theatre. He married Emma Middleton Lynah Tillou (1872–1944), who also belonged to a prominent Philadelphia family. Her great-grandfather was John Parker, a state senator for South Carolina who served as delegate to the Congress of the Confederation. Her great-great-grandfather was Henry Middleton, who served as president of the First Continental Congress.

Carl von Schirach and Emma Tillou had four children, including opera singer Rosalind von Schirach and Nazi war criminal Baldur Benedikt von Schirach. Emma burned to death on 16 July 1944 when a plane crashed into her house in Wiesbaden and she attempted to rescue her dog.

Baldur was leader of the Hitler Youth until 1940 and was married to Henriette von Schirach. Henriette von Schirach was one of the few people known to have challenged the persecution of Jews to Hitler personally, after which the couple fell into disfavour in the Nazi leadership. They were the parents of artist Angelika Benedikta von Schirach (born 1933), lawyer Klaus von Schirach (born 1935), Munich businessman Robert Benedict Wolf von Schirach (1938–1980), and sinologist Richard von Schirach (1942–2023).

Robert von Schirach was the father of novelist Norris von Schirach (born 1963) and the bestselling crime writer Ferdinand von Schirach (born 1964). Richard von Schirach is the father of the writer and philosopher Ariadne von Schirach (born 1978) and of the novelist Benedict Wells (born Benedict von Schirach 1984).

In the 18th century, family members took an active interest in preservation of the Sorbian language, the Slavic language native to the people the family belonged to, which is closely related to Polish and Czech. One family member, Karl Gottlob Schirach (Korla Bohuchwał Šěrach) (1764–1836), published the first magazine in the Sorbian language, Měsačne pismo k rozwučenju a wokřewjenju.

== Literature ==
- Gothaisches Genealogisches Taschenbuch, B, 1907
- Genealogisches Handbuch des Adels, Adelige Häuser B, Vol. XIV, pp. 460f., Vol 78 (Gesamtreihe), C. A. Starke Verlag, Limburg (Lahn) 1981, ISSN 0435-2408.
- Genealogisches Handbuch des Adels, Adelslexikon Band XII, Vol. 125 (Gesamtreihe), C. A. Starke Verlag, Limburg (Lahn), 2001, ISSN 0435-2408.
- Kurzer Entwurf einer Oberlausitz-wendischen Kirchenhistorie, Budissin, 1767.
- Hermann Konrad Eggers, Die Schirach und von Schirach, in: Vierteljahresschrift für Heraldik, Sphragistik und Genealogie Nr. 7 (1879), Berlin
- Max von Schirach, Geschichte der Familie von Schirach, Berlin 1939.
- Gottlieb Friedrich Otto, Lexikon der seit dem 15. Jahrhunderte verstorbenen und jetzt lebenden oberlausitzischen Schriftsteller und Künstler, Görlitz 1800–03. ND Hildesheim 1983
- Jan Brankačk/Frido Mětšk, Geschichte der Sorben, Vol. 1, Von den Anfängen bis 1789, VEB Domowina Bautzen, 1977
- Deutsche Biographische Enzyklopädie [published by W.Killy & R.Vierhaus] vol.8. Darmstadt 1998
- Rainer Haas (2003). "Adam Gottlob Schirach". In Bautz, Traugott (ed.). Biographisch-Bibliographisches Kirchenlexikon (BBKL) (in German). Vol. 21. Nordhausen: Bautz. cols. 1356–1360. ISBN 3-88309-110-3.
- Michael H. Kater, https://books.google.com/books?id=v9xJPe0QchcC&pg=PA17&lpg=PA17 Hitler Youth. Cambridge: Harvard University Press, 2004. ISBN 978-0-674-01496-1, ISBN 978-0-674-01991-1. S. 17. (Zur Genealogie von Karl Benedict von Schirach bis Baldur von Schirach)
