= Edward Middleton =

American rear admiral (1810–1883)

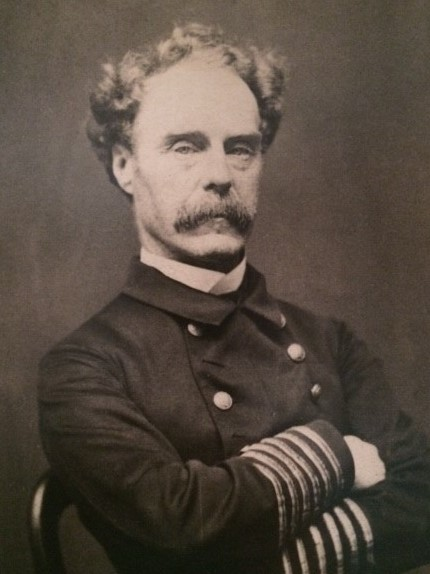
- Edward Middleton family photo as Captain 1864
- Born: December 11, 1810; Charleston, South Carolina
- Died: April 27, 1883 (aged 72); Washington, DC
- Resting place: Brooklyn, New York
- Known for: Admiral in the Navy
- Spouse: Ellida Juell Davison
- Parent(s): Henry Middleton; Mary Helen Hering
- Relatives: Arthur Middleton (grandfather)

Edward Middleton (December 11, 1810, Charleston, South Carolina – April 27, 1883, Washington, D.C.) of the South Carolina Middleton family was a U.S. Navy rear admiral most known for his service defending the United States Pacific borders during the Civil War.

== Early life ==
Middleton was born on December 11, 1810, in Charleston, South Carolina He was the son of Mary Helen Hering (1772–1850) and Henry Middleton (1770–1846). His family played important roles in the history of the United States during the colonial revolution and civil war periods. His great grandfather, Henry Middleton, was President of the Continental Congress. His grandfather, Arthur Middleton, was one of the signers of the Declaration of Independence. His father, Henry Middleton, was governor of South Carolina and ambassador to Russia from 1820 to 1830. The remains of the family home and gardens still exist on the banks of the Ashley river in South Carolina at Middleton Place.

He was descended from an English family, the first of whom also named Edward Middleton came to America in 1678. Edward Middleton's (1810–1883) mother was Mary Helen Hering.

== Career ==
After being educated in England and France, Edward joined his father and mother in Russia in 1827. He then served six months with the Admiral of the Russian Fleet, Pyotr Ivanovich Ricord, on board his ship. Edward returned to the United States after entering the Navy as a midshipman on the frigate USS Java in the Mediterranean, July 1, 1828.

From that time, he was promoted and reassigned several times including as First Lieutenant and Executive Officer of the USS Decatur. During the war of 1851–1855 he fought against Indians of the various tribes of Washington and Oregon Territories. He fought in the Battle of Seattle, January 26, 1856. He resisted solicitations to join the Confederacy choosing to stay with the Union in the Pacific West citing obligations to the Navy and Government. This decision strained family relationships and on February 22, 1865, in his absence Middleton Place was burned to the ground by a detachment of the New York volunteer regiment.

After the war, he was appointed on special duty in New York, where he married Ellida, the daughter of Edward Davison. In October 1866, he was appointed Executive Officer of the Mare Island Naval Shipyard. He went on to commanded the USS Pensacola and then the steam sloop USS Lackawanna. His last command was Pensacola Navy Yard before he retired from active service at sixty-two.

On August 15, 1876, the U.S. Congress passed a special act as a recognition of Middleton's services, and, in compliance with this act, he was promoted to the grade of Rear-Admiral on the retired list.

== Personal life ==
Middleton was married to Ellida Juell Davison (1839–1910). Together, they were the parents of:

- Emeline Middleton (1869–1948), who married Edgar Mora Davison (d. 1927), a banker with August Belmont & Co. and a director of the Museum of the City of New York.
- Arthur E. H. Middleton (1872–1919).

Middleton died on April 27, 1883, in Washington, D.C. His wife was quoted in his obituary as saying, "upon no subject was he uninformed and his erudition was remarkable, and as a linguist he was one of the finest in the country". He was buried at Green-Wood Cemetery in Brooklyn, New York.

=== Descendants ===
His granddaughter was Emeline Ellida Davison (d. 1998), who was married to John Morse Rea. Another granddaughter was Nancy R. Middleton, who married Wiliam Saxton Myers.
