= John Parker (Continental Congress) =

American politician

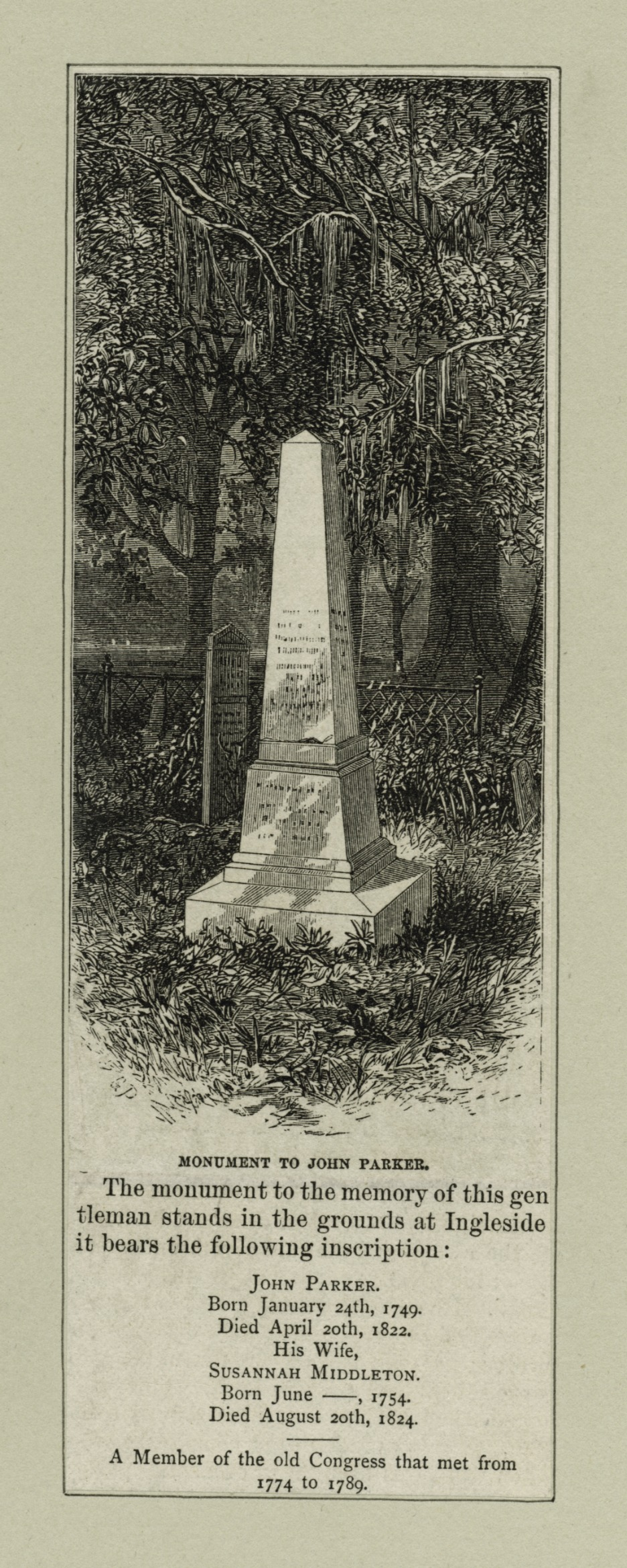
Monument to John Parker

John Parker (June 24, 1759 – April 20, 1832) was an American planter of the Hayes Plantation and lawyer from Charleston, South Carolina. He served as a delegate for South Carolina to the Congress of the Confederation from 1786 to 1788.

== Biography ==
John Parker was born to John Parker III (c. 1736-13 Feb 1802) and Mary Daniel (30 November 1736-22 February 1807. John and his brothers, District Attorney Thomas Parker, Thomas Ferguson and William McKenzie were admitted to the Bar. John received the Bar in South Carolina 1785 and became a prominent and well-known Attorney's for the state of South Carolina. On Christmas Eve 1786 he married Susannah Middleton (6 January 1760 – 20 August 1834), daughter of Henry Middleton and sister of Arthur Middleton. Their children included Emma Angeline, who married Lt. Col. James Lynah, and had a daughter Emma Middleton Tillou, whose daughter also called Emma Middleton Tillou married Carl von Schirach.

He was educated in Charleston and England, and graduated from the Middle Temple, London. He had returned to South Carolina by 1778, and briefly served in the Charleston militia. He settled on his rice plantation, and engaged in planting. He was admitted to the bar in 1785 and practiced in Charleston. He served in the Congress of the Confederation from 1786 to 1788.

John Parker was buried on the Hayes Plantation, later known as the Ingleside Plantation, in St. James' Parish, Goose Creek, near Charleston.
