= The End of Loneliness =

2016 novel by Benedict Wells

- First edition (in German)
- Author: Benedict Wells
- Original title: Vom Ende der Einsamkeit
- Translator: Charlotte Collins
- Language: German
- Publisher: Diogenes Verlag
- Publication date: 2016
- Publication place: Germany
- English publication date: 2018
- Media type: Print
- Pages: 463 pp
- ISBN: 978-3-257-06958-7
- OCLC: 1240338612
- Preceded by: Fast genial (Almost Ingenious)
- Followed by: Die Wahrheit über das Lügen (The Truth About Lying)

The End of Loneliness (Vom Ende der Einsamkeit) is a 2016 German novel by Benedict Wells. It was published in February 2016 by Diogenes Verlag. It remained on the German bestseller list for more than 80 weeks. The English version was translated by Charlotte Collins and published in 2018 by Sceptre. It was Wells' first book to be translated into English.

== Plot ==
Jules Moreau's parents are killed in a car crash. He is sent to boarding school with his brother Marty and sister Liz. He befriends Alva, a fellow pupil. Marty's friend Toni pursues Liz, unsuccessfully. Jules desires Alva and is angered when he finds her having sex with another man.

Years later, he gets in touch with Alva and they meet. Alva has married A.N. Romanov, an author many years her senior. They invite Jules to stay with them in Switzerland. The elderly Romanov is becoming forgetful. He keeps guns in the cellar, and recalls his father's suicide. Jules and Romanov work on their novels in the same room. Jules and Alva begin an affair. Romanov declares his intention to kill himself before he loses his mind, and asks Jules to help him. Jules later finds Romanov in the cellar, and places a gun in his hand, then leaves before Romanov kills himself.

Alva and Jules have twins. Jules finishes Romanov's last novel. Alva is diagnosed with leukemia. She is cured by chemotherapy, but it recurs. Alva dies. Jules crashes his motorcycle.

Marty and his wife Elena cannot have children. Liz has had a string of lovers, but never married. She sleeps with Toni because she wants a child, but stops after she becomes pregnant.

== Reception ==
Kirkus Reviews wrote "The book's earnestness weighs it down from time to time, but overall Wells has written a tender, affecting novel, one that packs a lot into a slender frame." Publishers Weekly described it as "satisfying... in prose both beautiful and sparse enough to cut clearly to the question at the novel's heart: how one copes with loss that isn't—or doesn't have to be—permanent." Deutsche Welle called it "affecting and accomplished".

A review in The Philadelphia Inquirer described it as "lovingly translated"; however, a review in the Irish Times found the translation "stilted".

Vogue magazine named it one of the best novels of 2019.

== Awards ==
The book was awarded the 2016 European Union Prize for Literature. The jury said "Wells has created a novel whose strength lies in the characters who, despite all their sadness, exude a [...] warmth. [...] This success is based on Wells' extraordinary imagination, a gift rarely encountered these days."

It was awarded the Ravensburger Verlag Foundation book prize. The jury described it as "a clever work about loss and preservation, about slow self-discovery, about the power of the past, comforting regardless of its sadness, sometimes even funny."

It was longlisted for the Dublin Literary Award. It was awarded the 2018 Euregio student literature prize. It was voted "Favorite Book of the Independent Book Trade" in 2016.
