= Middleton Place =

- U.S. National Register of Historic Places
- U.S. National Historic Landmark District
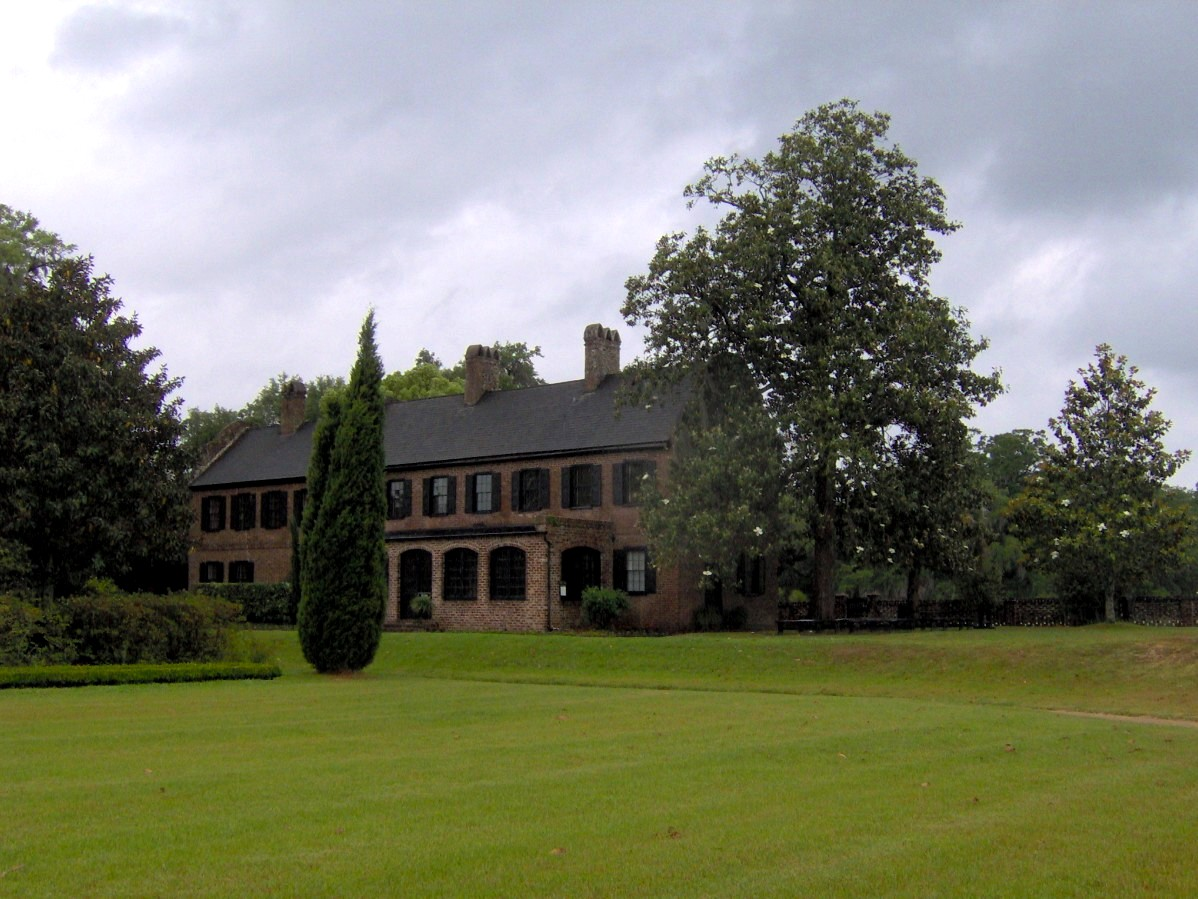
- The house museum, initially a guest wing

- Location within South Carolina Location within the United States
- Nearest city: Summerville, South Carolina - Charleston, South Carolina
- Coordinates: 32.89982°N 80.13654°W
- Area: 110 acres (45 ha)
- Built: c.1738—1755
- Architectural style: Colonial
- NRHP reference No.: 71000770

Significant dates
- Added to NRHP: May 6, 1971
- Designated NHLD: November 11, 1971

Middleton Place is a plantation in Dorchester County, along the banks of the Ashley River west of the Ashley and about 15 miles (24 km) northwest of downtown Charleston, in the U.S. state of South Carolina. Built in several phases during the 18th and 19th centuries, the plantation was the primary residence of several generations of the Middleton family, many of whom played prominent roles in the colonial and antebellum history of South Carolina. The plantation, now a National Historic Landmark District, is used as a museum, and is home to the oldest landscaped gardens in the United States.

John Williams, an early South Carolina planter, probably began building Middleton Place in the late 1730s. His son-in-law Henry Middleton (1717–1784), who later served as President of the First Continental Congress, completed the house's main section and its north and south flankers, and began work on the elaborate gardens. Middleton's son, Founding Father Arthur Middleton (1742–1787), a signer of the Declaration of Independence, was born at Middleton Place, and lived at the plantation during the last years of his life. Arthur Middleton's son and grandson, Henry Middleton (1770—1846) and Williams Middleton (1809–1883), oversaw Middleton Place's transition from a country residence to a more active rice plantation. In 1865, toward the end of the American Civil War, Union soldiers burned most of the house, leaving only the south wing and gutted walls of the north wing and main house. The 1886 Charleston earthquake toppled the walls of the main house and north wing.

The restoration of Middleton Place began in 1916 when Middleton descendant John Julius Pringle Smith (1887–1969) and his wife Heningham began several decades' work of meticulously rebuilding the plantation's gardens. They had New York architect Bancel LaFarge design a stableyard complex of barn, stable, work buildings, and cottages; the buildings were constructed of brick salvaged from the ruined main house. In the early 1970s, approximately 110 acres (45 ha) of the 7,000-acre (2,800 ha) plantation—including the south flanker, the gardens, and several outbuildings—were placed on the National Register of Historic Places. During the same period the Middleton descendants transferred ownership of the historic district to the non-profit Middleton Place Foundation, which presently maintains the site.

== Location ==
Middleton Place is set on the southwest bank of the Ashley River. At this point, the southward-flowing river bends sharply to the east en route to its mouth at Charleston Harbor about 15 miles (24 km) downstream. A small northeastward-flowing creek, which has been dammed to form the plantation's rice mill pond, empties into the Ashley at this eastward bend, and forms the historic district's southern boundary. Ashley River Road (part of South Carolina Highway 61), which connects Middleton Place to Charleston to the southeast and the Legend Oaks area to the northwest, forms the historic district's western boundary. The plantation's south flanker and residence area sit atop a hill that rises just over 20 feet (6.1 m) above the river, allowing an unobstructed view of the river for nearly a mile downstream.

== History ==
=== Colonial and Revolutionary period ===
Middleton Place was established in the 1730s by early South Carolina planter John Williams. He likely began construction on the main block of the house, selecting the site for its strategic view of the Ashley River. After Williams' death, the plantation became part of the dowry of his daughter, Mary Williams. In 1741, Mary Williams married Henry Middleton, whose name was subsequently applied to the plantation. Middleton's father had immigrated from Barbados and had established a plantation in the area which is now part of the cities of Goose Creek and North Charleston. Henry's older brother, William, built the Crowfield plantation in the 1730s, but eventually moved to England, leaving Henry in charge of the family's affairs in South Carolina. Henry continued acquiring land, eventually becoming one of South Carolina's wealthiest planters. At one point, he owned 20 plantations consisting of 50,000 acres (20,000 ha) and 800 slaves.

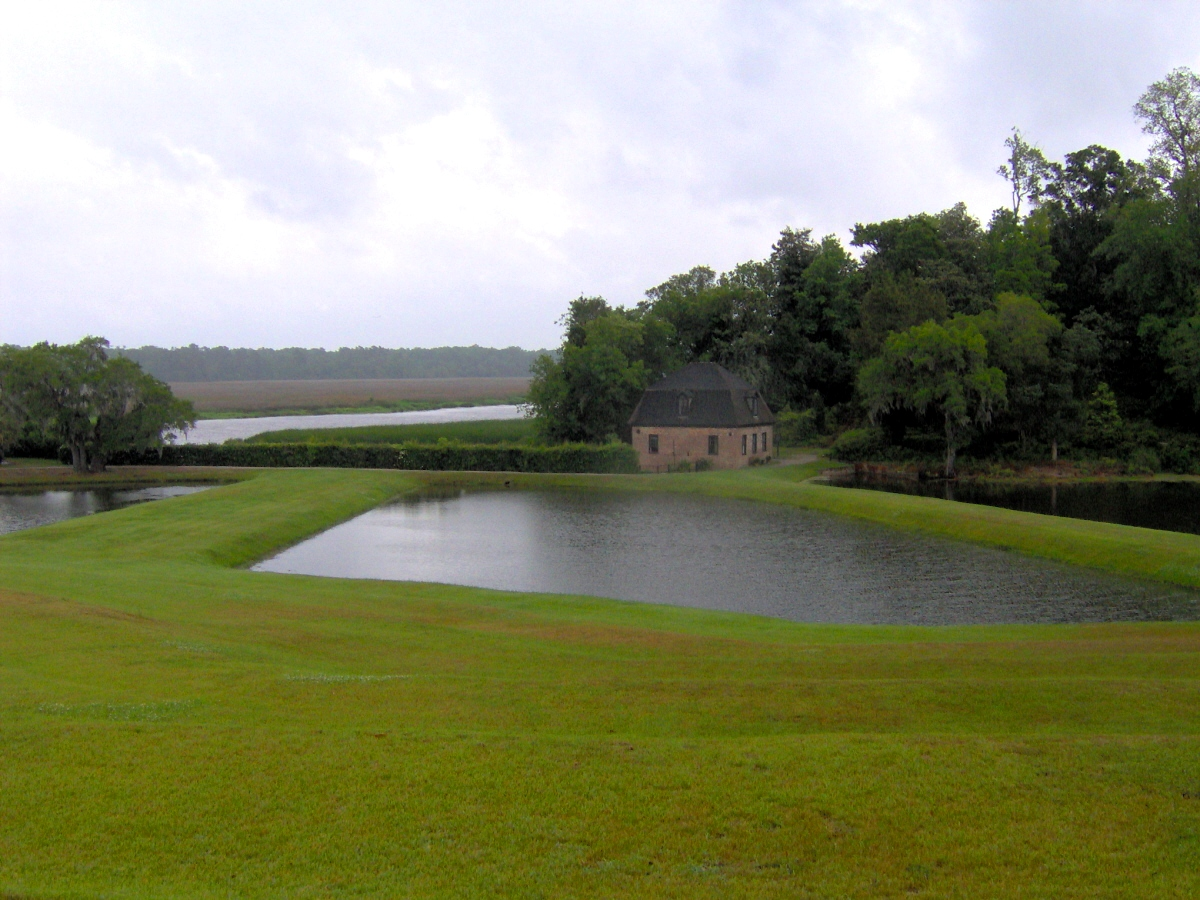
The south Butterfly Lake and Rice Mill, with the Ashley River in the distance

Henry likely planned Middleton Place as a country residence more than as an active rice plantation. The original main house, completed around 1741, was three stories tall, built of brick in Jacobean-style. In 1755, Middleton added two two-storey free-standing wings, or "flankers", to the north and south ends of the house. The free-standing north wing contained a library and ballroom, while the south wing was used as a guest house.

Middleton began work on the plantation's gardens in 1741. Determined to outshine his neighbors, who were laying out neat four-squared patterned parterres, Middleton employed an English gardener named Simms, of whom little is known. Rather than base his designs upon his own trip to England, Middleton and Simms derived their inspiration from the engraved plans in the popular garden book by Dezallier d'Argenville, translated into English as The Theory and Practice of Gardening. Middleton and Simms extended a main axis centered on the main block of the house, expressed as a gravel carriageway leading through a greensward to the first of six shaped turf terraces with bowed centers. At the level of the river a pair of lakes (the "Butterfly Lakes") were excavated on either side of a turf causeway prolonging the axis. With the river beyond, the lakes were flanked by more water, a stream dammed to the right to form the long narrow Rice Mill Pond, and a levee extended to the left to enclose floodable rice fields.

After Mary Middleton's death in 1761, Henry moved to a small house north of Charleston and gave Middleton Place to his son, Arthur. In 1776, at the outbreak of the American Revolution, Arthur signed the Declaration of Independence. Four years later, at the height of the war, the British landed several thousand troops at Charleston with plans to invade the southern colonies. In the ensuing Siege of Charleston, British troops ransacked Middleton Place, beheading many of the statues and looting the plantation's artwork and furniture. Arthur Middleton was captured and imprisoned until 1781. In 1783, the surrender terms that eliminated British troops from the Southern colonies were signed at Middleton.

=== Antebellum period ===
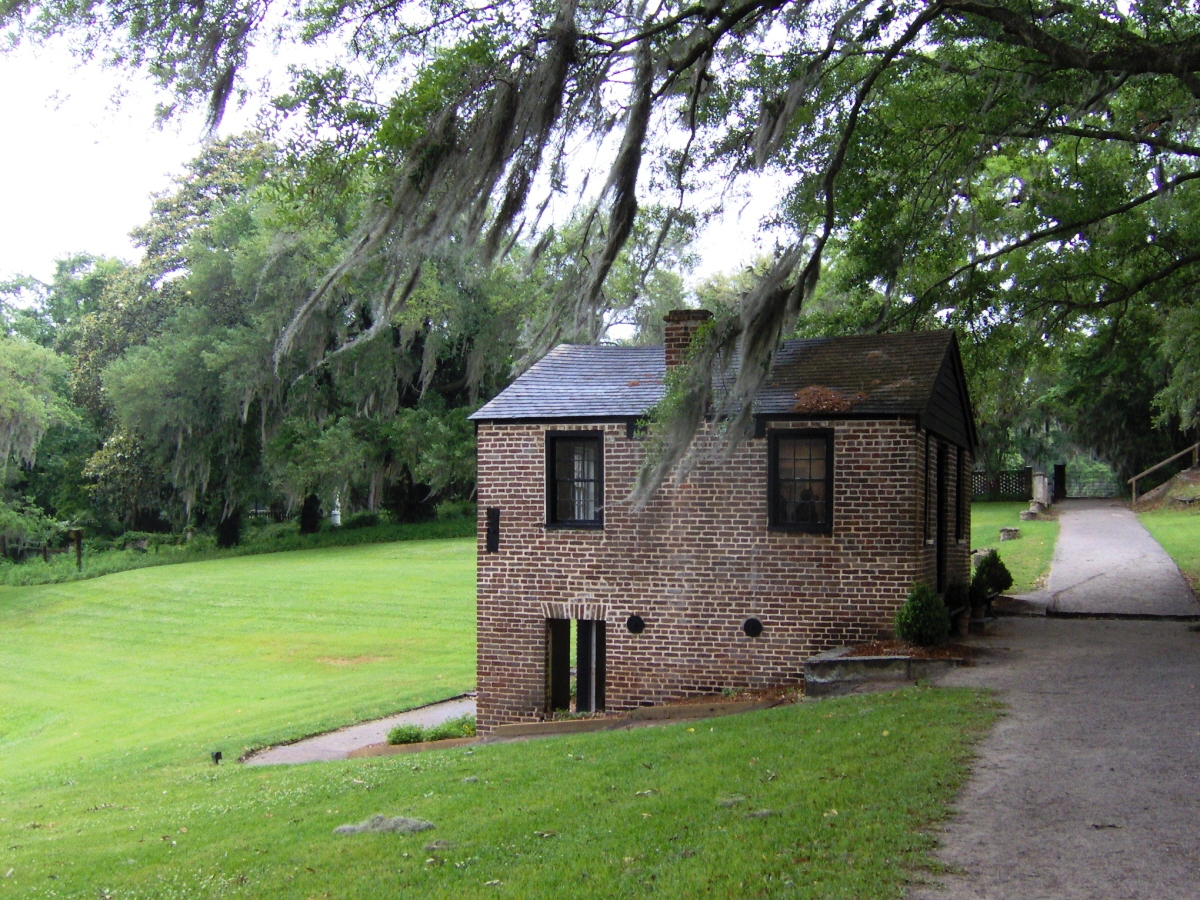
Middleton Place springhouse and chapel

Newly discovered records show that Middleton Place imported water buffalo from Constantinople in the late 18th century, the first in the United States. They were experimental draft animals, suited to the deep muck in which rice was grown. In the gardens, Arthur's son Henry Middleton's friendship with French botanist André Michaux resulted in the first camellias grown in an American garden, a house gift during Michaux's visit in 1786. Three of the four planted at the corners of the main parterre survive, grown to fifteen feet: One is Camellia japonica "reine des fleurs"; the other is an ancestor of the modern cultivar Charles Sprague Sargent. The second Henry Middleton expanded and enriched the gardens, introducing the garden's first Asiatic azalea (Rhododendron indica), and the crape myrtle ( Lagerstroemia indica), one of the oldest in America. He also filled greenhouses with exotics and imported plants and seeds to give antebellum Middleton Place something of the air of a botanical garden.

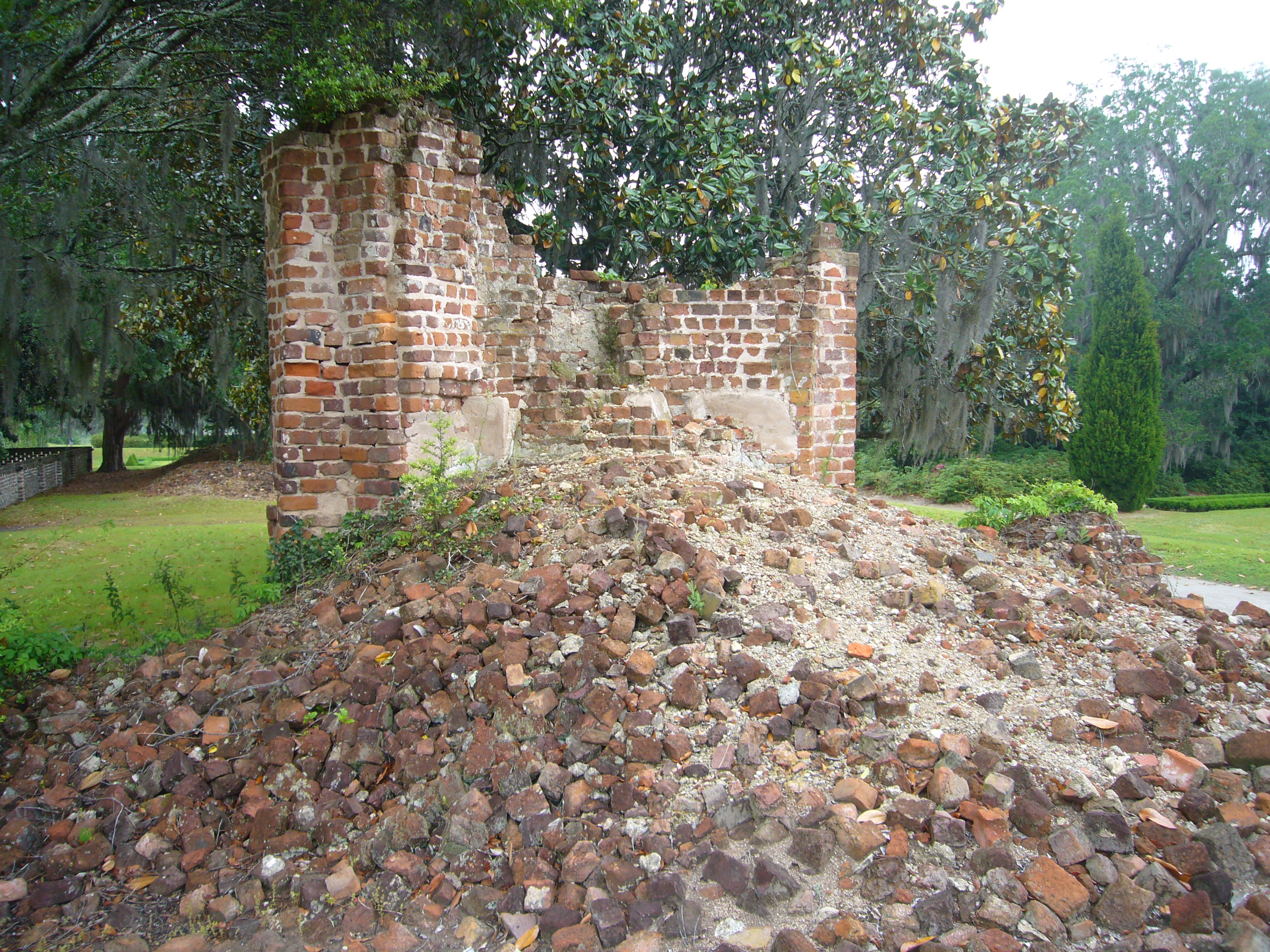
Ruins of the main house

Upon Henry Middleton's death in 1846, Middleton Place passed to his son, Williams Middleton. In 1860, Williams Middleton signed the South Carolina Ordinance of Secession, in which the state declared it was no longer part of the United States. South Carolina's actions led to the attack on Fort Sumter in April 1861, sparking the U.S. Civil War. In February 1865, near the end of the war, Union troops captured Middleton Place and burned the main house and north flanker, and part of the south flanker. The soldiers also killed and ate five of the water buffalo and stole six. These six later showed up in Central Park Zoo.

In 1868, Williams Middleton restored the roof to the south flanker at Middleton Place, and converted it to the main residence. He lacked the money for major restorations, however, and managed to obtain only limited success as a large-scale planter. After his death in 1883, Middleton Place passed to wife, Susan. Three years later, the Charleston earthquake toppled the walls of the main house and north flanker and further damaged the gardens. The gardens lay neglected for several decades afterwards.

=== Restoration ===
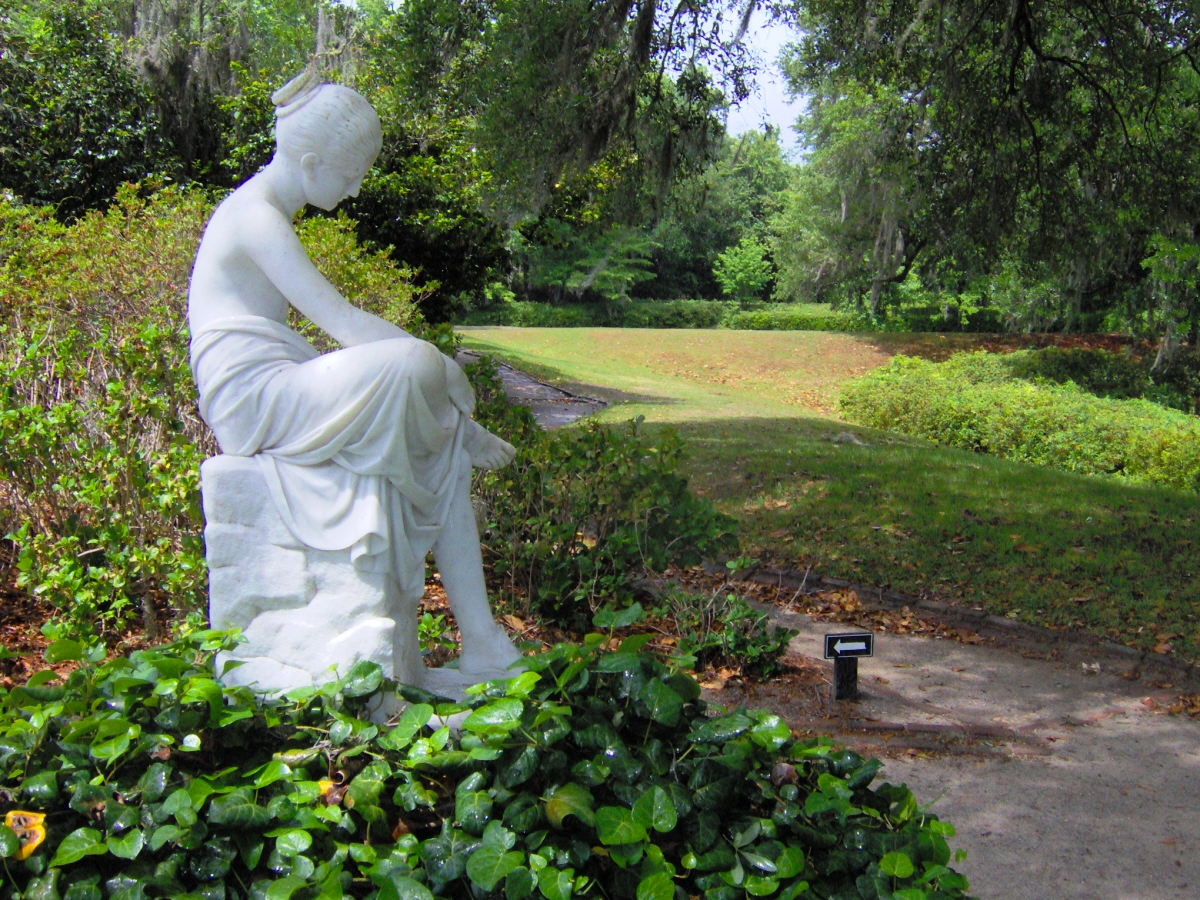
Statue amidst the north gardens at Middleton Place

Williams Middleton's daughter, Elizabeth, inherited Middleton Place in 1900, and made minor restorations. Upon her death in 1915, she left the plantation to her cousin, John Julius Pringle Smith (Smith was a great-great-great-grandson of Henry Middleton). Smith and his wife, Heningham, used Middleton Place as their winter residence. Determined to restore the gardens to their original splendor, the Smiths labored for several years, replanting and reworking the gardens. They opened the plantation's gardens to the public in the late 1920s. In 1941, the Garden Club of America called the Middleton Place gardens "the most interesting and important garden in the United States".

In the 1930s, the Smiths began restoring the house and outbuildings at Middleton Place to their late 18th-century appearance. In 1971, the plantation was added to the National Register of Historic Places and designated a National Historic Landmark District. Shortly thereafter the Middleton Place Foundation was established, with Smith's grandson Charles Duell acting as its first president. In recent years, the Middleton Place Foundation has carried out extensive research to document the thousands of African-American slaves once owned by the Middleton family.

== Middleton Place today ==
=== Layout ===
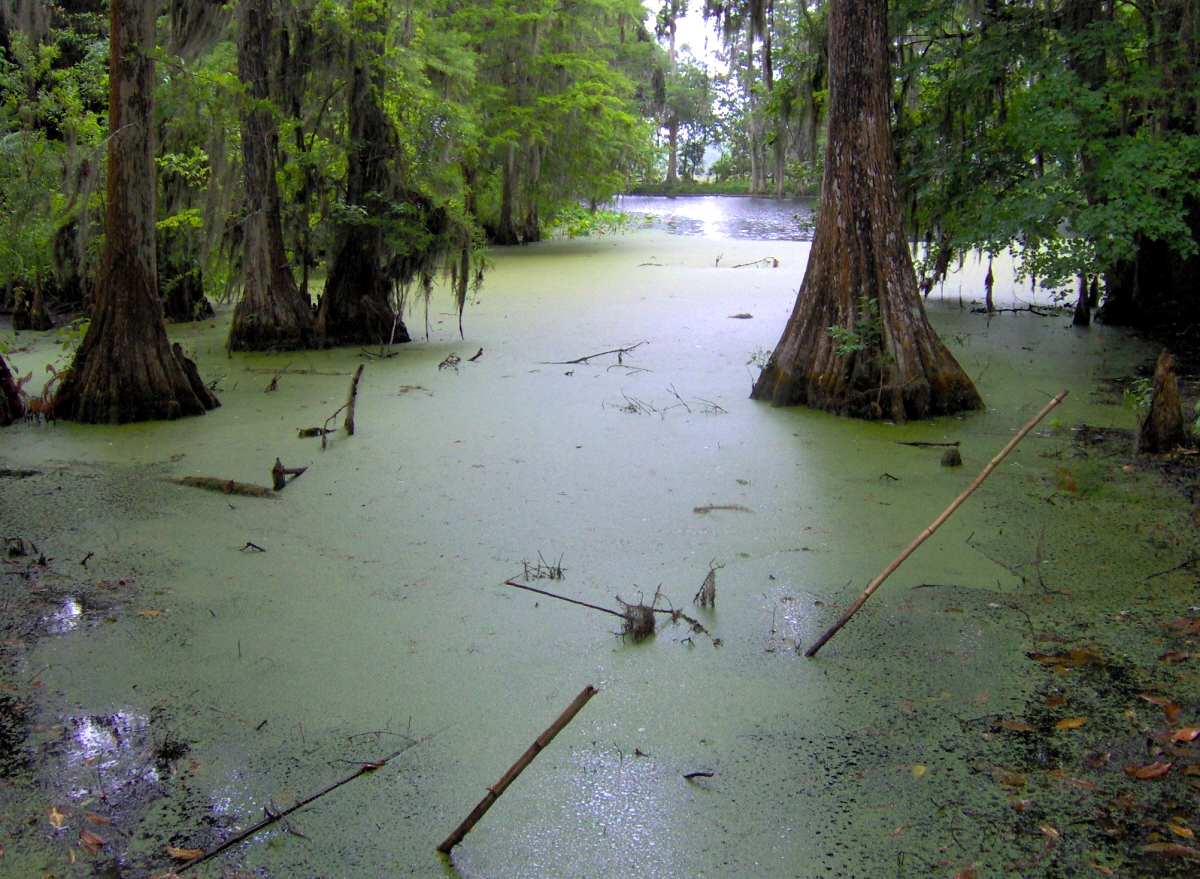
Swamp in the plantation's undeveloped northwest section

The original access to Middleton Place was a roadway that ran due east from Ashley River Road for approximately 1,000 feet (300 m) before terminating in a large loop. The main residence (now consisting of only the south flanker) lay at the east end of the loop, the stables (now part of a demonstration area) were at the south end of the loop, and the family burial grounds and main garden area were at the north end. The terraced gardens and butterfly ponds lay east of the main residence. The original roadway, the main gate of the original residence, and the levee separating the two Butterfly Lakes were all situated on a continuous east-west axis.

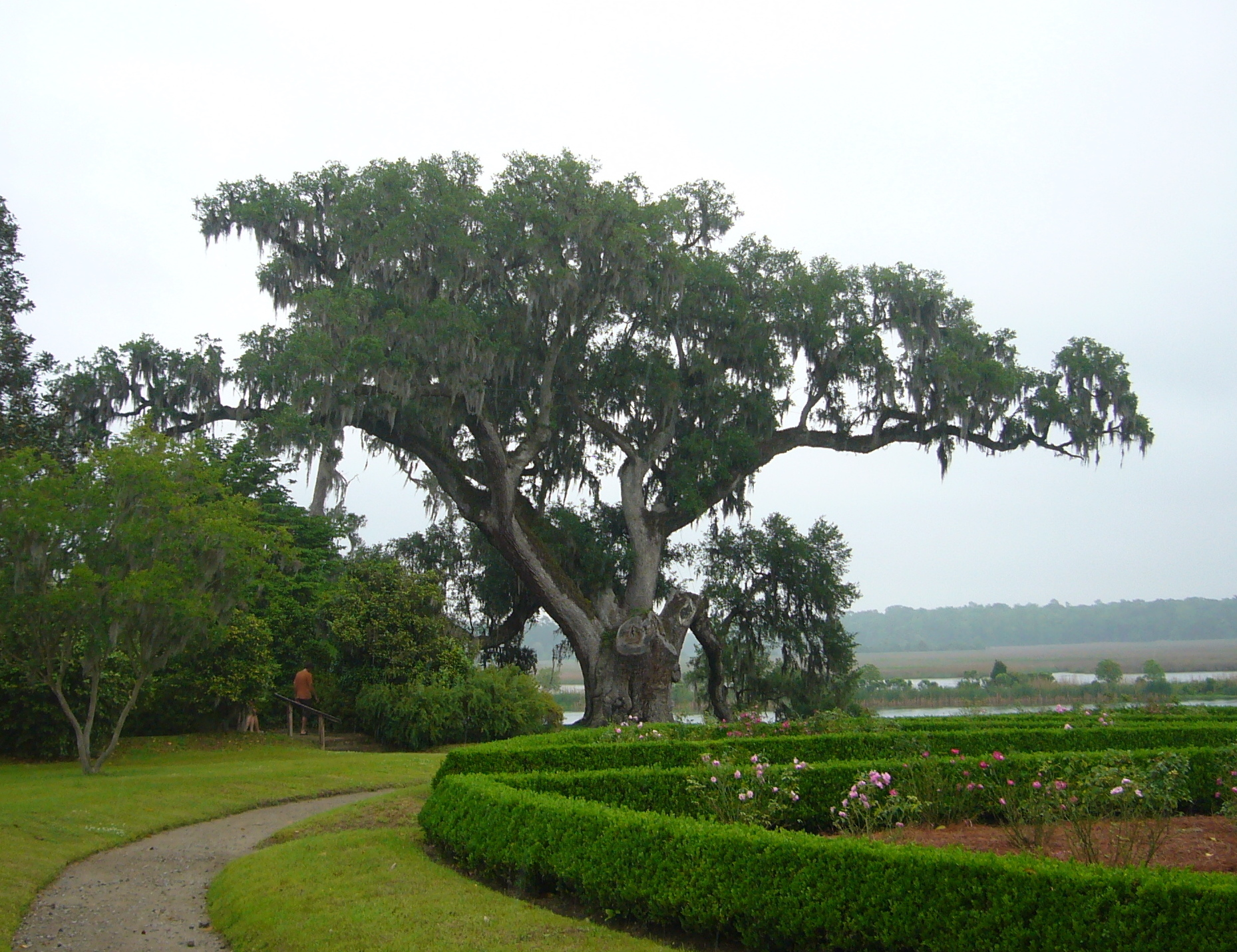
Middleton Oak, 2011

The northwest section of Middleton consists of a densely forested woodland which gives way to a marsh at the riverbank. This natural area is separated from the north gardens by an 800-foot (240 m) by 100-foot (30 m) rectangular pool (known as the Reflection Pool) on the west side of the gardens and a smaller less-defined pool (known as the Azalea Pool) on the north side. The north gardens are laid out in grid-like fashion with each surrounded by hedges and separated by walkways. On the east side of the gardens is a "spoked wheel" formation roughly 100 feet (30 m) in diameter. Perhaps the most notable feature of the gardens is the "Middleton Oak", or "Great Oak", a massive live oak tree with a trunk more than 10 feet (3.0 m) in diameter.

The east gardens stretch eastward from the main residence for approximately 200 feet (61 m) before descending in a series of terraces to the floodplain of the Ashley River. Two congruent ponds at the eastern base of the terraces resemble butterfly wings, and are thus known as the "Butterfly Lakes". Levees separate the ponds from the river to the north and from the mill pond to the south. A smaller 150-foot (46 m) by 150-foot (46 m) garden (subdivided into four still smaller gardens) lies between the north and east gardens.

The vast majority of Middleton's 6,000 acres is forest. In 2013, half of the property was dedicated to a carbon offset program, ensuring it will not be developed.

=== Middleton Place House (south flanker) ===
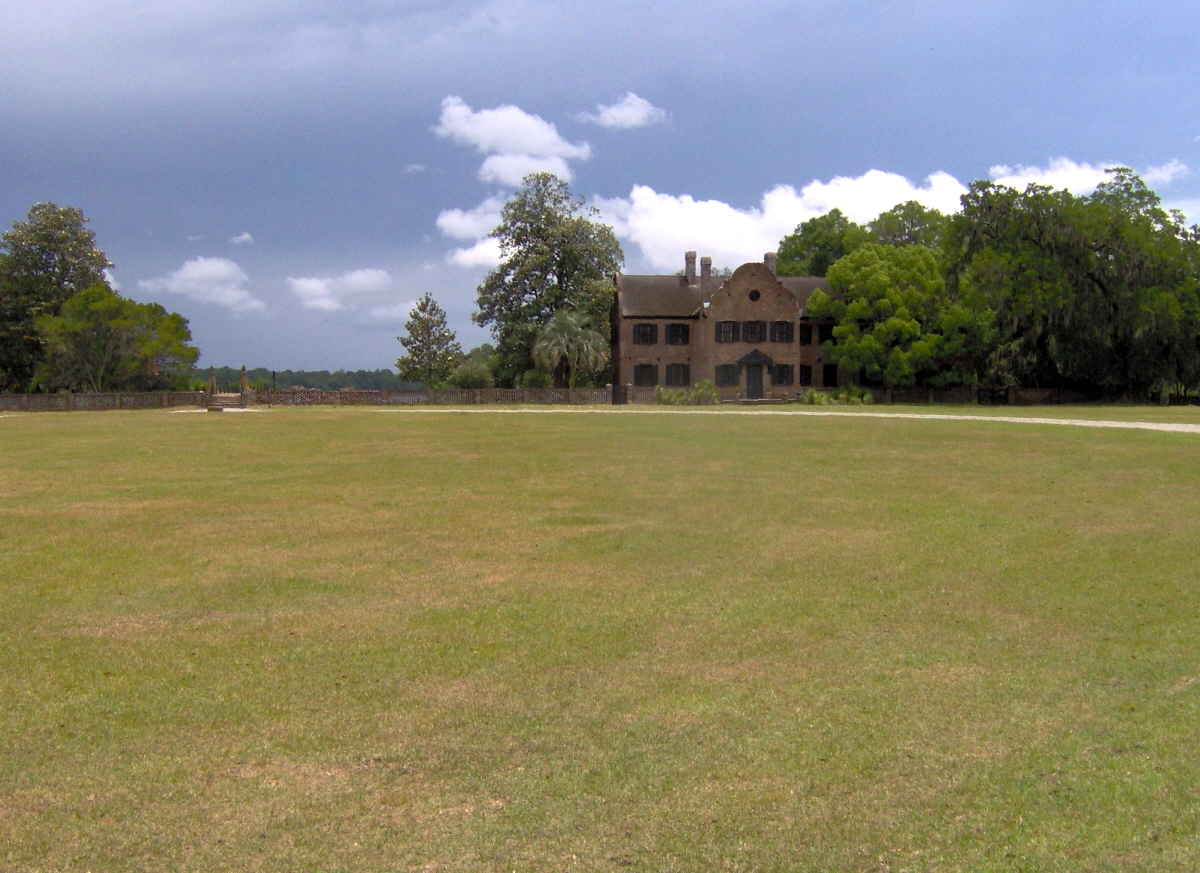
View toward south wing; the original main residence stood at the gap in the treeline

The Middleton Place House, formerly the south wing or south flanker, was built in 1755 by Henry Middleton (one stone of the house contains Middleton's initials and the year "1755"). The roof was added in 1868, after the original roof was destroyed when Union soldiers burned the property. The house is a two-story, 52-foot (16 m) by 20-foot (6.1 m) structure with a gabled roof and stepped and curvilinear gable ends. An 18-foot (5.5 m) by 28-foot (8.5 m) service wing was added to the south side of the house in the 1930s (the wing was built in the same 18th-century style as the house). The first floor of the house originally contained a parlor, living room, and dining room, while the second floor contained three bedrooms. The interior has been outfitted with original furniture.

=== Notable outbuildings ===
- The Middle Place rice mill— located immediately east of the Butterfly Lakes, where a natural east-flowing stream empties into the Ashley River. Williams Middleton built the mill in 1851 as he began more intensive planting at Middleton Place. The mill has undergone several alterations in modern times.
- The Middleton Place springhouse, located behind the south flanker, was built in the 18th century (springhouses were used for refrigeration). In 1850, the second story of the springhouse was converted into a chapel.
- Eliza's House is a freedman's residence built around 1870. The house is named after its last occupant, Eliza Leach (1891–1986).
- The Stableyard is a demonstration area that includes a barnyard and stable, both built in the 1930s.

== See also ==
- Drayton Hall
- Edmondston-Alston House
- Magnolia Plantation and Gardens
- McLeod Plantation
- List of botanical gardens in the United States
- List of National Historic Landmarks in South Carolina
- National Register of Historic Places listings in Dorchester County, South Carolina
- Ashley's Sack
