= Měsačne pismo k rozwučenju a wokřewjenju =

Magazine

Měsačne pismo k rozwučenju a wokřewjenju ("Monthly letter for education and entertainment") was the first printed magazine in the Sorbian language and was published in 1790. Because it was published without a governmental license, it had to cease publication after just one issue. Its two publishers, Jan Awgust Janka (1764–1833) and Korla Bohuchwał Šěrach (1764–1836; a member of the Schirach family), were inspired by the French Revolution, and wanted to educate their people, the Sorbs, in moral, religious, and scientific matters. The authorities banned the magazine to prevent "the Sorbian people from resisting their own government based on the model of the French."
