= Carl von Schirach =

German-American theatre director and Nazi (1873–1949)

Carl Baily Norris von Schirach (10 November 1873 – 11 July 1949) was a German-American theatre director and Nazi.

A member of the Schirach family, Schirach was born in Wiesbaden to American parents, one of German descent. His mother died soon afterwards. He gave up his US citizenship to join the First Baden Light Dragoon Regiment in Karlsruhe, and later the Guards Cuirassiers Regiment at Tempelhofer Feld in Berlin, retiring as cavalry captain (Rittmeister). His American wife Emma enjoyed Berlin, talking to Kaiser Wilhelm II in English at receptions.

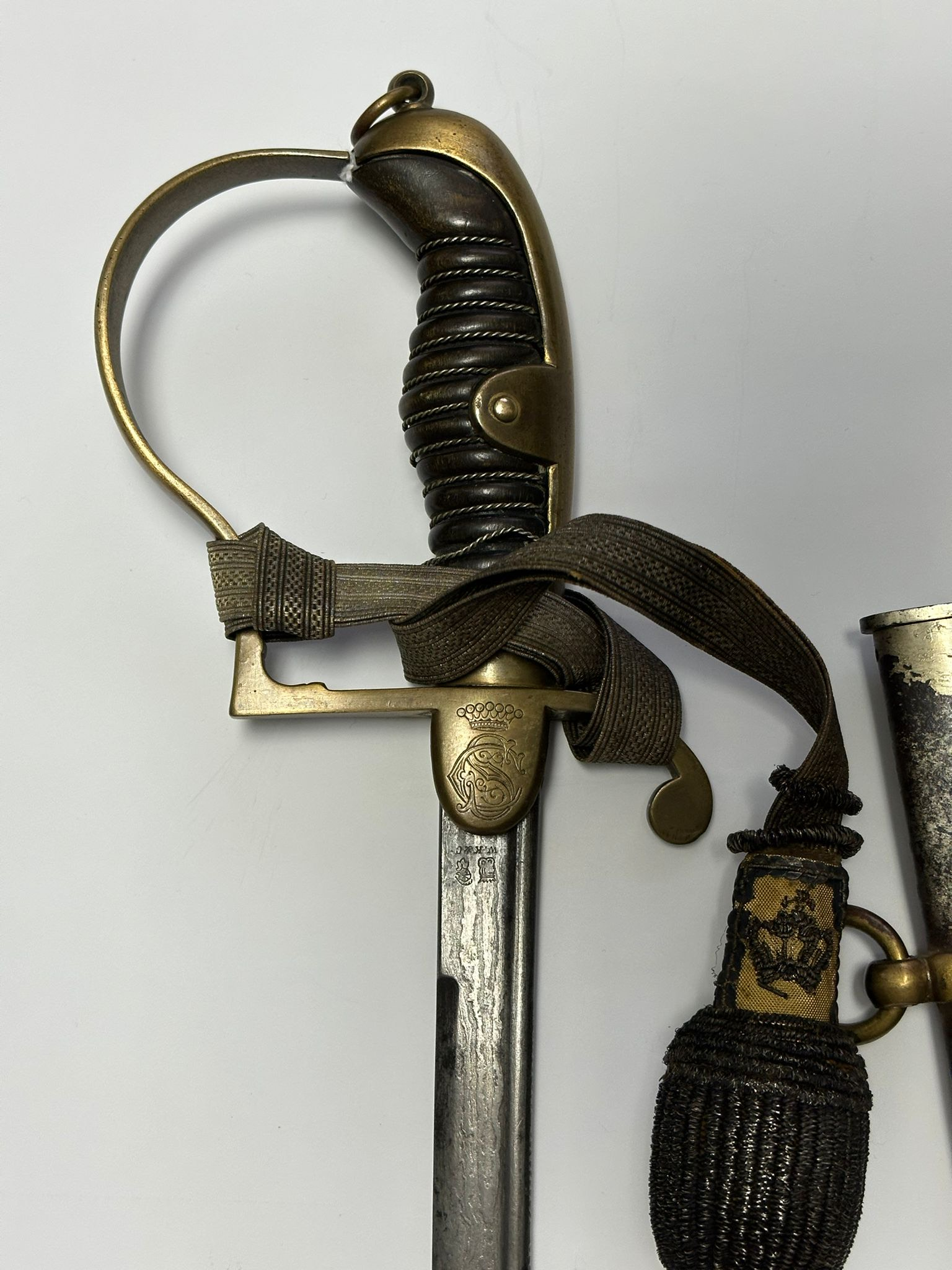
Carl von Schirach's cavalry sword

He worked as assistant director to Max Martersteig at the Cologne Stadttheater on Glockengasse.

He was head of the Weimar Court Theatre from 1909 to 1919. He was also a chamberlain at the grand ducal court in the Grand Duchy of Saxony, until the abdication of Grand Duke Wilhelm Ernst in the revolution of 1918. As theatre director, Carl selected a conservative repertoire, continuing Weimar's anti-Modernist cultural policy. After he was dismissed in 1919, he won a legal battle with the state of Thuringia to secure his pension. He continued to employ servants and retained a box at the theatre.

Schirach was a member of the Weimar Art Society, a board member of the German Shakespeare Society, and a board member of the antisemitic and anti-modern nationalist Militant League for German Culture, of which he was a founding signatory in May 1928. His son Baldur also later joined the League. On 6 December 1926 he joined the Nazi Party, with membership number 48505. He later held a Golden Party Badge.

Schirach became director of the Nassauisches Landestheater in Wiesbaden, until a relatively old age. In 1934 he received a salary of 17,000 Reichsmark (equivalent to €80,000 in 2021). On his 65th birthday in 1938, he was commemorated by the Joseph Goebbels' Reich Ministry for Public Enlightenment and Propaganda. In 1938 he was given the status of "prominent artist", allowing him to pay 40 per cent less tax. Goebbels tried to pension him off in 1940, but he resisted and in 1941 received a pay-rise to 25,000 Reichsmarks (equivalent to €107,000 in 2021). He retired on 31 August 1943 after serving for 10 years.

On 16 July 1944, Emma burned to death when a plane crashed into their house in Wiesbaden and she attempted to rescue her dog. Carl moved to his old villa in Weimar. In 1945 he was taken with his daughter by US troops to the former Buchenwald concentration camp and forced to be photographed in front of a pile of dead bodies. On 22 April he was moved to an apartment. He died on 11 July 1949 and his ashes were buried in the theatre's graves.

Schirach was an amateur violinist.

== Genealogy ==
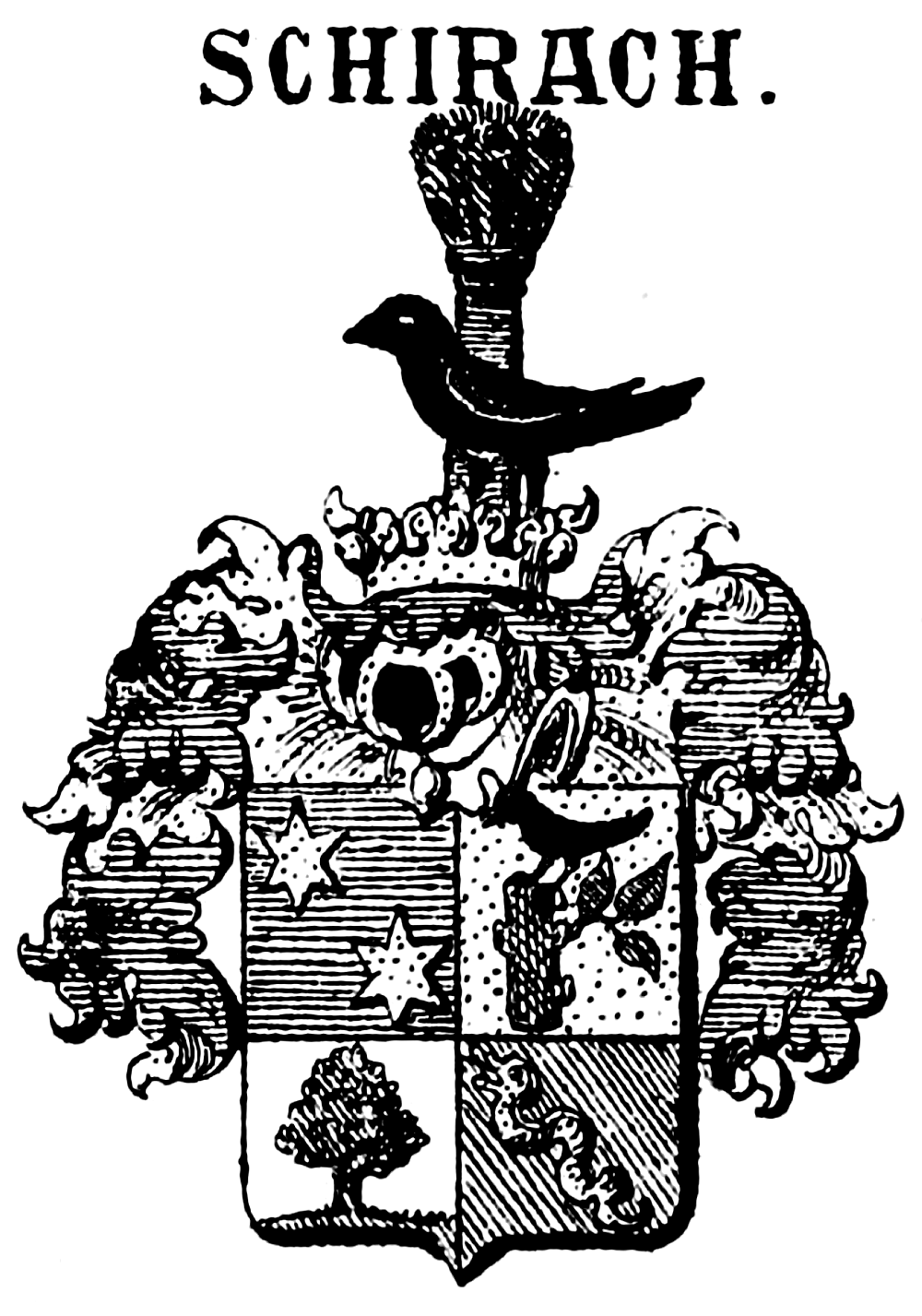
Carl von Schirach's family coat of arms, also known as a "Wappen"

Carl von Schirach was the son of American citizen Karl Friedrich von Schirach (1842–1917), a US Army soldier who fought in the American Civil War on the Union side. As a first lieutenant he lost his leg at the Second Battle of Bull Run. He was an honour guard at President Abraham Lincoln's funeral in 1865, and returned to active service with an artificial leg made of cork. He was promoted to captain in 1867, and retired in 1870. He received the title of Major Retired in 1904. Friedrich Karl's father Karl Benedikt von Schirach (1790–1864) had emigrated to the United States in 1855.

In 1869 Friedrich Karl married Elisabeth Baily Norris (1833–1873) (also spelled Elizabeth), a member of a prominent Philadelphia family. Her father was Richard Norris of Norris Locomotive Works. They moved to Germany in February 1871. They had several children including Carl von Schirach and composer Friedrich Wilhelm von Schirach.

In 1896 Carl von Schirach married Emma Middleton Lynah Tillou (1872–16 July 1944), an American who also belonged to a prominent Philadelphia family. Her great-great-grandfather was Henry Middleton, who served as president of the First Continental Congress. Her great-grandmother was Henry's daughter Susannah Middleton, who married John Parker, a state senator for South Carolina who served as delegate to the Congress of the Confederation from 1786 to 1788.

Carl and Emma had four children: opera singer Rosalind von Schirach; Karl Benedikt; Viktoria Benedikta (1902–1902 or possibly 1899–1901, died of dyptheria), and Nazi youth leader Baldur von Schirach.
