= Johann Alois Seethaler =

German goldsmith

Johann Alois Seethaler (1775–1835) was a German goldsmith.

== Life ==
Seethaler was born in Augsburg, the son of the silversmith Joseph Anton Seethaler. His master's mark, corresponding to his baptismal name Johann Nepomuk, bears the monogram INS. He is referred to in art history as the last important master of the Augsburg goldsmith guild. He obtained the right of master craftsman in 1796 and in 1803/04 he established a trade in silver, officially run for a long time by his father. He distinguished himself by very good contacts with the Munich royal court. In 1807 the company produced a dinner service for the court. From then on, the focus of his work was on table services in early classicist forms. His great business proximity to the Bavarian royal family brought him into conflict with other Bavarian silversmiths. Seethaler's dealership activities are also worth mentioning: he sold the so-called 'Paris silver', which Napoleon had originally had made for his brother Jerôme by J. B. C. Odiot, to the Munich court (Seethaler purchased it directly from Jerôme for 134,100 florins). Johann Alois Seethaler died in Augsburg in 1835. After his death, his son Joseph Anton Seethaler II (1799-1868) took over the company. Due to the changing political situation, major orders failed to materialize, which deprived the company of its outstanding importance. Sons of the family eventually emigrated to Frankfurt/Main at the end of the 19th century, where the company maintained business and family contacts for decades, especially with the Rothschild banking house.

== Works ==
- Tea and coffee service (1814) in the Hermitage of St. Petersburg.
- Dinner service (1817) for the Stuttgart court, Stuttgart State Museum.
- Goblet with classicist deco, Hisorisches Museum der Pfalz, Speyer
- Elephant as part of a dinner service (1810), private collection
