= Joseph Anton Seethaler =

Joseph Anton Seethaler' (1740 in Dießen – 1811 in Augsburg) was a German goldsmith and silver dealer.

== Life and work ==
Seethaler was born in Dießen and presumably apprenticed to a regional master metalworker. After a few years of wandering, he arrived in Augsburg. With the attainment of the Meisterrecht there in 1766, his economic circumstances allowed to marry. 1779–1786 he was the foreman of the goldsmith guild, from 1788 Geschaumeister of the guild; at the same time he became first princely-, since 1808 royal Bavarian court silverworker. As a trademark he used his initials JAS in a cross-oval shield. His company maintained international contacts, especially to Frankfurt and London. Joseph Anton Seethaler's son was Johann Alois Seethaler (1775–1835), who continued the workshop, as did his grandson Joseph Anton Seethaler II. Among the works handed down by father and son are liturgical devices, especially in Neresheim Monastery, secular tableware e. g. in the Munich Residence and Jewish cult objects. Among the master's most spectacular works is the Relic of Saint Pancras in Wil SG. Numerous copperplate engravings of designs for tableware by Joseph Anton have also survived.
