= Rosalind von Schirach =

German opera singer (1898–1981)

Rosalind von Schirach (21 April 1898 – 13 December 1981) was a German opera singer, mainly known as a lyric soprano.

From 1920 to 1925 she performed under the pseudonym Rosa Lind at the Leipzig Opera. From 1925 to 1928 she performed as Rosa Lind as a coloratura soprano at the National Theatre Mannheim. She later performed as a lyric soprano under her real name Rosalind von Schirach from 1930 to 1935 at the Deutsche Oper Berlin. She moved to the Berlin State Opera in 1935. She performed at the Royal Opera House in London in 1935.

She was portrayed as the "ideal image of a Nordic-Aryan singer" in the early Third Reich. She joined the Nazi Party in 1932. At the Deutsche Oper she organised a Nazi employees' cell, assisted by her lover baritone Gerhard Hüsch.

She was the daughter of the theatre director Carl von Schirach, a member of the noble Sorbian Schirach family, and his American wife Emma Middleton Lynah Tillou. She had two brothers including Nazi youth leader Baldur von Schirach.

She married Viktor Borsini Edler von Hohenstern. She was a Christian, but may have left the Church.
