= Takis Würger =

German investigative journalist, author, and war correspondent

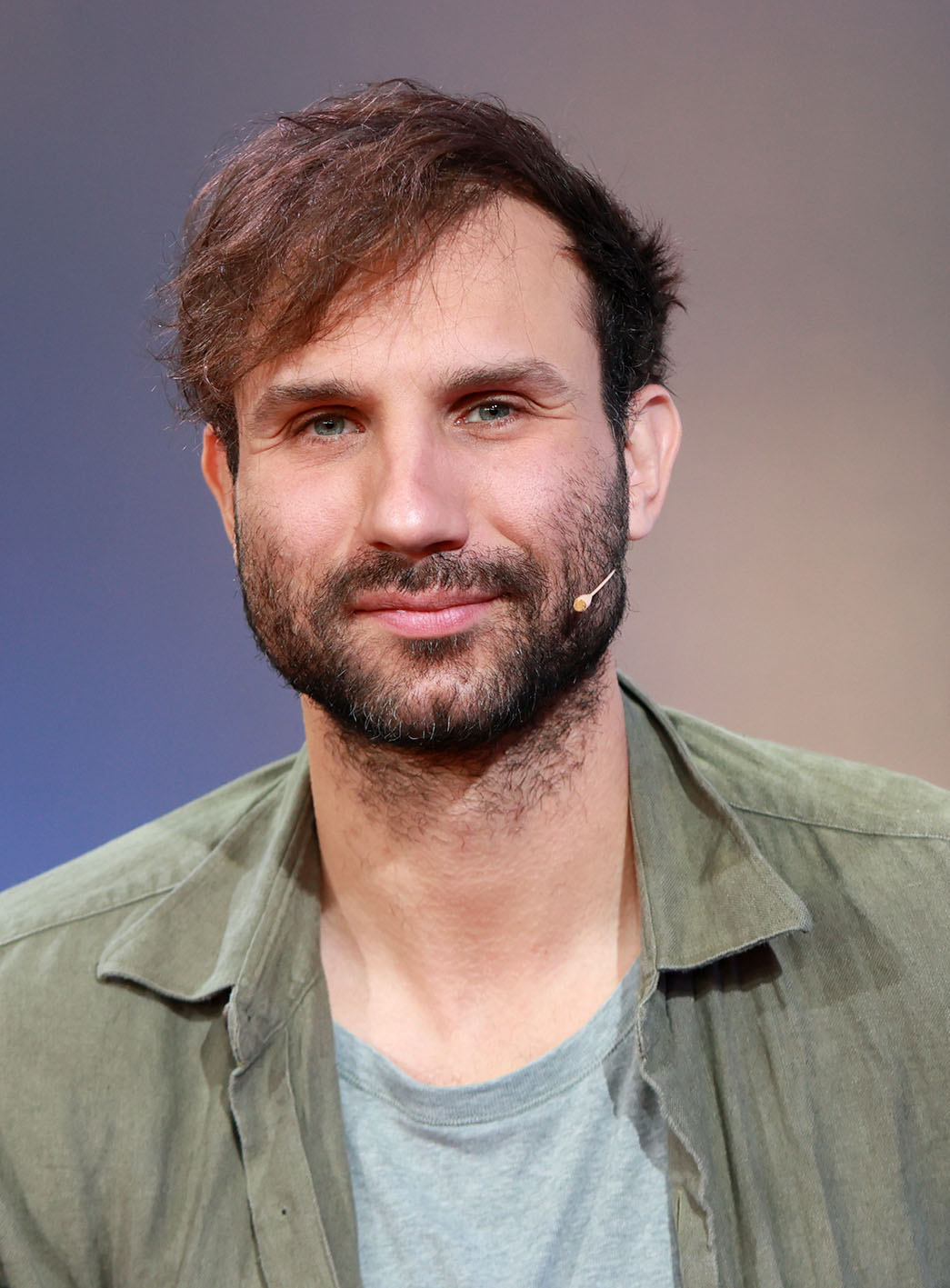
Takis Würger

Takis Würger (born 1985) is a German investigative journalist, author, war correspondent and staff writer for the news magazine Der Spiegel, reporting from warzone locales such as Afghanistan, Libya, Ukraine, and throughout the Middle East.

He was one of the few reporters spending time as an embedded journalist with German military snipers in Afghanistan. He also accompanied German radical Muslims to a Madrasa in Alexandria, Cairo. After sleeping in the apartment of the renowned Salafist preacher Sven Lau and spending a couple of days with him, Würger had to flee the country for security reasons.

Würger, who attended the Henri Nannen School for Journalism in Hamburg, received the German Reporter Award and in 2013 the CNN Journalist Award Germany / Austria / Switzerland for a story about German soldiers in Afghanistan. In 2014 he received the Hansel-Mieth-Preis for a story about an old boxer. In 2010 Würger was nominated by Medium Magazin as one of the „Top 30 Journalists under 30".

Würger published his first novel in 2017. It was a bestseller and won prizes in German-speaking countries. The Club begins with the childhood memories of one of the several first-person narrators in Germany, but is set primarily years later in the UK. His second novel, Stella, is set in the second world war, in Germany, and deals with a Jewish woman who collaborates with the Gestapo. It was hotly debated by critics and provoked legal questions regarding the rights of the heirs of the real person the story was based on.

Würger's third novel is based on the real-life story of the French-born Holocaust survivor and Israeli journalist Noah Klieger. His fourth novel is a crime story centered around a wealthy family on the East Coast of the United States.

== Novels ==
- Der Club (2017). The Club, translated by Charlotte Collins (Grove Press, 2019). ISBN 978-0-8021-2896-6.
- Stella (2019). Stella, translated by Liesl Schillinger (Grove Press, 2021). ISBN 978-0-8021-4917-6.
- Noah. Von einem, der überlebte (2021).
- Unschuld (2022)
- Für Polina (2025)
