= Arthur Middleton (1681–1737) =

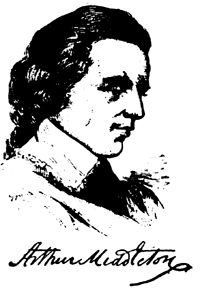

22nd Governor of South Carolina
- In office May 7, 1725 – December 1730
- Monarchs: George I George II
- Preceded by: Francis Nicholson
- Succeeded by: Robert Johnson

Personal details
- Born: October 29, 1681 South Carolina
- Died: September 17, 1737 (aged 55) South Carolina
- Resting place: Saint James Goose Creek Cemetery, Goose Creek, South Carolina
- Spouse: Mary Williams Middleton Sarah Middleton
- Children: Henry, Hester, Thomas, William
- Profession: planter, governor

Arthur Middleton (October 29, 1681 – September 17, 1737) was a South Carolina planter and Acting Governor of the Province of South Carolina from May 7, 1725, to December 1730.

== Biography ==
In 1678, Middleton's father (Edward) and his uncle, Arthur, moved from Barbados to South Carolina, and settled on 1,780 acres of land 14 miles north of Charles Town. His father, Edward had purchased his uncle's share of the landgrant, plus another 3,130 acres, then settled with his wife, Sara, on the plantation; and named the plantation The Oaks.

Middleton was born on October 29, 1681. He married Mary Williams and Sarah Middleton.

== Career ==
Middleton's father died in 1685, leaving to his wife, Sara, and their young son, Arthur, the plantation. In the following decade, English colonists learned how to cultivate rice in fresh water swamps, exploiting the knowledge and labor of enslaved Africans. The Oaks plantation had begun to make money. By 1720, the estate consisted of over 5,000 acres and Middleton owned over 100 slaves.

A well-established member of the Carolina gentry, Middleton became an influential figure. In 1710, he traveled to London to discuss the political problems in the Carolinas.

== Death ==
Middleton died on September 17, 1737, at the age of 56, and at that time he owned 107 slaves. Though he had eight children, only three survived. His widow, Sarah Middleton died on September 24, 1765.

Preceded by Francis Nicholson	Governor of South Carolina (acting); May 7, 1725, to December, 1730	Succeeded by Robert Johnson
