= Norris von Schirach =

German writer (born 1963)

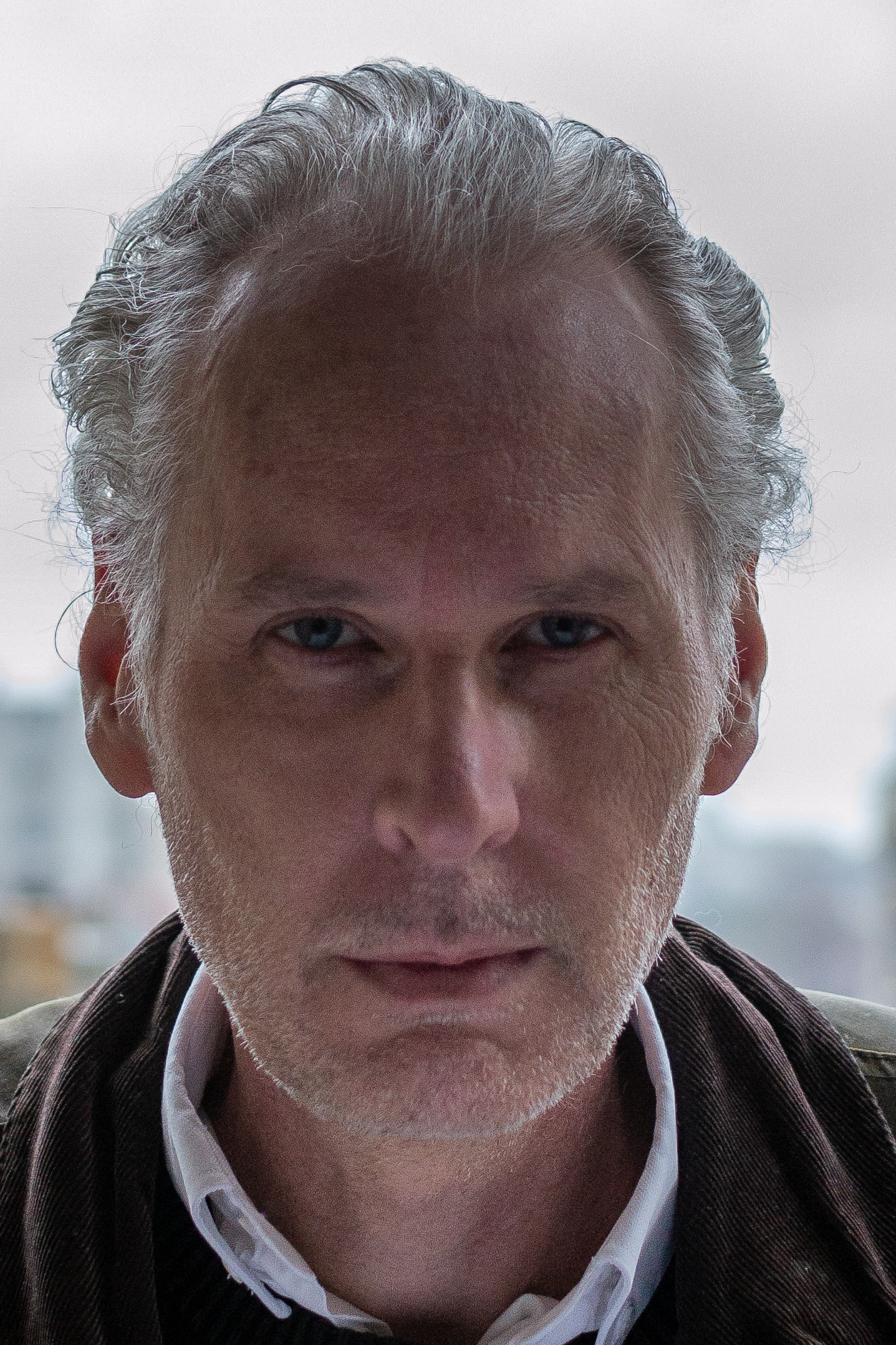
- Schirach in 2021
- Born: 1963 (age 62–63); Munich
- Education: University of Konstanz
- Occupations: Businessman and writer

Norris Benedikt von Schirach (born 1963) pseudonym Arthur Isarin, is a German businessman and writer, who worked for several years as a commodities expert and copper specialist in Russia and elsewhere.

== Background ==
Norris Benedikt von Schirach was born in Munich in 1963. After training in Munich, he initially worked for insurance companies in London and New York before studying administrative sciences at the University of Konstanz and then working in Russia, Kazakhstan and Australia.

Norris von Schirach published his first novel Pale Heroes (Blasse Helden) in spring 2018 with Knaus Verlag (Germany) under the pseudonym Arthur Isarin, however, his authorship was revealed only six months after publication. In his literary work he processed his experiences of the Yeltsin-years in Moscow, which were characterized by "privatization and the accompanying strengthening of the oligarchs as well as the slipping of large parts of the population below the poverty line" and which made Vladimir Putin's system possible in the first place. Viktor Yerofeyev judged Pale Heroes: "Anyone who wants to understand Russia today should read Norris von Schirach - a bold literary adventure." Pale Heroes is the first volume of a planned trilogy and was on the SWR-best list for June for 2018.

In 2022, the novel Looting Time (Beutezeit), published by Penguin (Germany), followed. The novel is about a commodities trader who is tasked with building a steel company in post-Soviet Kazakhstan after "President Nazarbayev [...] transferred the bankruptcy assets of the Soviets into a kind of personal feudal system". While Nicole Köster mentioned Looting Time "reads in part like James Bond on Dostoyevsky", Sigrid Löffler wrote that "it is above all this subtle criticism of the West that makes Norris von Schirach's Looting Time worth reading."

== Personal life ==
His younger brother is lawyer and author Ferdinand von Schirach; his grandfather Baldur von Schirach was Reich Youth Leader of the NSDAP during the National Socialist era.

Today Norris von Schirach lives in seclusion in the Romanian Carpathians. He has one son.

== Quote ==
Family is always destiny, and you have to accept such a destiny; there is, of course, a lifelong confrontation with this person (meaning his grandfather Baldur von Schirach).

— Norris von Schirach,

== Works ==
- Pale Heroes (Blasse Helden), München: Albrecht Knaus Verlag, 2018-03-12, p. 320 ISBN 978-3328109389
- Looting Time (Beutezeit). Roman. Penguin, München 2022, ISBN 978-3-328-60125-8.
