= Henry Middleton (governor) =

American planter and Governor of South Carolina (1770–1846)

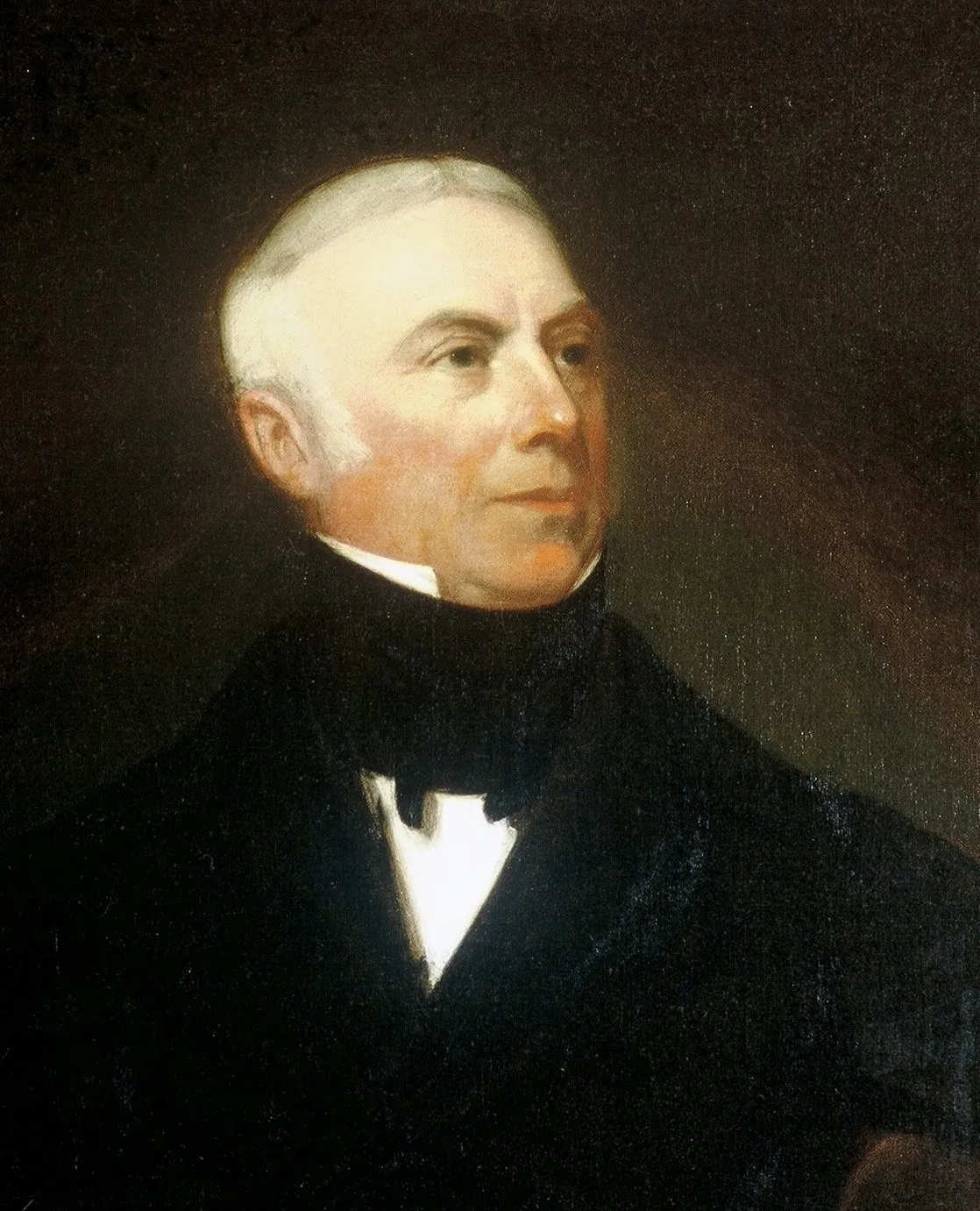
- Portrait by Henry Inman

5th United States Minister to Russia
- In office June 17, 1821 – August 3, 1830
- President: James Monroe; John Quincy Adams; Andrew Jackson
- Preceded by: George Washington Campbell
- Succeeded by: John Randolph (did not present credentials)

Member of the U.S. House of Representatives from South Carolina's 1st district
- In office March 4, 1815 – March 3, 1819
- Preceded by: Langdon Cheves
- Succeeded by: Charles Pinckney

43rd Governor of South Carolina
- In office December 8, 1810 – December 10, 1812
- Lieutenant: Samuel Farrow
- Preceded by: John Drayton
- Succeeded by: Joseph Alston

Member of the South Carolina State Senate from St. Phillip's and St. Michael's Parish
- In office November 26, 1810 – December 8, 1810; Alongside James Kennedy
- Preceded by: John Blake
- Succeeded by: John Johnson

Member of the South Carolina House of Representatives from St. Phillip's and St. Michael's Parish
- In office November 22, 1802 – November 26, 1810

Personal details
- Born: September 28, 1770 London, England
- Died: June 14, 1846 (aged 75) Charleston, South Carolina, U.S.
- Party: Democratic-Republican (until 1830)
- Other political affiliations: Union Party of South Carolina (1830–onward)
- Profession: planter, politician

Henry Middleton (September 28, 1770 – June 14, 1846) was an American planter and political leader from Charleston, South Carolina. He was the 43rd governor of South Carolina (1810–1812), and represented South Carolina in the U. S. Congress (1815–1819).

== Life ==
Middleton served as Minister to Russia (1820–1830), being sent there in the first instance to replace George Washington Campbell, so as to look after interests in the discussions preparatory to arbitration by Czar Alexander I on the question of compensation under Article 1 of the Treaty of Ghent as regards enslaved Americans who went away with the British during and after the War of 1812.

His summer home at Greenville from 1813 to 1820, known as Whitehall, was added to the National Register of Historic Places in 1969. He and his family also spent some of their summer in Newport, RI staying at Stone Villa (demolished in 1957).

== Family ==
His father (Arthur Middleton) and his grandfather (Henry Middleton) had both served in the Continental Congress. Williams Middleton was his son. He had 14 children with wife Mary Helen Hering, daughter of Julines Hering, a planter on Jamaica: ten of their children lived into adulthood, including his youngest son Edward Middleton.

Political offices
Preceded by John Drayton	Governor of South Carolina; 1810–1812	Succeeded by Joseph Alston
U.S. House of Representatives
Preceded by Langdon Cheves	Member of the U.S. House of Representatives from South Carolina's 1st congressional district 1815–1819	Succeeded by Charles Pinckney
Diplomatic posts
Preceded by George Washington Campbell	U.S. Minister to Russia; 1821–1830	Succeeded by John Randolph (did not present credentials)
