= Robert Seethaler =

Austrian novelist, and actor (born 1966)

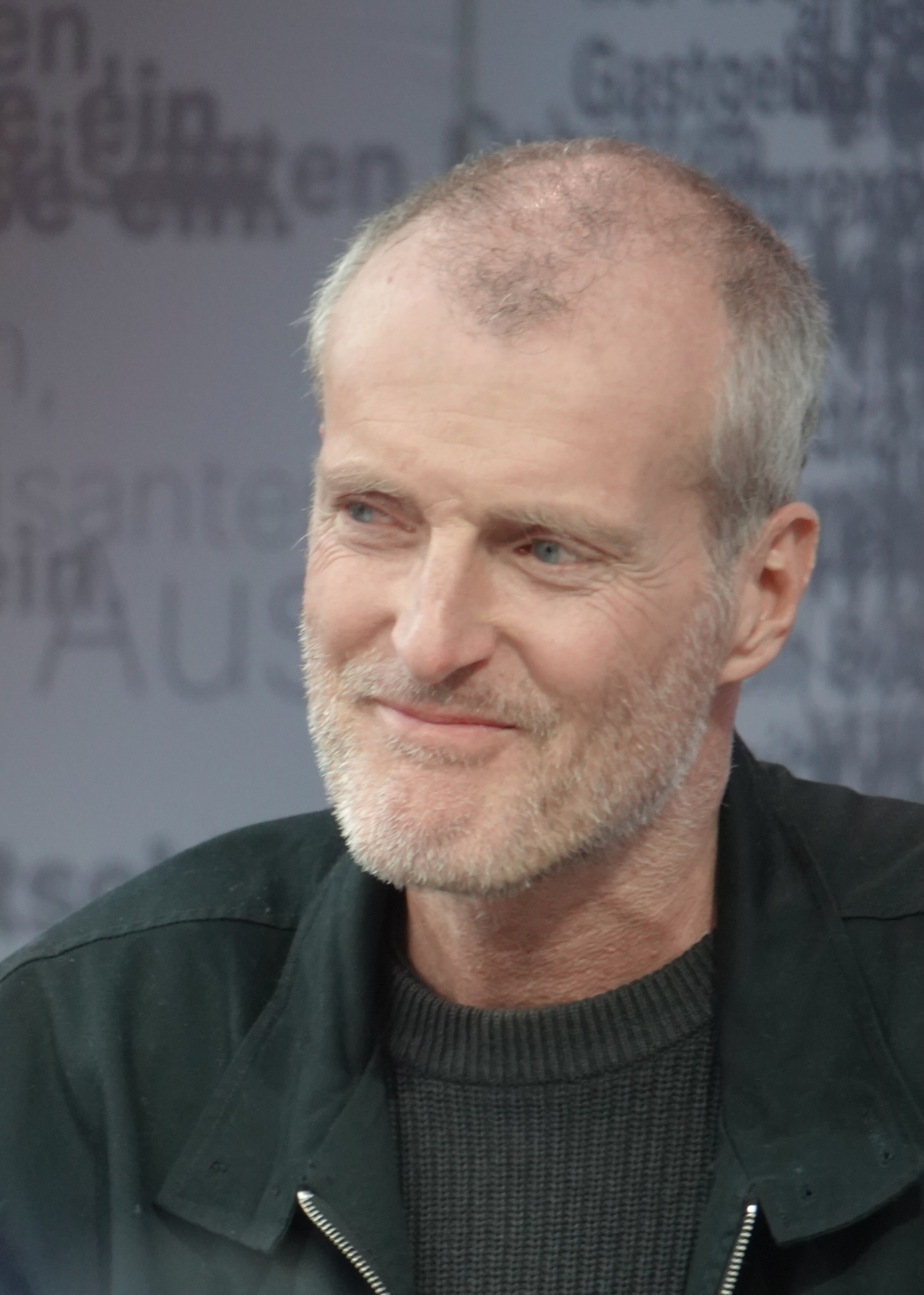
Robert Seethaler

Robert Seethaler (born 7 August 1966 in Vienna, Austria) is an Austrian novelist, and actor.

== Awards and honours ==
- 2005: Tankred-Dorst-Drehbuchpreis of the Drehbuchwerkstatt München for Heartbreakin'
- 2007: Debütpreis des Buddenbrookhauses for Die Biene und der Kurt
- 2008: Alfred-Döblin-Stipendium / Academy of Arts, Berlin
- 2008: Kulturpreis des Landes Niederösterreich
- 2008: My Mother, My Bride and I (German: Die zweite Frau) at the Toronto International Film Festival
- 2009: Spreewald Literature Grant
- 2009: Grimme-Preis for Die zweite Frau (Best Film)
- 2009: Nominated for the European Media Prize for Integration
- 2011: State grant by the Austrian federal government
- 2011: Grant of the Heinrich Heine House of the city of Lüneburg
- 2015: Grimmelshausen Prize for Ein ganzes Leben
- 2016: Shortlisted for the Man Booker International Prize for A Whole Life
- 2016: Buchpreis der Wiener Wirtschaft (book prize of the Austrian Economic Chamber)
- 2017: Anton Wildgans Prize
- 2017: Shortlisted for Dublin Literary Award for A Whole Life
- 2018: Rheingau Literatur Preis for Das Feld

== Novels translated into English ==
- A Whole Life. Translated by Collins, Charlotte. London: Pan Macmillan. 2015. ISBN 978-1-4472-8390-4. OCLC 931536311. – shortlisted for the 2017 Man Booker International Prize, and the 2017 Dublin Literary Award
- The Tobacconist. Translated by Collins, Charlotte. London: Pan Macmillan. 2016. ISBN 978-1-5098-0658-4. OCLC 960964327.
- The Field. Translated by Collins, Charlotte. London, UK: Picador. 2021. ISBN 978-1-5290-0806-7. OCLC 1241252068.
- The Cafe with No Name. Translated by Derbyshire, Katy. New York: Europa Editions. 2025. ISBN 979-8-88966-064-4. OCLC 1439564840.
- The Last Movement. Translated by Collins, Charlotte. New York: Europa Editions. 2026. ISBN 979-8-88966-180-1.

== See also ==
- List of Austrian writers
