= Gottlob Benedikt von Schirach =

Sorbian historian and diplomat

Gottlob Benedikt von Schirach (13 June 1743 – 7 December 1804) (né Gottlob Benedikt Schirach; also spelled Gottlob Benedict Schirach; Sorbian Bohuchwał Benedikt ze Šěrach) was a Sorbian historian, philosopher and writer, and later a diplomat in Danish service.

He was a son of the Sorbian theologian Christian Gottlob Schirach (Křesćan Bohuchwał Šěrach). After studying history and philology at the University of Leipzig, he became a lecturer at the University of Halle in 1764. In 1769 he became Professor of Philosophy at the University of Helmstedt. He published several books and was regarded as a well-known author in his lifetime.

In recognition of his biography of Charles VI, Holy Roman Emperor, he was raised to the hereditary Austrian nobility by Empress Maria Theresa on 17 May 1776. He is the progenitor of the noble Schirach family. In 1780 he became a diplomat in Danish service, and moved to Altona near Hamburg. In Altona he founded the journal Politisches Journal nebst Anzeige von gelehrten und anderen Sachen, one of the most influential journals on political affairs of its time.

== Publications ==
- 1768 – Clavis Poetarum Classicorum. Pars Postrior. Sive Index Philologico-Criticus in Ovidium et Virgilium, Minori Forma in Orphanotropheo Halensi
- 1770 – Ioannis Tzetzae Carmina Iliaca nunc primum e codice august edidit
- 1770–1775 – Ephemerides literariae Helmstadienses (several vols.)
- 1771–1774 – Biographien der Deutschen (several vols.)
- 1772 – Über die moralische Schönheit und Philosophie des Lebens
- 1772–1776 – Magazin der deutschen Kritik (several vols.)
- 1776 – Biographie Kaisers Carls des Sechsten
- 1777 – Biographien des Plutarchs mit Anmerkungen (translation)
- 1777 – Historisch-statistische Notiz der Großbrittannischen Colonien in America, mit politischen Anmerkungen, die gegenwertigen Americanischen Unruhen betreffend
- 1776 – Das dänische Indigenatrecht
