= Benedict Wells =

German-Swiss novelist (born 1984)

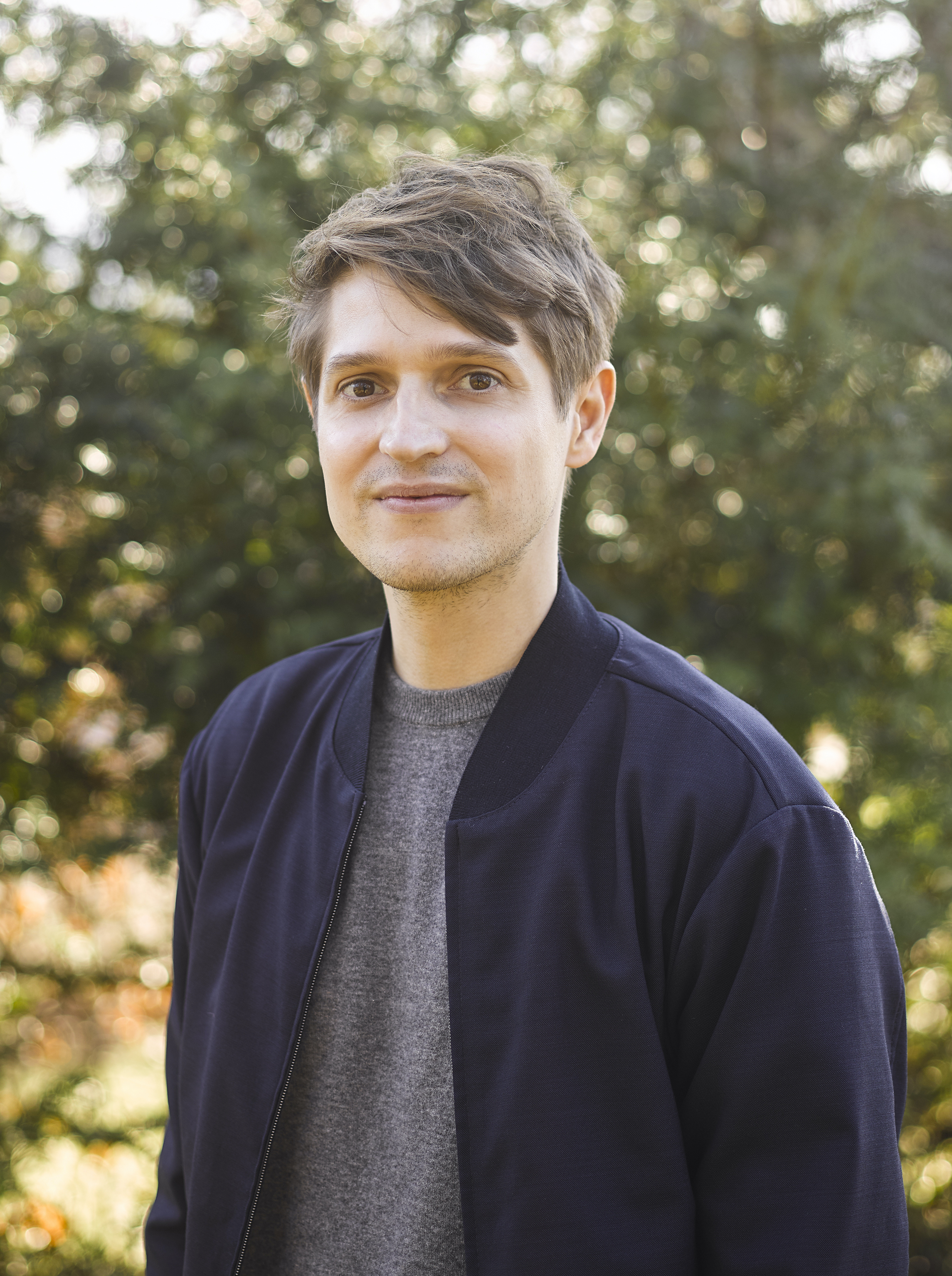
- Wells in 2021
- Born: Benedict von Schirach; 29 February 1984 (age 42); Munich, West Germany
- Occupation: Writer
- Website: www.benedictwells.de

Benedict Wells (born Benedict von Schirach, 29 February 1984) is a German-Swiss novelist.

== Life and career ==
Wells grew up in Bavaria. At the age of six, he was sent to a state boarding school after his parents separated and had to deal with several problems. All of his school years were spent at boarding schools and homes. Following his graduation from high school in 2003, he decided not to go to university but instead moved to Berlin to pursue his writing. He made a living doing odd jobs, while his manuscripts were rejected by publishers and agencies for years.

His first novel Becks letzter Sommer (Beck's Last Summer) was published in 2008 and received widespread acclaim. It was described by Die Zeit as "the most interesting debut of the year" and was made into a film in 2015, starring Christian Ulmen. In the meantime, his third novel Fast genial (Almost Ingenious) had become a first bigger success in Germany.

Wells released his fourth novel Vom Ende der Einsamkeit (The End of Loneliness), a family drama, in February 2016. He had worked seven years on it. It remained on the German bestseller list for more than 80 weeks and awarded the 2016 European Union Prize for Literature. An English translation by Charlotte Collins was published in 2018. As of 2023, it is the only book by Wells to be translated into English.

His fifth novel Hard Land was published in February 2021 and became an instant number 1 bestseller in Germany. It takes place in 1985 in a fictional small town in Missouri. The novel won the Deutscher Jugendliteraturpreis and is also described as an hommage to classic American 80s movies like The Breakfast Club and Stand by Me (film).

Wells' books have been translated into 38 languages and have sold more than one million copies worldwide. He previously did not allow his books to be published as ebooks. Since 2018 his books are initially available as hardcover books and audiobooks, then only later as ebooks when the paperback edition is published. This system is intended to support bookshops.

== Family ==
He was born Benedict von Schirach and is a member of the Sorbian Schirach noble family. He is the brother of the philosopher and writer Ariadne von Schirach, a cousin of the author Ferdinand von Schirach, the son of the sinologist Richard von Schirach and a grandson of the Nazi youth leader and war criminal Baldur von Schirach. Wells legally changed his surname at the age of 19, because he wanted to distance himself from what his German grandfather had done and this part of his family's history, which he condemns. His family background did not become publicly known until after the success of his third novel. The name Wells was inspired by the character Homer Wells in John Irving's novel The Cider House Rules.

Wells holds both German and Swiss citizenship. His mother was Swiss.

== Awards and honors ==
- 2008: Bayerischer Kunstförderpreis for Becks letzter Sommer
- 2016: European Union Prize for Literature for Vom Ende der Einsamkeit
- 2016: Book prize of the "Stiftung Ravensburger Verlag" for Vom Ende der Einsamkeit
- 2016: Favourite book of the independent book shops for Vom Ende der Einsamkeit
- 2018: Euregio Literature Prize for Vom Ende der Einsamkeit
- 2021: Favourite book of the Swiss-German book shops for Hard Land
- 2022: Deutscher Jugendliteraturpreis for Hard Land

== Books ==
- Becks letzter Sommer. Diogenes, Zürich 2008, ISBN 978-3-257-06676-0.
- Spinner. Diogenes, Zürich 2009, ISBN 978-3-257-06717-0.
- Fast genial. Diogenes, Zürich 2011, ISBN 978-3-257-06789-7.
- Vom Ende der Einsamkeit. Diogenes Verlag, Zürich 2016, ISBN 978-3-257-06958-7.
- Die Wahrheit über das Lügen: Zehn Geschichten. Diogenes Verlag, Zürich 2018, ISBN 978-3-257-07030-9.
- Hard Land. Roman. Diogenes, Zürich 2021, ISBN 978-3-257-07148-1.
