= Henry Middleton =

American politician ( (1717–1784)

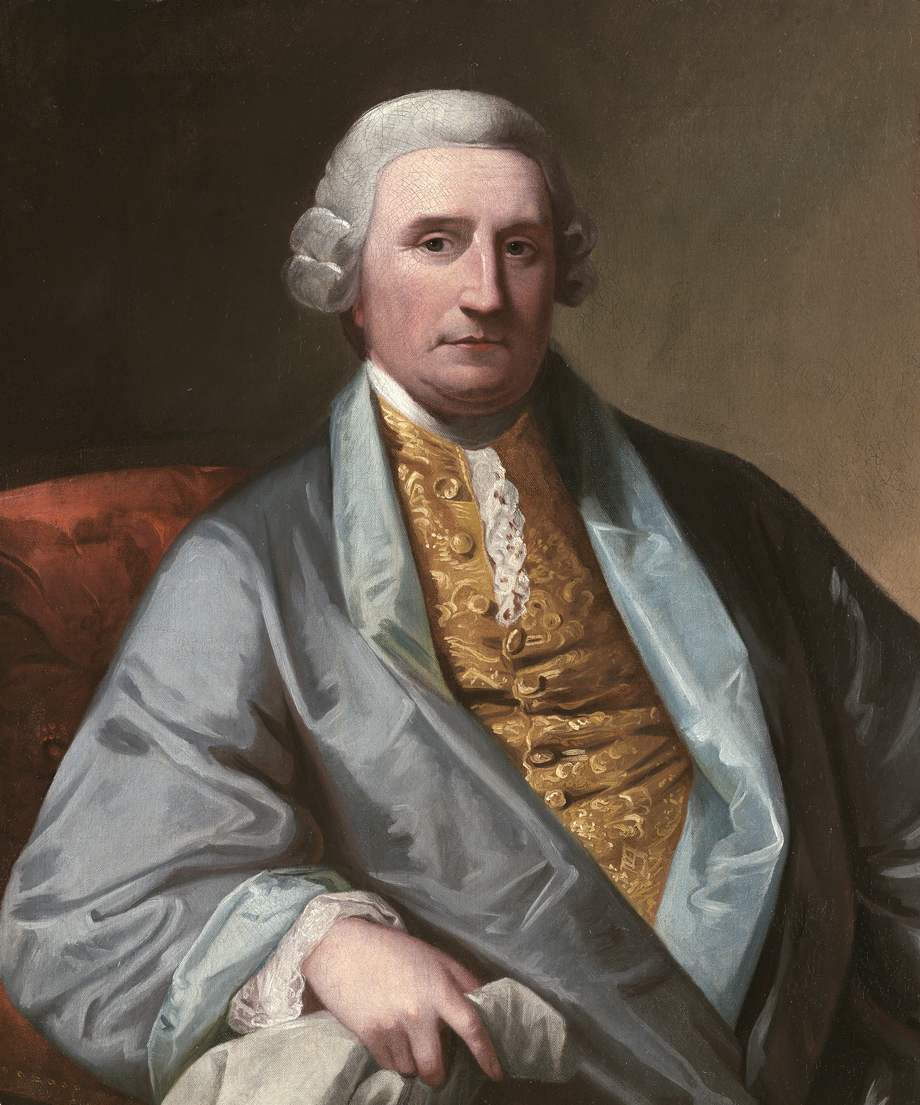
- Possible portrait by Benjamin West, c. 1771

2nd President of the Continental Congress
- In office October 22, 1774 – October 26, 1774
- Preceded by: Peyton Randolph
- Succeeded by: Peyton Randolph

Personal details
- Born: 1717 near Charles Town, Province of South Carolina
- Died: June 13, 1784 (aged 66–67) Charleston, South Carolina, U.S.
- Spouses: Mary Baker Williams (m. 1741; died 1761) Mary Henrietta Bull (m. 1762; died 1772) Lady Mary McKenzie (m. 1776)
- Relations: Henry Middleton (grandson)
- Children: 12, including Arthur
- Parent(s): Susan Amory Middleton; Arthur Middleton
- Occupation: Planter, public official

Henry Middleton (1717 – June 13, 1784) was an American politician and planter from South Carolina. A member of the colonial legislature, during the American Revolution he attended the First Continental Congress and served as that body's president for four days in 1774 after the passage of the Continental Association, which he signed. He left the Second Continental Congress before it declared independence. Back in South Carolina, he served as president of the provincial congress and senator in the newly created state government. After his capture by the British in 1780, he accepted defeat and returned to the status of a British subject until the end of the war.

== Early life ==
Henry Middleton was born in 1717 on the family plantation, "The Oaks", near Charleston, Province of South Carolina. He was the second son of Susan (née Amory) Middleton (1690-1722) and Arthur Middleton (1681–1737), a wealthy planter who had served as an acting governor of South Carolina. His grandfather, Edward Middleton, emigrated from England via Barbados. He was educated in England before returning to South Carolina to inherit his father's plantation. He became one of the largest landowners in the colony, owning 50,000 acres (200 km^{2}) and about 800 slaves.

== Public career ==
Middleton served in a variety of public offices in South Carolina. He was a justice of the peace and a member of the Commons House of Assembly, where he was elected speaker in 1747, 1754, and 1755. He was a member of provincial council but resigned in 1770 in opposition to British policy.

In 1774, at the outset of the American Revolution, Middleton was selected as a delegate to the Continental Congress. He served as that body's president during the last few days of the First Continental Congress, following the departure of Peyton Randolph. Middleton opposed declaring independence from Great Britain and resigned from the Second Continental Congress in February 1776 when more radical delegates began pushing for independence. He was succeeded in Congress by his son Arthur who was more radical than his father and became a signer of the Declaration of Independence.

After Middleton's return to South Carolina, he was elected president of the provincial congress and, beginning on November 16, 1775, served on the council of safety. In 1776, he and his son Arthur helped frame a temporary state constitution. In 1779, he became a state senator in the new government.

When Charleston was captured by the British at the Siege of Charleston in 1780, Middleton accepted defeat and status as a British subject. This reversal apparently did not damage his reputation in the long run, because of his previous support of the Revolution, and he did not suffer the fate of having his estates confiscated, as many Loyalists did after the war.

== Personal life ==
In 1741, Middleton was married to Mary Baker Williams (1721–1761), the daughter of John Williams, an early South Carolina planter who began building what is today known as Middleton Place around 1730. Together, Henry and Mary were the parents of five sons and seven daughters, seven of whom survived to adulthood, including:

- Arthur Middleton (1742–1787), a signer of the Declaration of Independence who married Mary Izard (1747–1814).
- Henrietta Middleton (1750–1792), who married Governor Edward Rutledge.
- Thomas Middleton (1753–1797), who married Anne Manigault.
- Hester Middleton (1754–1789), who married Charles Drayton.
- Sarah Middleton (1756–1784), who married Charles Cotesworth Pinckney.
- Mary Middleton (1757-1825), who married Peter Smith.
- Susannah Middleton (1760–1834), who married Continental Congressman John Parker.

After his wife's death in 1761, Middleton would go on to marry twice more. His second marriage was to Maria Henrietta Bull (1722–1772), daughter of William Bull Sr., the lieutenant governor of South Carolina, in 1762. His second wife's sister, Charlotta (née Bull) Drayton, was the mother of Continental Congressman William Henry Drayton, and her brother, William Bull II, served as governor of South Carolina before leaving the colony in 1782 when British troops were evacuated at the end of the War.

After his second wife's death in 1772, he married for the third time, although it was her fourth marriage, to Lady Mary McKenzie, the daughter of George Mackenzie, 3rd Earl of Cromartie, in 1776. Among Lady Mary's brothers were John Mackenzie, Lord MacLeod and George Mackenzie. Her father was a Scottish nobleman who followed Charles Edward Stuart, the Jacobite Pretender. The Earl of Cromartie was tried and sentenced to death, but he obtained a conditional pardon although his peerage was forfeited.

Middleton died on June 13, 1784, in Charleston. He was buried at Goosecreek Churchyard, St. James Parish, Berkeley County, South Carolina.

=== Descendants ===
His grandson, also named Henry (1770–1846), had a long career in politics. He was governor of South Carolina (1810–1812), U.S. Representative (1815–1819), and the minister to Russia (1820–1830). Henry had fourteen children, including Williams Middleton and Edward Middleton.

Political offices
Preceded by Peyton Randolph	President of the First Continental Congress; October 22, 1774 – October 26, 1774	Succeeded by Peyton Randolph (as President of the Second Continental Congress)
