= Arthur Middleton =

Signer of the U.S. Declaration of Independence (1742–1787)

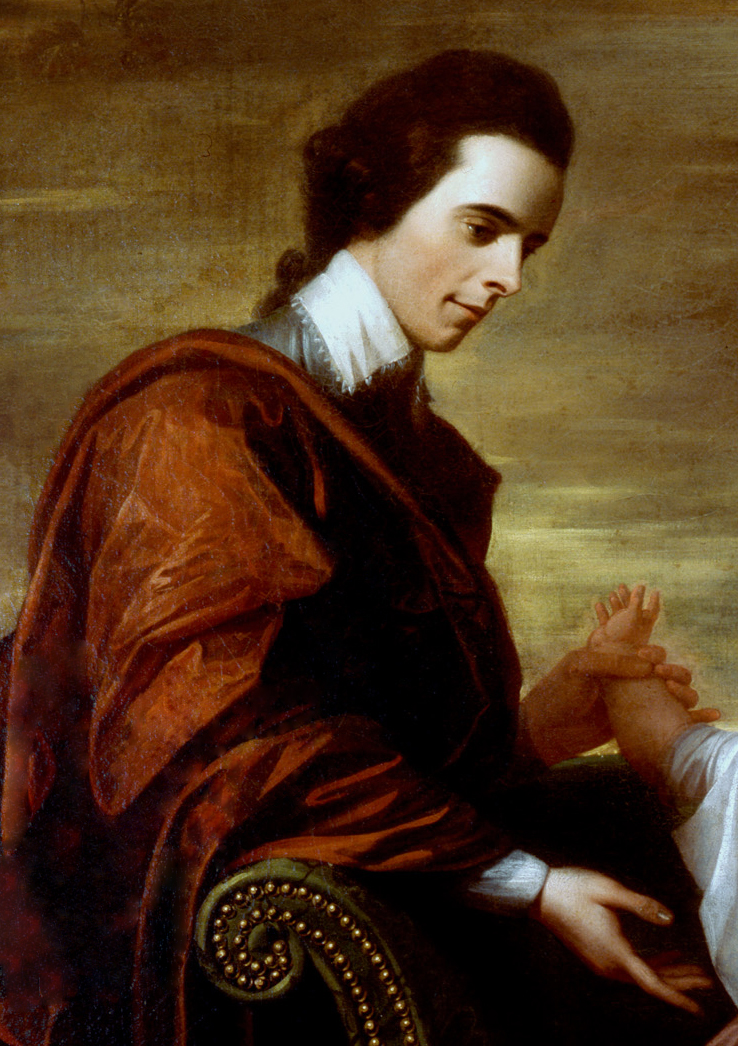
- Portrait by Benjamin West, 1771
- Born: June 26, 1742; Charleston, Province of South Carolina, British America
- Died: January 1, 1787 (aged 44) "The Oaks" near Charleston, South Carolina, U.S.
- Resting place: Middleton Place Gardens and Tomb, Charleston Grandchildren: Nathan Middleton Jackson, Maura Cameron Jackson
- Education: Trinity Hall, Cambridge
- Known for: signer of the United States Declaration of Independence

Signature
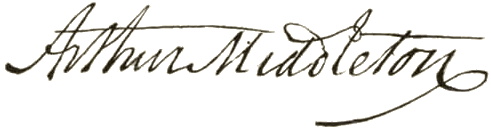

Arthur Middleton (June 26, 1742 – January 1, 1787) was a Founding Father of the United States, signer of the United States Declaration of Independence, and a representative from South Carolina in the Second Continental Congress.

== Life ==
Middleton was born in Charleston, Province of South Carolina, in 1742. His parents were Henry Middleton and Mary Baker Williams, both of English descent. He was educated in Britain at Harrow School, Westminster School, and Trinity Hall, Cambridge. He studied law at the Middle Temple and traveled extensively in Europe where his taste in literature, music, and art was developed and refined. In 1764, Arthur and his bride Mary Izard settled at Middleton Place.

Keenly interested in Carolina, Middleton was a more radical thinker than his father. He was a leader of the American Party in Carolina and one of the boldest members of the Council of Safety and its Secret Committee. In 1776, Middleton was elected to succeed his father in the Continental Congress and subsequently was a signer of the United States Declaration of Independence. Also in 1776, he and William Henry Drayton designed the Great Seal of South Carolina. His attitude toward Loyalists was said to be ruthless, this stood in contrast to other South Carolina patriots such as Francis Marion who led the effort to reconcile with the loyalists after the war ended.

During the American Revolutionary War, Middleton served in the defense of Charleston. After the city's fall to the British in 1780, he was sent as a prisoner of war to St. Augustine, Florida (along with Edward Rutledge and Thomas Heyward Jr.), until exchanged in July the following year.

== Death, family and legacy ==
Coat of Arms of Arthur Middleton

Middleton died on January 1, 1787, at age 44 and was buried in the family tomb in the Gardens at Middleton Place. The death notice from the State Gazette of South-Carolina describes him as a "tender husband and parent, humane master, steady unshaken patriot, the gentleman, and the scholar." The plantation passed to Henry, his eldest son, later governor of South Carolina, U.S. Representative and minister to Russia.

Middleton was an ancestor of actor Charles B. Middleton, who played Ming the Merciless in the Flash Gordon movies of the 1930s. Middleton's son-in-law was Congressman Daniel Elliott Huger who was the grandfather-in-law of Confederate General Arthur Middleton Manigault. Middleton's sister, Susannah Middleton, was the great-great-grandmother of Baldur von Schirach, onetime leader of the Hitler Youth and later governor ("Gauleiter" or "Reichsstatthalter") of the Reichsgau Vienna, who was convicted of crimes against humanity at the Nuremberg trials.

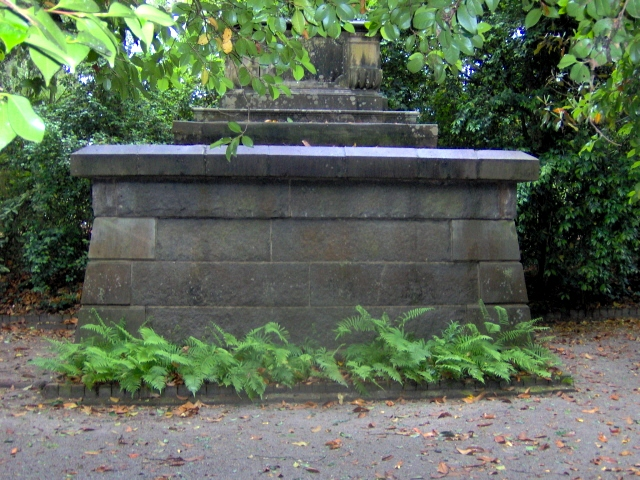
The tomb of Arthur Middleton at Middleton Place

The United States Navy ship USS Arthur Middleton (AP-55/APA-25) was named for him.

== See also ==
- Memorial to the 56 Signers of the Declaration of Independence
